= List of New Testament minuscules (1–1000) =

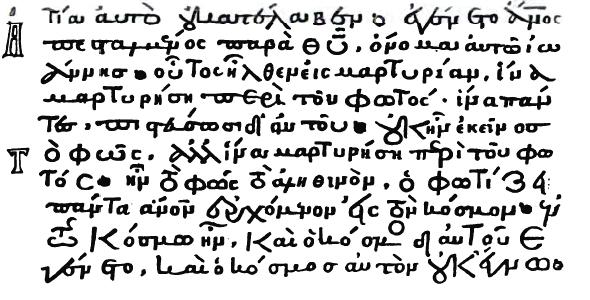
John 1:5b-10 in Codex Ebnerianus (Minuscule 105) from 12th century.

A New Testament minuscule is a copy of a portion of the New Testament written in a small, cursive Greek script (developed from Uncial).

Below is the list of New Testament minuscules 1 to 1000. For other related lists, see:

- Lists of New Testament minuscules
- List of New Testament minuscules (1001–2000)
- List of New Testament minuscules (2001–3000)

== Legend ==
- The numbers (#) are the now standard system of Caspar René Gregory, often referred to as the Gregory–Aland numbers.
- Included among the cataloged minuscules are the following types of manuscripts, color coded:

Grey represents continuous text manuscripts containing only New Testament portions
Beige represents manuscripts with New Testament portions and a catena (quotations from church fathers)
Light cyan represents manuscripts of single-author commentaries who included the full Scripture text.
Light red represents manuscripts of single-author commentaries who included both the full Scripture text and a catena.
Light purple represents manuscripts of commentaries where the Scripture text was abridged.
White represents manuscript numbers no longer in use.

- Dates are estimated to the nearest 100 year increment where the specific date is unknown.
- Content generally only describes sections of the New Testament: Gospels, The Acts of the Apostles (Acts), Pauline epistles, and so on. Sometimes the surviving portion of a codex is so limited that specific books, chapters or even verses can be indicated. Linked articles, where they exist, generally specify content in detail, by verse.
- Digital images are referenced with direct links to the hosting web pages, with the exception of those at the INTF. The quality and accessibility of the images is as follows:

Gold color indicates high resolution color images available online.
Tan color indicates high resolution color images available locally, not online.
Light tan color indicates only a small fraction of manuscript pages with color images available online.
Light gray color indicates black/white or microfilm images available online.
Light blue color indicates manuscript not imaged, and is currently lost or ownership unknown.
Light pink color indicates manuscript destroyed, presumed destroyed, or deemed too fragile to digitize.
Violet color indicates high resolution ultraviolet images available online.

† Indicates the manuscript has damaged or missing pages.
^{P} Indicates only a portion of the books were included.
^{S} Indicates lost portions of manuscript replaced via supplement of a later hand.
^{abs} (Abschrift) Indicates manuscript is a copy. All of these have now received new numbers from the INTF.
[ ] Brackets around the Gregory–Aland number indicate the manuscript belongs to an already numbered manuscript, was formerly numbered as a copy of another manuscript, was found not to be a continuous text manuscript, was found to be written in modern Greek rather than Koine Greek, or has been destroyed.

== Minuscules 1-100 ==
#	Date	Contents	Pages	Institution and refs.	City, State	Country	Images
1	12th	Gospels, Acts, Pauline Epistles, General epistles	297	Basel University Library, A. N. IV. 2	Basel	Switzerland	INTF
1	12th	Gospels, Acts, Pauline Epistles, General epistles	297	Basel University Library, A. N. IV. 2	Basel	Switzerland	CSNTM
2	11th/12th	Gospels	248	Basel University Library, A. N. IV. 1	Basel	Switzerland	INTF
2	11th/12th	Gospels	248	Basel University Library, A. N. IV. 1	Basel	Switzerland	CSNTM
3	12th	Gospels, Acts, Pauline Epistles, General epistles	451	Austrian National Library, Cod. Suppl. gr. 52	Vienna	Austria	INTF, CSNTM
4	13th	Gospels	212	National Library, Grec 84	Paris	France	BnF, INTF, CSNTM
5	14th	Acts, General Epistles, Pauline epistles, Gospels	342	National Library, Grec 106	Paris	France	BnF, INTF
6	13th	Gospels, Acts, Pauline epistles, General Epistles	235	National Library, Grec 112	Paris	France	BnF, CSNTM, INTF
7	12th	Gospels	186	National Library, Grec 71	Paris	France	BnF, CSNTM
8	11th	Gospels	199	National Library, Grec 49	Paris	France	BnF, CSNTM, INTF
9	1167	Gospels	298	National Library, Grec 83	Paris	France	BnF, CSNTM, INTF
[9^{abs}]= 2883							
10	13th	Gospels	275	National Library, Grec 91	Paris	France	BnF, INTF, CSNTM
11	12th	Gospels	504	National Library, Grec 121, 122	Paris	France	BnF, CSNTM
11	12th	Gospels	504	National Library, Grec 121, 122	Paris	France	INTF
12	14th	Gospels	294	National Library, Grec 230	Paris	France	BnF, INTF, CSNTM
13	13th	Gospels	170	National Library, Grec 50	Paris	France	BnF, INTF, CSNTM
14	964	Gospels†	392	National Library, Grec 70	Paris	France	INTF
15	12th	Gospels	225	National Library, Grec 64	Paris	France	BnF, INTF, CSNTM
16	14th	Gospels	361	National Library, Grec 54	Paris	France	INTF
17	15th	Gospels	354	National Library, Grec 55	Paris	France	BnF, INTF, CSNTM
18	1364	New Testament	444	National Library, Grec 47	Paris	France	BnF, INTF, CSNTM
19	12th	Gospels	387	National Library, Grec 189	Paris	France	BnF, INTF, CSNTM
20	11th	Gospels	274	National Library, Grec 188	Paris	France	BnF, INTF, CSNTM
21	12th	Gospels†	203	National Library, Grec 68	Paris	France	BnF, INTF, CSNTM
22	12th	Gospels†	232	National Library, Grec 72	Paris	France	BnF, INTF, CSNTM
23	11th	Gospels†	230	National Library, Grec 77	Paris	France	BnF, INTF
24	10th	Gospels†	240	National Library, Grec 178	Paris	France	BnF, INTF, CSNTM
25	11th	Gospels†	292	National Library, Grec 191	Paris	France	BnF, INTF, CSNTM
26	11th	Gospels	179	National Library, Grec 78	Paris	France	BnF, INTF, CSNTM
27	10th	Gospels†	460	National Library, Grec 115	Paris	France	BnF, CSNTM, INTF
28	11th	Gospels†	292	National Library, Grec 379	Paris	France	BnF, CSNTM, INTF
29	10th	Gospels	169	National Library, Grec 89	Paris	France	BnF, INTF, CSNTM
30	15th	Gospels	313	National Library, Grec 100	Paris	France	INTF
[30^{abs}]= 2884							
31	13th	Gospels†	188	National Library, Grec 94	Paris	France	BnF
32	12th	Gospels†	244	National Library, Grec 116	Paris	France	BnF, INTF, CSNTM
33	9th	Gospels†, Acts†, General Epistles†, Pauline epistles†	143	National Library, Grec 14	Paris	France	BnF, INTF, CSNTM
34	10th	Gospels	469	National Library, Coislin 195	Paris	France	BnF, INTF
35	11th	New Testament	328	National Library, Coislin 199	Paris	France	BnF, INTF
36	10th	Gospels	509	National Library, Coislin 20	Paris	France	BnF
37	11th	Gospels	357	National Library, Coislin 21	Paris	France	INTF, BnF
38	12th	Gospels†, Acts, Pauline Epistles, General Epistles	300	National Library, Coislin 200	Paris	France	BnF, INTF
39	11th	Gospels	288	National Library, Coislin 23	Paris	France	BnF, INTF
40	11th	Gospels†	312	National Library, Coislin 22	Paris	France	INTF, BnF
41	11th	Matthew†, Mark†	224	National Library, Coislin 24	Paris	France	INTF, BnF
42	11th	Acts†, Pauline Epistles†, General Epistles† Revelation†	303	City Archives, Ms 17	Frankfurt (Oder)	Germany	INTF
43	11th	Gospels†, Acts†, Pauline Epistles†, General Epistles†	388	Library of the Arsenal, 8409, 8410	Paris	France	BnF, CSNTM, INTF
44	12th	Gospels	259	British Library, Add MS 4949	London	UK	BL
44	12th	Gospels	259	British Library, Add MS 4949	London	UK	INTF
45	13th	Gospels†	398	Bodleian Library, MS. Barocci 31	Oxford	UK	DB
45	13th	Gospels†	398	Bodleian Library, MS. Barocci 31	Oxford	UK	INTF
46	1300	Gospels	342	Bodleian Library, MS. Barocci 29	Oxford	UK	DB
46	1300	Gospels	342	Bodleian Library, MS. Barocci 29	Oxford	UK	INTF
47	15th	Gospels	554	Bodleian Library, MS. Auct. D. 5. 2	Oxford	UK	CSNTM, INTF
48	12th	Gospels	145	Bodleian Library, MS. Auct. D. 2. 17	Oxford	UK	INTF
49	12th	Gospels	223	Bodleian Library, MS. Roe 1	Oxford	UK	INTF
50	11th	Gospels†	241	Bodleian Library, MS. Laud. Gr. 33	Oxford	UK	INTF
51	13th	Gospels†, Acts, Pauline Epistles, General Epistles†	325	Bodleian Library, MS. Laud. Gr. 31	Oxford	UK	INTF
52	1285-6	Gospels	158	Bodleian Library, MS. Laud. Gr. 3	Oxford	UK	INTF
52	1285-6	Gospels	158	Bodleian Library, MS. Laud. Gr. 3	Oxford	UK	DB
53	13/14th	Gospels	140	Bodleian Library, MS. Selden Supra 28	Oxford	UK	INTF
54	1337-8	Gospels	230	Bodleian Library, MS. Selden Supra 29	Oxford	UK	INTF
55	14th	Gospels	349	Bodleian Library, MS. Selden Supra 6	Oxford	UK	INTF
55	14th	Gospels	349	Bodleian Library, MS. Selden Supra 6	Oxford	UK	DB
56	15th	Gospels	232	Lincoln College, Gr. 18	Oxford	UK	CSNTM, INTF
57	12th	Gospels, Acts, Pauline epistles, General Epistles	291	Magdalen College, Gr. 9	Oxford	UK	DB
57	12th	Gospels, Acts, Pauline epistles, General Epistles	291	Magdalen College, Gr. 9	Oxford	UK	INTF
58	15th	Gospels	342	New College, 68	Oxford	UK	CSNTM, INTF
59	13th	Gospels	238	Gonville and Caius College, Ms 403/412	Cambridge	UK	INTF
60	1297	Gospels	291	Cambridge University Library, Dd. 9.69, fol. 4–294	Cambridge	UK	CSNTM, INTF
61	16th	New Testament	455	Trinity College, MS 30	Dublin	Ireland	TCD, INTF
62	14th	Acts†, Pauline Epistles†, General Epistles†	135	National Library, Gr. 60	Paris	France	BnF, INTF
63	10th	Gospels†	237	Trinity College, MS 31 fol. 1-237	Dublin	Ireland	TCD, INTF
64	12th	Gospels	443	Museum of the Bible, G.C.MS.000474.1-.2	Washington, DC	USA	MOTB
64	12th	Gospels	443	Museum of the Bible, G.C.MS.000474.1-.2	Washington, DC	USA	INTF
65	11th	Gospels	309	British Library, Harley MS 5776	London	UK	BL
65	11th	Gospels	309	British Library, Harley MS 5776	London	UK	INTF
66	14th	Gospels	298	Trinity College, O. VIII 3	Cambridge	UK	INTF
67	10th	Gospels†	202	Bodleian Library, MS. Auct. E. 5. 11	Oxford	UK	INTF
67	10th	Gospels†	202	Bodleian Library, MS. Auct. E. 5. 11	Oxford	UK	BL
68	11th	Gospels	291	Lincoln College, Gr. 17	Oxford	UK	INTF
69	15th	New Testament†	213	Leicestershire Record Office, Cod. 6 D 32/1	Leicester	UK	CSNTM, INTF
70	15th	Gospels	186	Cambridge University Library, L1.2.13	Cambridge	UK	INTF
71	1160	Gospels	265	Lambeth Palace, MS528	London	UK	LP, CSNTM, INTF
72	11th	Gospels	268	British Library, Harley MS 5647	London	UK	BL
72	11th	Gospels	268	British Library, Harley MS 5647	London	UK	INTF
73	12th	Gospels	291	Christ Church, Wake 26	Oxford	UK	INTF
74	1291-2	Gospels†	204	Christ Church, Wake 20	Oxford	UK	INTF
75	11th	Gospels	484	Geneva Library, Gr. 19	Geneva	Switzerland	INTF
76	12th	Gospels, Acts, Pauline Epistles, General Epistles	358	Austrian National Library, Theol. Gr. 300	Vienna	Austria	CSNTM, INTF
77	11th	Gospels	302	Austrian National Library, Theol. Gr. 154	Vienna	Austria	CSNTM, INTF
78	12th	Gospels	296	National Széchényi Library, Cod. Graec. 1	Budapest	Hungary	INTF
79	15th	Gospels	208	Leiden University Library, B. P. Gr. 74	Leiden	Netherlands	INTF
80	12th	Gospels	309	National Library, Smith-Lesouëf 5	Paris	France	INTF
81	1044	Acts†	57	British Library, Add MS 20003	London	UK	BL
81	1044	Pauline Epistles†	225	Greek Orthodox Patriarchate, 59	Alexandria	Egypt	INTF
82	10th	Acts, Pauline Epistles, Revelation	246	National Library, Grec 237	Paris	France	BnF, INTF, CSNTM
83	11th	Gospels	321	Bavarian State Library, Cod.graec. 518	Munich	Germany	BSB
83	11th	Gospels	321	Bavarian State Library, Cod.graec. 518	Munich	Germany	CSNTM, INTF
84	12th	Matthew, Mark	66	Bavarian State Library, Cod.graec. 568	Munich	Germany	BSB, INTF
85	13th	Matthew† 8:15-9:17, 16:12-17:20, 24:26-45, 26:35-54; Mark† 6:13-9:45; Luke† 3:12-6:44; John† 9:7-12:5, 20:23-21:11	30	Bavarian State Library, Cod.graec. 569	Munich	Germany	BSB, INTF
86	11th/12th	Gospels	281	Slovak Academy of Sciences, 394 kt	Bratislava	Slovakia	CSNTM
86	11th/12th	Gospels	281	Slovak Academy of Sciences, 394 kt	Bratislava	Slovakia	INTF
87	11th	John	231	Cusanusstift, Bd. 18	Bernkastel-Kues	Germany	INTF
88	12th	Acts, Pauline Epistles, General Epistles, Revelation 1:1-3:13†	123	Victor Emmanuel III National Library, Ms. II. A. 7	Naples	Italy	CSNTM, INTF
89	1289–90	Gospels	173	Göttingen University Library, Cod. Ms. theol. 28 Cim.	Göttingen	Germany	INTF
90	16th	Gospels, Acts, Pauline Epistles, General Epistles	480	University of Amsterdam, Remonstr. 186	Amsterdam	Netherlands	INTF
91	11th	Acts†, Pauline Epistles†, Revelation†	313	National Library, Grec 219	Paris	France	BnF, INTF
92	10th	Mark	141	Basel University Library O. II. 27	Basel	Switzerland	INTF
93	10th/11th	Acts, Pauline Epistles†, General Epistles, Revelation	270	National Library, Coislin 205	Paris	France	INTF, BnF
94	12th/13th	Acts, Pauline Epistles, General Epistles	302	National Library, Coislin 202 bis (fol. 27-328)	Paris	France	INTF
95	12th	Luke, John	110	Lincoln College, Gr. 16	Oxford	UK	INTF
96	15th	Gospel of John	62	Bodleian Library, MS. Auct. D. 5. 1	Oxford	UK	INTF
[96^{abs}]= 2885							
97	12th	Acts, Pauline Epistles, General Epistles	204	Herzog August Library, Gud. Graec. 104.2	Wolfenbüttel	Germany	INTF
98	11th	Gospels	222	Bodleian Library, MS. E. D. Clarke 5	Oxford	UK	INTF
99	15th/16th	Matthew† 4:8-5:27; 6:2-15:30; Luke 1:1-13†	22	University of Leipzig, Cod. Gr. 8	Leipzig	Germany	INTF
100	10th	Gospels	374	Eötvös Loránd University, Cod. Gr. 1	Budapest	Hungary	INTF

[top]

== Minuscules 101-200 ==
#	Date	Contents	Pages	Institution and refs.	City, State	Country	Images
101	11th	Acts†, Pauline Epistles†, General Epistles†	85	Saxon State and University Library Dresden (SLUB), Mscr. Dresd. A. 104	Dresden	Germany	INTF
102	1444	Acts, Pauline Epistles, General Epistles	111	State Historical Museum, V. 412, S. 5	Moscow	Russia	INTF
103	12th	Theophylact Commentary on Acts, Pauline Epistles, General Epistles	333	State Historical Museum, V. 96, S. 347	Moscow	Russia	INTF
104	1087	Acts, Pauline Epistles, General Epistles, Revelation	286	British Library, Harley MS 5537	London	United Kingdom	BL
104	1087	Acts, Pauline Epistles, General Epistles, Revelation	286	British Library, Harley MS 5537	London	United Kingdom	INTF
105	12th	Gospels, Acts, Pauline Epistles, General Epistles	426	Bodleian Library, MS. Auct. T. inf. 1. 10	Oxford	United Kingdom	INTF
106	10th	Gospels	212	Chester Beatty Library, CBL W 135	Dublin	Ireland	CSNTM
106	10th	Gospels	212	Chester Beatty Library, CBL W 135	Dublin	Ireland	INTF
107	13th	Gospels	351	Bodleian Library, MS. E. D. Clarke 6	Oxford	United Kingdom	INTF
107	13th	Gospels	351	Bodleian Library, MS. E. D. Clarke 6	Oxford	United Kingdom	DB
108	11th	Gospels	426	Victor Emmanuel III National Library, Cod. Neapol. ex Vind. 3	Naples	Italy	INTF
109	1326	Gospels	225	British Library, Add MS 5117	London	United Kingdom	BL
109	1326	Gospels	225	British Library, Add MS 5117	London	United Kingdom	INTF
110	12th	Acts†, Pauline Epistles†, General Epistles†, Revelation†	156	British Library, Harley MS 5778	London	United Kingdom	BL
110	12th	Acts†, Pauline Epistles†, General Epistles†, Revelation†	156	British Library, Harley MS 5778	London	United Kingdom	INTF
111	12th	Gospels†	181	Bodleian Library, MS. E. D. Clarke 7	Oxford	United Kingdom	INTF
112	11th	Gospels	167	Bodleian Library, MS. E. D. Clarke 10	Oxford	United Kingdom	INTF
112	11th	Gospels	167	Bodleian Library, MS. E. D. Clarke 10	Oxford	United Kingdom	DB
113	11th	Gospels	270	British Library, Harley MS 1810	London	United Kingdom	BL
113	11th	Gospels	270	British Library, Harley MS 1810	London	United Kingdom	INTF
114	11th	Gospels†	280	British Library, Harley MS 5540	London	United Kingdom	BL
114	11th	Gospels†	280	British Library, Harley MS 5540	London	United Kingdom	INTF
115	10th	Gospels†	271	British Library, Harley MS 5559	London	United Kingdom	BL
115	10th	Gospels†	271	British Library, Harley MS 5559	London	United Kingdom	INTF
116	12th	Gospels	300	British Library, Harley MS 5567	London	United Kingdom	BL
116	12th	Gospels	300	British Library, Harley MS 5567	London	United Kingdom	INTF
117	15th	Gospels†	182	British Library, Harley MS 5731	London	United Kingdom	BL
117	15th	Gospels†	182	British Library, Harley MS 5731	London	United Kingdom	INTF
118	13th	Gospels†	261	Bodleian Library MS. Auct. D. inf. 2. 17	Oxford	United Kingdom	INTF, CSNTM
119	12th	Gospels	237	National Library, Grec 85	Paris	France	BnF, INTF, CSNTM
120	12th	Matthew, Luke, John	125	National Library, Supplément grec 185, fol. 1-39.68-153	Paris	France	BnF, INTF
121	13th	Gospels†	241	Sainte-Geneviève Library, 3398	Paris	France	INTF
122	12th	Gospels, Acts†, Pauline Epistles†, General Epistles^{P}†	222	Leiden University Library, B. P. Gr. 74^{a}	Leiden	Netherlands	INTF
123	1000	Gospels	326	Austrian National Library, Theol. Gr. 240	Vienna	Austria	CSNTM, INTF
124	12th	Gospels	188	Austrian National Library, Theol. Gr. 188	Vienna	Austria	INTF, CSNTM
125	11th	Gospels	301	Austrian National Library, Suppl. gr. 50, fol. 5-305	Vienna	Austria	CSNTM, INTF
126	12th	Gospels	219	Herzog August Library, Codd. Aug. 16. 6. 4	Wolfenbüttel	Germany	INTF
127	11th	Gospels	378	Vatican Library, Vat.gr.349	Vatican City	Vatican City	DVL
128	13th	Gospels	377	Vatican Library, Vat.gr.356	Vatican City	Vatican City	DVL, INTF
129	12th	Gospels	355	Vatican Library, Vat.gr.358	Vatican City	Vatican City	DVL
129	12th	Gospels	355	Vatican Library, Vat.gr.358	Vatican City	Vatican City	INTF
130	15th	Gospels†	229	Vatican Library, Vat.gr.359	Vatican City	Vatican City	INTF
131	14th	Gospels, Acts, Pauline Epistles, General Epistles	233	Vatican Library, Vat.gr.360	Vatican City	Vatican City	INTF, CSNTM
132	12th	Gospels	292	Vatican Library, Vat.gr.361	Vatican City	Vatican City	INTF
133	11th	Gospels, Acts, Pauline Epistles, General Epistles	332	Vatican Library, Vat.gr.363	Vatican City	Vatican City	DVL, INTF
134	12th	Gospels	297	Vatican Library, Vat.gr.364	Vatican City	Vatican City	DVL
134	12th	Gospels	297	Vatican Library, Vat.gr.364	Vatican City	Vatican City	INTF
135	10th	Gospels†	181	Vatican Library, Vat.gr.365	Vatican City	Vatican City	INTF
136	13th	Zigabenus Commentary on Matthew†, Mark†	235	Vatican Library, Vat.gr.665	Vatican City	Vatican City	INTF
137	11th	Gospels	300	Vatican Library, Vat.gr.756	Vatican City	Vatican City	DVL
137	11th	Gospels	300	Vatican Library, Vat.gr.756	Vatican City	Vatican City	INTF
138	11th	Gospels†	380	Vatican Library, Vat.gr.757	Vatican City	Vatican City	DVL, INTF
139	1173	Luke, John	233	Vatican Library, Vat.gr.758	Vatican City	Vatican City	DVL
139	1173	Luke, John	233	Vatican Library, Vat.gr.758	Vatican City	Vatican City	INTF
140	13th	Gospels†	408	Vatican Library, Vat.gr.1158	Vatican City	Vatican City	DVL
140	13th	Gospels†	408	Vatican Library, Vat.gr.1158	Vatican City	Vatican City	INTF
141	13th	New Testament	400	Vatican Library, Vat.gr.1160	Vatican City	Vatican City	INTF
142	11th	Gospels, Acts, Pauline Epistles, General Epistles	324	Vatican Library, Vat.gr.1210	Vatican City	Vatican City	INTF
143	11th	Gospels	275	Vatican Library, Vat.gr.1229	Vatican City	Vatican City	DVL
143	11th	Gospels	275	Vatican Library, Vat.gr.1229	Vatican City	Vatican City	INTF
144	10th	Gospels†	268	Vatican Library, Vat.gr.1254	Vatican City	Vatican City	INTF
145	11th	Luke†, John†	161	Vatican Library, Vat.gr.1548	Vatican City	Vatican City	INTF
146	12th	Matthew, Mark	265	Vatican Library, Pal.gr.5	Vatican City	Vatican City	HU
146	12th	Matthew, Mark	265	Vatican Library, Pal.gr.5	Vatican City	Vatican City	INTF
147	13th	Gospels	355	Vatican Library, Pal.gr.89	Vatican City	Vatican City	HU
147	13th	Gospels	355	Vatican Library, Pal.gr.89	Vatican City	Vatican City	INTF
148	11th	Gospels	153	Vatican Library, Pal.gr.136	Vatican City	Vatican City	HUL
149	15th	New Testament	179	Vatican Library, Pal.gr.171	Vatican City	Vatican City	DVL, INTF
150	11th	Gospels	331	Vatican Library, Pal.gr.189	Vatican City	Vatican City	DVL
150	11th	Gospels	331	Vatican Library, Pal.gr.189	Vatican City	Vatican City	INTF
151	10th	Gospels	224	Vatican Library, Pal.gr.220	Vatican City	Vatican City	DVL
151	10th	Gospels	224	Vatican Library, Pal.gr.220	Vatican City	Vatican City	INTF
152	13th	Gospels	315	Vatican Library, Pal.gr.227	Vatican City	Vatican City	INTF
153	14th	Gospels	268	Vatican Library, Pal.gr.229	Vatican City	Vatican City	HU
154	13th	Theophylact Commentary on the Gospels	355	Vatican Library, Reg.gr.28	Vatican City	Vatican City	INTF
155	13th	Gospels	307	Vatican Library, Reg.gr.79	Vatican City	Vatican City	DVL, INTF
156	12th	Gospels	244	Vatican Library, Reg.gr.189	Vatican City	Vatican City	INTF
157	1122	Gospels	325	Vatican Library, Urb.gr.2	Vatican City	Vatican City	DVL
157	1122	Gospels	325	Vatican Library, Urb.gr.2	Vatican City	Vatican City	CSNTM, INTF
158	11th	Gospels	236	Vatican Library, Reg.gr.Pii.II.55	Vatican City	Vatican City	INTF
159	1121	Gospels†	203	Vatican Library, Barb.gr.482	Vatican City	Vatican City	DVL, INTF
160	1123	Gospels	216	Vatican Library, Barb.gr.445	Vatican City	Vatican City	INTF
161	10th	Gospels†	203	Vatican Library, Barb.gr.352	Vatican City	Vatican City	INTF
162	1153	Gospels	248	Vatican Library, Barb.gr.449	Vatican City	Vatican City	DVL
162	1153	Gospels	248	Vatican Library, Barb.gr.449	Vatican City	Vatican City	INTF
163	1193	Gospels	173	Vatican Library, Barb.gr.520	Vatican City	Vatican City	INTF
164	1039	Gospels	214	Vatican Library, Barb. gr. 319	Vatican City	Vatican City	INTF
165	1292	Gospels	214	Vatican Library, Barb.gr.541	Vatican City	Vatican City	DVL, INTF
166	11th/12th	Luke†, John†	75	Vatican Library, Barb.gr.412	Vatican City	Vatican City	INTF
167	13th	Gospels	264	Vatican Library, Barb.gr.287	Vatican City	Vatican City	INTF
168	13th	Theophylact Commentary on the Gospels†	217	Vatican Library, Barb.gr.570	Vatican City	Vatican City	DVL, INTF
169	11th	Gospels	252	Vallicelliana Library, ms.B. 133	Rome	Italy	IC
169	11th	Gospels	252	Vallicelliana Library, ms.B. 133	Rome	Italy	INTF
170	13th	Gospels†	277	Vallicelliana Library, ms.C. 61	Rome	Italy	INTF
171	14th	Gospels	254	Vallicelliana Library, ms.C 73 II	Rome	Italy	IC
171	14th	Gospels	254	Vallicelliana Library, ms.C 73 II	Rome	Italy	INTF
172	13th/14th	Acts†, Pauline Epistles†, General Epistles†, Rev.†	234	Berlin State Library, Phill. 1461	Berlin	Germany	INTF
173	12th	Gospels†	155	Vatican Library, Vat.gr.1983	Vatican City	Vatican City	DVL, INTF
174	1052	Gospels†	132	Vatican Library, Vat.gr.2002	Vatican City	Vatican City	INTF
175	10th/11th	New Testament†	247	Vatican Library, Vat.gr.2080	Vatican City	Vatican City	INTF
176	13th	Gospels†	77	Vatican Library, Vat.gr.2113	Vatican City	Vatican City	INTF
177	11th	Acts, Pauline Epistles, General Epistles, Revelation	225	Bavarian State Library, Cod.graec. 211	Munich	Germany	BSB
177	11th	Acts, Pauline Epistles, General Epistles, Revelation	225	Bavarian State Library, Cod.graec. 211	Munich	Germany	INTF
178	12th	Gospels	272	Angelica Library, Ang. gr. 123	Rome	Italy	IC
178	12th	Gospels	272	Angelica Library, Ang. gr. 123	Rome	Italy	CSNTM, INTF
179	12th	Gospels†	249	Angelica Library, Ang. gr. 11	Rome	Italy	IC
179	12th	Gospels†	249	Angelica Library, Ang. gr. 11	Rome	Italy	INTF
180	12th/13th	Gospels	238	Vatican Library, Borg.gr.18 (fol. 1-238)	Vatican City	Vatican City	INTF
181	10th	Acts, Pauline Epistles†, General Epistles	155	Vatican Library, Reg.gr.179 (fol. 1-155)	Vatican City	Vatican City	INTF
182	14th	Gospels	226	Laurentian Library, Plut.06.11	Florence	Italy	BML, INTF
183	12th	Gospels	349	Laurentian Library, Plut.06.14	Florence	Italy	BML, INTF
184	13th	Gospels	72	Laurentian Library, Plut.06.15	Florence	Italy	BML, INTF
185	14th	Gospels	341	Laurentian Library, Plut.06.16	Florence	Italy	BML, INTF
186	11th	Gospels	268	Laurentian Library, Plut.06.18	Florence	Italy	BML, INTF
187	12th	Gospels	212	Laurentian Library, Plut.06.23	Florence	Italy	BML, INTF
188	12th	Gospels	228	Laurentian Library, Plut.06.25	Florence	Italy	BML, INTF
189	14th	Gospels†, Acts, Pauline Epistles, General Epistles	452	Laurentian Library, Plut.06.27	Florence	Italy	BML, INTF
190	14th	Gospels	439	Laurentian Library, Plut.06.28	Florence	Italy	BML, INTF
191	12th	Gospels	180	Laurentian Library, Plut.06.29	Florence	Italy	BML, INTF
192	13th	Gospels	200	Laurentian Library, Plut.06.30	Florence	Italy	BML, INTF
193	12th	Gospels	165	Laurentian Library, Plut.06.32	Florence	Italy	BML, INTF
194	11th	Gospels†	258	Laurentian Library, Plut.06.33	Florence	Italy	BML, INTF
195	11th	Gospels	277	Laurentian Library, Plut.06.34	Florence	Italy	BML, INTF
196	12th	Zigabenus Commentary on the Gospels†	369	Laurentian Library, Plut.08.12	Florence	Italy	BML, INTF
197	11th	Matthew†, Mark, James†	154	Laurentian Library, Plut.08.14	Florence	Italy	BML, INTF
198	13th	Gospels	171	Laurentian Library, Edili 221	Florence	Italy	BML, CSNTM, INTF
199	12th	Gospels	214	Laurentian Library, Conv. Sopp. 160	Florence	Italy	CSNTM, INTF
200	11th	Gospels	229	Laurentian Library, Conv. Sopp. 159	Florence	Italy	BML, CSNTM, INTF

[top]

== Minuscules 201-300 ==
#	Date	Contents	Pages	Institution and refs.	City, State	Country	Images
201	1357	New Testament	493	British Library, Add MS 11837	London	UK	BL
201	1357	New Testament	493	British Library, Add MS 11837	London	UK	INTF
202	12th	Gospels	278	British Library, Add MS 14774	London	UK	BL
202	12th	Gospels	278	British Library, Add MS 14774	London	UK	INTF
203	1111	Acts, Pauline Epistles, General Epistles, Revelation (no commentary)	149	British Library, Add MS 28816	London	UK	BL
203	1111	Acts, Pauline Epistles, General Epistles, Revelation (no commentary)	149	British Library, Add MS 28816	London	UK	INTF
204	13th/14th	Gospels, Acts, Pauline Epistles, General Epistles	443	University of Bologna, 2775	Bologna	Italy	INTF
205	15th	New Testament	80	Marciana National Library, Gr. Z 5 (420)	Venice	Italy	INTF, CSNTM
[205^{abs}]= 2886							
206	13th	Acts†, Pauline Epistles, General Epistles†	397	Lambeth Palace, MS1182	London	UK	CSNTM
207	11th	Gospels†	267	Marciana National Library, Gr. Z 8 (378)	Venice	Italy	INTF
208	11th	Gospels	239	Marciana National Library, Gr. Z 9 (664)	Venice	Italy	INTF
209	14th	Gospels, Acts, Pauline Epistles, General Epistles	381	Marciana National Library, Gr. Z. 10 (394), fol. 1-381	Venice	Italy	INTF, CSNTM
210	11th	Gospels†	372	Marciana National Library, Gr. Z 27 (341)	Venice	Italy	INTF
211	12th	Gospels†	280	Marciana National Library, Gr. Z 539 (303)	Venice	Italy	INTF
212	11th	Gospels†	273	Marciana National Library, Gr. Z 540 (557)	Venice	Italy	INTF
213	11th	Gospels†	356	Marciana National Library, Gr. Z 542 (409)	Venice	Italy	INTF
214	14th	Gospels	227	Marciana National Library, Gr. Z 543 (409)	Venice	Italy	INTF
215	11th	Gospels	272	Marciana National Library, Gr. Z 544 (591)	Venice	Italy	INTF
216	1358	Acts, Pauline Epistles†, General Epistles	236	Lambeth Palace, MS1183	London	UK	CSNTM
217	12th	Gospels	299	Marciana National Library, Gr. I, 3 (944)	Venice	Italy	INTF
218	13th	New Testament†	138	Austrian National Library, Theol. gr. 23, NT: fol. 486-623	Vienna	Austria	INTF, CSNTM
219	13th	Gospels	232	Austrian National Library, Theol. gr. 321	Vienna	Austria	INTF, CSNTM
220	13th	Gospels	303	Austrian National Library, Theol. gr. 337	Vienna	Austria	CSNTM, INTF
221	10th	Acts, Pauline Epistles, General Epistles	382	Bodleian Library, Canon. Gr. 110	Oxford	UK	INTF
221	10th	Acts, Pauline Epistles, General Epistles	382	Bodleian Library, Canon. Gr. 110	Oxford	UK	DB
222	14th	Gospels†	346	Austrian National Library, Theol. gr. 180	Vienna	Austria	INTF, CSNTM
223	14th	Acts†, Pauline Epistles†, General Epistles†	376	University of Michigan Library, Ms. 34	Ann Arbor	USA	CSNTM, INTF
224	12th	Matthew	97	Victor Emmanuel III National Library, Vind. 10	Naples	Italy	INTF
225	1192	Gospels	171	Victor Emmanuel III National Library, Vind. 9	Naples	Italy	INTF
226	12th	Gospels, Acts, Pauline Epistles, General Epistles	377	Royal Site of San Lorenzo de El Escorial, X, IV, 17	San Lorenzo de El Escorial	Spain	INTF
227	13th	Gospels	158	Royal Site of San Lorenzo de El Escorial, X, III, 15	San Lorenzo de El Escorial	Spain	INTF
228	14th	Gospels, Acts, Romans - Titus	126	Royal Site of San Lorenzo de El Escorial, X, IV, 12	San Lorenzo de El Escorial	Spain	INTF
229	1140	Gospels†	297	Royal Site of San Lorenzo de El Escorial, X, IV, 21	San Lorenzo de El Escorial	Spain	CSNTM, INTF
230	1013	Gospels	218	Royal Site of San Lorenzo de El Escorial, y, III, 5	San Lorenzo de El Escorial	Spain	INTF, CSNTM
231	12th	Gospels	181	Royal Site of San Lorenzo de El Escorial, y, III, 6	San Lorenzo de El Escorial	Spain	INTF
232	1302	Gospels	289	Royal Site of San Lorenzo de El Escorial, y, III, 7	San Lorenzo de El Escorial	Spain	INTF
233	13th	Gospels†	279	Royal Site of San Lorenzo de El Escorial, Y, II, 8	San Lorenzo de El Escorial	Spain	INTF
234	1278	Gospels, Acts, Pauline Epistles, General Epistles	315	Royal Danish Library, GKS 1322	Copenhagen	Denmark	INTF
235	1314	Gospels	280	Royal Danish Library, GKS 1323	Copenhagen	Denmark	INTF
236	11th	Gospels†	256	University of Birmingham Cadbury Research Library, Braithwaite 13	Birmingham	UK	INTF
237	11th	Gospels	289	State Historical Museum, V. 85, S. 41	Moscow	Russia	INTF
238	11th/12th	Gospels	355	State Historical Museum, Sinod. gr. 47 (Vlad. 091)	Moscow	Russia	INTF
238	11th/12th	Gospels	226	Russian State Archive of Ancient Acts, Ф. 1607, Nr. 3	Moscow	Russia	
239	11th	Mark, Luke, John	277	State Historical Museum, V. 84, S. 46	Moscow	Russia	INTF
240	12th	Zigabenus Commentary on the Gospels†	411	State Historical Museum, V. 87, S. 48	Moscow	Russia	INTF
241	11th	New Testament	353	Russian State Archive of Ancient Acts, Ф. 1607 14	Moscow	Russia	INTF
242	12th	New Testament	409	State Historical Museum, V. 25, S. 407	Moscow	Russia	
243	14th	Theophylact Commentary on Matthew, Luke	224	State Historical Museum, V. 92, S. 388	Moscow	Russia	INTF
244	12th	Zigabenus Commentary on the Gospels	274	State Historical Museum, V. 88, S. 220	Moscow	Russia	INTF
245	1199	Gospels	255	State Historical Museum, V. 16, S. 278	Moscow	Russia	INTF
246	14th	Gospels†	189	State Historical Museum, V. 19, S. 274	Moscow	Russia	INTF
247	12th	Gospels	222	State Historical Museum, V. 17, S. 400	Moscow	Russia	INTF
248	1275	Gospels	261	State Historical Museum, V. 18, S. 277	Moscow	Russia	INTF
249	12th	Gospel of John (Nicetas Catena)	808	State Historical Museum, V. 90, S. 93	Moscow	Russia	INTF
250	11th	Acts, Pauline Epistles, General Epistles, Revelation	379	National Library, Coislin 224	Paris	France	BnF, INTF
251	12th	Gospels	273	Russian State Library, F. 181.9 (Gr. 9)	Moscow	Russia	CSNTM, INTF
252 + [464]	11th	Gospels	123	Russian State Archive of Ancient Acts, Ф. 1607, Nr. 05	Moscow	Russia	INTF
252 + [464]	11th	Acts, Pauline Epistles, General Epistles	229	State Historical Museum, V. 23, S. 341	Moscow	Russia	INTF
253	10th	Gospels	248	Owner Unknown			
254	11th	Theophylact Commentary on Acts, Pauline Epistles, General Epistles, Revelation	453	National Library, 490	Athens	Greece	CSNTM
254	11th	Theophylact Commentary on Acts, Pauline Epistles, General Epistles, Revelation	453	National Library, 490	Athens	Greece	INTF
255	14th	Acts, Pauline Epistle], General Epistles	222	Jagiellonian Library Graec. qu. 40?	Kraków	Poland	
256	11th/12th	Acts†, Pauline Epistles†, General Epistles†, Revelation†	323	National Library, Armenien 27 (9)	Paris	France	INTF
257	14th	Acts, Pauline Epistles, General Epistles	116	Jagiellonian Library, Graec. qu. 43?	Kraków	Poland	
258	13th	Gospels	168	Saxon State and University Library Dresden (SLUB), Mscr. Dresd. A. 123	Dresden	Germany	INTF
259	10th	Gospels	262	State Historical Museum, V. 86, S. 44	Moscow	Russia	INTF
260	13th	Gospels	240	National Library, Grec 51	Paris	France	BnF, INTF, CSNTM
261	12th	Gospels†	175	National Library, Grec 52	Paris	France	BnF, INTF, CSNTM
262	10th	Gospels	212	National Library, Grec 53	Paris	France	INTF
263	13th	Gospels, Acts, Pauline Epistles, General Epistles	294	National Library, Grec 61	Paris	France	BnF, INTF, CSNTM
264	12th	Gospels†	287	National Library, Grec 65	Paris	France	BnF, INTF, CSNTM
265	12th	Gospels	372	National Library, Grec 66	Paris	France	BnF, INTF, CSNTM
266	13th	Gospels	282	National Library, Grec 67	Paris	France	BnF, INTF, CSNTM
267	12th	Gospels†	396	National Library, Grec 69	Paris	France	BnF, INTF, CSNTM
268	12th	Gospels	217	National Library, Grec 73	Paris	France	BnF, INTF, CSNTM
269	12th	Gospels	215	National Library, Grec 74	Paris	France	BnF, INTF, CSNTM
270	12th	Gospels	346	National Library, Grec 75	Paris	France	BnF, INTF, CSNTM
271	11th	Gospels	252	National Library, Supplement Grec 75	Paris	France	BnF, INTF
272	11th	Gospels	218	British Library, Add MS 15581	London	UK	BL
272	11th	Gospels	218	British Library, Add MS 15581	London	UK	INTF
273	13th	Gospels†	201	National Library, Grec 79	Paris	France	BnF, INTF
274	10th	Gospels†	232	National Library, Supplement Grec 79	Paris	France	BnF, INTF
275	12th	Gospels	230	National Library, Grec 80	Paris	France	BnF, INTF, CSNTM
276	1092	Gospels	307	National Library, Grec 81	Paris	France	BnF, INTF
277	11th	Gospels	261	National Library, Grec 81 A	Paris	France	INTF
278	1072	Gospels†	296	National Library, Grec 82	Paris	France	BnF, INTF, CSNTM
279	12th	Gospels	250	National Library, Grec 86	Paris	France	BnF, INTF, CSNTM
280	12th	Gospels	170	National Library, Grec 87	Paris	France	BnF, INTF, CSNTM
281	12th	Gospels†	249	National Library, Grec 88	Paris	France	BnF, INTF, CSNTM
282	1176	Gospels	150	National Library, Grec 90	Paris	France	BnF, INTF, CSNTM
283	13th	Gospels†	159	National Library, Grec 92	Paris	France	BnF, INTF, CSNTM
284	13th	Gospels	254	National Library, Grec 93	Paris	France	BnF, INTF, CSNTM
285	15th	Gospels	246	National Library, Grec 95	Paris	France	BnF, INTF, CSNTM
286	1432	Gospels	264	National Library, Grec 96	Paris	France	BnF, INTF
287	1482	Gospels	322	National Library, Grec 98	Paris	France	BnF, INTF, CSNTM
288 + [2532]	15th	Matthew	90	Bodleian Library, Canon. Gr. 33	Oxford	UK	INTF
288 + [2532]	15th	Mark	56	Corpus Christi College, MS. 224	Cambridge	UK	PL
288 + [2532]	15th	Luke	93	National Library, Grec 99	Paris	France	BnF, INTF
288 + [2532]	15th	John	67	Institut de France, Ms 536	Paris	France	INTF
289	1625	Gospels	336	National Library, Grec 100 A	Paris	France	INTF
290	14th	Gospels	259	National Library, Supplement Grec 108	Paris	France	BnF, INTF
291	13th	Gospels	290	National Library, Grec 113	Paris	France	BnF, INTF, CSNTM
292	12th/13th	Gospels†	290	National Library, Grec 114	Paris	France	BnF, INTF, CSNTM
293	1262	Gospels†	340	National Library, Grec 117	Paris	France	BnF, INTF
294	1391	Gospels†	238	National Library, Grec 118	Paris	France	BnF, INTF, CSNTM
295	13th	Gospels	239	National Library, Grec 120	Paris	France	BnF, INTF, CSNTM
[296]	16th	New Testament copied from printed text.	560	National Library, Grec 123, Grec 124	Paris	France	BnF, INTF, CSNTM
297	12th	Gospels	196	National Library, Supplement Grec 140	Paris	France	INTF
298	12th	Gospels	222	National Library, Supplement Grec 175	Paris	France	BnF, INTF
299	10th	Gospels	328	National Library, Grec 177	Paris	France	BnF, INTF, CSNTM
300	11th	Matthew, Mark, Luke	209	National Library, Grec 186	Paris	France	BnF, INTF, CSNTM

[top]

== Minuscules 301-400 ==
#	Date	Contents	Pages	Institution and refs.	City, State	Country	Images
301	11th	Gospels	221	National Library, Grec 187	Paris	France	BnF, INTF, CSNTM
302	11th	Acts†, Pauline Epistles^{P}†, General Epistles	333	National Library, Grec 103	Paris	France	BnF, INTF, CSNTM
303	1255	Theophylact Commentary on the Gospels†	321	National Library, Grec 194 A	Paris	France	BnF, INTF
304	12th	Matthew, Mark	241	National Library, Grec 194	Paris	France	BnF, INTF, CSNTM
305	13th	Zigabenus Commentary on the Gospels†	261	National Library, Grec 195	Paris	France	BnF, INTF, CSNTM
306	12th	Theophylact Commentary on Matthew, John†	559	National Library, Grec 197	Paris	France	BnF, INTF
307	10th	Acts, General Epistles	254	National Library, Coislin 25	Paris	France	BnF, INTF
308	14th	Acts†, Pauline epistles†, General Epistles†	145	British Library, Royal MS 1 B. I	London	UK	BL
308	14th	Acts†, Pauline epistles†, General Epistles†	145	British Library, Royal MS 1 B. I	London	UK	INTF
309	13th	Acts†, Romans-Titus†, General Epistles	159	Cambridge University Library, Dd. 11.90	Cambridge	UK	INTF
309	13th	Acts†, Romans-Titus†, General Epistles	159	Cambridge University Library, Dd. 11.90	Cambridge	UK	CSNTM
310	12th	Matthew† (Nicetas Catena)	378	National Library, Grec 202	Paris	France	BnF, INTF
311	12th	Matthew†	357	National Library, Grec 203	Paris	France	BnF, INTF, CSNTM
312	11th	Acts†, Pauline Epistles†, General Epistles	298	British Library, Add MS 5115, Add MS 5116	London	UK	BL
312	11th	Acts†, Pauline Epistles†, General Epistles	298	British Library, Add MS 5115, Add MS 5116	London	UK	INTF
313	15th	Luke 1:1–12:16†	460	National Library, Grec 208	Paris	France	BnF, INTF, CSNTM
314	11th	Acts^{S}†, Pauline Epistles†, General Epistles†, Revelation†	299	Bodleian Library, Ms. Barocci 3	Oxford	UK	DB
314	11th	Acts^{S}†, Pauline Epistles†, General Epistles†, Revelation†	299	Bodleian Library, Ms. Barocci 3	Oxford	UK	INTF
315	13th	Theophylact Commentary on John^{S}†	156	National Library, Grec 210	Paris	France	BnF, INTF, CSNTM
316	14th	Theophylact Commentary on Luke 18:18–24:53†; John 1:16–12:25†	129	National Library, Grec 211	Paris	France	BnF, INTF
317	12th	John† (Nicetas Catena)	352	National Library, Grec 212	Paris	France	BnF, INTF, CSNTM
318	14th	Theophylact Commentary on John† 7:9–12:8	16	National Library, Grec 213	Paris	France	BnF, INTF
319	12th	Acts^{S}†, Pauline Epistles, General Epistles^{S}†	303	Christ's College, G.G. 1.9 (Ms. 9)	Cambridge	UK	CSNTM
319	12th	Acts^{S}†, Pauline Epistles, General Epistles^{S}†	303	Christ's College, G.G. 1.9 (Ms. 9)	Cambridge	UK	INTF
320	12th	Theophylact Commentary on Luke	392	National Library, Grec 232	Paris	France	BnF, INTF
321	12th	Acts†, Pauline Epistles†, General Epistles	293	British Library, Harley MS 5557	London	UK	BL
321	12th	Acts†, Pauline Epistles†, General Epistles	293	British Library, Harley MS 5557	London	UK	INTF
322	14th	Acts, Pauline Epistles, General Epistles	134	British Library, Harley MS 5620	London	UK	BL
322	14th	Acts, Pauline Epistles, General Epistles	134	British Library, Harley MS 5620	London	UK	INTF
323	12th	Acts, Pauline Epistles, General Epistles	374	Geneva Library, Gr. 20	Geneva	Switzerland	INTF, CSNTM
324	14th	Gospels	170	National Library, Grec 376, fol. 146-315	Paris	France	BnF, INTF, CSNTM
325	11th	Acts^{S}†, Pauline Epistles, General Epistles^{S}†, Revelation	233	Bodleian Library, MS. Auct. E. 5.9	Oxford	UK	INTF
326	10th	Acts, Pauline Epistles†, General Epistles†	206	Lincoln College, Gr. 82	Oxford	UK	INTF
327	13th	Acts, Pauline Epistles, General Epistles	298	New College, 59	Oxford	UK	INTF
328	13th	Acts, Pauline Epistles, General Epistles	215	Leiden University Library, Voss. Gr. Q. 77	Leiden	Netherlands	INTF
329	12th	Gospels†	321	National Library, Coislin, Grec 19	Paris	France	BnF, INTF
330	12th	Gospels, Acts, Pauline Epistles, General Epistles	287	Russian National Library, Gr. 101	Saint Petersburg	Russia	INTF
331	11th	Gospels	275	National Library, Coislin, Grec 197	Paris	France	BnF, INTF
332	12th	Gospels	304	Turin National University Library, C. II. 4	Turin	Italy	INTF
333	1214	Matthew, John (Nicetas Catena)	377	Turin National University Library, B. I. 9	Turin	Italy	INTF
334	12th	Zigabenus Commentary on Matthew, Mark	271	Turin National University Library, B. III. 8	Turin	Italy	INTF
335	16th	Gospels	112	Turin National University Library, B. III. 2	Turin	Italy	INTF
336	15th	Acts, Pauline Epistles, General Epistles, Revelation	268	University of Hamburg, Cod. theol. 1252a	Hamburg	Germany	INTF
337	12th	Acts†, Pauline Epistles, General Epistles, Revelation†	375	National Library, Grec 56	Paris	France	BnF, INTF, CSNTM
338	10th	Gospels	365	Turin National University Library, B. VII. 33, B.VI.43	Turin	Italy	
339	13th	New Testament†	200	Turin National University Library, B. V. 8	Turin	Italy	INTF
340	14th	Gospels	243	Formerly, Turin National University Library, B. VII. 16 (destroyed)	Turin	Italy	
341	1296	Gospels	268	Formerly, Turin National University Library, B. VII. 14 (destroyed)	Turin	Italy	
342	13th	Gospels	300	Turin National University Library, B. V. 24	Turin	Italy	INTF
343	11th	Gospels	283	Ambrosiana Library, H 13 sup. (gr. 423)	Milan	Italy	INTF
344	10th	Gospels^{s}†	327	Ambrosiana Library, G 16 sup.	Milan	Italy	INTF
345	11th	Gospels	375	Ambrosiana Library, F 17 sup.	Milan	Italy	INTF
346	12th	Gospels†	168	Ambrosiana Library, S 23 sup.	Milan	Italy	INTF, CSNTM
347	12th	Gospels	245	Ambrosiana Library, R 35 sup.	Milan	Italy	INTF
348	1022	Gospels	187	Ambrosiana Library, B 56 sup.	Milan	Italy	INTF
349	1322	Gospels	399	Ambrosiana Library, F 61 sup. (gr. 342)	Milan	Italy	INTF
350	11th	Gospels†	305	Ambrosiana Library, B 62 sup.	Milan	Italy	INTF
351	12th	Gospels	268	Ambrosiana Library, B 70 sup.	Milan	Italy	INTF
352	11th	Gospels†	219	Ambrosiana Library, B 93 sup.	Milan	Italy	INTF
353	12th	Gospels†	194	Ambrosiana Library, M 93 sup.	Milan	Italy	INTF
354	11th	Theophylact Commentary on Matthew†	442	Marciana National Library, Gr. Z. 29 (497)	Venice	Italy	INTF
355	12th	Gospels	410	Marciana National Library, Gr. Z. 541 (558)	Venice	Italy	INTF
356	12th	Pauline Epistles†, 2 Peter 2:4-3:18†, 1 John 1:1-3:20†	145	Emmanuel College, I. 4. 35	Cambridge	UK	INTF
357	11th	Luke, John	281	Marciana National Library, Gr. Z. 28 (364)	Venice	Italy	INTF
358	14th	Gospels	203	Estense Library, G. 9, a.U.2.3. (II A 9)	Modena	Italy	INTF
359	13th	Gospels	310	Estense Library, G. 242, a.T.7.23. (III B 16)	Modena	Italy	INTF
360	11th	Gospels	220	Palatina Library, Ms. Parm. 2319	Parma	Italy	INTF
361	13th	Gospels	186	Palatina Library, Ms. Parm. 1821	Parma	Italy	INTF
362	13th	Luke 6:29–12:10 (Nicetas Catena)	314	Laurentian Library, Conv.Soppr.176	Florence	Italy	BML, CSNTM, INTF
363	14th	Gospels, Acts, Pauline Epistles, General Epistles	306	Laurentian Library, Plut.06.13	Florence	Italy	BML, INTF
364	10th	Gospels	284	Laurentian Library, Plut.06.24	Florence	Italy	BML, INTF
365	12th	Gospels, Acts, Pauline Epistles†, General Epistles†	356	Laurentian Library, Plut.06.36	Florence	Italy	BML, INTF, CSNTM
365	12th	Gospels, Acts, Pauline Epistles†, General Epistles†	356	Laurentian Library, Plut.06.36	Florence	Italy	CSNTM (2)
366	14th	Matthew†	323	Laurentian Library, Conv.Soppr.171	Florence	Italy	BML, CSNTM, INTF
367	1331	New Testament	349	Laurentian Library, Conv.Soppr.53	Florence	Italy	BML, CSNTM, INTF
368	15th	John, 1–3 John, Revelation	96	Biblioteca Riccardiana, 84	Florence	Italy	INTF
369	14th	Mark† 6:25–9:45, 10:17–16:9	23	Riccardian Library, 90	Florence	Italy	INTF
370	14th	Theophylact Commentary on the Gospels†	437	Riccardian Library, 5	Florence	Italy	INTF
371	10th	Gospels	315	Vatican Library, Vat.gr.1159	Vatican City	Vatican	DVL
371	10th	Gospels	315	Vatican Library, Vat.gr.1159	Vatican City	Vatican	INTF
372	16th	Gospels†	199	Vatican Library, Vat.gr.1161	Vatican City	Vatican	INTF
373	15th	Gospels	221	Vatican Library, Vat.gr.1423	Vatican City	Vatican	INTF
374	11th	Gospels	173	Vatican Library, Vat.gr.1445	Vatican City	Vatican	INTF
375	11th	Gospels	199	Vatican Library, Vat.gr.1533	Vatican City	Vatican	DVL
376	11th	Gospels	185	Vatican Library, Vat.gr.1539	Vatican City	Vatican	INTF
377	16th	Gospels	339	Vatican Library, Vat.gr.1618	Vatican City	Vatican	INTF
378	13th	Acts, Pauline Epistles, General Epistles	221	Bodleian Library, MS. E. D. Clarke 4	Oxford	UK	INTF
379	15th	Zigabenus Commentary on the Gospels	437	Vatican Library, Vat.gr.1769	Vatican City	Vatican	INTF
380	1499	Gospels	202	Vatican Library, Vat.gr.2139	Vatican City	Vatican	INTF
381	14th	Gospel of Luke	226	Vatican Library, Pal.gr.20	Vatican City	Vatican	HU
381	14th	Gospel of Luke	226	Vatican Library, Pal.gr.20	Vatican City	Vatican	INTF
382	11th	Gospels	167	Vatican Library, Vat.gr.2070	Vatican City	Vatican	INTF, CSNTM
383	13th	Acts, Pauline Epistles, General Epistles	181	Bodleian Library, MS. E. D. Clarke 9	Oxford	UK	INTF, CSNTM
384	13th	Acts, Pauline Epistles, General Epistles	132	British Library, Harley MS 5588	London	UK	BL
384	13th	Acts, Pauline Epistles, General Epistles	132	British Library, Harley MS 5588	London	UK	INTF
385	1407	Acts, Pauline Epistles, General Epistles†, Revelation†	267	British Library, Harley MS 5613	London	UK	BL
385	1407	Acts, Pauline Epistles, General Epistles†, Revelation†	267	British Library, Harley MS 5613	London	UK	INTF
386	14th	New Testament	393	Vatican Library, Ott.gr.66	Vatican City	Vatican	DVL, INTF
387	12th	Gospels	298	Vatican Library, Ott.gr.204	Vatican City	Vatican	DVL
387	12th	Gospels	298	Vatican Library, Ott.gr.204	Vatican City	Vatican	INTF
388	13th	Gospels	315	Vatican Library, Ott.gr.212	Vatican City	Vatican	DVL
388	13th	Gospels	315	Vatican Library, Ott.gr.212	Vatican City	Vatican	INTF
389	11th	Gospels	197	Vatican Library, Ott.gr.297	Vatican City	Vatican	DVL
389	11th	Gospels	197	Vatican Library, Ott.gr.297	Vatican City	Vatican	INTF
390	1281-2	Gospels, Acts, Pauline Epistles, General Epistles	336	Vatican Library, Ott.gr.381	Vatican City	Vatican	DVL
390	1281-2	Gospels, Acts, Pauline Epistles, General Epistles	336	Vatican Library, Ott.gr.381	Vatican City	Vatican	INTF
391	1055	Gospels†	232	Vatican Library, Ott.gr.432	Vatican City	Vatican	INTF
392	12th	Theophylact Commentary on the Gospels	385	Vatican Library, Barb.gr.521, fol. 7-391	Vatican City	Vatican	INTF
393	14th	Gospels, Acts, Pauline Epistles, General Epistles	222	Vallicelliana Library, ms.E. 22	Rome	Italy	INTF
394	1330	Gospels, Acts, Pauline Epistles, General Epistles	344	Vallicelliana Library, ms.F. 17	Rome	Italy	IC
394	1330	Gospels, Acts, Pauline Epistles, General Epistles	344	Vallicelliana Library, ms.F. 17	Rome	Italy	INTF
394	1330	Gospels, Acts, Pauline Epistles, General Epistles	344	Vallicelliana Library, ms.F. 17	Rome	Italy	CSNTM
395	12th	Gospels	170	Casanata Library, 165	Rome	Italy	INTF
396	12th	Gospels†	115	Vatican Library, Chig.R.IV.6	Vatican City	Vatican	INTF
397	10th/11th	John	295	Vallicelliana Library, ms.E. 40	Rome	Italy	IC
397	10th/11th	John	295	Vallicelliana Library, ms.E. 40	Rome	Italy	INTF
398	10th	Acts†, Pauline Epistles†, General Epistles	251	Cambridge University Library, Kk. 6.4	Cambridge	UK	CUDL, INTF, CSNTM
399	9th/10th	Gospels	214	National Library of Russia, Gr. 220	Saint Petersburg	Russia	INTF, CSNTM
400	15th	Matthew† 12:29-13:2, Acts†, Pauline Epistles†, General Epistles	249	Berlin State Library, Diez. A. Doud. 10	Berlin	Germany	INTF

[top]

== Minuscules 401-500 ==
#	Date	Contents	Pages	Institution and refs.	City, State	Country	Images
401	12th	Gospels†	113	Victor Emmanuel III National Library, Ms. II. A. 3	Naples	Italy	INTF
402	14th	Gospels	253	Victor Emmanuel III National Library, Ms. II. A. 5	Naples	Italy	INTF
403	13th	Gospels†	212	Victor Emmanuel III National Library, Ms. II. A. 4	Naples	Italy	INTF
404	13th	Acts, Pauline Epistles, General Epistles	157	Austrian National Library, Theol. gr. 313	Vienna	Austria	INTF, CSNTM
405	10th	Gospels†	223	Marciana National Library, Gr. I,10 (946)	Venice	Italy	INTF
406	11th	Gospels†	297	Marciana National Library, Gr. I,11 (1275)	Venice	Italy	INTF
407	12th	Luke† 5:30-24:53, John 1:1-9:2†	87	Marciana National Library, Gr. I,12 (434)	Venice	Italy	INTF
408	12th	Gospels	261	Marciana National Library, Gr. I,14 (1119)	Venice	Italy	INTF
409	14th	Gospels	210	Marciana National Library, Gr. I,15 (947)	Venice	Italy	INTF
410	13th	Gospels	213	Marciana National Library, Gr. I,17 (1211)	Venice	Italy	INTF
411	10th	Gospels	375	Marciana National Library, Gr. I,18 (1276)	Venice	Italy	INTF
412	1301	Gospels	329	Marciana National Library, Gr. I,19 (1416)	Venice	Italy	INTF
413	1302	Gospels	266	Marciana National Library, Gr. I,20 (1256)	Venice	Italy	INTF
414	14th	Gospels†	225	Marciana National Library, Gr. I,21 (1212)	Venice	Italy	INTF
415	1356	Gospels	226	Marciana National Library, Gr. I,22 (1417)	Venice	Italy	INTF
416	14th	Gospels†	153	Marciana National Library, Gr. I,24 (948)	Venice	Italy	INTF
417	14th	Matthew, Mark, and Luke†	112	Marciana National Library, Gr. I,25 (1356)	Venice	Italy	INTF
418	15th	Matthew, Mark 1:1-13:32†	120	Marciana National Library, Gr. I,28 (1450)	Venice	Italy	INTF
419	12th	Gospels†	262	Marciana National Library, Gr. I,60 (950)	Venice	Italy	INTF
420	10th	Matthew, Mark	127	University Library, F. V. 18	Messina	Italy	INTF
421	ca. 1300	Acts, Pauline Epistles, General Epistles	279	Austrian National Library, Theol. gr. 303	Vienna	Austria	INTF, CSNTM
422	11th	Gospels	256	Bavarian State Library, Cod.graec. 210	Munich	Germany	BSB
422	11th	Gospels	256	Bavarian State Library, Cod.graec. 210	Munich	Germany	INTF, CSNTM
423	1556	Matthew, John (Nicetas Catena)	465	Bavarian State Library, Cod.graec. 36, 37	Munich	Germany	INTF
424	11th	Acts, Pauline Epistles, General Epistles, Revelation	353	Austrian National Library, Theol. gr. 302	Vienna	Austria	INTF, CSNTM
425	1330	Acts, Pauline Epistles, General Epistles	159	Austrian National Library, Theol. gr. 221	Vienna	Austria	INTF, CSNTM
426	14th	Luke† 6:17–11:28 (Nicetas Catena)	208	Bavarian State Library, Cod.graec. 473	Munich	Germany	BSB, INTF
427	13th	Theophylact Commentary on Mark, Luke	140	Bavarian State Library, Cod.graec. 465	Munich	Germany	BSB, CSNTM, INTF
428	13th	Theophylact Commentary on the Gospels	335	Bavarian State Library, Cod.graec. 381	Munich	Germany	BSB, INTF
429	14th	Acts, Pauline Epistles, General Epistles	185	Herzog August Library, Codd. Aug. 16. 7. 4	Wolfenbüttel	Germany	INTF
430	11th	John 1:1–8:14† (Nicetas Catena)	366	Bavarian State Library, Cod.graec. 437	Munich	Germany	BSB, INTF
431	12th	Gospels, Acts, Pauline Epistles, General Epistles	275	Priesterseminarium, 1	Strasbourg	France	INTF
432	15th	Acts, Pauline Epistles, General Epistles, Book of Revelation	218	Vatican Library, Vat.gr.366	Vatican City	Vatican	DVL, INTF
433	11th	Gospels†	80	Jagiellonian Library, Graec. qu. 12	Kraków	Poland	INTF
434	13th	Luke 1:5–6:21† (Nicetas Catena)	424	Austrian National Library, Theol. Gr. 71	Vienna	Austria	INTF, CSNTM
435 + [576]	12th/13th	Gospels†	285	Leiden University Library, Gronov. 137	Leiden	Netherlands	LUL
435 + [576]	12th/13th	Matthew 22:4–19	1	Arundel Castle, M. D. 459, 1 fol.	Arundel, West Sussex	UK	CSNTM
436	11th/12th	Acts, Pauline Epistles, General Epistles	165	Vatican Library, Vat.gr.367	Vatican City	Vatican	INTF
437	11th	Acts	257	Vatican Library, Vat.gr.760	Vatican City	Vatican	INTF
438	12th	Gospels	452	British Library, Add MS 5111, Add MS 5112	London	UK	BL
438	12th	Gospels	452	British Library, Add MS 5111, Add MS 5112	London	UK	INTF
439	1159	Gospels	219	British Library, Add MS 5107	London	UK	BL
439	1159	Gospels	219	British Library, Add MS 5107	London	UK	INTF
440	12th	Gospels, Acts, Pauline Epistles, General Epistles	294	Cambridge University Library, Mm. 6.9	Cambridge	UK	INTF, CSNTM
440	12th	Gospels, Acts, Pauline Epistles, General Epistles	294	Cambridge University Library, Mm. 6.9	Cambridge	UK	CSNTM
441	13th	Acts† 8:14-28:31, Romans, 1 Corinthians 1:1-15:38†	90	Uppsala University, Gr. 1, p. 3–182	Uppsala	Sweden	UU
441	13th	Acts† 8:14-28:31, Romans, 1 Corinthians 1:1-15:38†	90	Uppsala University, Gr. 1, p. 3–182	Uppsala	Sweden	INTF
442	12th/13th	Pauline Epistles†, General Epistles	129	Uppsala University, Gr. 1, p. 183–440	Uppsala	Sweden	UU
442	12th/13th	Pauline Epistles†, General Epistles	129	Uppsala University, Gr. 1, p. 183–440	Uppsala	Sweden	INTF
443	12th	Gospels	235	Cambridge University Library, Nn. 2.36	Cambridge	UK	INTF, CSNTM
444	15th	Gospels, Acts, Pauline Epistles, General Epistles	324	British Library, Harley MS 5796	London	UK	BL
444	15th	Gospels, Acts, Pauline Epistles, General Epistles	324	British Library, Harley MS 5796	London	UK	INTF
445	1506	Gospels	194	British Library, Harley MS 5736	London	UK	BL
445	1506	Gospels	194	British Library, Harley MS 5736	London	UK	INTF
446	15th	Gospels†	228	British Library, Harley MS 5777	London	UK	BL
446	15th	Gospels†	228	British Library, Harley MS 5777	London	UK	INTF
447	15th	Gospels	329	British Library, Harley MS 5784	London	UK	BL
447	15th	Gospels	329	British Library, Harley MS 5784	London	UK	INTF
448	1478	Gospels	299	British Library, Harley MS 5790	London	UK	BL
448	1478	Gospels	299	British Library, Harley MS 5790	London	UK	INTF
449	13th	Gospels	317	British Library, Add MS 4950	London	UK	BL
449	13th	Gospels	317	British Library, Add MS 4950	London	UK	INTF
450	10th	Acts, Romans - Ephesians†, General Epistles	177	Vatican Library, Reg.Gr.29	Vatican City	Vatican	DVL, INTF
451	11th	Acts, Pauline Epistles, General Epistles	161	Vatican Library, Urb.Gr.3	Vatican City	Vatican	INTF
452	14th	Acts, Pauline Epistles, General Epistles	327	Vatican Library, Reg.gr.Pio.II.50	Vatican City	Vatican	INTF
453	14th	Acts, General Epistles	295	Vatican Library, Barb.gr.582	Vatican City	Vatican	INTF
454	10th	Acts, Pauline Epistles, General Epistles	244	Laurentian Library, Plut.04.01	Florence	Italy	BML, INTF
455	13th/14th	Theophylact Commentary on Acts, Pauline Epistles	285	Laurentian Library, Plut.04.05	Florence	Italy	BML, INTF
456	10th	Acts, Pauline Epistles, General Epistles, Revelation	377	Laurentian Library, Plut.04.30	Florence	Italy	BML, INTF
457	10th	Acts, Pauline Epistles, General Epistles	294	Laurentian Library, Plut.04.29	Florence	Italy	BML, INTF
458	11th	Acts, Pauline Epistles, General Epistles	276	Laurentian Library, Plut.04.31	Florence	Italy	BML, INTF
459	1092	Acts, Pauline Epistles, General Epistles, Revelation	276	Laurentian Library, Plut.04.32	Florence	Italy	BML, INTF
460	13th/14th	Acts†, Pauline Epistles†, General Epistles	302	Marciana National Library, Gr. Z. 11 (379)	Venice	Italy	IC
460	13th/14th	Acts†, Pauline Epistles†, General Epistles	302	Marciana National Library, Gr. Z. 11 (379)	Venice	Italy	INTF, CSNTM
461	835	Gospels	344	National Library of Russia, Gr. 219, 213 101	Saint Petersburg	Russia	INTF, CSNTM
462	13th	Acts, Pauline Epistles, General Epistles	240	State Historical Museum, V. 24, S. 346	Moscow	Russia	INTF
463	12th	Acts†, Pauline Epistles†, General Epistles†	235	State Historical Museum, V. 95, S. 346	Moscow	Russia	INTF
[464]=252							
465	11th	Acts, Pauline Epistles, General Epistles	157	National Library, Grec 57	Paris	France	BnF, INTF, CSNTM
466	11th	Acts†, Pauline Epistles†, General Epistles	174	National Library, Grec 58	Paris	France	BnF, INTF, CSNTM
467	15th	Acts, Pauline Epistles, General Epistles, Revelation	331	National Library, Grec 59	Paris	France	BnF, INTF
468	13th	Acts†, Pauline Epistles, General Epistles, Revelation	200	National Library, Grec 101	Paris	France	INTF
469	13th	Acts, Pauline Epistles†, General Epistles, Revelation	229	National Library, Grec 102 A	Paris	France	BnF, INTF
470	11th	Gospels	215	Lambeth Palace, MS1175	London	UK	LP
470	11th	Gospels	215	Lambeth Palace, MS1175	London	UK	INTF
471	12th	Gospels	240	Lambeth Palace, MS1176	London	UK	LP, INTF
472	13th	Gospels†	210	Lambeth Palace, MS1177	London	UK	LP
472	13th	Gospels†	210	Lambeth Palace, MS1177	London	UK	INTF
473	11th	Gospels	310	Lambeth Palace, MS1178	London	UK	LP, INTF
473	11th	Gospels	310	Lambeth Palace, MS1178	London	UK	CSNTM
474	11th	Gospels†	176	Lambeth Palace, MS1179	London	UK	LP, INTF
475	11th	Gospels†	272	Lambeth Palace, MS1192	London	UK	CSNTM
475	11th	Gospels†	272	Lambeth Palace, MS1192	London	UK	LP, INTF
476	11th	Gospels	218	British Library, Arundel MS 524	London	UK	BL
476	11th	Gospels	218	British Library, Arundel MS 524	London	UK	INTF
477	13th	Gospels	318	Trinity College, B. X. 17	Cambridge	UK	INTF
478	10th	Gospels	268	British Library, Add MS 11300	London	UK	BL
478	10th	Gospels	268	British Library, Add MS 11300	London	UK	INTF
479	13th	Gospels, Acts, Pauline Epistles, General Epistles	289	University of Birmingham Cadbury Research Library, Mingana Gr. 3	Birmingham	UK	UoB
479	13th	Gospels, Acts, Pauline Epistles, General Epistles	289	University of Birmingham Cadbury Research Library, Mingana Gr. 3	Birmingham	UK	INTF
480	1366	Gospels, Hebrews†	222	British Library, Burney MS 18	London	UK	BL
480	1366	Gospels, Hebrews†	222	British Library, Burney MS 18	London	UK	INTF, CSNTM
480	1366	Acts, General Epistles, Pauline Epistles	232	Destroyed, formerly: (Metz, Bibl. minuc., 4)			
481	10th	Gospels	218	British Library, Burney MS 19	London	UK	BL
481	10th	Gospels	218	British Library, Burney MS 19	London	UK	INTF
482	1285	Gospels	317	British Library, Burney MS 20	London	UK	BL, INTF
483	1295	Gospels, Acts, Pauline Epistles, General Epistles	361	Williams College, Chapin Libr., Cod. De Ricci, no. 1	Williamstown, MA	USA	INTF
484	1291-1292	Gospels	258	British Library, Burney MS 21	London	UK	BL
485	12th	Gospels†	230	British Library, Burney MS 23	London	UK	BL
486	15th	John	51	Lambeth Palace, MS2794, fol. 317-367	London	UK	LP
486	15th	John	51	Lambeth Palace, MS2794, fol. 317-367	London	UK	INTF, CSNTM
[487] = 1321							
[488] = 1326							
489	1315-6	Gospels, Acts†, Pauline Epistles, General Epistles	363	Trinity College, B. X. 16	Cambridge	UK	INTF, CSNTM
490	11th	Gospels†	192	British Library, Add MS 7141	London	UK	BL
491	11th	Gospels†, Acts†, Pauline Epistles, General Epistles	305	British Library, Add MS 11836	London	UK	BL
491	11th	Gospels†, Acts†, Pauline Epistles, General Epistles	305	British Library, Add MS 11836	London	UK	INTF
492	1325-6	Gospels	269	British Library, Add MS 11838	London	UK	BL
493	15th	Gospels†	157	British Library, Add MS 11839	London	UK	BL
494	14th	Gospels†	222	British Library, Add MS 32341	London	UK	BL
494	14th	Gospels†	222	British Library, Add MS 32341	London	UK	INTF
495	12th	Gospels	181	British Library, Add MS 16183	London	UK	BL
495	12th	Gospels	181	British Library, Add MS 16183	London	UK	INTF
496	13th	Gospels, Acts, Pauline Epistles, General Epistles	300	British Library, Add MS 16184	London	UK	BL
496	13th	Gospels, Acts, Pauline Epistles, General Epistles	300	British Library, Add MS 16184	London	UK	INTF
497	11th	Gospels	184	British Library, Add MS 16943	London	UK	BL
498	13th	New Testament†	186	British Library, Add MS 17469	London	UK	BL
498	13th	New Testament†	186	British Library, Add MS 17469	London	UK	INTF
499	12th	Gospels†	216	British Library, Add MS 17741	London	UK	BL
500	13th	Matthew, Mark, Luke†	244	British Library, Add MS 17982	London	UK	BL
500	13th	Matthew, Mark, Luke†	244	British Library, Add MS 17982	London	UK	INTF

[top]

== Minuscules 501-600 ==
#	Date	Contents	Pages	Institution and refs.	City, State	Country	Images
501	13th	Gospels^{S}†	157	British Library, Add MS 18211	London	UK	BL
501	13th	Gospels^{S}†	157	British Library, Add MS 18211	London	UK	INTF
502	12th	Gospels†	235	British Library, Add MS 19387	London	UK	BL
502	12th	Gospels†	235	British Library, Add MS 19387	London	UK	INTF
503	13th	John	60	British Library, Add MS 19389	London	UK	BL
503	13th	John	60	British Library, Add MS 19389	London	UK	INTF
504	1033	Gospels	287	British Library, Add MS 17470	London	UK	BL
504	1033	Gospels	287	British Library, Add MS 17470	London	UK	INTF
505	12th	Gospels	226	British Library, Harley MS 5538	London	UK	BL
505	12th	Gospels	226	British Library, Harley MS 5538	London	UK	INTF
506	11th	New Testament†	240	Christ Church, Wake 12	Oxford	UK	INTF
507	11th	Gospels	221	Christ Church, Wake 21	Oxford	UK	INTF
508	13th	Gospels†	168	Christ Church, Wake 22	Oxford	UK	INTF
509	12th	Gospels	229	Christ Church, Wake 24	Oxford	UK	INTF
510	12th	Gospels	305	Christ Church, Wake 25	Oxford	UK	INTF
511	13th	Gospels†	337	Christ Church, Wake 27	Oxford	UK	INTF
512	14th	Gospels	210	Christ Church, Wake 28	Oxford	UK	INTF
513	1130	Gospels†	162	Christ Church, Wake 29	Oxford	UK	INTF
514	12th	Gospels	227	Christ Church, Wake 30	Oxford	UK	INTF
515	11th	Gospels	127	Christ Church, Wake 31	Oxford	UK	INTF
516	11th	Gospels	287	Christ Church, Wake 32	Oxford	UK	INTF
517	11th/12th	New Testament †	201	Christ Church, Wake 34	Oxford	UK	CSNTM, INTF
518	12th	Gospels	249	Christ Church, Wake 36	Oxford	UK	INTF
519	13th	Gospels	308	Christ Church, Wake 39	Oxford	UK	INTF
520	12th	Gospels	213	Christ Church, Wake 40	Oxford	UK	INTF
521	1321/1322	Gospels	271	Bodleian Library, MS. Gr. bib. d. 1	Oxford	UK	INTF
522	1515/1516	New Testament	319	Bodleian Library, MS. Canon. Gr. 34	Oxford	UK	INTF
523	14th	Gospels	270	Bodleian Library, MS. Canon. Gr. 36	Oxford	UK	INTF
523	14th	Gospels	270	Bodleian Library, MS. Canon. Gr. 36	Oxford	UK	DB
524	12th	Gospels	184	Bodleian Library, MS. Canon. Gr. 112	Oxford	UK	INTF
525	15th	Gospels (gr-sl)	312	Bodleian Library, MS. Canon. Gr. 122	Oxford	UK	INTF
525	15th	Gospels (gr-sl)	312	Bodleian Library, MS. Canon. Gr. 122	Oxford	UK	DB
526	11th	Luke 23:38-50; 24:46-53; John 1:30-3:5	6	Bodleian Library, MS. Barocci 59	Oxford	UK	DB
526	11th	Luke 23:38-50; 24:46-53; John 1:30-3:5	6	Bodleian Library, MS. Barocci 59	Oxford	UK	INTF
527	11th	Gospels	216	Bodleian Library, MS. Cromwell 15	Oxford	UK	INTF
528	11th	Gospels	354	Bodleian Library, MS. Cromwell 16	Oxford	UK	INTF
528	11th	Gospels	354	Bodleian Library, MS. Cromwell 16	Oxford	UK	DB
529	12th	Gospels	362	Bodleian Library, MS. Auct. D. inf. 2. 21	Oxford	UK	INTF
530	11th	Gospels†	303	Bodleian Library, MS. Rawl. G. 3	Oxford	UK	INTF
531	12th	Mark, Luke	96	University of Birmingham Cadbury Research Library, Braithwaite 1	Birmingham	UK	INTF
532	11th	Gospels†	249	University of Michigan, Ms. 22	Ann Arbor	USA	CSNTM
532	11th	Gospels†	249	University of Michigan, Ms. 22	Ann Arbor	USA	INTF
533	13th	Gospels†	237	University of Michigan, Ms. 21	Ann Arbor	USA	CSNTM, INTF
534	12th	Gospels†	270	University of Michigan, Ms. 26	Ann Arbor	USA	CSNTM
534	12th	Gospels†	270	University of Michigan, Ms. 26	Ann Arbor	USA	INTF
535	13th	Matthew, Mark	125	University of Michigan, Ms. 20	Ann Arbor	USA	CSNTM, INTF
536	13th	Gospels, Acts†, Pauline Epistles	174	University of Michigan, Ms. 24	Ann Arbor	USA	CSNTM, INTF
537	12th	Gospels	144	University of Michigan, Ms. 19	Ann Arbor	USA	CSNTM, INTF
538	12th	Gospels†	212	University of Michigan, Ms. 18	Ann Arbor	USA	CSNTM
538	12th	Gospels†	212	University of Michigan, Ms. 18	Ann Arbor	USA	INTF
539	11th	Gospels†	173	Owner unknown. Formerly: Sotheby			
540	14th	Gospel of Mark†	27	University of Michigan, Ms. 23a	Ann Arbor	USA	CSNTM, INTF
541	15th	Matthew†, Mark†	49	University of Michigan, Ms. 23b	Ann Arbor	USA	CSNTM, INTF
542=2603							
543	12th	Gospels†	184	University of Michigan, Ms. 15	Ann Arbor	USA	CSNTM, INTF
544	13th	Gospels	256	University of Michigan, Ms. 25	Ann Arbor	USA	CSNTM
544	13th	Gospels	256	University of Michigan, Ms. 25	Ann Arbor	USA	INTF
545	1430	Gospels	430	University of Michigan, Ms. 30	Ann Arbor	USA	CSNTM, INTF
546	13th	Gospels†	276	University of Michigan, Ms. 27	Ann Arbor	USA	CSNTM, INTF
547	11th	Gospels, Acts, Pauline Epistles, General Epistles	348	British Library, Add MS 39590	London	UK	BL
547	11th	Gospels, Acts, Pauline Epistles, General Epistles	348	British Library, Add MS 39590	London	UK	INTF
548	11th	Gospels	166	British Library, Add MS 39591	London	UK	BL
548	11th	Gospels	166	British Library, Add MS 39591	London	UK	INTF
549	11th	Gospels	217	British Library, Add MS 39592	London	UK	BL
549	11th	Gospels	217	British Library, Add MS 39592	London	UK	INTF
550	12th	Gospels	211	British Library, Add MS 39593	London	UK	BL
550	12th	Gospels	211	British Library, Add MS 39593	London	UK	INTF
551	12th	Gospels	233	British Library, Add MS 39594	London	UK	BL
552	12th	Gospels	252	British Library, Add MS 39595	London	UK	BL
552	12th	Gospels	252	British Library, Add MS 39595	London	UK	INTF
553	13th	Gospels	303	British Library, Add MS 39596	London	UK	BL
553	13th	Gospels	303	British Library, Add MS 39596	London	UK	INTF
554	1271-2	Gospels	230	British Library, Add MS 39597	London	UK	BL
555	15th	Gospels	185	Cambridge University Library, Hh. 6.12	Cambridge	UK	INTF
556	12th	Gospels	197	Bodmer Library, Cod. Bodmer 25	Cologny	Switzerland	e-codices, INTF
557	13th	Gospels	183	Bodleian Library, MS. Holkham Gr. 114	Oxford	UK	INTF
557	13th	Gospels	183	Bodleian Library, MS. Holkham Gr. 114	Oxford	UK	DB
558	13th	Gospels	352	Bodleian Library, MS. Holkham Gr. 115	Oxford	UK	INTF
558	13th	Gospels	352	Bodleian Library, MS. Holkham Gr. 115	Oxford	UK	DB
559	11th	Gospels†	152	Sion College, Arc L 40.2/G 3	London	UK	INTF
559	11th	Gospels†	152	Sion College, Arc L 40.2/G 3	London	UK	LP
560	11th	Gospels	367	Glasgow University Library, Ms. Hunter 475	Glasgow	UK	CSNTM, INTF
560	11th	Gospels	367	Glasgow University Library, Ms. Hunter 475	Glasgow	UK	UOG
561	13th	Gospels	290	Glasgow University Library, Ms. Hunter 476	Glasgow	UK	CSNTM
561	13th	Gospels	290	Glasgow University Library, Ms. Hunter 476	Glasgow	UK	INTF
562	16th	John	79	Glasgow University Library, Ms. Hunter 170	Glasgow	UK	CSNTM
562	16th	John	79	Glasgow University Library, Ms. Hunter 170	Glasgow	UK	INTF
563	11th	Gospels	198	Edinburgh University Library, Ms. 219	Edinburgh	UK	CSNTM
563	11th	Gospels	198	Edinburgh University Library, Ms. 219	Edinburgh	UK	INTF
564	10th	Gospels	360	Leipzig University Library, Cod. Gr. 6	Leipzig	Germany	INTF
565	9th	Gospels†	405	National Library of Russia, Gr. 53	Saint Petersburg	Russia	INTF
566 + [2149]	9th	Matthew and Mark	122	National Library of Russia, Gr. 54, Gr. 282	Saint Petersburg	Russia	INTF
567	13th	Acts†, General Epistles†, Pauline Epistles†	243	National Library, Grec 103 A	Paris	France	BnF, INTF
568	10th	Gospels	259	National Library of Russia, Gr. 67	Saint Petersburg	Russia	INTF
569	1061	Gospels	358	National Library of Russia, Gr. 72	Saint Petersburg	Russia	INTF
570	12th	Gospels†	194	National Library of Russia, Gr. 97	Saint Petersburg	Russia	INTF
571	12th	Gospels†	194	National Library of Russia, Gr. 98	Saint Petersburg	Russia	INTF
[572] = 1231							
573	13th	Gospels	189	University of Birmingham Cadbury Research Library, Braithwaite 2	Birmingham	UK	INTF
574	13th	Gospels†	215	National Library of Russia, Gr. 105	Saint Petersburg	Russia	INTF
575	15th	Gospels	386	National Library of Russia, Gr. 118	Saint Petersburg	Russia	INTF
[576] + 435							
577	1346	Gospels	259	Interuniversity Library, H. 446	Montpellier	France	INTF
578	1361	Gospels	241	Public Library, 970	Arras	France	INTF
579	13th	Gospels	152	National Library, Grec 97	Paris	France	BnF, INTF, CSNTM
580	12th	Gospels	385	National Library, Grec 119	Paris	France	BnF, INTF
581	14th	Gospels	237	Ariostea Municipal Library, Cl. II, 119	Ferrara	Italy	INTF
582	1334	New Testament	114	Ariostea Municipal Library, Cl. II, 187	Ferrara	Italy	INTF
583	11th	Gospels	285	Palatina Library, Ms. Pal. 5	Parma	Italy	INTF
584	10th	Gospels	319	Palatina Library, Ms. Parm. 65	Parma	Italy	INTF
585	11th	Gospels	300	Estense Library, G. 1, α.M.9.5. (II A 1)	Modena	Italy	INTF
586	14th	Gospels	239	Estense Library, G. 5, α.M.9.14. (II A 5)	Modena	Italy	CSNTM
586	14th	Gospels	239	Estense Library, G. 5, α.M.9.14. (II A 5)	Modena	Italy	INTF
587	12th	Gospels	183	Ambrosiana Library, M 48 sup.	Milan	Italy	INTF
588	1321	Gospels†	221	Ambrosiana Library, E 63 sup.	Milan	Italy	INTF
589	14th	Theophylact Commentary on Luke†, John†	120	Ambrosiana Library, A 178 sup.	Milan	Italy	INTF
590	13th	Theophylact Commentary on Matthew, Mark	161	Palatina Library, Ms. Pal. 15	Parma	Italy	INTF
591	13th	Gospels	220	Library of the National Lincei and Corsinian Academy, Rossi 24 (41.G.16)	Rome	Italy	INTF
592	1289	Gospels, Acts, Pauline Epistles, General Epistles	295	Ambrosiana Library, Z 34 sup.	Milan	Italy	INTF
593	13th	Mark†, Luke†, John†	153	Marciana National Library, Gr. I,58 (1214)	Venice	Italy	INTF
594	14th	Matthew, Mark, Luke 1:1-23:15, 23:33-48†	241	San Lazzaro Library, 1531	Venice	Italy	INTF
595	16th	Gospels†	155	Marciana National Library, Gr. I,56 (1324)	Venice	Italy	INTF
596	11th	Theophylact Commentary on Matthew, Mark†	228	Marciana National Library, Gr. I,57 (995)	Venice	Italy	INTF
597	13th	Gospels	259	Marciana National Library, Gr. I,59 (1277)	Venice	Italy	INTF
598	13th	Luke	58	Marciana National Library, Gr. Z. 494 (331), fol. 1-58	Venice	Italy	INTF
599	15th	Gospels	441	Marciana National Library, Gr. Z. 495 (1048)	Venice	Italy	INTF
600	14th	Zigabenus Commentary on the Gospels	430	Marciana National Library, Gr. II. 7 (979)	Venice	Italy	INTF

[top]

== Minuscules 601-700 ==
#	Date	Contents	Pages	Institution and refs.	City, State	Country	Images
601	13th	Acts, Pauline Epistles†, General Epistles	257	National Library, Grec 104	Paris	France	BnF, INTF, CSNTM
602	10th	Acts†, General Epistles†, Pauline Epistles†	248	National Library, Grec 105	Paris	France	BnF, INTF, CSNTM
603	14th	Acts, Pauline Epistles, General Epistles	276	National Library, Grec 106 A	Paris	France	BnF, INTF
604	14th	Acts, Pauline Epistles, General Epistles	394	National Library, Grec 125	Paris	France	BnF, INTF, CSNTM
605	10th	Acts, Pauline Epistles, General Epistles	333	National Library, Grec 216	Paris	France	BnF
605	10th	Acts, Pauline Epistles, General Epistles	333	National Library, Grec 216	Paris	France	INTF
606	11th	Theodoret Commentary on Acts, Pauline Epistles, General Epistles	373	National Library, Grec 217	Paris	France	BnF, INTF, CSNTM
607	11th	Acts, Pauline Epistles, General Epistles (no commentary)	317	National Library, Grec 218	Paris	France	BnF, INTF
608	14th	Theophylact Commentary on Acts, Pauline Epistles, General Epistles	388	National Library, Grec 220	Paris	France	BnF, INTF
609 + [2152]	1043	Gospel of Luke†	315	National Library, Supplement Grec 911	Paris	France	BnF, INTF
609 + [2152]	1043	Gospel of Luke†	2	National Library of Russia, Gr. 290, (Luke 8:8-14)	Saint Petersburg	Russia	INTF
610	12th	Acts†, General Epistles†	177	National Library, Grec 221	Paris	France	BnF, INTF, CSNTM
611	12th	Acts†, Pauline Epistles†, General Epistles	295	Formerly, Turin National University Library, C. VI. 19 (destroyed)	Turin	Italy	
612	12th	Acts†, Pauline Epistles, General Epistles	370	Turin National University Library, B. V. 19, B.VI.43	Turin	Italy	INTF
613	12th	Acts, Pauline Epistles, General Epistles	174	Turin National University Library, C. V. 1	Turin	Italy	INTF
614	13th	Acts, Pauline Epistles, General Epistles	276	Ambrosiana Library, E 97 sup.	Milan	Italy	INTF
615	15th	Pauline Epistles, General Epistles	202	Ambrosiana Library, E 102 sup.	Milan	Italy	INTF
616	1434	Acts, Pauline Epistles, General Epistles, Revelation	164	Ambrosiana Library, H 104 sup.	Milan	Italy	INTF
617	11th	Acts†, Pauline Epistles†, General Epistles, Revelation	268	Marciana National Library, Gr. Z. 546 (786)	Venice	Italy	INTF
618	12th	Acts†, Pauline Epistles†, General Epistles†	292	Estense Library, G. 243, a.F.1.28. (III B 17)	Modena	Italy	INTF
619	984	Pauline Epistles	264	Laurentian Library, Conv. Soppr. 191, (f. 72-341)	Florence	Italy	BML, CSNTM, INTF
620	12th	Pauline Epistles†, General Epistles, Revelation	150	Laurentian Library, Conv. Soppr. 150	Florence	Italy	BML, CSNTM, INTF
621	11th	Acts, Romans - 1 Corinthians, General Epistles	164	Vatican Library, Vat.gr.1270	Vatican City	Vatican City	DVL, INTF
622	12th	Commentary on Pauline Epistles†, General Epistles†	270	Vatican Library, Vat.gr.1430	Vatican City	Vatican City	INTF
623	1037	Chrysostom Commentary on Acts†, Pauline Epistles, General Epistles	187	Vatican Library, Vat.gr.1650	Vatican City	Vatican City	INTF
624	11th	Acts†, Romans† - 1 Corinthians†, General Epistles†	46	Vatican Library, Vat.gr.1714	Vatican City	Vatican City	INTF
625	12th/13th	Acts, Pauline Epistles, General Epistles	481	Vatican Library, Vat.gr.1761	Vatican City	Vatican City	INTF
626	10th	Acts†, James, 1 Peter	84	Vatican Library, Vat.gr.1968	Vatican City	Vatican City	INTF
627	10th	Acts†, Pauline Epistles†, General Epistles, Revelation	187	Vatican Library, Vat.gr.2062	Vatican City	Vatican City	DVL, INTF
628	14th	Acts†, Pauline Epistles, General Epistles, Revelation†	216	Vatican Library, Ott.gr.258	Vatican City	Vatican City	INTF
629	14th	Acts, Pauline Epistles, General Epistles	265	Vatican Library, Ott.gr.298	Vatican City	Vatican City	DVL
629	14th	Acts, Pauline Epistles, General Epistles	265	Vatican Library, Ott.gr.298	Vatican City	Vatican City	INTF, CSNTM
630	12th/13th	Acts, Pauline Epistles, General Epistles	215	Vatican Library, Ott.gr.325	Vatican City	Vatican City	DVL
630	12th/13th	Acts, Pauline Epistles, General Epistles	215	Vatican Library, Ott.gr.325	Vatican City	Vatican City	INTF
631	15th	General Epistles†	24	Vatican Library, Ott.gr.417, fol. 49-72	Vatican City	Vatican City	INTF
632	12th/14th	Acts, Pauline Epistles, General Epistles, Revelation	258	Vallicelliana Library, ms.B. 86	Rome	Italy	BV
632	12th/14th	Acts, Pauline Epistles, General Epistles, Revelation	258	Vallicelliana Library, ms.B. 86	Rome	Italy	INTF
633	14th	Acts†, Pauline Epistles, General Epistles	204	Vallicelliana Library, ms.F. 13	Rome	Italy	BV
633	14th	Acts†, Pauline Epistles, General Epistles	204	Vallicelliana Library, ms.F. 13	Rome	Italy	INTF
634	1394	Acts, Pauline Epistles, General Epistles	248	Vatican Library, Chig.R.V.29	Vatican City	Vatican City	DVL
634	1394	Acts, Pauline Epistles, General Epistles	248	Vatican Library, Chig.R.V.29	Vatican City	Vatican City	INTF
635	11th	Acts, Pauline Epistles, General Epistles	243	Victor Emmanuel III National Library, Ms. II. A. 8	Naples	Italy	INTF
636	15th	Acts, Pauline Epistles, General Epistles	211	Victor Emmanuel III National Library, Ms. II. A. 9	Naples	Italy	INTF
637	12th	Acts, Pauline Epistles, General Epistles	242	University Library, 104	Messina	Italy	INTF
638	11th	Acts, Pauline Epistles, General Epistles	306	Christ Church, Wake 38	Oxford	United Kingdom	INTF
639	11th	Acts†, Pauline Epistles, General Epistles†	237	Christ Church, Wake 37, f. 237	Oxford	United Kingdom	INTF
640	11th	Epistle of James 1:1-23	2	British Library, Add MS 19392a	London	United Kingdom	BL
640	11th	Epistle of James 1:1-23	2	British Library, Add MS 19392a	London	United Kingdom	INTF
641	11th	Acts†, Pauline Epistles†, General Epistles	248	British Library, Add MS 22734	London	United Kingdom	BL
641	11th	Acts†, Pauline Epistles†, General Epistles	248	British Library, Add MS 22734	London	United Kingdom	INTF
642	14th	Acts†, Pauline Epistles†, General Epistles	209	Lambeth Palace, MS1185	London	United Kingdom	CSNTM
643	12th/13th	James - 3 John	15	British Library, Burney MS 48, Bd. II, fol. 230-244	London	United Kingdom	BL
643	12th/13th	James - 3 John	15	British Library, Burney MS 48, Bd. II, fol. 230-244	London	United Kingdom	INTF
644	14th	2 Corinthians - Hebrews, James - 1 Peter	94	British Library, Add MS 19388	London	United Kingdom	BL
644	14th	2 Corinthians - Hebrews, James - 1 Peter	94	British Library, Add MS 19388	London	United Kingdom	INTF
645	1304-5	Gospels	279	British Library, Add MS 22506	London	United Kingdom	BL
646	16th	Gospels	214	National Library, Taphos 218	Athens	Greece	INTF
647=[2371]	11th	Gospels	297	Walters Art Museum, Ms. W. 529	Baltimore, MD	United States	WAM
648	14th	Gospels†	227	National Library, Taphos 282	Athens	Greece	INTF
649	1305	Theophylact Commentary on the Gospels†	296	Turkish Historical Society, 1	Ankara	Turkey	INTF
650	12th	Gospels†	217	Turkish Historical Society, 5	Ankara	Turkey	INTF
651	11th	Gospels	190	Anhaltinian Regional Library	Dessau	Germany	INTF
652	10th	Gospels	305	Bavarian State Library, Cod.graec. 594	Munich	Germany	BSB, INTF
653	1077	Matthew, John	266	Jagiellonian Library, Graec. Oct. 3	Kraków	Poland	INTF
653	1077	Matthew, John	1	National Library of Russia, Gr. 292	Saint Petersburg	Russia	INTF
654	12th	Gospels†	179	Jagiellonian Library, Graec. Oct. 4	Kraków	Poland	
655	11th/12th	Gospels	324	Berlin State Library, Graec. qu. 39	Berlin	Germany	INTF
656	12th	Luke† 14:51-53, John, Acts, Romans - 1 Thessalonians, General Epistles	140	Berlin State Library, Graec. oct. 9	Berlin	Germany	INTF
657 = [838]	11th/12th	Gospels†	296	Berlin State Library, Graec. oct. 12	Berlin	Germany	INTF
658	12th/13th	Gospels	220	Jagiellonian Library, Hss. Graec. qu. 47	Kraków	Poland	
659	12th	Gospels	293	Jagiellonian Library, Hss. Graec. qu. 55?	Kraków	Poland	
660	12th	Gospels†	341	Berlin State Library, Hss. Graec. qu. 66	Berlin	Germany	INTF
661	11th	Gospels	234	Jagiellonian Library, Hss. Graec. qu. 67	Kraków	Poland	
662	12th	Gospels	254	National Gallery of Victoria, Ms. 710/5	Melbourne	Australia	CSNTM
662	12th	Gospels	254	National Gallery of Victoria, Ms. 710/5	Melbourne	Australia	INTF
663	13th	Gospels	277	National and University Library, Ms. 1907	Strasbourg	France	BnF
663	13th	Gospels	277	National and University Library, Ms. 1907	Strasbourg	France	INTF
664	15th	New Testament	233	Christian Weise Library, A 1	Zittau	Germany	INTF
665	13th	Acts, Pauline Epistles^{S}†, General Epistles†	149	Bodleian Library, Auct. F. 6. 24	Oxford	United Kingdom	INTF
666	13th	Gospels†	298	Harvard University Library, Ms. Gr. 1	Cambridge, MA	United States	INTF
667	11th/12th	Gospels	178	Owner Unknown (formerly, Drew University)			
668	13th/14th	Gospels	201	Syracuse University, Ms. 226.048G	Syracuse, NY	United States	INTF
669	10th	Gospels†	272	Dumbarton Oaks, Ms. 6, (Acc. No. BZ.2017.001)	Washington, DC	United States	CSNTM
669	10th	Gospels†	272	Dumbarton Oaks, Ms. 6, (Acc. No. BZ.2017.001)	Washington, DC	United States	INTF
670	11th/12th	Gospel of Luke 8:3-24, 9:13-34	2	Owner unknown			
671	12th	Gospels†	104	Owner unknown			
672	11th	Gospels†	278	Cambridge University Library, Add. Mss. 720	Cambridge	United Kingdom	INTF, CSNTM
673	12th	Matthew†, Mark†, Luke†	164	Cambridge University Library, Add. Mss. 1837	Cambridge	United Kingdom	INTF
674	12th	Matthew 10:42-12:43†	4	Cambridge University Library, Add. Mss. 1879.11	Cambridge	United Kingdom	CSNTM, INTF
675	13th	Matthew 26:20-39	2	Cambridge University Library, Add. Mss. 1879.24	Cambridge	United Kingdom	CSNTM, INTF
676	13th	Gospels†, Acts, Pauline Epistles, General Epistles	344	INTF, Ms. 2	Münster	Germany	CSNTM, INTF
677	13th	Gospels†	222	University of Chicago Library, Goodspeed Gr. 232	Chicago	United States	TUOCL
677	13th	Gospels†	222	University of Chicago Library, Goodspeed Gr. 232	Chicago	United States	INTF
678	12th	Gospels	395	Dumbarton Oaks, Ms. 5	Washington, DC	United States	HL, INTF
679	13th	Gospels	240	J. Paul Getty Museum, Ludw. II 5 (Phillipps 3887)	Malibu, CA	United States	JPGM
679	13th	Gospels	240	J. Paul Getty Museum, Ludw. II 5 (Phillipps 3887)	Malibu, CA	United States	INTF
680	14th	New Testament	190	Yale University Library, Beinecke MS 248	New Haven, CT	United States	YUL
680	14th	New Testament	190	Yale University Library, Beinecke MS 248	New Haven, CT	United States	INTF
680	14th	New Testament	190	Yale University Library, Beinecke MS 248	New Haven, CT	United States	CSNTM
681	13th	Gospels	251	Owner unknown			
682	11th	Gospels	309	The Van Kampen Foundation, VK 905	(Unknown)	United States	CSNTM, INTF
683	13th	Gospels	206	Bodleian Library, MS. Holkham Gr. 4	Oxford	United Kingdom	INTF
684	1228	Theophylact Commentary on the Gospels	300	Bodleian Library, MS. Holkham Gr. 64	Oxford	United Kingdom	INTF
685	13th	Gospels	229	University of Michigan, Mississippi 151	Ann Arbor	United States	CSNTM, INTF
686	1337	Gospels	226	British Library, Add MS 5468	London	United Kingdom	BL
687	11th	Matthew 10:33-18:16†	7	British Library, Add MS 11868B	London	United Kingdom	BL
687	11th	Matthew 10:33-18:16†	7	British Library, Add MS 11868B	London	United Kingdom	INTF
688	1179	Gospels	226	British Library, Add MS 22736	London	United Kingdom	BL
688	1179	Gospels	226	British Library, Add MS 22736	London	United Kingdom	INTF
689	13th	Gospels	313	British Library, Add MS 22737	London	United Kingdom	BL
689	13th	Gospels	313	British Library, Add MS 22737	London	United Kingdom	INTF
690	14th	Gospels	237	British Library, Add MS 22738	London	United Kingdom	BL
690	14th	Gospels	237	British Library, Add MS 22738	London	United Kingdom	INTF
691	14th	Gospels	275	British Library, Add MS 22739	London	United Kingdom	BL
692	14th	Matthew, Mark, Luke	237	British Library, Add MS 22740	London	United Kingdom	BL
692	14th	Matthew, Mark, Luke	237	British Library, Add MS 22740	London	United Kingdom	INTF
693	14th	Gospel†	208	British Library, Add MS 22741	London	United Kingdom	BL
693	14th	Gospel†	208	British Library, Add MS 22741	London	United Kingdom	INTF
694	15th	Gospels	211	British Library, Add MS 24112	London	United Kingdom	BL
695	13th	Gospels†	299	British Library, Add MS 24373	London	United Kingdom	BL
695	13th	Gospels†	299	British Library, Add MS 24373	London	United Kingdom	INTF
696	13th	Gospels	350	British Library, Add MS 24376	London	United Kingdom	BL
697	13th	Gospels	242	British Library, Add MS 26103	London	United Kingdom	BL
697	13th	Gospels	242	British Library, Add MS 26103	London	United Kingdom	INTF
698	14th	Mark, Luke, John	186	British Library, Add MS 27861	London	United Kingdom	BL
699	11th	Gospels, Acts, General Epistles, Romans 1:1-16:19†, 1 Corinthians† 1:11-end, 2 Corinthians 1:1-10:9†, Galatians† 1:12-end	302	British Library, Add MS 28815	London	United Kingdom	BL
699	11th	Gospels, Acts, General Epistles, Romans 1:1-16:19†, 1 Corinthians† 1:11-end, 2 Corinthians 1:1-10:9†, Galatians† 1:12-end	302	British Library, Add MS 28815	London	United Kingdom	INTF
699	11th	Ephesians-Hebrews, Revelation	67	British Library, Egerton MS 3145	London	United Kingdom	BL
699	11th	Ephesians-Hebrews, Revelation	67	British Library, Egerton MS 3145	London	United Kingdom	INTF
700	11th	Gospels	297	British Library, Egerton MS 2610	London	United Kingdom	BL
700	11th	Gospels	297	British Library, Egerton MS 2610	London	United Kingdom	INTF, CSNTM

[top]

== Minuscules 701-800 ==
#	Date	Contents	Pages	Institution and refs.	City, State	Country	Images
701	14th	Gospels	170	Owner unknown			
702	12th	Gospels†	143	John Rylands University Library, Gr. Ms. 16	Manchester	UK	INTF
703	11th	Gospels	409	The Huntington Library, HM 1081	San Marino, CA	USA	INTF, CSNTM
703	11th	Gospels	409	The Huntington Library, HM 1081	San Marino, CA	USA	THL
[704] = 2284							
705	13th	Luke, John	254	Dumbarton Oaks, Ms. 4, acc. no. 74.1	Washington, D.C.	USA	HL
706	13th	Gospels	213	Bodleian Library, MS. Auct. T. 5. 34	Oxford	UK	INTF
706	13th	Gospels	213	Bodleian Library, MS. Auct. T. 5. 34	Oxford	UK	BL
707	11th	Gospels	150	Bodleian Library, MS. Auct. T. inf. 2. 6	Oxford	UK	INTF
707	11th	Gospels	150	Bodleian Library, MS. Auct. T. inf. 2. 6	Oxford	UK	BL
708	11th	Gospels†	200	Bodleian Library, MS. Auct. T. inf. 1. 3	Oxford	UK	INTF
709	11th	Gospels†	140	Bodleian Library, MS. Auct. T. inf. 1. 4	Oxford	UK	INTF
709	11th	Gospels†	140	Bodleian Library, MS. Auct. T. inf. 1. 4	Oxford	UK	BL
710	13th	Gospels†	183	Bodleian Library, MS. Auct. T. inf. 1. 5	Oxford	UK	INTF
711	11th	Gospels†	236	Bodleian Library, Oriel College Ms. 83	Oxford	UK	INTF
712 + [2164]	11th	Gospels, Acts, Pauline Epistles, General Epistles	240	University of California, Dep. of Special Collections, 170/347	Los Angeles, CA	USA	UCLA
712 + [2164]	11th	Gospels, Acts, Pauline Epistles, General Epistles	5	Russian National Library, Gr. 320 (Jude 12-25)	Saint Petersburg	Russia	INTF
713	12th	Gospels†	363	University of Birmingham Cadbury Research Library, Peckover, Gr. 7	Birmingham	UK	UoB INTF
714	13th	Gospels†	338	British Library, Egerton MS 2783	London	UK	BL
714	13th	Gospels†	338	British Library, Egerton MS 2783	London	UK	INTF
715	13th	Gospels	176	British Library, Egerton MS 2785	London	UK	BL
716	14th	Gospels	213	British Library, Egerton MS 2784	London	UK	BL
716	14th	Gospels	213	British Library, Egerton MS 2784	London	UK	INTF
717	11th/12th	Gospels	277	Cheltenham Ladies' College, Dep. e 175	Cheltenham	UK	INTF
718	14th	Gospels†	254	Gonville and Caius College, Ms. 781/819	Cambridge	UK	INTF
719	1196	Theophylact Commentary on the Gospels	314	Austrian National Library, Theol. gr. 19, fol. 1-314	Vienna	Austria	INTF, CSNTM
720	1138-9	Theophylact Commentary on Gospels, Pauline Epistles, General Epistles	296	Austrian National Library, Theol. gr. 79, 80,	Vienna	Austria	INTF, CSNTM
721	12th	Theophylact Commentary on Mark, Luke	502	Austrian National Library, Theol. gr. 90	Vienna	Austria	INTF, CSNTM
722	15th	Theophylact Commentary on Matthew, Mark, Luke	140	Austrian National Library, Theol. gr. 95, fol. 135-274	Vienna	Austria	INTF, CSNTM
723	15th	Theophylact Commentary on the Gospels	397	Austrian National Library, Theol. gr. 122	Vienna	Austria	INTF, CSNTM
724	1520	Gospels	203	Austrian National Library, Suppl. gr. 175	Vienna	Austria	INTF, CSNTM
725	13th	Gospels	210	Royal Library of Belgium, 11358	Brussels	Belgium	INTF
726	13th	Gospels	250	Royal Library of Belgium, 11375	Brussels	Belgium	INTF, CSNTM
727	14th	Theophylact Commentary on the Gospels†	246	National Library, Grec 179	Paris	France	BnF, CSNTM
728	14th	Theophylact Commentary on the Gospels	231	National Library, Grec 181	Paris	France	BnF, INTF, CSNTM
729	13th	Theophylact Commentary on the Gospels	341	National Library, Grec 182, fol. 1-341 (fol. 342 ℓ 61)	Paris	France	BnF, INTF, CSNTM
730	14th	Zigabenus Commentary on the Gospels†	331	National Library, Grec 183	Paris	France	BnF, INTF, CSNTM
731	14th	Theophylact Commentary on the Gospels	426	National Library, Grec 184	Paris	France	BnF, INTF, CSNTM
732	13th	Theophylact Commentary on the Gospels	271	National Library, Grec 185	Paris	France	BnF, INTF, CSNTM
733	12th	Theophylact Commentary on the Gospels	347	National Library, Grec 190	Paris	France	INTF
734	14th	Theophylact Commentary on Matthew, Luke, John	297	National Library, Grec 192	Paris	France	BnF, CSNTM
735	15th	Theophylact Commentary on Matthew†, Luke^{S}†	164	National Library, Grec 196	Paris	France	BnF, INTF, CSNTM
736	12th	Theophylact Commentary on Matthew, John	235	National Library, Grec 198	Paris	France	BnF
737	13th	Theophylact Commentary on Matthew	176	National Library, Grec 204	Paris	France	BnF, CSNTM
738	1327	Theophylact Commentary on Matthew	81	National Library, Grec 205	Paris	France	BnF, INTF, CSNTM
739	15th	Theophylact Commentary on Luke†	48	National Library, Grec 207	Paris	France	INTF
740	1318	Theophylact Commentary on the Gospels	444	National Library, Grec 234	Paris	France	BnF, INTF
741	14th	Theophylact Commentary on the Gospels	362	National Library, Grec 235	Paris	France	BnF
742	15th	Theophylact Commentary on John	160	National Library, Grec 1775	Paris	France	BnF
743	14th	Nicetas Catena and John, 1-3 John (no commentary), Revelation	401	National Library, Supplement Grec 159, fol. 2-7.12-406	Paris	France	BnF, INTF
744	13th	Theophylact Commentary on the Gospels†	367	National Library, Supplement Grec 219	Paris	France	BnF, INTF
745	16th	Gospels	212	National Library, Supplement Grec 227	Paris	France	INTF
746	11th	Gospels	396	National Library, Supplement Grec 611	Paris	France	BnF
747	1164	Gospels	376	National Library, Supplement Grec 612	Paris	France	BnF
748	12th	Gospels†	278	National Library, Supplement Grec 903	Paris	France	BnF
749	13th	Theophylact Commentary on the Gospels†	199	National Library, Supplement Grec 904	Paris	France	BnF
750	12th	Gospels	319	National Library, Supplement Grec 914	Paris	France	BnF
750	12th	Gospels	319	National Library, Supplement Grec 914	Paris	France	INTF
751	13th	Matthew 2:13-9:17†	19	National Library, Supplement Grec 919	Paris	France	BnF, INTF
752	12th	Gospels	199	National Library, Supplement Grec 927	Paris	France	INTF
753	11th	Matthew 23:11-21†	1	National Library, Supplement Grec 1035, 8, fol. 12	Paris	France	INTF
754	11th	Gospels	464	National Library, Supplement Grec 1076	Paris	France	BnF
755	16th	Gospels	332	National Library, Supplement Grec 1080	Paris	France	BnF
756	11th	Gospels†	179	National Library, Supplement Grec 1083	Paris	France	BnF
757	13th	New Testament†	414	National Library, 150	Athens	Greece	CSNTM
757	13th	New Testament†	414	National Library, 150	Athens	Greece	INTF
758	14th	Gospels	302	National Library, 151	Athens	Greece	CSNTM
759	13th	Gospels	298	National Library, 152	Athens	Greece	CSNTM
760	12th	Gospels	284	National Library, 153	Athens	Greece	CSNTM
760	12th	Gospels	1	National Library, 153	Athens	Greece	CSNTM
761	14th	Gospels	281	National Library, 154	Athens	Greece	CSNTM
762	14th	Gospels	332	National Library, 155	Athens	Greece	CSNTM
763	14th	Gospels	324	National Library, 156	Athens	Greece	CSNTM
764	14th	Gospels†	332	National Library, 157	Athens	Greece	CSNTM
765	12th	Gospels	200	National Library, 158	Athens	Greece	CSNTM
765	12th	Gospels	200	National Library, 158	Athens	Greece	INTF
766	13th	Gospels	316	National Library, 159	Athens	Greece	CSNTM
[767] = 1281							
768	12th	Gospels†	222	National Library, 161	Athens	Greece	CSNTM
769	14th	Gospels	253	National Library, 161	Athens	Greece	CSNTM
770	12th	Matthew†, John	270	National Library, 203	Athens	Greece	CSNTM
771	10th	Gospels†	153	National Library, 204	Athens	Greece	CSNTM
771	10th	Gospels†	153	National Library, 204	Athens	Greece	CSNTM (25)
771	10th	Gospels†	153	National Library, 204	Athens	Greece	INTF
772	14th	Theophylact Commentary on the Gospels†	390	National Library, 489	Athens	Greece	CSNTM
772	14th	Theophylact Commentary on the Gospels†	390	National Library, 489	Athens	Greece	INTF
773	10th	Gospels	285	National Library, 56	Athens	Greece	CSNTM
773	10th	Gospels	285	National Library, 56	Athens	Greece	INTF
774	11th	Gospels	370	National Library, 57	Athens	Greece	CSNTM
774	11th	Gospels	370	National Library, 57	Athens	Greece	INTF
775	13th	Gospels	223	National Library, 58	Athens	Greece	CSNTM
776	11th	Gospels	387	National Library, 76	Athens	Greece	CSNTM
776	11th	Gospels	387	National Library, 76	Athens	Greece	INTF
777	12th	Gospels	185	National Library, 93	Athens	Greece	CSNTM
778	12th	Gospels	195	National Library, 80	Athens	Greece	CSNTM
778	12th	Gospels	195	National Library, 80	Athens	Greece	INTF
779	12th	Gospels	171	National Library, 127	Athens	Greece	CSNTM
780	11th	Gospels	241	National Library, 121	Athens	Greece	CSNTM
780	11th	Gospels	241	National Library, 121	Athens	Greece	INTF
781	14th	Gospels†	199	National Library, 110	Athens	Greece	CSNTM
782	12th	Gospels	277	National Library, 81	Athens	Greece	CSNTM
782	12th	Gospels	277	National Library, 81	Athens	Greece	CSNTM (1)
782	12th	Gospels	277	National Library, 81	Athens	Greece	INTF
783	14th	Gospels	212	National Library, 71	Athens	Greece	CSNTM
783	14th	Gospels	212	National Library, 71	Athens	Greece	INTF
784	14th	Gospels†	161	National Library, 87	Athens	Greece	CSNTM
785	11th	Gospels	231	National Library, 118	Athens	Greece	CSNTM
785	11th	Gospels	231	National Library, 118	Athens	Greece	CSNTM (1)
785	11th	Gospels	231	National Library, 118	Athens	Greece	INTF
786	14th	Gospels	293	National Library, 125	Athens	Greece	CSNTM
787	12th	Gospels	305	National Library, 108	Athens	Greece	CSNTM
787	12th	Gospels	305	National Library, 108	Athens	Greece	INTF
788	11th	Gospels	219	National Library, 74	Athens	Greece	CSNTM
788	11th	Gospels	219	National Library, 74	Athens	Greece	INTF
789	14th	Gospels†	250	National Library, 134	Athens	Greece	CSNTM
790	14th	Gospels†	240	National Library, 86	Athens	Greece	CSNTM
791	12th	Gospels	229	National Library, 77	Athens	Greece	CSNTM
791	12th	Gospels	229	National Library, 77	Athens	Greece	INTF
792	13th	Gospels, Revelation	145	National Library, 107	Athens	Greece	CSNTM
792	13th	Gospels, Revelation	145	National Library, 107	Athens	Greece	INTF
793	12th	Gospels	252	National Library, 75	Athens	Greece	CSNTM
793	12th	Gospels	252	National Library, 75	Athens	Greece	INTF
794	14th	Gospels, Acts, Pauline Epistles†, General Epistles	256	National Library, 122	Athens	Greece	CSNTM
794	14th	Gospels, Acts, Pauline Epistles†, General Epistles	256	National Library, 122	Athens	Greece	INTF
795	14th	Gospels	325	National Library, 109	Athens	Greece	CSNTM
796	11th	Gospels, Acts, Pauline Epistles, General Epistles†	318	National Library, 160	Athens	Greece	CSNTM
796	11th	Gospels, Acts, Pauline Epistles, General Epistles†	318	National Library, 160	Athens	Greece	INTF
797	14th	Gospels	224	National Library, 111	Athens	Greece	CSNTM
798 + [2447]	11th	Gospels†	116	National Library, 137	Athens	Greece	CSNTM
798 + [2447]	11th	Gospels†	148	INTF, Ms. 7	Münster	Germany	CSNTM, INTF
799	11th	Gospels	367	National Library, 117	Athens	Greece	CSNTM
799	11th	Gospels	367	National Library, 117	Athens	Greece	INTF
800	12th	Gospels†	217	National Library, 65	Athens	Greece	CSNTM

[top]

== Minuscules 801-900 ==
#	Date	Contents	Pages	Institution and refs.	City, State	Country	Images
801	14th	Gospels, Acts, Pauline Epistles, General Epistles	324	National Library, 130	Athens	Greece	CSNTM
801	14th	Gospels, Acts, Pauline Epistles, General Epistles	324	National Library, 130	Athens	Greece	INTF
802	14th	Luke 1:1-6:13†	24	National Library, 99	Athens	Greece	CSNTM
803	16th	Matthew, Mark, Luke	215	National Library, 88	Athens	Greece	CSNTM
803	16th	Matthew, Mark, Luke	215	National Library, 88	Athens	Greece	INTF
804	11th	Gospels†	261	Hellenic Parliament Library, HPL 2	Athens	Greece	CSNTM
804	11th	Gospels†	261	Hellenic Parliament Library, HPL 2	Athens	Greece	INTF
805	13th	Matthew, Mark, and Luke†	244	Hellenic Parliament Library, HPL 351	Athens	Greece	CSNTM
806	14th	Gospels	368	Hellenic Parliament Library, HPL 3	Athens	Greece	CSNTM
807 + [1368]	12th	Gospels†	281	Hellenic Parliament Library, HPL 1	Athens	Greece	CSNTM
807 + [1368]	12th	Gospels†	281	Hellenic Parliament Library, HPL 1	Athens	Greece	INTF
808	14th	New Testament	414	National Library, 2251	Athens	Greece	CSNTM
809	11th	Gospels	284	National Library, 2364	Athens	Greece	CSNTM
809	11th	Gospels	284	National Library, 2364	Athens	Greece	INTF
810							
811	13th	Gospels	289	National Library, 2814	Athens	Greece	CSNTM
[812] + 2278							
813	12th	Matthew†, Mark†, Luke†	70	Owner unknown			
814	13th	Commentary on the Gospels		Owner unknown			
[815] + 2276							
[816] + 2277							
817	15th	Theophylact Commentary on the Gospels	255	Basel University Library, A. III. 15	Basel	Switzerland	INTF
818	14th	Theophylact Commentary on the Gospels	373	Royal Site of San Lorenzo de El Escorial, Ψ. ΙΙΙ. 13	San Lorenzo de El Escorial	Spain	INTF
819	14th	Theophylact Commentary on Matthew, John	361	Royal Site of San Lorenzo de El Escorial, Ψ. ΙΙΙ. 14	San Lorenzo de El Escorial	Spain	INTF
820	1292	Theophylact Commentary on the Gospels	410	Royal Site of San Lorenzo de El Escorial, Ω. Ι. 16	San Lorenzo de El Escorial	Spain	INTF
821	16th	John	281	National Library, 4673, fol. 262-542	Madrid	Spain	INTF
822	12th	Matthew† (Nicetas Catena)	281	National Library, 4739	Madrid	Spain	INTF
823	13th	Gospels^{S}†, Acts, Pauline Epistles, General Epistles	251	Jagiellonian Library, Graec. Oct. 13	Kraków	Poland	INTF
824	12th	New Testament	366	Exarchist Monastery of Saint Mary, A. a. 1	Grottaferrata	Italy	INTF
825	12th	Gospels	337	Exarchist Monastery of Saint Mary, A. a. 2	Grottaferrata	Italy	INTF, CSNTM
826	12th	Gospels	233	Exarchist Monastery of Saint Mary, A. a. 3	Grottaferrata	Italy	INTF, CSNTM
827	13th	Gospels†	225	Exarchist Monastery of Saint Mary, A. a. 4	Grottaferrata	Italy	INTF
828	12th	Gospels	176	Exarchist Monastery of Saint Mary, A. a. 5	Grottaferrata	Italy	CSNTM, INTF
829	12th	Gospels†	222	Exarchist Monastery of Saint Mary, A. a. 6	Grottaferrata	Italy	INTF
830	13th	Gospels†	122	Exarchist Monastery of Saint Mary, A. a. 8	Grottaferrata	Italy	INTF, CSNTM
831	11th	Luke 19:25-John 21:25	69	Exarchist Monastery of Saint Mary, A. a. 17	Grottaferrata	Italy	INTF
832	10th	Matthew (abridged), John (abridged), General Epistles	251	Laurentian Library, Plut.06.05	Florence	Italy	BML, INTF
833	14th	Theophylact Commentary on the Gospels	359	Laurentian Library, Plut.06.26	Florence	Italy	BML, INTF
834	14th	Theophylact Commentary on the Gospels	287	Laurentian Library, Plut.11.06	Florence	Italy	BML, INTF
835	1284	Theophylact Commentary on the Gospels	207	Laurentian Library, Plut.11.08	Florence	Italy	BML, INTF
836	14th	Theophylact Commentary on Matthew, Mark, John	277	Laurentian Library, Plut.11.18	Florence	Italy	BML, INTF
837 = [2580]	14th	Matthew†, Mark†	29	Ambrosiana Library, I 94 suss., fol. 38-66	Milan	Italy	INTF
[838] = 657							
839	14th	Gospels	246	University Library, 88	Messina	Italy	INTF
840	13th	Theophylact Commentary on Luke†	125	University Library, 100	Messina	Italy	INTF
841	15th	Theophylact Commentary on Mark, Luke, John	244	Estense Library, G. 178, a.V.7.24 (II F 13)	Modena	Italy	INTF
842	14th	Theophylact Commentary on Matthew†	88	Estense Library, G. 128, a.W.9.26 (III D 9)	Modena	Italy	INTF
843	12th	Gospels†	235	Victor Emmanuel III National Library, Ms. II. A. 37	Naples	Italy	INTF
844	15th	Gospels†	232	University of Padua, Libr., ms. 695	Padua	Italy	INTF
845	1330	Gospels	315	Fabroniana Library, 307	Pistoia	Italy	INTF
846	14th	Gospel of Luke 6:32-12:17 (Nicetas Catena)	343	Angelica Library, Ang. Gr. 100	Rome	Italy	IC
846	14th	Gospel of Luke 6:32-12:17 (Nicetas Catena)	343	Angelica Library, Ang. Gr. 100	Rome	Italy	INTF
847	12th	Matthew†, Mark†	280	Angelica Library, Ang. gr. 36	Rome	Italy	IC
848	14th	Theophylact Commentary on Luke	442	Angelica Library, Ang. gr. 21	Rome	Italy	IC
848	14th	Theophylact Commentary on Luke	442	Angelica Library, Ang. gr. 21	Rome	Italy	INTF
849	17th	Cyril Commentary on John 7:25-10:18	152	Vatican Library, Barb.gr.495	Vatican City	Vatican	DVL
850	12th	Cyril Commentary on John 1:1-10:17	381	Vatican Library, Barb.gr.504	Vatican City	Vatican	DVL
850	12th	Cyril Commentary on John 1:1-10:17	381	Vatican Library, Barb.gr.504	Vatican City	Vatican	INTF
851 = [2602]	12th & 14th	Gospels	260	Owner Anonymous	Athens	Greece	INTF
852	ca. 1300	Gospels†	165	Vatican Library, Borg.gr.9	Vatican City	Vatican	INTF
853	15th	Luke 6:29-12:10 (Nicetas Catena)	320	Casanata Library, 715	Rome	Italy	INTF
854	1286	Theophylact Commentary on the Gospels	467	Vatican Library, Vat.gr.641	Vatican City	Vatican	INTF
855	12th	Theophylact Commentary on the Gospels	584	Vatican Library, Vat.gr.643	Vatican City	Vatican	INTF
856	1279-80	Theophylact Commentary on the Gospels	349	Vatican Library, Vat.gr.644	Vatican City	Vatican	INTF
857	12th	Theophylact Commentary on the Luke, John	391	Vatican Library, Vat.gr.645	Vatican City	Vatican	INTF
858	14th	Theophylact Commentary on the Gospels	338	Vatican Library, Vat.gr.647	Vatican City	Vatican	INTF
859	16th	Luke (Nicetas Catena)	261	Vatican Library, Vat.gr.759	Vatican City	Vatican	INTF
860	12th/13th	Matthew, Mark, Luke	144	Vatican Library, Vat.gr.774, fol. 17-160 (fol. 1-16; ℓ 2354)	Vatican City	Vatican	INTF
861	16th	Gospels	510	Vatican Library, Vat.gr.1090	Vatican City	Vatican	INTF
862	12th	Theophylact Commentary on John	402	Vatican Library, Vat.gr.1191	Vatican City	Vatican	INTF
863	1154	Theophylact Commentary on the Gospels†	400	Vatican Library, Vat.gr.1221	Vatican City	Vatican	DVL, INTF
864	14th	Gospels	550	Vatican Library, Vat.gr.1253	Vatican City	Vatican	INTF
865	15th	John	123	Vatican Library, Vat.gr.1472	Vatican City	Vatican	INTF
866	12th	Matthew 7:24-10:40	7	Vatican Library, Vat.gr.1882, fol. 10-16	Vatican City	Vatican	DVL
866	12th	Matthew 7:24-10:40	7	Vatican Library, Vat.gr.1882, fol. 10-16	Vatican City	Vatican	INTF
867	14th	Gospels†	223	Vatican Library, Vat.gr.1895	Vatican City	Vatican	DVL, INTF
868	17th	Luke†	624	Vatican Library, Vat.gr.1933	Vatican City	Vatican	INTF
869	12th	John 6:20-11:57 (Nicetas Catena)	245	Vatican Library, Vat.gr.1996	Vatican City	Vatican	DVL, INTF
870	11th	Luke 11:5-16:14	14	Vatican Library, Vat.gr.2115, fol. 166-179	Vatican City	Vatican	DVL, INTF
871	13th	Gospels†	164	Vatican Library, Vat.gr.2117	Vatican City	Vatican	INTF
872	12th	Gospels†	180	Vatican Library, Vat.gr.2160	Vatican City	Vatican	INTF
873	11th	Gospels	289	Vatican Library, Vat.gr.2165	Vatican City	Vatican	INTF
874	13th	Theophylact Commentary on John	383	Vatican Library, Vat.gr.2187	Vatican City	Vatican	INTF
875	10th	Gospels	288	Vatican Library, Vat.gr.2247	Vatican City	Vatican	INTF
876	12th	Acts, Pauline Epistles, General Epistles	282	University of Michigan, Ms. 16	Ann Arbor, MI	USA	CSNTM
876	12th	Acts, Pauline Epistles, General Epistles	282	University of Michigan, Ms. 16	Ann Arbor, MI	USA	INTF
877	1197	Gospels	218	Vatican Library, Vat.gr.2290	Vatican City	Vatican	DVL
877	1197	Gospels	218	Vatican Library, Vat.gr.2290	Vatican City	Vatican	INTF
878	12th	Theophylact Commentary on the Gospels	248	Vatican Library, Ott.gr.37	Vatican City	Vatican	DVL
878	12th	Theophylact Commentary on the Gospels	248	Vatican Library, Ott.gr.37	Vatican City	Vatican	INTF
879	16th	Luke 6:29-12:10 (Nicetas Catena)	105	Vatican Library, Ott.gr.100	Vatican City	Vatican	DVL
879	16th	Luke 6:29-12:10 (Nicetas Catena)	105	Vatican Library, Ott.gr.100	Vatican City	Vatican	INTF
880	15th	Gospels	355	Vatican Library, Ott.gr.208	Vatican City	Vatican	DVL
880	15th	Gospels	355	Vatican Library, Ott.gr.208	Vatican City	Vatican	INTF
881	15th	Theophylact Commentary on the Gospels	523	Vatican Library, Ott.gr.453-455	Vatican City	Vatican	INTF
882	10th	Chrysostom Homilies on John	181	Vatican Library, Pal.gr.32	Vatican City	Vatican	HU
883	15th	Theophylact Commentary on John	247	Vatican Library, Pal.gr.208	Vatican City	Vatican	HU
884	11th	Luke, John	256	Vatican Library, Reg.gr.3	Vatican City	Vatican	INTF
885	15th	Gospels (Gospel of John abridged)	486	Vatican Library, Reg.gr.5	Vatican City	Vatican	INTF
886	1454	Theophylact Commentary on the Gospels, Acts, Pauline Epistles, Revelation†	336	Vatican Library, Reg.gr.6	Vatican City	Vatican	INTF
887	11th	John	197	Vatican Library, Reg.gr.9	Vatican City	Vatican	INTF
888	14th	Theophylact Commentary on the Gospels	307	Marciana National Library, Gr. Z. 26 (340)	Venice	Italy	INTF
889	14th	Theophylact Commentary on the Gospels	224	Marciana National Library, Gr. Z. 30 (342)	Venice	Italy	INTF
890	14th	Theophylact Commentary on the Gospels	397	Marciana National Library, Gr. Z. 31 (321)	Venice	Italy	INTF
891	14th	Theophylact Commentary on the Gospels, Pauline Epistles†	474	Marciana National Library, Gr. Z. 32 (689)	Venice	Italy	INTF
892	9th	Gospels†	353	British Library, Add MS 33277	London	UK	BL
892	9th	Gospels†	353	British Library, Add MS 33277	London	UK	INTF
893	12th	Matthew 1:4–9:8 (Nicetas Catena)	484	Marciana National Library, Gr. I,61	Venice	Italy	INTF
894	11th	Mark 10:25-35, 14:62–15:46	1	The Schøyen Collection, MS 583/2	Oslo	Norway	INTF
894	11th	Mark 10:25-35, 14:62–15:46	4	Marciana National Library, Gr. II,144 (1362)	Venice	Italy	INTF
895 = [2366]	13th	Gospels	239	Princeton University Library, Garrett MS. 7	Princeton	USA	CSNTM
896	12th	Gospels	275	Cambridge University Library, Add. Mss. 6677	Cambridge	UK	INTF
897	13th	Gospels†	327	Edinburgh University Library, Ms. 220 (D Laing 6)	Edinburgh	UK	CSNTM
897	13th	Gospels†	327	Edinburgh University Library, Ms. 220 (D Laing 6)	Edinburgh	UK	INTF
898	13th	Gospels†	18	Historical Museum of Crete, s.n.	Heraklion, Crete	Greece	INTF
898	13th	Gospels†	79	Edinburgh University Library, Ms. 221 (D Laing 667)	Edinburgh	UK	CSNTM
899	11th	Gospels†	208	Uppsala University, Gr. 4	Uppsala	Sweden	UU
899	11th	Gospels†	208	Uppsala University, Gr. 4	Uppsala	Sweden	INTF
900	13th	Gospels	288	Uppsala University, Gr. 9	Uppsala	Sweden	UU

[top]

== Minuscules 901-1000 ==
#	Date	Contents	Pages	Institution and refs.	City, State	Country	Images
901	11th	Gospels, Acts, Pauline Epistles, General Epistles	328	Uppsala University, Gr. 12	Uppsala	Sweden	UU
901	11th	Gospels, Acts, Pauline Epistles, General Epistles	328	Uppsala University, Gr. 12	Uppsala	Sweden	INTF
902	12th	Gospels	230	Uppsala University, Gr. 13	Uppsala	Sweden	UU
902	12th	Gospels	230	Uppsala University, Gr. 13	Uppsala	Sweden	INTF
903 + [2168]	1381	Gospels	232	Greek Orthodox Patriarchate, 451 (119)	Alexandria	Egypt	INTF
903 + [2168]	1381	Gospels	1	National Library of Russia, Gr. 398, (John 1:1-15)	Saint Petersburg	Russia	INTF
904	1360	Gospels	376	Greek Orthodox Patriarchate, 77	Alexandria	Egypt	INTF
905	12th/13th	New Testament	499	Princeton University Library, Garrett MS. 5	Princeton, NJ	United States	INTF
905	12th/13th	New Testament	499	Ivan Dujcev Center for Slavo-Byzantine Studies, D. gr. 369	Sofia	Bulgaria	INTF
905	12th/13th	New Testament	499	Morgan Library & Museum, MS M. 714	New York, NY	United States	INTF
906	12th	Gospels	164	Princeton University Library, Garrett MS. 6	Princeton, NJ	United States	INTF
907	14th	Gospels	194	Skete of Saint Andrew, 27 (destroyed)	Mount Athos	Greece	
908	13th	Gospels	312	Skete of Saint Andrew, 4 (destroyed)	Mount Athos	Greece	
909	1108	Acts, Pauline Epistles, General Epistles	271	The Van Kampen Foundation, VK 902	(Unknown)	United States	CSNTM, INTF
910	1009	Acts, Pauline Epistles, General Epistles	265	British Library, Add MS 39598	London	United Kingdom	BL
910	1009	Acts, Pauline Epistles, General Epistles	265	British Library, Add MS 39598	London	United Kingdom	INTF
911 + [2040]	12th	Acts, Pauline Epistles, James - 2 Peter	318	British Library, Add MS 39599, 318 fol.	London	United Kingdom	BL
911 + [2040]	12th	Acts, Pauline Epistles, James - 2 Peter	318	British Library, Add MS 39599, 318 fol.	London	United Kingdom	INTF
911 + [2040]	12th	Revelation	16	British Library, Add MS 39601, 16 fol.	London	United Kingdom	BL
911 + [2040]	12th	Revelation	16	British Library, Add MS 39601, 16 fol.	London	United Kingdom	INTF
912	13th	Acts, Pauline Epistles, General Epistles	206	British Library, Add MS 39600	London	United Kingdom	BL
912	13th	Acts, Pauline Epistles, General Epistles	206	British Library, Add MS 39600	London	United Kingdom	INTF
913	14th	Acts, Pauline Epistles, General Epistles †	244	British Library, Egerton MS 2787	London	United Kingdom	BL
913	14th	Acts, Pauline Epistles, General Epistles †	244	British Library, Egerton MS 2787	London	United Kingdom	INTF
914	13th	Acts†, Pauline Epistles†, General Epistles†	344	Royal Site of San Lorenzo de El Escorial, R. III. 4	San Lorenzo de El Escorial	Spain	INTF
915	13th	Acts†, Pauline Epistles†, General Epistles†	237	Royal Site of San Lorenzo de El Escorial, T. III. 12	San Lorenzo de El Escorial	Spain	INTF
916	12th	Acts†	32	Royal Site of San Lorenzo de El Escorial, X. III. 3	San Lorenzo de El Escorial	Spain	INTF
917	12th	Acts, Pauline Epistles, General Epistles	137	Royal Site of San Lorenzo de El Escorial, III. 10	San Lorenzo de El Escorial	Spain	INTF
918	16th	Pauline Epistles†, General Epistles†	397	Royal Site of San Lorenzo de El Escorial, Σ. I. 5	San Lorenzo de El Escorial	Spain	INTF
919	11th	Acts†, Pauline Epistles†, General Epistles†, Revelation†	265	Royal Site of San Lorenzo de El Escorial, Ψ. III. 6	San Lorenzo de El Escorial	Spain	INTF
920	10th	Acts, Pauline Epistles, General Epistles, Revelation (no commentary)	239	Royal Site of San Lorenzo de El Escorial, Ψ. III. 18	San Lorenzo de El Escorial	Spain	INTF
921	1332	Acts, Pauline Epistles, General Epistles	334	Royal Site of San Lorenzo de El Escorial, X. IV. 9	San Lorenzo de El Escorial	Spain	INTF
922	1116	New Testament	405	Osiou Gregoriou Monastery, 3	Mount Athos	Greece	INTF
923	13th	Gospels	204	Osiou Gregoriou Monastery, 156	Mount Athos	Greece	MAR
924	13th	Gospels	356	Dionysiou Monastery, 45	Mount Athos	Greece	Elpenor
925 + [2156]	14th	Gospels	412	Dionysiou Monastery, 5	Mount Athos	Greece	INTF
925 + [2156]	14th	Gospels	1	National Library of Russia, Gr. 302 (Mt 10:27-36)	Saint Petersburg	Russia	INTF
926	13th	Gospels	161	Dionysiou Monastery, 52	Mount Athos	Greece	INTF
927 + [2618]	1133	Gospels, Acts, Pauline Epistles, General Epistles	280	Dionysiou Monastery, 54	Mount Athos	Greece	INTF, CSNTM
928 + [2165]	1304	Gospels, Acts, Pauline Epistles, General Epistles	331	Dionysiou Monastery, 56	Mount Athos	Greece	INTF, CSNTM
928 + [2165]	1304	Gospels, Acts, Pauline Epistles, General Epistles	2	National Library of Russia, Gr. 322 (Ph 3:13-4:23; Col 1:1-6)	Saint Petersburg	Russia	INTF
929	13th	Gospels	214	Dionysiou Monastery, 62	Mount Athos	Greece	INTF
930	12th	Gospels†	227	Dionysiou Monastery, 134	Mount Athos	Greece	INTF
931	13th	Gospels	217	Dionysiou Monastery, 133, fol. 3-219 (fol. 1.2, 200.221: ℓ1320)	Mount Athos	Greece	INTF
932	14th	Gospels	240	Dionysiou Monastery, 137	Mount Athos	Greece	INTF
933	12th	Gospels†	292	Dionysiou Monastery, 138	Mount Athos	Greece	INTF
934	14th	Gospels	260	Dionysiou Monastery, 139	Mount Athos	Greece	INTF
935	14th	New Testament	410	Dionysiou Monastery, 141	Mount Athos	Greece	INTF
936	12th	Matthew 7:13-28:20, Mark 1:14-10:10	69	Dionysiou Monastery, 157	Mount Athos	Greece	INTF
937	11th	Gospels	256	Dionysiou Monastery, 160	Mount Athos	Greece	INTF, CSNTM
938 + [2161]	1318	Gospels	271	Dionysiou Monastery, 159	Mount Athos	Greece	CSNTM
938 + [2161]	1318	Gospels	1	National Library of Russia, Gr. 315 (John 5:20-36)	Saint Petersburg	Russia	
939	12th	Gospels	238	Dionysiou Monastery, 161	Mount Athos	Greece	INTF
940	13th	Gospels†	176	Dionysiou Monastery, 162	Mount Athos	Greece	INTF
941	13th/14th	Gospels, Acts, Pauline Epistles, General Epistles	301	Dionysiou Monastery, 164	Mount Athos	Greece	INTF
942	10th	Gospels	383	Dionysiou Monastery, 121	Mount Athos	Greece	INTF, CSNTM
942	10th	Gospels	2	National Library of Russia, Gr. 286	Saint Petersburg	Russia	INTF
943	12th	Gospels	213	Dionysiou Monastery, 122	Mount Athos	Greece	INTF, CSNTM
944	12th	Gospels	331	Dionysiou Monastery, 123	Mount Athos	Greece	INTF, CSNTM
945	11th	Gospels, Acts, Pauline Epistles, General Epistles	347	Dionysiou Monastery, 124	Mount Athos	Greece	INTF, CSNTM
946	12th	Gospels	384	Dionysiou Monastery, 125	Mount Athos	Greece	INTF
946	12th	Gospels	384	Dionysiou Monastery, 125	Mount Athos	Greece	Elpenor
947	13th	Gospels†	298	Dionysiou Monastery, 129	Mount Athos	Greece	INTF
948	12th	Gospels	297	Dionysiou Monastery, 120	Mount Athos	Greece	INTF
949	13th	Theophylact Commentary on the Gospels	265	Dionysiou Monastery, 58	Mount Athos	Greece	INTF
950	12th	Mark 4:4-16:20; Luke 1:29-2:21	39	Dionysiou Monastery, 67	Mount Athos	Greece	INTF
951 + [2166]	1317	Gospels	374	Dionysiou Monastery, 88	Mount Athos	Greece	INTF, CSNTM
951 + [2166]	1317	Gospels	2	National Library of Russia, Gr. 326 (John 10:31-11:10)	Saint Petersburg	Russia	INTF
952	14th	Gospels	232	Dionysiou Monastery, 345	Mount Athos	Greece	INTF
953	14th	Gospels	262	Dionysiou Monastery, 346	Mount Athos	Greece	INTF
954	15th	Gospels	283	Dionysiou Monastery, 347	Mount Athos	Greece	INTF
955	15th	Gospels	364	Dionysiou Monastery, 247	Mount Athos	Greece	INTF
956	17th	Gospels, Acts, Pauline Epistles†	321	Dionysiou Monastery, 251	Mount Athos	Greece	INTF
957	16th	Gospels	297	Dionysiou Monastery, 256	Mount Athos	Greece	INTF
958	15th	Gospels	281	Dionysiou Monastery, 248	Mount Athos	Greece	INTF
959	1331	Gospels, Acts, Pauline Epistles, General Epistles	356	Dionysiou Monastery, 254	Mount Athos	Greece	INTF, CSNTM
960	14th	Gospels	362	Dionysiou Monastery, 249	Mount Athos	Greece	INTF
961	15th	Gospels	244	Dionysiou Monastery, 155, fol. 1-244 (fol. 245-319: ℓ1277)	Mount Athos	Greece	INTF
962	1498	Gospels†	190	Dionysiou Monastery, 257	Mount Athos	Greece	INTF, CSNTM
963	1636	Gospels	236	Dionysiou Monastery, 253	Mount Athos	Greece	INTF
964	11th	Gospels	164	Docheiariou Monastery, 7	Mount Athos	Greece	INTF
965	11th	Gospels	255	Docheiariou Monastery, 21	Mount Athos	Greece	INTF
966	13th	Gospels	325	Docheiariou Monastery, 22	Mount Athos	Greece	INTF
966	13th	Gospels	325	Docheiariou Monastery, 22	Mount Athos	Greece	Elpenor
967	12th	Luke† 7:6 — John† 11:16	106	Docheiariou Monastery, 30	Mount Athos	Greece	INTF
968	11th	Gospels	191	Docheiariou Monastery, 35	Mount Athos	Greece	INTF
969	13th	Gospels†	231	Docheiariou Monastery, 39	Mount Athos	Greece	INTF
970	13th	Theophylact Commentary on Matthew, Mark	206	Docheiariou Monastery, 42, fol. 1-206	Mount Athos	Greece	INTF
971	12th	Gospels	277	Docheiariou Monastery, 46	Mount Athos	Greece	INTF
972	11th	Gospels	317	Docheiariou Monastery, 49	Mount Athos	Greece	INTF
973	12th	Gospels	306	Docheiariou Monastery, 51	Mount Athos	Greece	INTF
974	12th	Gospels	238	Docheiariou Monastery, 52	Mount Athos	Greece	INTF
975	12th	Gospels	248	Docheiariou Monastery, 55	Mount Athos	Greece	INTF
976	12th	Gospels†	229	Docheiariou Monastery, 56	Mount Athos	Greece	INTF
977	14th	Luke†, John†	127	Docheiariou Monastery, 57	Mount Athos	Greece	INTF
978	14th	Gospels	428	Docheiariou Monastery, 76	Mount Athos	Greece	INTF
979	16th	Gospels	309	Docheiariou Monastery, 142	Mount Athos	Greece	MAR
980	12th	Gospels	273	Esphigmenou Monastery, 25	Mount Athos	Greece	INTF
981	13th	Gospels†	241	Esphigmenou Monastery, 26	Mount Athos	Greece	INTF
982	14th	Gospels	175	Esphigmenou Monastery, 27	Mount Athos	Greece	INTF
983	12th	Gospels†	208	Esphigmenou Monastery, 29	Mount Athos	Greece	INTF
984	14th	Gospels		Owner unknown, formerly: Esphigmenou Monastery, 30	Mount Athos	Greece	
985	12th	Gospels†	291	Esphigmenou Monastery, 31	Mount Athos	Greece	
986	14th	New Testament†	441	Esphigmenou Monastery, 186	Mount Athos	Greece	INTF
987	12th	Gospels†	176	Zograf Monastery, 4	Mount Athos	Greece	MAR
988	17th	Gospels	283	Zograf Monastery, 14	Mount Athos	Greece	MAR
989	12th	Gospels	264	Iviron Monastery, 2	Mount Athos	Greece	INTF, CSNTM
990	13th/14th	Gospels	460	Iviron Monastery, 5	Mount Athos	Greece	Elpenor
990	13th/14th	Gospels	460	Iviron Monastery, 5	Mount Athos	Greece	INTF
991	11th	Gospels†	214	Iviron Monastery, 7	Mount Athos	Greece	INTF, CSNTM
992	13th	Gospels	232	Iviron Monastery, 9	Mount Athos	Greece	INTF, CSNTM
993	12th	Theophylact Commentary on John†	98	Iviron Monastery, 18	Mount Athos	Greece	INTF, CSNTM
994	10th/11th	Matthew†, John†	246	Iviron Monastery, 19	Mount Athos	Greece	INTF, CSNTM
995	13th	Gospels	291	Iviron Monastery, 21	Mount Athos	Greece	INTF
996	14th	Gospels, Acts, Pauline Epistles, General Epistles	269	Iviron Monastery, 28	Mount Athos	Greece	INTF
997	13th	Gospels, Acts, Pauline Epistles, General Epistles	354	Iviron Monastery, 29	Mount Athos	Greece	INTF
998	12th	Gospels†	215	Iviron Monastery, 30	Mount Athos	Greece	INTF, CSNTM
999	13th	Gospels, Acts, Pauline Epistles, General Epistles	360	Iviron Monastery, 260	Mount Athos	Greece	INTF, CSNTM
1000	13th	Gospels†	280	Iviron Monastery, 32	Mount Athos	Greece	INTF

[top]

== Gallery ==
Some manuscripts

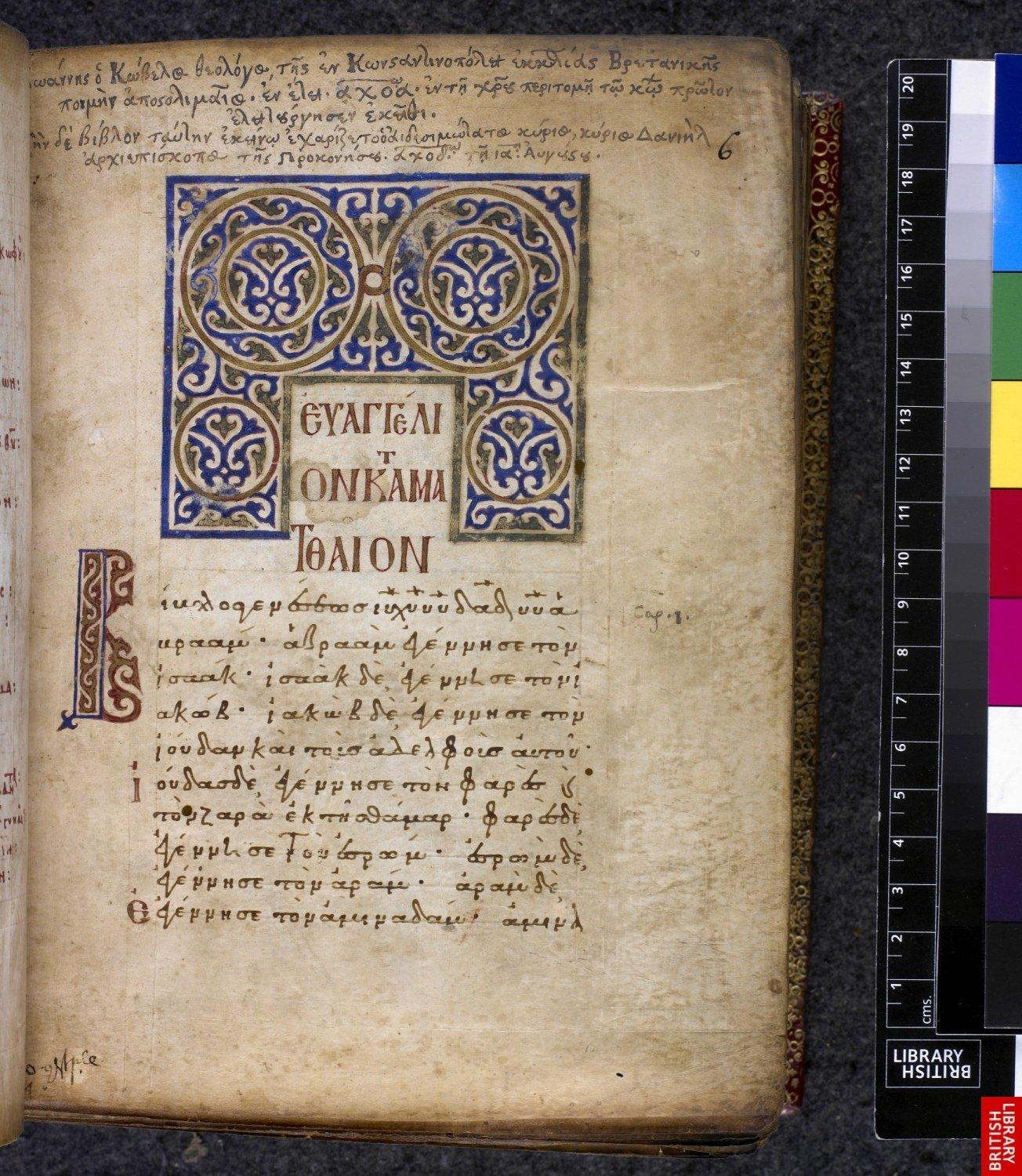
Minuscule 65

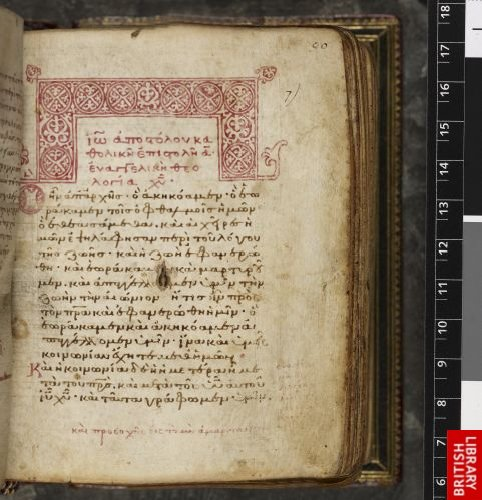
Minuscule 104

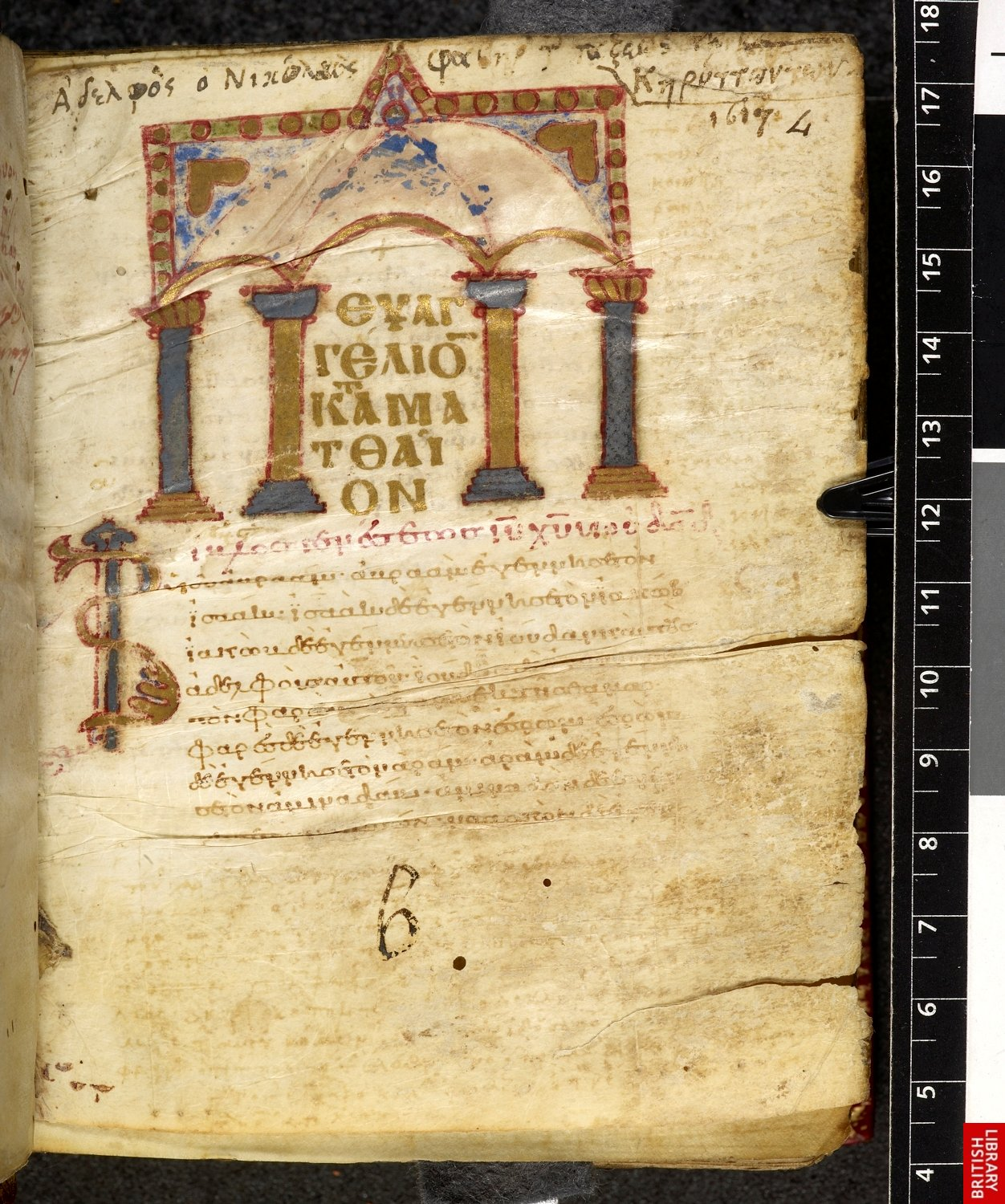
Minuscule 114

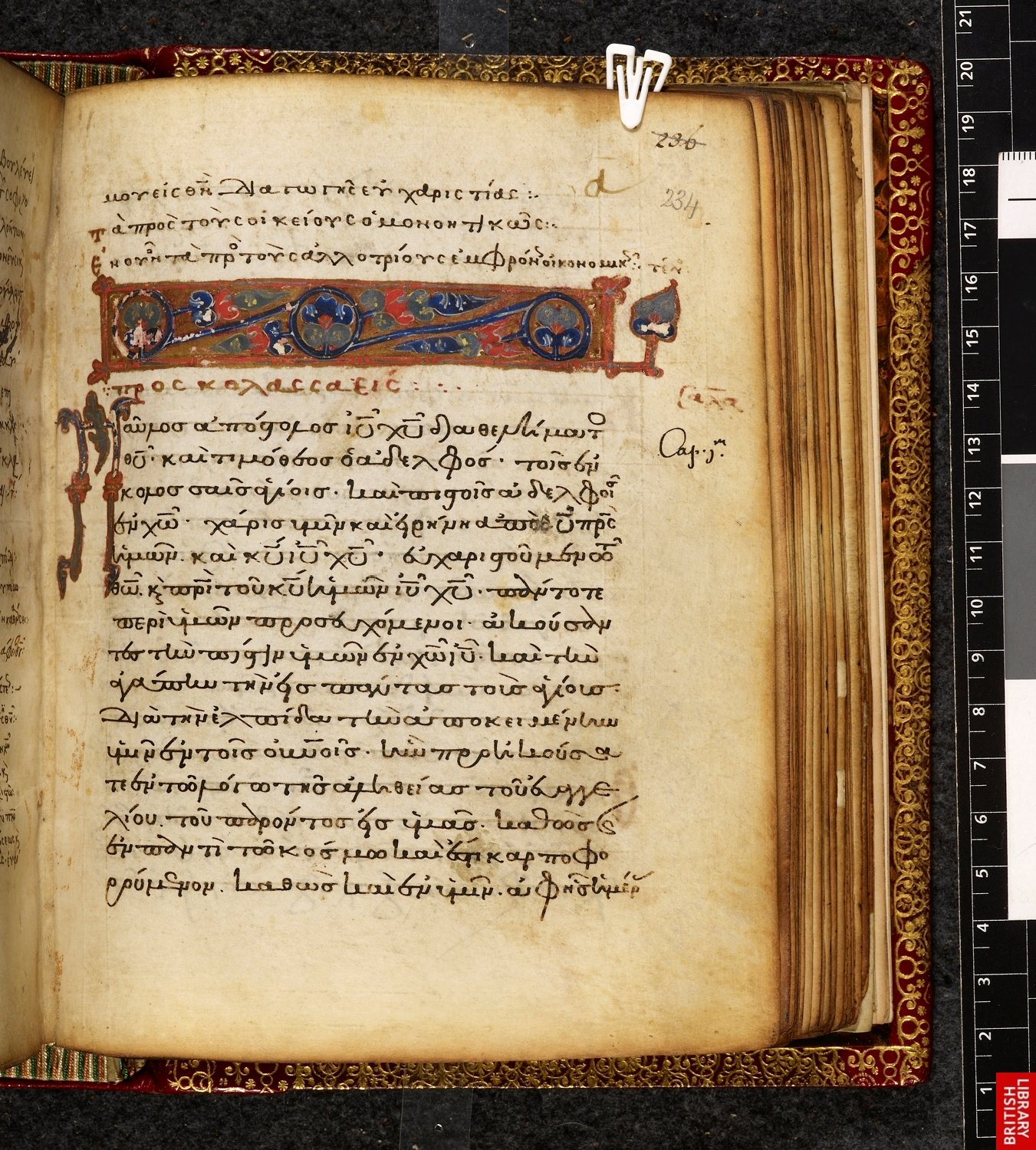
Minuscule 321

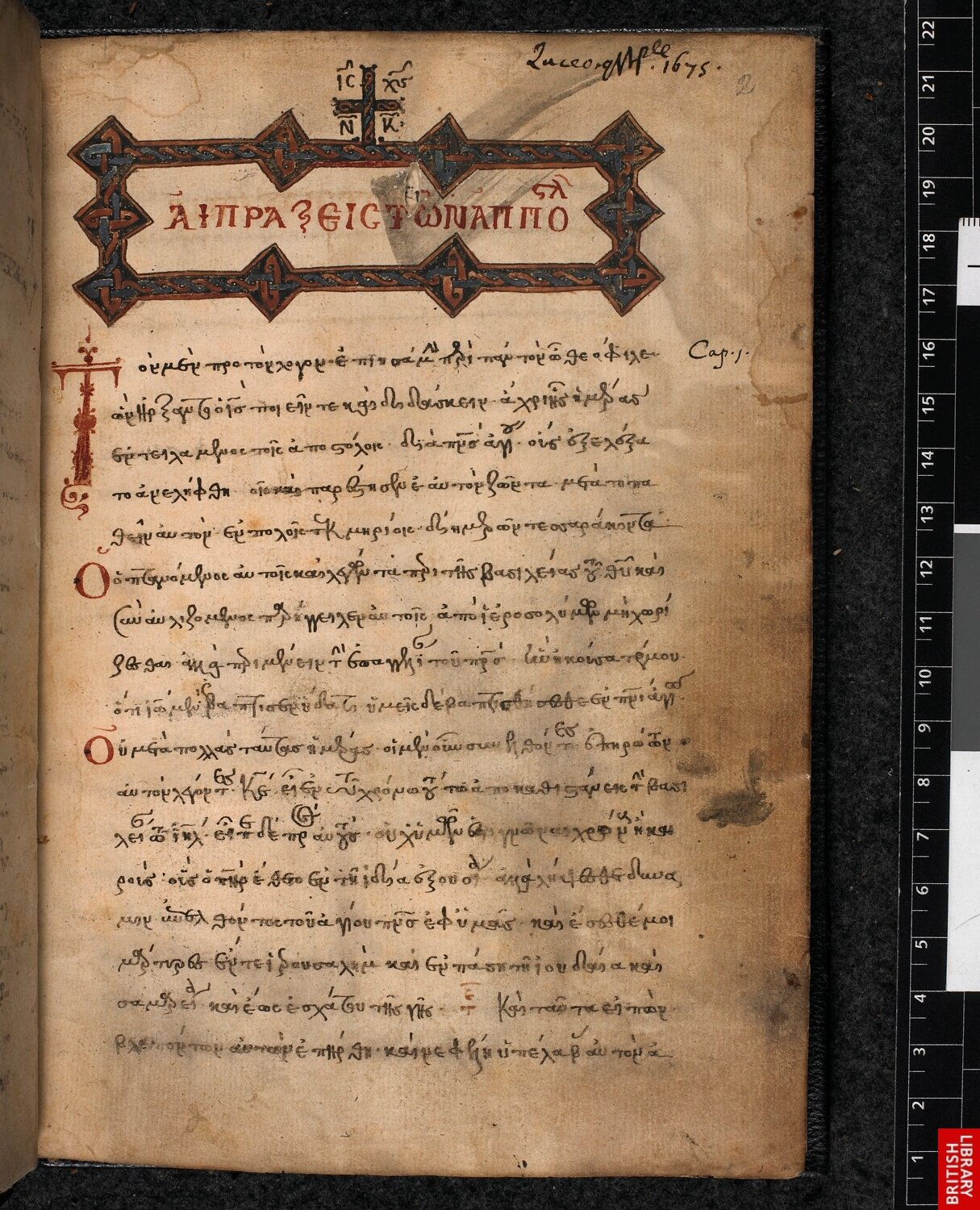
Minuscule 322

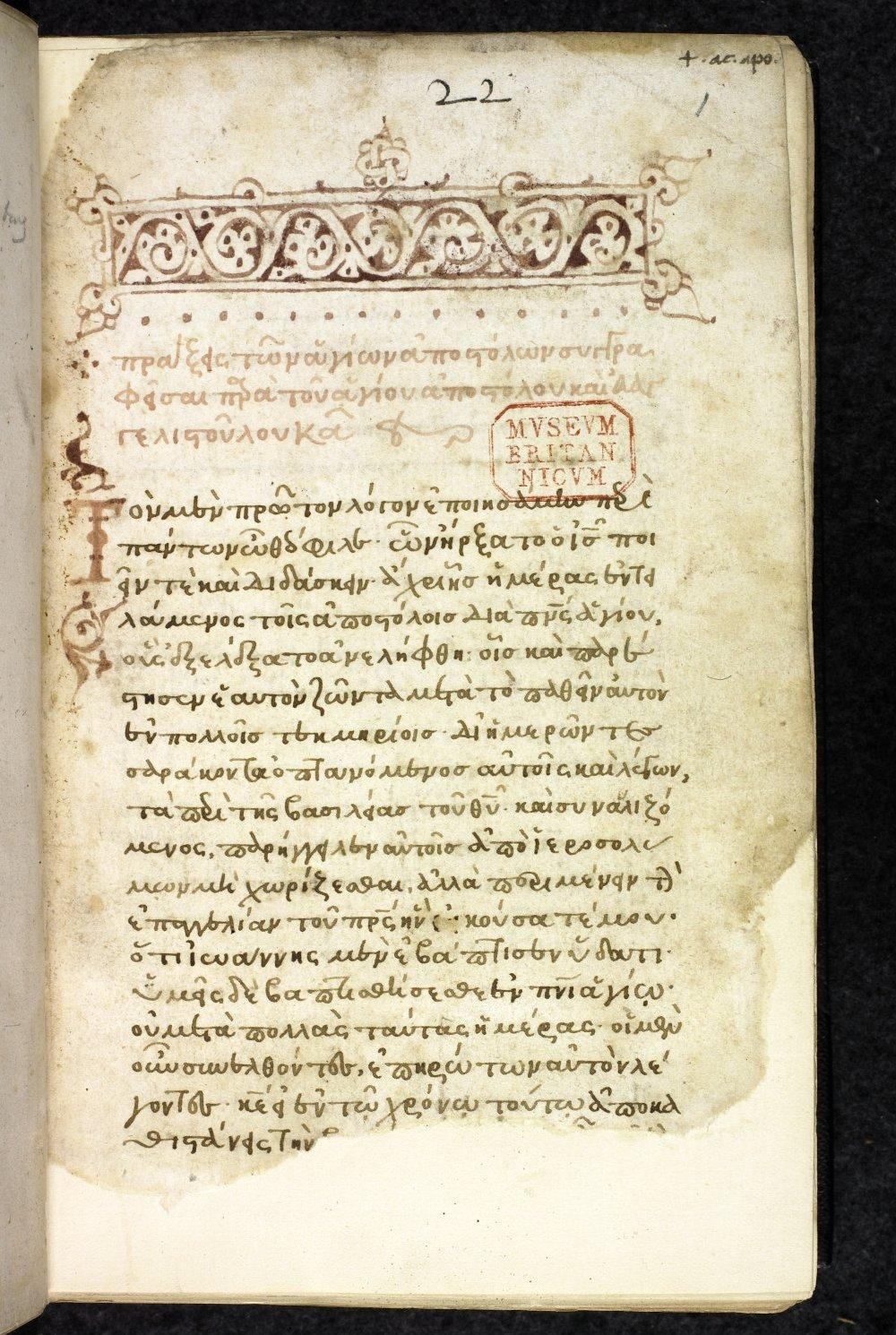
Minuscule 385

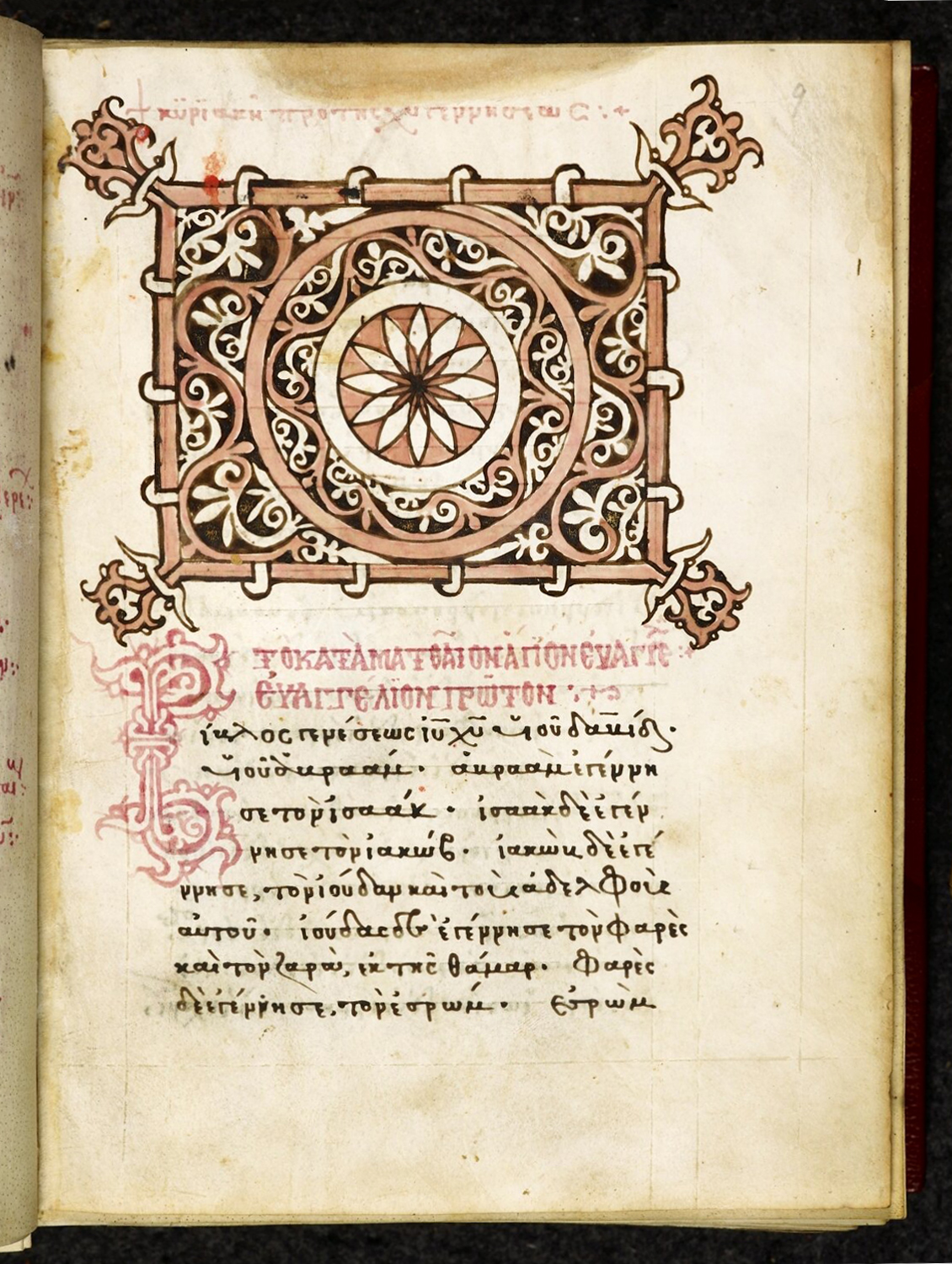
Minuscule 447

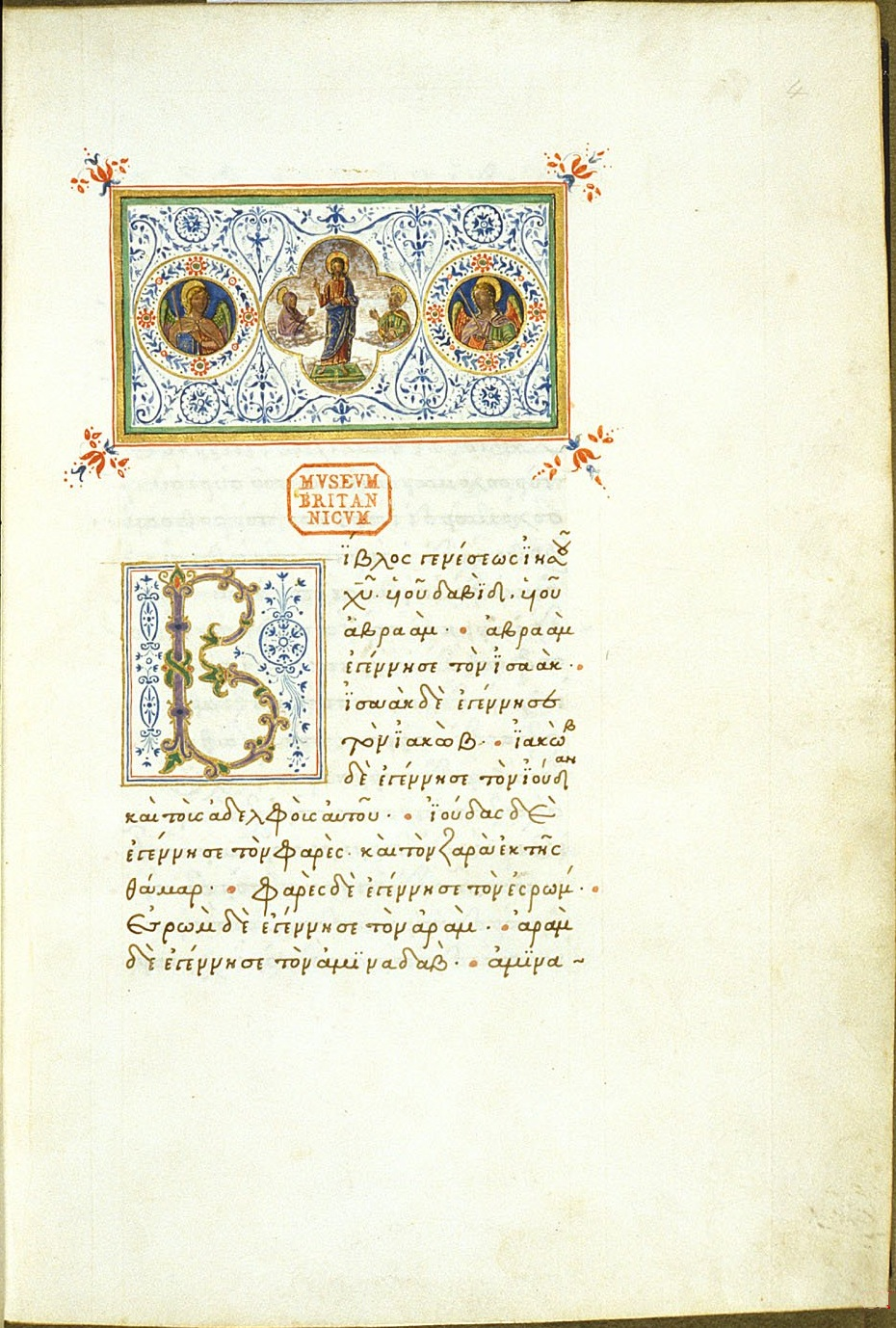
Minuscule 448

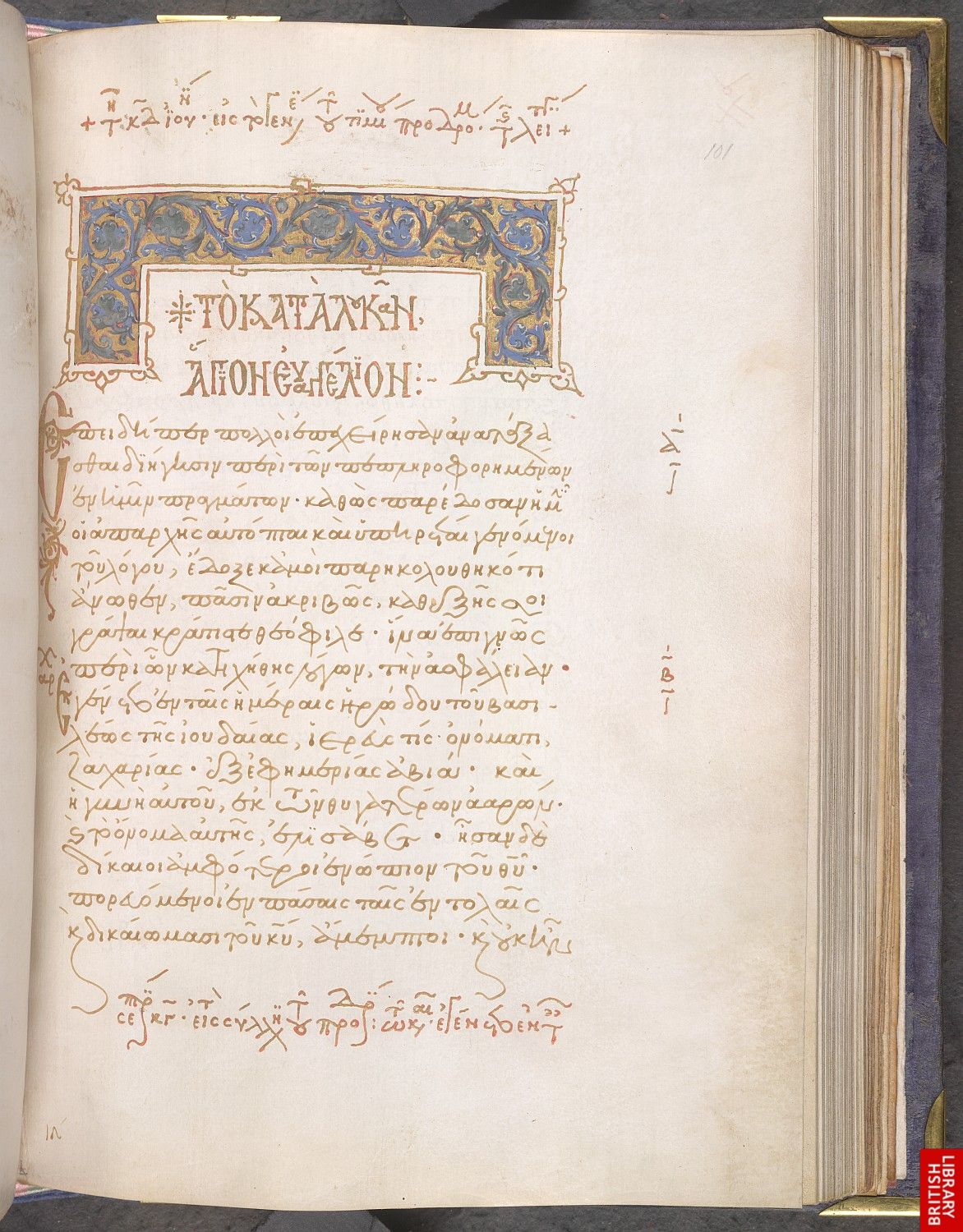
Minuscule 480

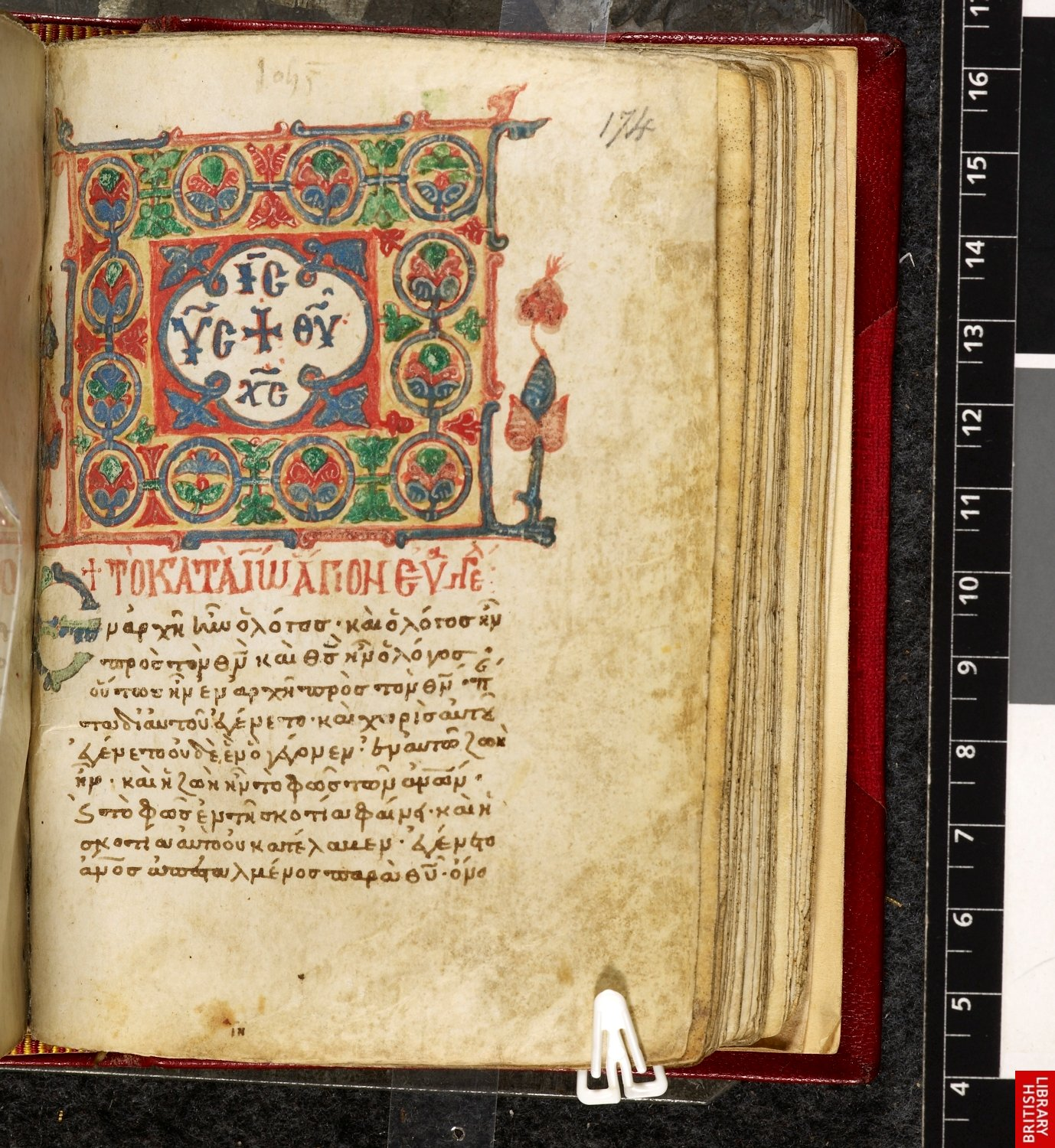
Minuscule 505

== See also ==
- List of New Testament papyri
- List of New Testament uncials
- List of New Testament minuscules (1001–2000)
- List of New Testament minuscules (2001–3000)
- List of New Testament minuscules ordered by Location/Institution
- List of New Testament lectionaries
- List of New Testament amulets

=== Lists of minuscules (1–1000) ===
- List of New Testament minuscules (1–100)
- List of New Testament minuscules (101–200)
- List of New Testament minuscules (201–300)
- List of New Testament minuscules (301–400)
- List of New Testament minuscules (401–500)
- List of New Testament minuscules (501–600)
- List of New Testament minuscules (601–700)
- List of New Testament minuscules (701–800)
- List of New Testament minuscules (801–900)
- List of New Testament minuscules (901–1000)

== Sources ==
- Aland, Kurt; M. Welte; B. Köster; K. Junack (1994). Kurzgefasste Liste der griechischen Handschriften des Neues Testaments. Berlin, New York: Walter de Gruyter. p. 95. ISBN 3-11-011986-2.
- "Liste Handschriften". Münster: Institute for New Testament Textual Research.
- Parpulov, Georgi (2021). Catena Manuscripts of the Greek New Testament (PDF). Piscataway New Jersey: Gorgias Press. p. 241. ISBN 978-1-4632-4260-2.
