= List of New Testament minuscules (101–200) =

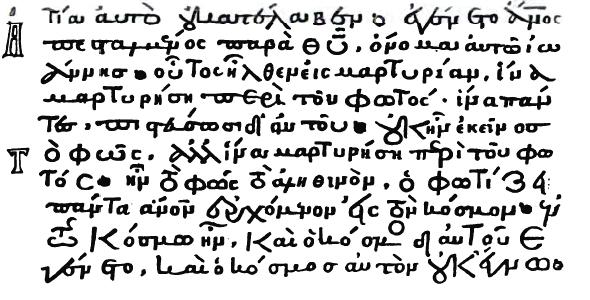
John 1:5b-10 in Codex Ebnerianus (Minuscule 105) from 12th century.

A New Testament minuscule is a copy of a portion of the New Testament written in a small, cursive Greek script (developed from Uncial).

== Legend ==
- The numbers (#) are the now standard system of Caspar René Gregory, often referred to as the Gregory-Aland numbers.
- Included among the cataloged minuscules are the following types of manuscripts, color coded:

Grey represents continuous text manuscripts containing only New Testament portions
Beige represents manuscripts with New Testament portions and a catena (quotations from church fathers)
Light cyan represents manuscripts of single-author commentaries who included the full Scripture text.
Light red represents manuscripts of single-author commentaries who included both the full Scripture text and a catena.
Light purple represents manuscripts of commentaries where the Scripture text was abridged.
White represents manuscript numbers no longer in use.

- Dates are estimated to the nearest 100 year increment where specific date is unknown.
- Content generally only describes sections of the New Testament: Gospels, The Acts of the Apostles (Acts), Pauline epistles, and so on. Sometimes the surviving portion of a codex is so limited that specific books, chapters or even verses can be indicated. Linked articles, where they exist, generally specify content in detail, by verse.
- Digital images are referenced with direct links to the hosting web pages, with the exception of those at the INTF. The quality and accessibility of the images is as follows:

Gold color indicates high resolution color images available online.
Tan color indicates high resolution color images available locally, not online.
Light tan color indicates only a small fraction of manuscript pages with color images available online.
Light gray color indicates black/white or microfilm images available online.
Light blue color indicates manuscript not imaged, and is currently lost or ownership unknown.
Light pink color indicates manuscript destroyed, presumed destroyed, or deemed too fragile to digitize.
Violet color indicates high resolution ultraviolet images available online.

† Indicates the manuscript has damaged or missing pages.
^{P} Indicates only a portion of the books were included.
^{K} Indicates manuscript also includes a commentary.
^{S} Indicates lost portions of manuscript replaced via supplement of a later hand.
^{abs} (abschrift) Indicates manuscript is copy.
[ ] Brackets around Gregory-Aland number indicate the manuscript belongs to an already numbered manuscript, was found to not be a continuous text manuscript, was found to be written in modern Greek versus Koine Greek, was proved a forgery, or has been destroyed.

== Minuscules 101-200 ==
#	Date	Contents	Pages	Institution and refs.	City, State	Country	Images
101	11th	Acts†, Pauline Epistles†, General Epistles†	85	Saxon State and University Library Dresden (SLUB), Mscr. Dresd. A. 104	Dresden	Germany	INTF
102	1444	Acts, Pauline Epistles, General Epistles	111	State Historical Museum, V. 412, S. 5	Moscow	Russia	INTF
103	12th	Theophylact Commentary on Acts, Pauline Epistles, General Epistles	333	State Historical Museum, V. 96, S. 347	Moscow	Russia	INTF
104	1087	Acts, Pauline Epistles, General Epistles, Revelation	286	British Library, Harley MS 5537	London	United Kingdom	BL
104	1087	Acts, Pauline Epistles, General Epistles, Revelation	286	British Library, Harley MS 5537	London	United Kingdom	INTF
105	12th	Gospels, Acts, Pauline Epistles, General Epistles	426	Bodleian Library, MS. Auct. T. inf. 1. 10	Oxford	United Kingdom	INTF
106	10th	Gospels	212	Chester Beatty Library, CBL W 135	Dublin	Ireland	CSNTM
106	10th	Gospels	212	Chester Beatty Library, CBL W 135	Dublin	Ireland	INTF
107	13th	Gospels	351	Bodleian Library, MS. E. D. Clarke 6	Oxford	United Kingdom	INTF
107	13th	Gospels	351	Bodleian Library, MS. E. D. Clarke 6	Oxford	United Kingdom	DB
108	11th	Gospels	426	Victor Emmanuel III National Library, Cod. Neapol. ex Vind. 3	Naples	Italy	INTF
109	1326	Gospels	225	British Library, Add MS 5117	London	United Kingdom	BL
109	1326	Gospels	225	British Library, Add MS 5117	London	United Kingdom	INTF
110	12th	Acts†, Pauline Epistles†, General Epistles†, Revelation†	156	British Library, Harley MS 5778	London	United Kingdom	BL
110	12th	Acts†, Pauline Epistles†, General Epistles†, Revelation†	156	British Library, Harley MS 5778	London	United Kingdom	INTF
111	12th	Gospels†	181	Bodleian Library, MS. E. D. Clarke 7	Oxford	United Kingdom	INTF
112	11th	Gospels	167	Bodleian Library, MS. E. D. Clarke 10	Oxford	United Kingdom	INTF
112	11th	Gospels	167	Bodleian Library, MS. E. D. Clarke 10	Oxford	United Kingdom	DB
113	11th	Gospels	270	British Library, Harley MS 1810	London	United Kingdom	BL
113	11th	Gospels	270	British Library, Harley MS 1810	London	United Kingdom	INTF
114	11th	Gospels†	280	British Library, Harley MS 5540	London	United Kingdom	BL
114	11th	Gospels†	280	British Library, Harley MS 5540	London	United Kingdom	INTF
115	10th	Gospels†	271	British Library, Harley MS 5559	London	United Kingdom	BL
115	10th	Gospels†	271	British Library, Harley MS 5559	London	United Kingdom	INTF
116	12th	Gospels	300	British Library, Harley MS 5567	London	United Kingdom	BL
116	12th	Gospels	300	British Library, Harley MS 5567	London	United Kingdom	INTF
117	15th	Gospels†	182	British Library, Harley MS 5731	London	United Kingdom	BL
117	15th	Gospels†	182	British Library, Harley MS 5731	London	United Kingdom	INTF
118	13th	Gospels†	261	Bodleian Library MS. Auct. D. inf. 2. 17	Oxford	United Kingdom	INTF, CSNTM
119	12th	Gospels	237	National Library, Grec 85	Paris	France	BnF, INTF, CSNTM
120	12th	Matthew, Luke, John	125	National Library, Supplément grec 185, fol. 1-39.68-153	Paris	France	BnF, INTF
121	13th	Gospels†	241	Sainte-Geneviève Library, 3398	Paris	France	INTF
122	12th	Gospels, Acts†, Pauline Epistles†, General Epistles^{P}†	222	Leiden University Library, B. P. Gr. 74^{a}	Leiden	Netherlands	INTF
123	1000	Gospels	326	Austrian National Library, Theol. Gr. 240	Vienna	Austria	CSNTM, INTF
124	12th	Gospels	188	Austrian National Library, Theol. Gr. 188	Vienna	Austria	INTF, CSNTM
125	11th	Gospels	301	Austrian National Library, Suppl. gr. 50, fol. 5-305	Vienna	Austria	CSNTM, INTF
126	12th	Gospels	219	Herzog August Library, Codd. Aug. 16. 6. 4	Wolfenbüttel	Germany	INTF
127	11th	Gospels	378	Vatican Library, Vat.gr.349	Vatican City	Vatican City	DVL
128	13th	Gospels	377	Vatican Library, Vat.gr.356	Vatican City	Vatican City	DVL, INTF
129	12th	Gospels	355	Vatican Library, Vat.gr.358	Vatican City	Vatican City	DVL
129	12th	Gospels	355	Vatican Library, Vat.gr.358	Vatican City	Vatican City	INTF
130	15th	Gospels†	229	Vatican Library, Vat.gr.359	Vatican City	Vatican City	INTF
131	14th	Gospels, Acts, Pauline Epistles, General Epistles	233	Vatican Library, Vat.gr.360	Vatican City	Vatican City	INTF, CSNTM
132	12th	Gospels	292	Vatican Library, Vat.gr.361	Vatican City	Vatican City	INTF
133	11th	Gospels, Acts, Pauline Epistles, General Epistles	332	Vatican Library, Vat.gr.363	Vatican City	Vatican City	DVL, INTF
134	12th	Gospels	297	Vatican Library, Vat.gr.364	Vatican City	Vatican City	DVL
134	12th	Gospels	297	Vatican Library, Vat.gr.364	Vatican City	Vatican City	INTF
135	10th	Gospels†	181	Vatican Library, Vat.gr.365	Vatican City	Vatican City	INTF
136	13th	Zigabenus Commentary on Matthew†, Mark†	235	Vatican Library, Vat.gr.665	Vatican City	Vatican City	INTF
137	11th	Gospels	300	Vatican Library, Vat.gr.756	Vatican City	Vatican City	DVL
137	11th	Gospels	300	Vatican Library, Vat.gr.756	Vatican City	Vatican City	INTF
138	11th	Gospels†	380	Vatican Library, Vat.gr.757	Vatican City	Vatican City	DVL, INTF
139	1173	Luke, John	233	Vatican Library, Vat.gr.758	Vatican City	Vatican City	DVL
139	1173	Luke, John	233	Vatican Library, Vat.gr.758	Vatican City	Vatican City	INTF
140	13th	Gospels†	408	Vatican Library, Vat.gr.1158	Vatican City	Vatican City	DVL
140	13th	Gospels†	408	Vatican Library, Vat.gr.1158	Vatican City	Vatican City	INTF
141	13th	New Testament	400	Vatican Library, Vat.gr.1160	Vatican City	Vatican City	INTF
142	11th	Gospels, Acts, Pauline Epistles, General Epistles	324	Vatican Library, Vat.gr.1210	Vatican City	Vatican City	INTF
143	11th	Gospels	275	Vatican Library, Vat.gr.1229	Vatican City	Vatican City	DVL
143	11th	Gospels	275	Vatican Library, Vat.gr.1229	Vatican City	Vatican City	INTF
144	10th	Gospels†	268	Vatican Library, Vat.gr.1254	Vatican City	Vatican City	INTF
145	11th	Luke†, John†	161	Vatican Library, Vat.gr.1548	Vatican City	Vatican City	INTF
146	12th	Matthew, Mark	265	Vatican Library, Pal.gr.5	Vatican City	Vatican City	HU
146	12th	Matthew, Mark	265	Vatican Library, Pal.gr.5	Vatican City	Vatican City	INTF
147	13th	Gospels	355	Vatican Library, Pal.gr.89	Vatican City	Vatican City	HU
147	13th	Gospels	355	Vatican Library, Pal.gr.89	Vatican City	Vatican City	INTF
148	11th	Gospels	153	Vatican Library, Pal.gr.136	Vatican City	Vatican City	HUL
149	15th	New Testament	179	Vatican Library, Pal.gr.171	Vatican City	Vatican City	DVL, INTF
150	11th	Gospels	331	Vatican Library, Pal.gr.189	Vatican City	Vatican City	DVL
150	11th	Gospels	331	Vatican Library, Pal.gr.189	Vatican City	Vatican City	INTF
151	10th	Gospels	224	Vatican Library, Pal.gr.220	Vatican City	Vatican City	DVL
151	10th	Gospels	224	Vatican Library, Pal.gr.220	Vatican City	Vatican City	INTF
152	13th	Gospels	315	Vatican Library, Pal.gr.227	Vatican City	Vatican City	INTF
153	14th	Gospels	268	Vatican Library, Pal.gr.229	Vatican City	Vatican City	HU
154	13th	Theophylact Commentary on the Gospels	355	Vatican Library, Reg.gr.28	Vatican City	Vatican City	INTF
155	13th	Gospels	307	Vatican Library, Reg.gr.79	Vatican City	Vatican City	DVL, INTF
156	12th	Gospels	244	Vatican Library, Reg.gr.189	Vatican City	Vatican City	INTF
157	1122	Gospels	325	Vatican Library, Urb.gr.2	Vatican City	Vatican City	DVL
157	1122	Gospels	325	Vatican Library, Urb.gr.2	Vatican City	Vatican City	CSNTM, INTF
158	11th	Gospels	236	Vatican Library, Reg.gr.Pii.II.55	Vatican City	Vatican City	INTF
159	1121	Gospels†	203	Vatican Library, Barb.gr.482	Vatican City	Vatican City	DVL, INTF
160	1123	Gospels	216	Vatican Library, Barb.gr.445	Vatican City	Vatican City	INTF
161	10th	Gospels†	203	Vatican Library, Barb.gr.352	Vatican City	Vatican City	INTF
162	1153	Gospels	248	Vatican Library, Barb.gr.449	Vatican City	Vatican City	DVL
162	1153	Gospels	248	Vatican Library, Barb.gr.449	Vatican City	Vatican City	INTF
163	1193	Gospels	173	Vatican Library, Barb.gr.520	Vatican City	Vatican City	INTF
164	1039	Gospels	214	Vatican Library, Barb. gr. 319	Vatican City	Vatican City	INTF
165	1292	Gospels	214	Vatican Library, Barb.gr.541	Vatican City	Vatican City	DVL, INTF
166	11th/12th	Luke†, John†	75	Vatican Library, Barb.gr.412	Vatican City	Vatican City	INTF
167	13th	Gospels	264	Vatican Library, Barb.gr.287	Vatican City	Vatican City	INTF
168	13th	Theophylact Commentary on the Gospels†	217	Vatican Library, Barb.gr.570	Vatican City	Vatican City	DVL, INTF
169	11th	Gospels	252	Vallicelliana Library, ms.B. 133	Rome	Italy	IC
169	11th	Gospels	252	Vallicelliana Library, ms.B. 133	Rome	Italy	INTF
170	13th	Gospels†	277	Vallicelliana Library, ms.C. 61	Rome	Italy	INTF
171	14th	Gospels	254	Vallicelliana Library, ms.C 73 II	Rome	Italy	IC
171	14th	Gospels	254	Vallicelliana Library, ms.C 73 II	Rome	Italy	INTF
172	13th/14th	Acts†, Pauline Epistles†, General Epistles†, Rev.†	234	Berlin State Library, Phill. 1461	Berlin	Germany	INTF
173	12th	Gospels†	155	Vatican Library, Vat.gr.1983	Vatican City	Vatican City	DVL, INTF
174	1052	Gospels†	132	Vatican Library, Vat.gr.2002	Vatican City	Vatican City	INTF
175	10th/11th	New Testament†	247	Vatican Library, Vat.gr.2080	Vatican City	Vatican City	INTF
176	13th	Gospels†	77	Vatican Library, Vat.gr.2113	Vatican City	Vatican City	INTF
177	11th	Acts, Pauline Epistles, General Epistles, Revelation	225	Bavarian State Library, Cod.graec. 211	Munich	Germany	BSB
177	11th	Acts, Pauline Epistles, General Epistles, Revelation	225	Bavarian State Library, Cod.graec. 211	Munich	Germany	INTF
178	12th	Gospels	272	Angelica Library, Ang. gr. 123	Rome	Italy	IC
178	12th	Gospels	272	Angelica Library, Ang. gr. 123	Rome	Italy	CSNTM, INTF
179	12th	Gospels†	249	Angelica Library, Ang. gr. 11	Rome	Italy	IC
179	12th	Gospels†	249	Angelica Library, Ang. gr. 11	Rome	Italy	INTF
180	12th/13th	Gospels	238	Vatican Library, Borg.gr.18 (fol. 1-238)	Vatican City	Vatican City	INTF
181	10th	Acts, Pauline Epistles†, General Epistles	155	Vatican Library, Reg.gr.179 (fol. 1-155)	Vatican City	Vatican City	INTF
182	14th	Gospels	226	Laurentian Library, Plut.06.11	Florence	Italy	BML, INTF
183	12th	Gospels	349	Laurentian Library, Plut.06.14	Florence	Italy	BML, INTF
184	13th	Gospels	72	Laurentian Library, Plut.06.15	Florence	Italy	BML, INTF
185	14th	Gospels	341	Laurentian Library, Plut.06.16	Florence	Italy	BML, INTF
186	11th	Gospels	268	Laurentian Library, Plut.06.18	Florence	Italy	BML, INTF
187	12th	Gospels	212	Laurentian Library, Plut.06.23	Florence	Italy	BML, INTF
188	12th	Gospels	228	Laurentian Library, Plut.06.25	Florence	Italy	BML, INTF
189	14th	Gospels†, Acts, Pauline Epistles, General Epistles	452	Laurentian Library, Plut.06.27	Florence	Italy	BML, INTF
190	14th	Gospels	439	Laurentian Library, Plut.06.28	Florence	Italy	BML, INTF
191	12th	Gospels	180	Laurentian Library, Plut.06.29	Florence	Italy	BML, INTF
192	13th	Gospels	200	Laurentian Library, Plut.06.30	Florence	Italy	BML, INTF
193	12th	Gospels	165	Laurentian Library, Plut.06.32	Florence	Italy	BML, INTF
194	11th	Gospels†	258	Laurentian Library, Plut.06.33	Florence	Italy	BML, INTF
195	11th	Gospels	277	Laurentian Library, Plut.06.34	Florence	Italy	BML, INTF
196	12th	Zigabenus Commentary on the Gospels†	369	Laurentian Library, Plut.08.12	Florence	Italy	BML, INTF
197	11th	Matthew†, Mark, James†	154	Laurentian Library, Plut.08.14	Florence	Italy	BML, INTF
198	13th	Gospels	171	Laurentian Library, Edili 221	Florence	Italy	BML, CSNTM, INTF
199	12th	Gospels	214	Laurentian Library, Conv. Sopp. 160	Florence	Italy	CSNTM, INTF
200	11th	Gospels	229	Laurentian Library, Conv. Sopp. 159	Florence	Italy	BML, CSNTM, INTF

[top]

== Gallery ==
Some manuscripts

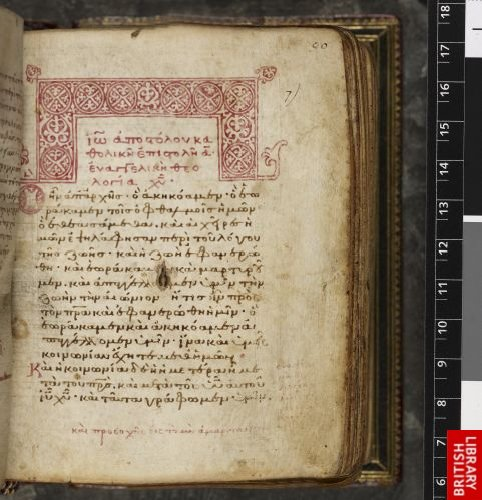
Minuscule 104

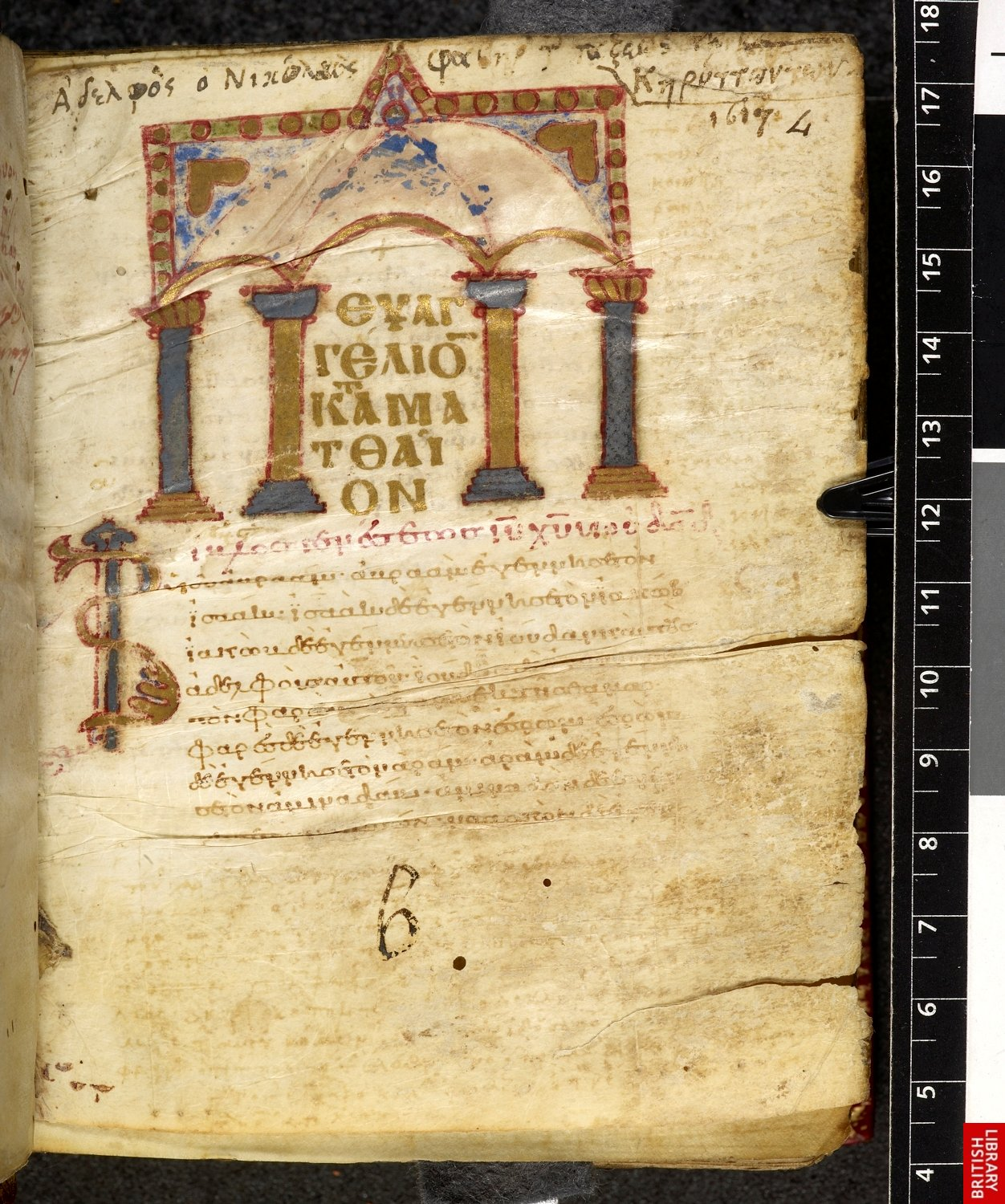
Minuscule 114

== See also ==
- List of New Testament papyri
- List of New Testament uncials
- List of New Testament minuscules (1–1000)
- List of New Testament minuscules (1001–2000)
- List of New Testament minuscules (2001–)
- List of New Testament minuscules ordered by Location/Institution
- List of New Testament lectionaries

== Bibliography ==
- Aland, Kurt; M. Welte; B. Köster; K. Junack (1994). Kurzgefasste Liste der griechischen Handschriften des Neues Testaments. Berlin, New York: Walter de Gruyter. p. 95. ISBN 3-11-011986-2.
- "Liste Handschriften". Münster: Institute for New Testament Textual Research.
