= Minuscule 780 =

- New Testament manuscript
- Text: Gospels
- Date: 11th century
- Script: Greek
- Now at: National Library of Greece
- Size: 20 cm by 16 cm
- Type: mixed
- Category: none
- Note: –

Minuscule 780 (in the Gregory-Aland numbering), ε198 (von Soden), is a Greek minuscule manuscript of the New Testament written on parchment. Palaeographically it has been assigned to the 11th century. The manuscript has complex contents.

== Description ==
The codex contains the text of the four Gospels, on 241 parchment leaves (size 20 cm by 16 cm). The text is written in one column per page, 22 lines per page. The texts of John 17:9-18:1; 21:3-25 were supplied by a later hand.

The text is divided according to the κεφαλαια (chapters), with their τιτλοι (titles of chapters) at the top of the pages. There is also another division according to the smaller Ammonian Sections (in Mark 235 Sections - 16:12), with references to the Eusebian Canons.

It contains Argumentum (to Matthew), Prolegomena, tables of the κεφαλαια (tables of contents) with a harmony, lectionary markings at the margin (later hand). It contains scholia on the first seven leaves.

== Text ==
Kurt Aland did not place the Greek text of the codex in any Category.

According to the Claremont Profile Method it represent the textual family K^{x} in Luke 10 and Luke 20. In Luke 1, it has mixed text.

It lacks texts of Matthew 16:2b–3 and Pericope Adulterae (John 7:53-8:11).

== History ==
C. R. Gregory dated the manuscript to the 11th century. The manuscript is currently dated by the INTF to the 11th century.

The manuscript was noticed in catalogue from 1876.

It was added to the list of New Testament manuscripts by Gregory (780). Gregory saw the manuscript in 1886.

The manuscript is now housed at the National Library of Greece (121) in Athens.

== See also ==
- List of New Testament minuscules
- Biblical manuscript
- Textual criticism
- Minuscule 779
