= List of New Testament minuscules (1201–1300) =

A New Testament minuscule is a copy of a portion of the New Testament written in a small, cursive Greek script (developed from Uncial).

== Legend ==
- The numbers (#) are the now standard system of Caspar René Gregory, often referred to as the Gregory-Aland numbers.
- Included among the cataloged minuscules are the following types of manuscripts, color coded:

Grey represents continuous text manuscripts containing only New Testament portions
Beige represents manuscripts with New Testament portions and a catena (quotations from church fathers)
Light cyan represents manuscripts of single-author commentaries who included the full Scripture text.
Light red represents manuscripts of single-author commentaries who included both the full Scripture text and a catena.
Light purple represents manuscripts of commentaries where the Scripture text was abridged.
White represents manuscript numbers no longer in use.

- Dates are estimated to the nearest 100 year increment where specific date is unknown.
- Content generally only describes sections of the New Testament: Gospels, The Acts of the Apostles (Acts), Pauline epistles, and so on. Sometimes the surviving portion of a codex is so limited that specific books, chapters or even verses can be indicated. Linked articles, where they exist, generally specify content in detail, by verse.
- Digital images are referenced with direct links to the hosting web pages, with the exception of those at the INTF. The quality and accessibility of the images is as follows:

Gold color indicates high resolution color images available online.
Tan color indicates high resolution color images available locally, not online.
Light tan color indicates only a small fraction of manuscript pages with color images available online.
Light gray color indicates black/white or microfilm images available online.
Light blue color indicates manuscript not imaged, and is currently lost or ownership unknown.
Light pink color indicates manuscript destroyed, presumed destroyed, or deemed too fragile to digitize.
Violet color indicates high resolution ultraviolet images available online.

† Indicates the manuscript has damaged or missing pages.
^{P} Indicates only a portion of the books were included.
^{K} Indicates manuscript also includes a commentary.
^{S} Indicates lost portions of manuscript replaced via supplement of a later hand.
^{abs} (abschrift) Indicates manuscript is copy.
[ ] Brackets around Gregory-Aland number indicate the manuscript belongs to an already numbered manuscript, was found to not be a continuous text manuscript, was found to be written in modern Greek versus Koine Greek, was proved a forgery, or has been destroyed.

== Minuscules 1201–1300 ==
#	Date	Contents	Pages	Institution and refs.	City, State	Country	Images
1201	13th	Gospels	245	Saint Catherine's Monastery, Gr. 164	Sinai	Egypt	LOC, INTF, CSNTM
1202	15th	Gospels	422	Saint Catherine's Monastery, Gr. 165	Sinai	Egypt	LOC, CSNTM
1203	10th	Gospels	200	Saint Catherine's Monastery, Gr. 166	Sinai	Egypt	LOC, INTF, CSNTM
1204	12th	Gospels	134	Saint Catherine's Monastery, Gr. 167	Sinai	Egypt	LOC, INTF, CSNTM
1205	13th	Gospels	254	Saint Catherine's Monastery, Gr. 168	Sinai	Egypt	LOC, CSNTM
1205	13th	Gospels	1	National Library of Russia, Gr. 313	Saint Petersburg	Russia	INTF
1206	1247	Gospels†	120	Saint Catherine's Monastery, Gr. 169	Sinai	Egypt	LOC, INTF, CSNTM
1206	1247	Gospels†	1	National Library of Russia, Gr. 308	Saint Petersburg	Russia	INTF
1207	11th	Gospels	285	Saint Catherine's Monastery, Gr. 170	Sinai	Egypt	LOC, INTF, CSNTM
1208	13th	Gospels	257	Saint Catherine's Monastery, Gr. 171	Sinai	Egypt	LOC, CSNTM
1209	1067	Gospels	207	Saint Catherine's Monastery, Gr. 172	Sinai	Egypt	LOC, INTF, CSNTM
1209	1067	Gospels	3	National Library of Russia, Gr. 291	Saint Petersburg	Russia	INTF
1210	11th	Gospels	246	Saint Catherine's Monastery, Gr. 173	Sinai	Egypt	LOC, INTF, CSNTM
1211	11th	Gospels	291	Saint Catherine's Monastery, Gr. 174	Sinai	Egypt	LOC, INTF, CSNTM
1211	11th	Gospels	3	National Library of Russia, Gr. 68	Saint Petersburg	Russia	INTF
1212	11th	Gospels	325	Saint Catherine's Monastery, Gr. 175	Sinai	Egypt	LOC, CSNTM
1213	13th	Gospels	302	Saint Catherine's Monastery, Gr. 176	Sinai	Egypt	LOC, CSNTM
1214	11th	Gospels	305	Saint Catherine's Monastery, Gr. 177	Sinai	Egypt	LOC, CSNTM
1215	13th	Gospels	200	Saint Catherine's Monastery, Gr. 178	Sinai	Egypt	LOC, INTF, CSNTM
1216	11th	Gospels	282	Saint Catherine's Monastery, Gr. 179	Sinai	Egypt	LOC, INTF, CSNTM
1217	1186	Gospels	261	Saint Catherine's Monastery, Gr. 180	Sinai	Egypt	LOC, INTF, CSNTM
1218	12th	Gospels	412	Saint Catherine's Monastery, Gr. 181	Sinai	Egypt	LOC, INTF, CSNTM
1219	11th	Gospels	261	Saint Catherine's Monastery, Gr. 182	Sinai	Egypt	LOC, INTF, CSNTM
1220	10th	Gospels†	125	Saint Catherine's Monastery, Gr. 183	Sinai	Egypt	LOC, CSNTM
1220	10th	Gospels†	3	National Library of Russia, Oct. 153	Saint Petersburg	Russia	INTF
1221	11th	Gospels†	185	Saint Catherine's Monastery, Gr. 184	Sinai	Egypt	LOC, CSNTM
1222	11th	Gospels	167	Saint Catherine's Monastery, Gr. 185	Sinai	Egypt	LOC, CSNTM
1223	10th	Gospels	232	Saint Catherine's Monastery, Gr. 186	Sinai	Egypt	LOC, INTF, CSNTM
1224	12th	Gospels	259	Saint Catherine's Monastery, Gr. 187	Sinai	Egypt	LOC, INTF, CSNTM
1225	10th	Gospels	248	Saint Catherine's Monastery, Gr. 188	Sinai	Egypt	LOC, INTF, CSNTM
1226	13th	Gospels	200	Saint Catherine's Monastery, Gr. 189	Sinai	Egypt	LOC, INTF, CSNTM
1227	12th + 14th	Gospels^{S}	267	Saint Catherine's Monastery, Gr. 190	Sinai	Egypt	LOC, INTF, CSNTM
1228	12th	Matthew 1:1-10:22†, 28:19-20, Luke† 6:3-24:53, John 1:1-20:11†	92	Saint Catherine's Monastery, Gr. 191	Sinai	Egypt	LOC, INTF, CSNTM
1229	13th	Gospels †	331	Saint Catherine's Monastery, Gr. 192	Sinai	Egypt	LOC, INTF, CSNTM
1230	1124	Gospels	328	Saint Catherine's Monastery, Gr. 193	Sinai	Egypt	LOC, INTF, CSNTM
1231 + [572]	12th	Mark 1:34-44; 2:14-8:3; 8:3-9:42.46-50	58	Saint Catherine's Monastery, Gr. 194, 58 fol.	Sinai	Egypt	LOC, INTF, CSNTM
1231 + [572]	12th	Mark 1:34-44; 2:14-8:3; 8:3-9:42.46-50	19	National Library of Russia, Gr. 99, 19 fol.	Saint Petersburg	Russia	INTF
1232	15th	Gospels †	204	Saint Catherine's Monastery, Gr. 195	Sinai	Egypt	LOC, CSNTM
1233	15th	Gospels	206	Saint Catherine's Monastery, Gr. 196	Sinai	Egypt	LOC, CSNTM
1234	14th	Gospels	155	Saint Catherine's Monastery, Gr. 197	Sinai	Egypt	LOC, CSNTM
1235	14th	Gospels	255	Saint Catherine's Monastery, Gr. 198	Sinai	Egypt	LOC, CSNTM
1236	14th	Gospels	162	Saint Catherine's Monastery, Gr. 199	Sinai	Egypt	LOC, INTF, CSNTM
1237	15th	Gospels	289	Saint Catherine's Monastery, Gr. 200	Sinai	Egypt	LOC, INTF, CSNTM
1238 + [2167]	1243	Matthew†, Luke†, John†	131	Saint Catherine's Monastery, Gr. 201	Sinai	Egypt	LOC, INTF, CSNTM
1238 + [2167]	1243	Matthew†, Luke†, John†	1	National Library of Russia, Gr. 396 (John 1:20-38)	Saint Petersburg	Russia	INTF
1239	16th	Gospels	392	Saint Catherine's Monastery, Gr. 203	Sinai	Egypt	LOC, INTF, CSNTM
1240	12th	Theophylact Commentary the Acts, General Epistles, & Pauline Epistles. Gospels (no commentary).	277	Saint Catherine's Monastery, Gr. 259	Sinai	Egypt	LOC, INTF, CSNTM
1241	12th	Gospels, Acts, General Epistles†, Pauline Epistles	193	Saint Catherine's Monastery, Gr. 260	Sinai	Egypt	LOC, CSNTM
1242	13th	Gospels, Acts, General Epistles, Pauline Epistles	273	Saint Catherine's Monastery, Gr. 261	Sinai	Egypt	LOC, INTF, CSNTM
1243	11th	Gospels, Acts, General Epistles, Pauline Epistles	281	Saint Catherine's Monastery, Gr. 262	Sinai	Egypt	LOC, INTF, CSNTM
1244	11th	Acts, General Epistles, Pauline epistles	279	Saint Catherine's Monastery, Gr. 274	Sinai	Egypt	LOC, INTF, CSNTM
1245	12th	Acts, General Epistles, Pauline epistles	344	Saint Catherine's Monastery, Gr. 275	Sinai	Egypt	LOC, INTF, CSNTM
1246	?	Gospels, Acts, General Epistles, Pauline Epistles		Owner unknown. Formerly Saint Catherine's Monastery, Gr. 265	?	?	
1247	15th	Gospels, Acts, General Epistles, Pauline Epistles	344	Saint Catherine's Monastery, Gr. 266	Sinai	Egypt	LOC, INTFCSNTM
1248	14th	New Testament	389	Saint Catherine's Monastery, Gr. 267	Sinai	Egypt	LOC, INTF, CSNTM
1249	1324	Acts†, General Epistles†, Pauline epistles†	313	Saint Catherine's Monastery, Gr. 276	Sinai	Egypt	LOC, CSNTM
1250	15th	Gospels†, Acts†, General Epistles†, Pauline Epistles†	319	Saint Catherine's Monastery, Gr. 269	Sinai	Egypt	LOC, INTF, CSNTM
1251	13th	Gospels†, Acts†, General Epistles†, Pauline Epistles†	268	Saint Catherine's Monastery, Gr. 270	Sinai	Egypt	LOC, INTF, CSNTM
1252	1306	Theophylact Commentary on the Gospels	350	Saint Catherine's Monastery, Gr. 302	Sinai	Egypt	LOC, CSNTM
1253	15th	Gospels†	209	Saint Catherine's Monastery, Gr. 303	Sinai	Egypt	LOC, INTF, CSNTM
1254	14th	Theophylact Commentary on Matthew	88	Saint Catherine's Monastery, Gr. 304	Sinai	Egypt	LOC, CSNTM
1255	13th	Theophylact Commentary on Luke†	321	Saint Catherine's Monastery, Gr. 305	Sinai	Egypt	LOC, CSNTM
1256	13th	Theophylact Commentary on Luke, John	197	Saint Catherine's Monastery, Gr. 306	Sinai	Egypt	LOC, CSNTM
[1257]	11th	Gospels†	251	Burned? Formerly: Evangelical School, Γ' 1	İzmir	Turkey	
[1258]	13th	Gospels	209	Burned? Formerly: Evangelical School, Γ' 2	İzmir	Turkey	
[1259]	15th	Gospels	290	Burned? Formerly: Evangelical School, Γ' 5	İzmir	Turkey	
1260	1460	Matthew	56	Library of the Municipality and of the Etruscan Academy of Cortona, 201	Cortona	Italy	INTF
1261	13th	Theophylact Commentary on the Gospels	345	National Library, Coislin 128	Paris	France	INTF
1262	14th	Theophylact Commentary on the Gospels	317	National Library, Coislin 129	Paris	France	INTF
1263	14th	Theophylact Commentary on the Gospels	435	National Library, Coislin 198	Paris	France	INTF
1264	15th	Luke (Nicetas Catena)	605	National Library, Coislin 201	Paris	France	INTF
1265	13th	Theophylact Commentary on the Gospels†	227	National Library, Coislin 203	Paris	France	BnF
1266	10th/11th	Gospels	433	National Library, Coislin 206	Paris	France	BnF
1267	14th	Theophylact Commentary on John†, Romans-Colossians†	299	National Library, Coislin 207	Paris	France	INTF
1268	13th	Theophylact Commentary on the Gospels	267	British Library, Add MS 19386	London	UK	BL
1268	13th	Theophylact Commentary on the Gospels	267	British Library, Add MS 19386	London	UK	INTF
1269	14th	Gospels	126	Vatican Library, Urb.gr.4	Vatican City	Vatican City	INTF
1270	11th	Acts, General Epistles, Pauline epistles	279	Estense Library, G. 71, α.W.2.7 (II C IV)	Modena	Italy	INTF, CSNTM
1271	14th	Theophylact Commentary on John†	44	National Library, 2110	Athens	Greece	INTF
1272	15th	Gospels†	299	National Library, 136	Athens	Greece	CSNTM
1273	1128	Gospels	200	Public Library, Ms. 29	Auckland	New Zealand	CSNTM
1273	1128	Gospels	200	Public Library, Ms. 29	Auckland	New Zealand	INTF
1274	11th	Matthew, Mark	33	British Library, Add MS 11859 (4 fol.). 11860 (29 fol.)	London	UK	BL
1275	12th	Luke-John†	39	Owner unknown, Formerly: Drew University, Ms. 4	Madison, NJ	USA	
1276	12th	Mark-Luke	79	Owner unknown, Formerly: Drew University, Ms. 5	Madison, NJ	USA	
1277	11th	Acts-2 Timothy†	276	Cambridge University Library, Add. Mss. 3046	Cambridge	UK	INTF
1278	12th	Gospels	352	John Rylands University Library, Gr. Ms. 17	Manchester	UK	INTF
1279	11th	Gospels	213	British Library, Add MS 34107	London	UK	BL
1279	11th	Gospels	213	British Library, Add MS 34107	London	UK	INTF
1280	15th	Gospels	175	British Library, Add MS 34108	London	UK	BL
1281 = [767]	10th	Gospels†	259	Fitzwilliam Museum, McClean Collection	Cambridge	UK	INTF
1282 = [2293]	12th	Gospels†	246	Lutheran School of Theology at Chicago, Gruber Ms. 44	Maywood, IL	USA	CSNTM
1283	14th	Mark 11:25-12:40†	2	Burgerbibliothek, Cod. 579.21, fol. 123, 124	Bern	Switzerland	
1284	12th	John 12:35-13:2†	1	University of Leipzig, Cod. Gr. 72	Leipzig	Germany	INTF
1285	13th	Gospels†	143	University of Göttingen, 8 Cod. Ms. theol. 29 Cim.	Göttingen	Germany	INTF
1286	11th	Gospels†	184	Library of the Serail, 34	Istanbul	Turkey	INTF
1287	13th	Gospels, Acts, General Epistles, Pauline Epistles	450	Owner unknown			
1288	12th/13th	Gospels	325	Vernadsky National Library, Ф. 301 (КДА) 25л	Kiev	Ukraine	INTF
1289	13th	Gospels	212	Newberry Library, Greek MS 2	Chicago	USA	INTF
1290	15th	Gospels†	267	University of Chicago Library, Ms. 46	Chicago	USA	TUOCL
1291	12th	Gospels†	260	National Library, Supplement Grec 1128	Paris	France	BnF, INTF
1292	13th	Gospels, Acts, General Epistles, Pauline Epistles	239	National Library, Supplement Grec 1224	Paris	France	BnF, INTF
1293	11th	Gospels†	270	National Library, Supplement Grec 1225	Paris	France	BnF, INTF
1294	13th	Gospels	249	National Library, Supplement Grec 1226	Paris	France	BnF
1295	9th	Gospels†	171	National Library, Supplement Grec 1257	Paris	France	BnF, INTF
1296	13th	Gospels	249	National Library, Supplement Grec 1258	Paris	France	BnF
1297	1290	Gospels, Acts, General Epistles, Pauline Epistles	319	National Library, Supplement Grec 1259	Paris	France	BnF, INTF
1298	13th	Gospels	232	National Library, Supplement Grec 1260	Paris	France	BnF
1299	13th	Gospels	309	National Library, Supplement Grec 1261	Paris	France	BnF
1300	11th	Gospels†	182	National Library, Supplement Grec 1265	Paris	France	BnF, INTF

[top]

== See also ==
- List of New Testament papyri
- List of New Testament uncials
- List of New Testament minuscules (1–1000)
- List of New Testament minuscules (1001–2000)
- List of New Testament minuscules (2001–)
- List of New Testament minuscules ordered by Location/Institution
- List of New Testament lectionaries

== Bibliography ==
- Aland, Kurt; M. Welte; B. Köster; K. Junack (1994). Kurzgefasste Liste der griechischen Handschriften des Neues Testaments. Berlin, New York: Walter de Gruyter. p. 95. ISBN 3-11-011986-2.
- "Liste Handschriften". Münster: Institute for New Testament Textual Research.
