= Minuscule 877 =

- New Testament manuscript
- Name: Cod. Vaticanus 2290
- Text: Gospels
- Date: 12th century
- Script: Greek
- Now at: Vatican Library
- Size: 26.6 cm by 21 cm
- Type: Byzantine
- Category: none
- Note: marginalia

Minuscule 877 (in the Gregory-Aland numbering), ε204 (von Soden), is a 12th-century Greek minuscule manuscript of the New Testament on parchment. It has complex contents.

== Description ==
The codex contains the text of the four Gospels on 218 parchment leaves (size 26.6 cm by 21 cm). The text is written in two columns per page, 25 lines per page. According to F. H. A. Scrivener it is "a splendid codex".

The text is divided according to the κεφαλαια (chapters), whose numbers are given at the margin, and their τιτλοι (titles of chapters) at the top of the pages. There is also a division according to the Ammonian Sections, with references to the Eusebian Canons.

It contains the Epistula ad Carpianum, Eusebian Canon tables, prolegomena, tables of κεφαλαια (tables of contents) before each Gospel, and number of verses at the end of each Gospel. According to Hermann von Soden it has lectionary markings.

== Text ==
The Greek text of the codex is a representative of the Byzantine text-type. Hermann von Soden classified it to the textual family K^{x}. Kurt Aland did not place it in any Category. According to the Claremont Profile Method it represents textual family K^{x} in Luke 1 and Luke 20. In Luke 10 no profile was made. It creates textual pair with 439.

== History ==
The manuscript is dated by the colophon to the year 1197. It was written by a monk, Athanasius, at the suggestion of Johannicius.

The manuscript was added to the list of New Testament manuscripts by Scrivener (694^{e}), Gregory (877^{e}). Gregory saw it in 1886.

Currently the manuscript is housed at the Vatican Library (Gr. 2290), in Rome.

== See also ==
- List of New Testament minuscules
- Biblical manuscript
- Textual criticism
- Minuscule 875
