= Minuscule 494 =

- New Testament manuscript
- Text: Gospels †
- Date: 14th-century
- Script: Greek
- Now at: British Library
- Cite: 1884
- Size: 20.3 cm by 15.2 cm
- Type: Byzantine text-type/mixed
- Category: V
- Note: marginalia

Minuscule 494 (in the Gregory-Aland numbering), ε 437 (in the Soden numbering), is a Greek minuscule manuscript of the New Testament, on parchment. Palaeographically it has been assigned to the 14th-century. The manuscript is lacunose, full marginalia. The manuscript was adapted to the liturgical use.

== Description ==
The codex contains the text of the four Gospels on 222 parchment leaves (size 20.3 cm by 15.2 cm) with some lacunae (Mark 6:56-7:17; 10:8-25; Luke 8:37-51; 11:17-32; 20:20-21:2; 24:26-53; John 1:1-22). The text is written in one column per page, 23 lines per page. It has itacistic errors.

The text is divided according to the κεφαλαια (chapters), whose numbers are given at the margin, and their τιτλοι (titles of chapters) at the top of the pages. There is also a division according to the smaller Ammonian Sections, with references to the Eusebian Canons.

It contains prolegomena, tables of the κεφαλαια (tables of contents) before each Gospel, lectionary markings at the margin (for liturgical use), incipits, Synaxarion (liturgical book), and subscriptions at the end of each Gospel. It has marginal notes.

== Text ==
The Greek text of the codex is a representative of the Byzantine text-type. Aland placed it in Category V. Hermann von Soden included it to the textual family K^{x}. According to the Claremont Profile Method it creates cluster with 343 in Luke 1 and Luke 10. In Luke 20 it has mixed Byzantine text (Luke 20 is a fragmentary).

It has some unique readings and many corrections.

== History ==
The manuscript was bought for the British Museum from J. Greville Chester in 1884. It was added to the list of New Testament manuscripts by Gregory.

The manuscript is not cited in critical editions of the Greek New Testament.

It is currently housed at the British Library (Add MS 32341) in London.

== See also ==
- List of New Testament minuscules
- Biblical manuscript
- Textual criticism
