= Minuscule 797 =

- New Testament manuscript
- Text: Gospels
- Date: 14th century
- Script: Greek
- Now at: National Library of Greece
- Size: 18.5 cm by 13.5 cm
- Type: Byzantine text-type
- Category: V
- Note: –

Minuscule 797 (in the Gregory-Aland numbering), ε535 (von Soden), is a Greek minuscule manuscript of the New Testament written on paper. Palaeographically it has been assigned to the 14th century. The manuscript has complex contents.

== Description ==
The codex contains the text of the four Gospels, on 224 paper leaves (size 18.5 cm by 13.5 cm). The text of John 21:25 was supplied by a later hand.

The text is written in one column per page, 22 lines per page.

The text is divided according to the κεφαλαια (chapters), whose numbers are given at the margin, with their τιτλοι (titles) at the top of the pages. There is no another division.

It contains Argumentum, tables of the κεφαλαια, lectionary markings, incipits, αναγνωσεις (lessons), liturgical books Synaxarion and Menologion, and Verses in Mark. It contains subscriptions added by a later hand.

== Text ==
The Greek text of the codex is a representative of the Byzantine text-type. Hermann von Soden classified it to the textual family K^{x}. Aland placed it in Category V.

According to the Claremont Profile Method it represent the textual family K^{r} in Luke 1 and Luke 20. In Luke 10 no profile was made. It belongs to the textual subgroup 35.

The text of Pericope Adulterae (John 7:53-8:11) is marked by an obelus.

== History ==
According to C. R. Gregory the manuscript was written in the 14th century. The manuscript is currently dated by the INTF to the 14th century.

The manuscript was noticed in catalogue from 1876.

It was added to the list of New Testament manuscripts by Gregory (797). Gregory saw the manuscript in 1886.

The manuscript is now housed at the National Library of Greece (111) in Athens.

== See also ==
- List of New Testament minuscules
- Biblical manuscript
- Textual criticism
- Minuscule 796
