= Minuscule 785 =

- New Testament manuscript
- Text: Gospels
- Date: 11th century
- Script: Greek
- Now at: National Library of Greece
- Size: 19 cm by 15 cm
- Type: Byzantine text-type
- Category: V
- Note: –

Minuscule 785 (in the Gregory-Aland numbering), ε197 (von Soden), is a Greek minuscule manuscript of the New Testament written on parchment. Palaeographically it has been assigned to the 11th century. The manuscript has complex contents.

== Description ==
The codex contains the text of the four Gospels, on 230 parchment leaves (size 19 cm by 15 cm). The texts of Luke 22:29-23:17; 23:56-24:53; John 7:12-8:2; 9:19-21:25 were supplied by a later hand.

The text is written in one column per page, 21 lines per page.

The text is divided according to the κεφαλαια (chapters), whose numbers are given at the margin, with their τιτλοι (titles) at the top of the pages. There is also another division according to the smaller Ammonian Sections (in Mark 241 sections – the last in 16:20), but without a references to the Eusebian Canons.

It contains tables of the κεφαλαια, lectionary markings at the margin, liturgical books with hagiographies (Synaxarion and Menologion), subscriptions at the end of each Gospel, numbers of στιχοι, and pictures. The pictures have Latin subscriptions.

== Text ==
The Greek text of the codex is a representative of the Byzantine text-type. Hermann von Soden classified it to the textual family K^{x}. Aland placed it in Category V.

According to the Claremont Profile Method it represent the textual family K^{x} in Luke 1, Luke 10, and Luke 20.

== History ==
According to C. R. Gregory the manuscript was written in Calabria in the 11th century. The manuscript is currently dated by the INTF to the 11th century. The name of scribe was Sergius, a monk.

The manuscript was noticed in catalogue from 1876.

It was added to the list of New Testament manuscripts by Gregory (785). Gregory saw the manuscript in 1886.

The manuscript is now housed at the National Library of Greece (118) in Athens.

== See also ==
- List of New Testament minuscules
- Biblical manuscript
- Textual criticism
- Minuscule 784
