= Minuscule 768 =

- New Testament manuscript
- Text: Gospels †
- Date: 12th century
- Script: Greek
- Now at: National Library of Greece
- Size: 16 cm by 13 cm
- Type: Byzantine text-type
- Category: V
- Note: —

Minuscule 768 (in the Gregory-Aland numbering), ε480 (von Soden), is a Greek minuscule manuscript of the New Testament written on parchment. Palaeographically it has been assigned to the 12th century. The manuscript has no complex contents. Scrivener labelled it as 859^{e}.

== Description ==
The codex contains the text of the four Gospels, on 222 parchment leaves (size 16 cm by 13 cm), with one lacuna. The text is written in one column per page, 16-24 lines per page. It lacks text of Matthew 1:1-9:15. The text of Matthew 3:6-9:15 was supplied by the 15th century hand, the text of Matthew 1:1-2:25 by the 16th century hand on paper.

The text is divided according to the κεφαλαια (chapters), whose numbers are given at the margin, with their τιτλοι (titles) at the top of the pages.

It contains tables of the κεφαλαια (tables of contents) before each Gospel. Lectionary markings at the margin for liturgical use, incipits, αναγνωσεις (lessons), subscriptions at the end of each Gospel, and στιχοι were added by a later hand.

== Text ==
The Greek text of the codex is a representative of the Byzantine text-type. Hermann von Soden classified it to the textual family K^{x}. Aland placed it in Category V.

According to the Claremont Profile Method it represents textual family K^{x} in Luke 1 and Luke 20. In Luke 10 no profile was made.

It lacks the Pericope Adulterae (John 7:53-8:11).

== History ==
F. H. A. Scrivener dated the manuscript to the 14th century; C. R. Gregory dated the manuscript to the 12th century. The manuscript is currently dated by the INTF to the 12th century.

The manuscript was the first time noticed in catalogue from 1876.

It was added to the list of New Testament manuscripts by Scrivener (859) and Gregory (768). Gregory saw the manuscript in 1886.

The manuscript is now housed at the National Library of Greece (161) in Athens.

== See also ==
- List of New Testament minuscules
- Biblical manuscript
- Textual criticism
- Minuscule 766
