= Minuscule 143 =

Greek minuscule manuscript of the New Testament

- New Testament manuscript
- Text: Gospels
- Date: 11th century
- Script: Greek
- Now at: Vatican Library
- Size: 32 cm by 24.5 cm
- Type: Byzantine text-type
- Category: V
- Note: Marginalia

Minuscule 143 (in the Gregory-Aland numbering), A ^{125} (Soden), is a Greek minuscule manuscript of the New Testament, on parchment leaves. Paleographically it has been assigned to the 11th century. It has marginalia.

== Description ==
The codex contains the text of the four Gospels on 275 thick parchment leaves (size 32 cm by 24.5 cm). The text is written in one column per page, 24 lines per page. Size of the text 19 cm by 10.5 cm. The large initial letters in gold.

The text is divided according to the κεφαλαια (chapters), whose numbers are given at the margin, and their τιτλοι (titles of chapters) at the top of the pages. There is also a division according to the Ammonian Sections, with references to the Eusebian Canons (written below Ammonian Section numbers).

It contains the tables of the κεφαλαια (tables of contents) before each Gospel, and pictures. It contains a marginal commentary (Victor's on Mark).

== Text ==
The Greek text of the codex is a representative of the Byzantine text-type. Aland placed it in Category V.

According to the Claremont Profile Method it represents textual family K^{x} in Luke 1, Luke 10, and Luke 20. It belongs to the textual cluster Ω.

== History ==
On the first leaf is read, it was presented to Paul IV, a Pope (1555–1559).

It was examined by Birch (about 1782) and Scholz. C. R. Gregory saw the manuscript in 1886.

It is currently housed at the Vatican Library (Vat. gr. 1229), at Rome.

== See also ==
- List of New Testament minuscules
- Biblical manuscript
- Textual criticism
