= Minuscule 530 =

- New Testament manuscript
- Text: Gospels †
- Date: 11th century
- Script: Greek
- Now at: Bodleian Library
- Size: 15.5 cm by 11.5 cm
- Type: Byzantine text-type
- Category: V
- Note: marginalia

Minuscule 530 (in the Gregory-Aland numbering), ε 151 (in Soden's numbering), is a Greek minuscule manuscript of the New Testament, on a parchment. Palaeographically it has been assigned to the 11th century. It has marginalia and was adapted for liturgical use.

Scrivener labeled it by number 485.

== Description ==
The codex contains a complete text of the four Gospels on 303 parchment leaves (size 15.5 cm by 11.5 cm) with some lacunae (Mark 14:69-15:10; John 20:10-23; 21:3-24). It has some foreign matter.

It is written in one column per page, 20 lines per page.

The text is divided according to the κεφαλαια (chapters), whose numbers are given at the margin, with their τιτλοι (titles of chapters) at the top of the pages. There is also a division according to the smaller Ammonian Sections (in Mark 247 Sections - the last section in 16:5), but with only a few references to the Eusebian Canons.

The tables of the κεφαλαια (tables of contents) are placed before each Gospel, lectionary markings at the margin (added by later hand), incipits, and subscriptions at the end of each Gospel.

== Text ==
The Greek text of the codex is a representative of the Byzantine text-type. Hermann von Soden classified it to the textual family K^{x}. Aland placed it in Category V.

According to the Claremont Profile Method it represents the textual family K^{x} in Luke 1 and Luke 20; in Luke 10 no profile was made.

== History ==
The manuscript is dated by the INTF on the palaeographical ground to the 11th century.

The manuscript was examined by Burgon.

The manuscript was added to the list of New Testament minuscule manuscripts by F. H. A. Scrivener (485) and C. R. Gregory (530). Gregory saw it in 1883.

It is currently housed at the Bodleian Library (MS. Rawl. G. 3) in Oxford.

== See also ==
- List of New Testament minuscules
- Biblical manuscript
- Textual criticism
