= Minuscule 137 =

- New Testament manuscript
- Name: Codex Vaticanus 756
- Text: Gospels
- Date: 12th century
- Script: Greek
- Now at: Vatican Library
- Size: 28.6 cm by 21.5 cm
- Type: Byzantine text-type
- Category: V
- Note: marginalia

Minuscule 137 (in the Gregory-Aland numbering), A^{153} (Soden), is a Greek minuscule manuscript of the New Testament, on parchment leaves. Palaeographically it has been assigned to the 12th century. It has marginalia.

== Description ==
The codex contains the text of the four Gospels on 300 thick parchment leaves (size 28.6 cm by 21.5 cm), with a commentary. The text is written in one column per page, 19 lines per page (size of column 14.5 by 11.8 cm).

The text is divided according to the κεφαλαια (chapters), whose numbers are given at the margin, and their τιτλοι (titles of chapters) at the top of the pages. There is also another division according to the smaller Ammonian Sections (Mark 233 – 16:8; in a commentary 234 – 16:9). There are no references to the Eusebian Canons.

It contains tables of the κεφαλαια (tables of contents) before each Gospel, synaxaria, Menologion, and pictures. Victor's commentary to Mark appears.

== Text ==
The Greek text of the codex is a representative of the Byzantine text-type. Aland placed it in Category V.

According to the Claremont Profile Method it represents textual family K^{x} in Luke 1 and Luke 10. In Luke 20 it has a mixture of the Byzantine text-types. It creates textual cluster 137.

== History ==
At the end we read: κσ φραγκισκος ακκιδας ευγενες κολασσευς... ρωμη ηγαγε το παρον βιβλιον ετει απο αδαμ ζφω [A.D. 1583], μηνι ιουλιω, ι̅ν̅δ̅. ι̅α̅. This means the manuscript was brought to Rome in 1583.

It was partially examined by Birch (about 1782). C. R. Gregory saw the manuscript in 1886.

It is currently housed at the Vatican Library (Vat. gr. 756), at Rome.

== See also ==
- List of New Testament minuscules
- Biblical manuscript
- Textual criticism
