= Minuscule 784 =

- New Testament manuscript
- Text: Gospels †
- Date: 14th century
- Script: Greek
- Now at: National Library of Greece
- Size: 22 cm by 14.5 cm
- Type: Byzantine text-type
- Category: V
- Note: –

Minuscule 784 (in the Gregory-Aland numbering), ε467 (von Soden), is a Greek minuscule manuscript of the New Testament written on paper. Palaeographically it has been assigned to the 14th century. The manuscript has no complex contents.

== Description ==
The codex contains the text of the four Gospels, on 161 paper leaves (size 22 cm by 14.5 cm), with some lacunae. It lacks texts of Matthew 1:1-5:3; Mark 1:1-16; Luke 1:1-19.

The text is written in one column per page, 27-28 lines per page.

The text is divided according to the κεφαλαια (chapters), whose numbers are given at the margin, with their τιτλοι (titles) at the top of the pages. There is also another division according to the smaller Ammonian Sections (only in Mark), but without references to the Eusebian Canons.

It contains lectionary markings and inartistic pictures.

== Text ==
The Greek text of the codex is a representative of the Byzantine text-type. Hermann von Soden classified it to the textual family K^{x}. Aland placed it in Category V.

According to the Claremont Profile Method it represent the textual family K^{x} in Luke 1, Luke 10, and Luke 20.

In John 8:6 it has unusual reading εγραψεν εις την γην ει τις ουχ ημαρτεν βαλετω λιθον επ αυτην οι δε ακουσαντες.

== History ==
Gregory dated the manuscript to the 14th century. The manuscript is currently dated by the INTF to the 14th century.

Formerly it was housed in the monastery μεγαλων πυλων 20. The manuscript was noticed in catalogue from 1876.

It was added to the list of New Testament manuscripts by Gregory (784). Gregory saw the manuscript in 1886.

The manuscript is now housed at the National Library of Greece (87) in Athens.

== See also ==
- List of New Testament minuscules
- Biblical manuscript
- Textual criticism
- Minuscule 783
