= Minuscule 795 =

- New Testament manuscript
- Text: Gospels
- Date: 14th century
- Script: Greek
- Now at: National Library of Greece
- Size: 14.8 cm by 10.5 cm
- Type: Byzantine text-type
- Category: none
- Note: –

Minuscule 795 (in the Gregory-Aland numbering), ε533 (von Soden), is a Greek minuscule manuscript of the New Testament written on paper. Palaeographically it has been assigned to the 14th century. The manuscript has no complex contents.

== Description ==
The codex contains the text of the four Gospels, on 324 paper leaves (size 14.8 cm by 10.5 cm), with only one lacuna (Matthew 32:1-24:3).

The text is written in one column per page, 18 lines per page.

The text is divided according to the κεφαλαια (chapters), whose numbers are given at the margin, with their τιτλοι (titles) at the top of the pages. There is also another division according to the smaller Ammonian Sections (in Mark 234 - 16:9). There is no references to the Eusebian Canons.

It contains Argumentum, tables of the κεφαλαια (tables of contents) before each Gospel, lectionary markings at the margin, incipits, liturgical books Synaxarion and Menologion, subscriptions at the end of each Gospel, and στιχοι.

== Text ==
The Greek text of the codex is a representative of the Byzantine text-type. Hermann von Soden classified it to the textual family K^{x}. Aland did not place it in any Category.

According to the Claremont Profile Method it represent the textual family K^{x} in Luke 1 and Luke 20. In Luke 10 no profile was made.

== History ==
According to Gregory the manuscript was written in the 14th century. The manuscript is currently dated by the INTF to the 14th century.

Formerly it was housed in the monastery μεγαλων πυλων 150. The manuscript was noticed in catalogue from 1876.

It was added to the list of New Testament manuscripts by Gregory (795). Gregory saw the manuscript in 1886.

The manuscript is now housed at the National Library of Greece (109) in Athens.

== See also ==
- List of New Testament minuscules
- Biblical manuscript
- Textual criticism
- Minuscule 794
