= Minuscule 941 =

- New Testament manuscript
- Text: Gospels, Acts, Paul
- Date: 13th/14th-century
- Script: Greek
- Now at: Dionysiou monastery
- Size: 15.5 cm by 12.3 cm
- Type: Byzantine
- Category: none

Minuscule 941 (in the Gregory-Aland numbering), δ 369 von Soden), is a 13th or 14th-century Greek minuscule manuscript of the New Testament on parchment. The manuscript has survived in complete condition.

== Description ==
The codex contains the text of the four Gospels, Book of Acts, Catholic epistles, Pauline Epistles, and Book of Psalms, on 301 parchment leaves (size 15.5 cm by 12.3 cm). The text is written in one column per page, 33 lines per page, in very small minuscule letters. The leaves are arranged in sedez.

It contains Epistula ad Carpianum, Eusebian Canon tables, and liturgical books with hagiographies: Synaxarion and Menologion, at the end of the manuscript. According to Hermann von Soden it contains lectionary markings at the margin and pictures.

== Text ==
The Greek text of the codex is a representative of the Byzantine. Kurt Aland did not place it in any Category. According to the Claremont Profile Method it represents textual Family K^{x} in Luke 1. In Luke 10 and Luke 20 the manuscript was not examined because of illegible text.

== History ==
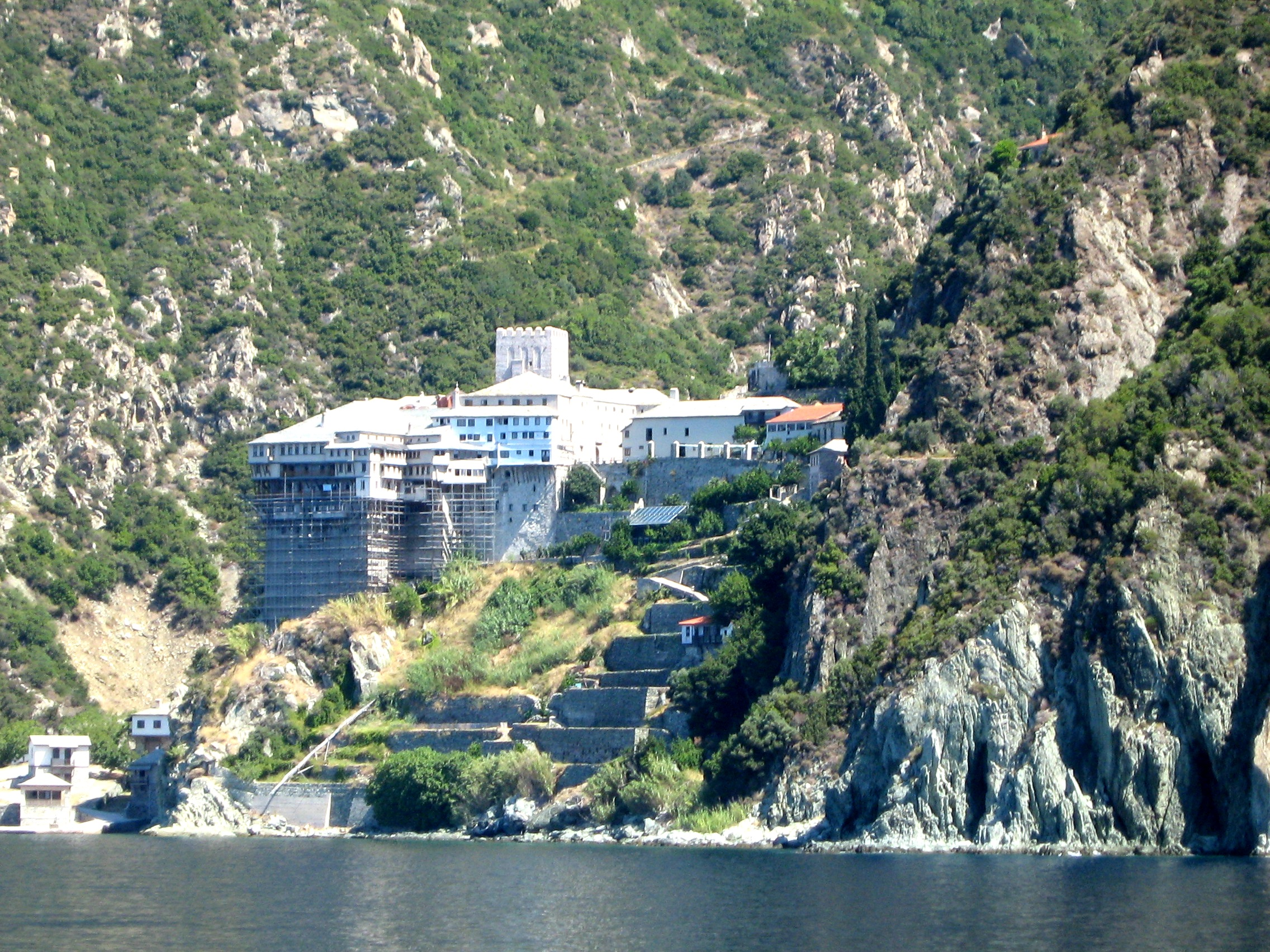
View on the monastery Dionysiou

The manuscript was dated by Gregory to the 13th century. Currently it is dated by the INTF to the 13th or 14th century.

The codex 941 was seen by Gregory at the Dionysiou monastery (33), in Mount Athos. Currently the manuscript is housed at the Dionysiou monastery (164 (33)) in Athos.

The manuscript was added to the list of New Testament manuscripts by C. R. Gregory (941^{e}). It was not on the Scrivener's list, but it was added to this list by Edward Miller in the 4th edition of A Plain Introduction to the Criticism of the New Testament.

It is not cited in critical editions of the Greek New Testament (UBS4, NA28).

== See also ==
- List of New Testament minuscules (1–1000)
- Biblical manuscript
- Textual criticism
