= Minuscule 208 =

- New Testament manuscript
- Text: Gospels
- Date: 11th century
- Script: Greek
- Now at: Biblioteca Marciana
- Size: 17.9 cm by 14.4 cm
- Type: Byzantine
- Category: V
- Note: marginalia

Minuscule 208 (in the Gregory-Aland numbering), ε 127 (Soden), is a Greek minuscule manuscript of the New Testament, on parchment. Paleographically it has been assigned to the 11th century. It has marginalia.

== Description ==
The codex contains a complete text of the four Gospels on 239 parchment leaves (size 17.9 cm by 14.4 cm). The text is written in one column per page, in 23 lines per page.

The text is divided according to the κεφαλαια (chapters), whose numbers are given at the margin, and their τιτλοι (titles of chapters) at the top. There is also another division according to the smaller Ammonian Sections (in Mark 233 sections, the last in 16:8), with references to the Eusebian Canons (written below Ammonian Section numbers).

It contains the Epistula ad Carpianum, the Eusebian tables, and tables of the κεφαλαια (tables of contents) before each Gospel.

The text of John 7:53-8:11 is placed at the end of the Gospel of John.

== Text ==
The Greek text of the codex is a representative of the Byzantine text-type. Hermann von Soden classified it to the textual family K^{x}. Aland placed it in Category V. According to the Claremont Profile Method it represents K^{x} in Luke 1 and Luke 20. In Luke 10 no profile was made.

== History ==
The manuscript was examined by Birch and Burgon. C. R. Gregory saw it in 1886.

It is currently housed at the Biblioteca Marciana (Gr. Z 9), at Venice.

== See also ==
- List of New Testament minuscules
- Biblical manuscript
- Textual criticism
