= Minuscule 89 =

- New Testament manuscript
- Name: Codex Gottingensis
- Text: Gospels
- Date: 1289/1290
- Script: Greek
- Now at: University of Göttingen
- Size: 25.5 cm by 17.6 cm
- Type: Byzantine text-type
- Category: V
- Note: unique readings full marginalia

Minuscule 89 (in the Gregory-Aland numbering), ε 184 (Soden), known as Codex Gottingensis, is a Greek minuscule manuscript of the New Testament, on parchment leaves. It is dated by a colophon to the year 1289 or 1290. It was adapted for liturgical use. It has complex contents and full marginalia.

== Description ==
The codex contains the text of the four Gospels, on 173 leaves (size 25.5 cm by 17.6 cm). The text is written in one column per page, 30 lines per page (size of text 19 cm by 11.7 cm).

The text is divided according to the κεφαλαια (chapters), whose numbers are given at the margin, and their τιτλοι (titles of chapters) at the top of the pages. There is also a division according to the Ammonian Sections (Matthew 359, Mark 241 – 16:20, Luke 342, John 239), with references to the Eusebian Canons.

It contains the Epistula ad Carpianum, the Eusebian Canon tables at the beginning, prolegomena, tables of the κεφαλαια (tables of contents) before each Gospel, lectionary markings at the margin (for liturgical use), and incipits.

It contains a large number of corrections, and some unique textual variants.

== Text ==
The Greek text of the codex is a representative of the Byzantine text-type. Hermann von Soden classified it to the textual family K^{x}. Aland placed it in Category V. According to the Claremont Profile Method it belongs to the textual family Family K^{x} in Luke 1, Luke 10, and Luke 20.

It has some unique readings.

== History ==
According to the colophon, it was written by scribe Christophorus in 1289 or 1290. Formerly date of writing was deciphered as 1006 (Scrivener, C. R. Gregory).

In 1728 the manuscript was presented by Damianos from Sinope to Jena. In 1786 in Gotha. It was collated by A. G. Gehl in 1739, and by Matthaei.

It is currently housed at the Göttingen State and University Library (Ms. II. A.7), at Göttingen.

== See also ==
- List of New Testament minuscules
- Biblical manuscript
- Textual criticism
