= Minuscule 790 =

- New Testament manuscript
- Text: Gospels †
- Date: 14th century
- Script: Greek
- Now at: National Library of Greece
- Size: 26.3 cm by 18 cm
- Type: Byzantine text-type
- Category: V
- Note: –

Minuscule 790 (in the Gregory-Aland numbering), ε613 (von Soden), is a Greek minuscule manuscript of the New Testament written on paper. Palaeographically it has been assigned to the 14th century. The manuscript has no complex contents. It contains liturgical books.

== Description ==
The codex contains the text of the four Gospels, on 240 paper leaves (size 26.3 cm by 18 cm), with some lacunae. It lack the texts of Matthew 1:1-13; 28:7-20; Mark 1:1-16; 16:5-20; Luke 1:1-17; 21:21-38.

The text is written in one column per page, 24 lines per page.

The text is divided according to the κεφαλαια (chapters), whose numbers are given at the margin, with their τιτλοι (titles) at the top of the pages. There is also another division according to the smaller Ammonian Sections, with a references to the Eusebian Canons (at the beginning).

It contains Prolegomena, Argumentum, tables of the κεφαλαια before each Gospel, lectionary markings at the margin, incipits, liturgical books with hagiographies Synaxarion and Menologion.

== Text ==
The Greek text of the codex is a representative of the Byzantine text-type. Hermann von Soden classified it to the textual family K^{x}. Aland placed it in Category V.

According to the Claremont Profile Method it represent the textual family K^{x} in Luke 1 and Luke 20. In Luke 10 it has mixed Byzantine text.

== History ==
According to Gregory the manuscript was written in the 14th century. The manuscript is currently dated by the INTF to the 14th century.

According to Hermann von Soden it was written in the West.

Formerly it was housed in the monastery μεγαλων πυλων 39. The manuscript was noticed in catalogue from 1876.

It was added to the list of New Testament manuscripts by Gregory (790). Gregory saw the manuscript in 1886.

The manuscript is now housed at the National Library of Greece (86) in Athens.

== See also ==
- List of New Testament minuscules
- Biblical manuscript
- Textual criticism
- Minuscule 789
