= Minuscule 260 =

- New Testament manuscript
- Text: Gospels
- Date: 13th century
- Script: Greek
- Now at: National Library of France
- Size: 30.5 cm by 22.4 cm
- Type: Byzantine text-type
- Category: V
- Hand: correctly written
- Note: marginalia

Minuscule 260 is a Greek minuscule manuscript of the New Testament, made of parchment. It is designated by the siglum 260 in the Gregory-Aland numbering of New Testament manuscripts, and ε 369 in the von Soden numbering of New Testament manuscripts.Using the study of comparaUsing the study of comparative writing styles (palaeography), it has been assigned to the 13th century. It has marginal notes.

== Description ==
The manuscript is a codex (precursor to the modern book format), containing the text of the four Gospels on 240 parchment leaves (sized 30.5 cm by 22.4 cm). The text is written in one column per page, in 24 lines per page.

The text is divided according to the chapters (known as κεφαλαια / kephalaia), whose numbers are given in the margin, and their titles (known as τιτλοι / titloi) written at the top of the pages. There is also a division according to the Ammonian Sections (241 in Mark, the last in 16:20), with references to the Eusebian Canons written below Ammonian Section numbers.

It contains Prolegomena, tables of contextns (also known as κεφαλαια / kephalaia) before each Gospel, and pictures. According to biblical scholar Frederick H. A. Scrivener, the manuscript is correctly written.

== Text ==
The Greek text of the codex is considered to be a representative of the Byzantine text-type. Textual critic Hermann von Soden classified it to the textual family K. According to the Claremont Profile Method (a specific analysis of textual data), it represents textual family Kx in Luke 1 and Luke 20.

Biblical scholar Kurt Aland placed it in Category V of his New Testament manuscript classification system. Category V manuscripts are described as "manuscripts with a purely or predominantly Byzantine text."

== History ==
The earliest history of the manuscript is unknown. It once belonged to "domini du Fresne" as codex 309. The manuscripts 260-469 were added to the list of New Testament manuscripts by biblical scholar Johann M. A. Scholz (1794-1852). It was examined and described by Scholz and scholar Paulin Martin. Biblical scholar Caspar René Gregory saw the manuscript in 1884.

It is currently dated by the INTF to the 13th century. The manuscript is presently housed at the National Library of France (shelf number Gr. 51) in Paris.

== See also ==
- Minuscule 261
- Minuscule 259
- List of New Testament minuscules
- Biblical manuscript
- Textual criticism

== Exteranl links ==
- Digital Images (microfilm) of Minuscule 260 online at the National Library of France BnF Viewer
