= Minuscule 672 =

- New Testament manuscript
- Text: Gospels †
- Date: 11th century
- Script: Greek
- Now at: Cambridge University Library
- Size: 14 cm by 10.7 cm
- Type: Byzantine text-type
- Category: V

Minuscule 672 (in the Gregory-Aland numbering), ε 156 (von Soden), is a Greek minuscule manuscript of the New Testament, on parchment. Palaeographically it has been assigned to the 11th century. The manuscript is a very lacunose. Scrivener labelled it by 618^{e}.

== Description ==
The codex contains the text of the four Gospels, on 278 parchment leaves (size 14 cm by 10.7 cm), with numerous lacunae (Matthew 28:1-20; Mark 15:29-16; 20 Luke 1:1-3:23). Text of Luke 24:46-53 was supplied by a later hand. The text is written in one column per page, 19-20 lines per page. It was written by several hands.

The tables of the κεφαλαια are placed before every Gospel. The text is divided according to the κεφαλαια (chapters) with the τιτλοι (titles) at the top. There is also a division according to the Ammonian Sections, with references to the Eusebian Canons (partially). It contains a lectionary markings, incipits, Synaxarion, Menologion, and pictures.

The Old Testament quotations are marked on the margin. N ephelkystikon is rare.

== Text ==
The Greek text of the codex is a representative of the Byzantine text-type. Hermann von Soden classified it to the textual family K^{x}. Kurt Aland placed it in Category V.

According to the Wisse's Profile Method it represents family K^{x} in Luke 10 and Luke 20; in Luke 1 the manuscript is defective.

== History ==
Scrivener and Gregory dated it to the 11th century. Currently the manuscript is dated by the INTF to the 11th century.

On the last leaf is date of the owner – 1729.

The manuscript was bought in 1870. It was added to the list of New Testament manuscripts by Scrivener and Gregory. Gregory saw it in 1883. It was examined by Hort and Brandshaw.

Actually the manuscript is housed at the Cambridge University Library (MS Add.720) in Cambridge.

== See also ==
- List of New Testament minuscules
- Biblical manuscript
- Textual criticism
