= Minuscule 275 =

- New Testament manuscript
- Text: Gospels
- Date: 12th century
- Script: Greek
- Now at: Bibliothèque nationale de France
- Size: 25.6 cm by 20 cm
- Type: Byzantine text-type
- Category: V
- Note: Family K^{x} marginalia

Minuscule 275 (in the Gregory-Aland numbering), ε 292 (Soden), is a Greek minuscule manuscript of the New Testament, on parchment. Paleographically it has been assigned to the 12th century. It has marginalia.

== Description ==
The codex contains the text of the four Gospels on 230 parchment leaves (25.6 cm by 20 cm). The text is written in one column per page, in 24 lines per page.

The text is divided according to the κεφαλαια (chapters), whose numbers are given at the margin, and their τιτλοι (titles of chapters) at the top. There is also a division according to the Ammonian Sections (in Mark 241 sections, the last in 16:20), with references to the Eusebian Canons (written below Ammonian Section numbers).

It contains Prolegomena, tables of the κεφαλαια (tables of contents) before each Gospel, and portions of synaxaria. It uses silver ink.

== Text ==
The Greek text of the codex is a representative of the Byzantine text-type. Hermann von Soden included it to the textual family K^{x}. Aland placed it in Category V.

According to the Claremont Profile Method it represents the textual family K^{x} in Luke 1 and Luke 20. In Luke 10 no profile was made.

== History ==
The manuscript was added to the list of New Testament manuscripts by Scholz (1794-1852). It was examined and described by Paulin Martin. C. R. Gregory saw the manuscript in 1885.

The manuscript is currently housed at the Bibliothèque nationale de France (Gr. 80) at Paris.

== See also ==
- List of New Testament minuscules
- Biblical manuscript
- Textual criticism
