= Minuscule 529 =

- New Testament manuscript
- Text: Gospels
- Date: 12th century
- Script: Greek
- Now at: Bodleian Library
- Size: 14 cm by 10 cm
- Type: Byzantine text-type
- Category: V
- Note: marginalia

Minuscule 529 (in the Gregory-Aland numbering), ε 149 (in Soden's numbering), is a Greek minuscule manuscript of the New Testament, on a parchment. Palaeographically it has been assigned to the 12th century. Scrivener labeled it by number 484. It was adapted for liturgical use.

== Description ==
The codex contains a complete text of the four Gospels on 362 parchment leaves (size 14 cm by 10 cm). It is written in one column per page, 20 lines per page.

The text is divided according to the κεφαλαια (chapters), whose numbers of are given at the margin, with their τιτλοι (titles of chapters) at the top of the pages. There is also a division according to the smaller Ammonian Sections, but there is no references to the Eusebian Canons).

It contains prolegomena, the tables of the κεφαλαια (tables of contents) are placed before each Gospel, lectionary markings at the margin (for liturgical use), incipits, Synaxarion, Menologion, and subscriptions at the end of each Gospel.

== Text ==
The Greek text of the codex is a representative of the Byzantine text-type. Hermann von Soden classified it to the textual family K^{x}. Aland placed it in Category V.

According to the Claremont Profile Method it represents the textual family K^{x} in Luke 1 and Luke 10; in Luke 20 it has mixed Byzantine text. It creates textual pair with minuscule 2694.

== History ==
The manuscript once belonged to Humphrey Wanley (1672–1726). In 1776 the manuscript was bought by Samuel Smalbroke from Lichfield and it was presented by him to the Bodleian Library in 1800.

The manuscript was added to the list of New Testament minuscule manuscripts by F. H. A. Scrivener (484) and C. R. Gregory (529). Gregory saw it in 1883.

It is currently housed at the Bodleian Library (MS. Auct. D. inf. 2. 21) in Oxford.

== See also ==
- List of New Testament minuscules
- Biblical manuscript
- Textual criticism
