= Minuscule 298 =

- New Testament manuscript
- Text: Gospels
- Date: 12th century
- Script: Greek
- Now at: Bibliothèque nationale de France
- Size: 19 cm by 13.9 cm
- Type: Byzantine
- Category: none
- Note: marginalia

Minuscule 298 (in the Gregory-Aland numbering), ε 1201 (Soden), is a Greek minuscule manuscript of the New Testament, on parchment. Paleographically it has been assigned to the 12th century. It has marginalia.

== Description ==
The codex contains a complete text of the four Gospels on 222 parchment leaves (19 cm by 13.9 cm). The text is written in one column per page, in 27-28 lines per page.

The text is divided according to the κεφαλαια (chapters), whose numbers are given at the margin, and their τιτλοι (titles of chapters) at the top of the pages. There is also another division according to the smaller Ammonian Sections (in Mark 231 – 16:2), whose numbers are given at the margin, (without references to the Eusebian Canons).

It contains tables of the κεφαλαια (tables of contents) before each Gospel, lectionary markings at the margin (for liturgical reading), incipits, αναγνωσεις (lessons) at the margin, Synaxarion, Menologion, and pictures.

== Text ==
The Greek text of the codex is a representative of the Byzantine text-type. Hermann von Soden included it to the textual family K^{x}. Aland did not place it in any Category. According to the Claremont Profile Method it represents the textual family K^{x} in Luke 1, Luke 10, and Luke 20. It belongs to the cluster 1053.

== History ==
Formerly the manuscript belonged to the Jesuit's public library in Lyon.

It was added to the list of New Testament manuscripts by Scholz (1794–1852). It was examined and described by Paulin Martin. C. R. Gregory saw it in 1885.

The manuscript is currently housed at the Bibliothèque nationale de France (Suppl. Gr. 175) at Paris.

== See also ==
- List of New Testament minuscules
- Biblical manuscript
- Textual criticism
