= Minuscule 796 =

- New Testament manuscript
- Text: Gospels, Acts, Epistles †
- Date: 11th century
- Script: Greek
- Now at: National Library of Greece
- Size: 15.5 cm by 10.5 cm
- Type: Byzantine text-type
- Category: none
- Note: –

Minuscule 796 (in the Gregory-Aland numbering), δ161 (von Soden), is a Greek minuscule manuscript of the New Testament written on parchment. Palaeographically it has been assigned to the 11th century. The manuscript has no complex contents. Formerly it was designated by 796^{e}, 263^{a}, and 312^{p}.

== Description ==
The codex contains the text of the New Testament except Apocalypse, on 319 parchment leaves (size 15.5 cm by 10.5 cm), with some lacunae. It lacks texts of 2 Peter 3:14-1 John 2. Text of Hebrews 13:1-25 was supplied by a later hand on paper.

The order of books: Gospels, Acts, Catholic epistles, and Pauline epistles.

The text is written in one column per page, 34 lines per page.

The text is divided according to the κεφαλαια (chapters), whose numbers are given at the margin, with their τιτλοι (titles) at the top of the pages. There is also another division according to the smaller Ammonian Sections (in Mark 240 sections, the last in 16:9). There is no references to the Eusebian Canons.

It contains Eusebian tables, tables of the κεφαλαια, lectionary markings, incipits, Synaxarion (added by the 15th century hand), and pictures. It contains subscriptions added by a later hand.

== Text ==
The Greek text of the codex is a representative of the Byzantine text-type. Hermann von Soden classified it to the textual family I^{κ}. Aland did not place it in any Category.

According to the Claremont Profile Method it represent the textual family K^{x} in Luke 1, Luke 10, and Luke 20.

== History ==
According to Gregory the manuscript was written in the 11th century. The manuscript is currently dated by the INTF to the 11th century.

The manuscript was noticed in catalogue from 1876.

It was added to the list of New Testament manuscripts by Gregory (796). Gregory saw the manuscript in 1886.

The manuscript is now housed at the National Library of Greece (160) in Athens.

== See also ==
- List of New Testament minuscules
- Biblical manuscript
- Textual criticism
- Minuscule 795
