= Minuscule 282 =

- New Testament manuscript
- Text: Gospels
- Date: 1176
- Script: Greek
- Now at: Bibliothèque nationale de France
- Size: 17.8 cm by 12.8 cm
- Type: Byzantine text-type
- Category: V
- Note: full marginalia

Minuscule 282 (in the Gregory-Aland numbering), ε 280 (Soden), is a Greek minuscule manuscript of the New Testament, on parchment. It is dated by a colophon to the year 1176. It has full marginalia.

== Description ==
The codex contains the text of the four Gospels on 150 parchment leaves (17.8 cm by 12.8 cm). The text is written in two columns per page, in 33-34 lines per page.

The text is divided according to the κεφαλαια (chapters), whose numbers are given at the margin, and their τιτλοι (titles of chapters) at the top of the pages. There is also another division according to the smaller Ammonian Sections (in Mark 235 Sections, the last in 16:12) was added by a later hand, but without references to the Eusebian Canons (written below Ammonian Section numbers).

It contains the Eusebian Canon tables, lectionary markings at the margin for liturgical use, and subscriptions at the end of each Gospel.

== Text ==
The Greek text of the codex is a representative of the Byzantine text-type. Hermann von Soden classified it to the textual family K^{x}. Aland placed it in Category V.

According to the Claremont Profile Method it represents textual family K^{x} in Luke 10 and Luke 20. In Luke 1 it has a mixture of the Byzantine text-families and creates pair with 1714.

== History ==
The manuscript was added to the list of New Testament manuscripts by Scholz (1794-1852). It was examined and described by Paulin Martin and Henri Omont. C. R. Gregory saw it in 1885.

The manuscript is currently housed at the Bibliothèque nationale de France (Gr. 90) at Paris.

== See also ==
- List of New Testament minuscules
- Biblical manuscript
- Textual criticism
