= Minuscule 293 =

- New Testament manuscript
- Text: Gospels †
- Date: 1262
- Script: Greek
- Now at: Bibliothèque nationale de France
- Size: 13.3 cm by 8.9 cm
- Type: Byzantine text-type
- Category: V
- Note: marginalia

Minuscule 293 (in the Gregory-Aland numbering), ε 365 (Soden), is a Greek minuscule manuscript of the New Testament, on parchment. It is dated by a colophon to the year 1262. Scrivener wrongly deciphered this as November 1373. It has marginalia.

== Description ==
The codex contains almost complete text of the four Gospels on 340 parchment leaves (13.3 cm by 8.9 cm), with lacunae (Mark 1:1-3:8). The text is written in one column per page, in 19-23 lines per page, by several different hands. Mark 1:1-3:8 was supplied by a later hand.

The text is divided according to the κεφαλαια (chapters), whose numbers are given at the margin, and their τιτλοι (titles of chapters) at the top of the pages. There is also another division according to the Ammonian Sections (in Mark 241 - 16:20), but without references to the Eusebian Canons.

It contains Prolegomena, tables of the κεφαλαια (tables of contents) before each Gospel, Synaxarion, subscriptions at the end, numbers of στιχοι, and pictures. It is ornamented with silver.

It is a palimpsest. The lower text was written in uncial letters, in two columns. It was Evangelistarion-Lectionary, dated palaeographically to the 9th or 10th century. The upper text of the palimpsest is the text of minuscule 293.

== Text ==
The Greek text of the codex is a representative of the Byzantine text-type. Hermann von Soden classified it to the textual family K^{x}. Aland placed it in Category V.

According to the Claremont Profile Method it represents the textual group M1195 in Luke 1, Luke 10, and Luke 20, as a weak member.

== History ==
The manuscript was written by Manuel at the suggestion of Blasius, a monk. It was added to the list of New Testament manuscripts by Scholz (1794–1852). It was examined and described by Paulin Martin. C. R. Gregory saw it in 1885.

The manuscript is currently housed at the Bibliothèque nationale de France (Gr. 117) at Paris.

== See also ==
- List of New Testament minuscules
- Biblical manuscript
- Textual criticism
