= Minuscule 766 =

- New Testament manuscript
- Text: Gospels
- Date: 13th century
- Script: Greek
- Now at: National Library of Greece
- Size: 18.5 cm by 12.5 cm
- Type: Byzantine text-type
- Category: none
- Note: —

Minuscule 766 (in the Gregory-Aland numbering), ε479 (von Soden), is a Greek minuscule manuscript of the New Testament written on parchment. Palaeographically it has been assigned to the 13th century. The manuscript has complex contents. Scrivener labelled it as 857^{e}.

== Description ==
The codex contains the text of the four Gospels, on 316 parchment leaves (size 18.5 cm by 12.5 cm). The texts of Matthew 23:5-20; 28:5-9; John 18:15-21:25 were supplied by a later hand on paper. The text is written in one column per page, 13-20 lines per page. The large initial letters in red.

The text is divided according to the κεφαλαια (chapters), whose numbers are given at the margin, with their τιτλοι (titles of chapters) at the top of the pages. There is also another division according to the smaller Ammonian Sections (in Mark 234 sections, the last section in 16:9), but without references to the Eusebian Canons.

It contains lectionary markings at the margin for liturgical use.

== Text ==
The Greek text of the codex is a representative of the Byzantine text-type with some pre-Byzantine readings. Hermann von Soden classified it to the textual family I, which text was established by Pamphilius in Caesarea. Aland did not place it in any Category.

According to the Claremont Profile Method it represents textual family K^{x} in Luke 1 and Luke 20. In Luke 10 no profile was made. It belongs to the textual cluster 550.

In John 1:28 it has unique reading βηθαγαβρη.

== History ==
F. H. A. Scrivener dated the manuscript to the 14th century; C. R. Gregory dated the manuscript to the 14th century. The manuscript is currently dated by the INTF to the 13th century.

It was added to the list of New Testament manuscripts by Scrivener (857) and Gregory (766). Gregory saw the manuscript in 1886.

The manuscript is now housed at the National Library of Greece (159) in Athens.

== See also ==
- List of New Testament minuscules
- Biblical manuscript
- Textual criticism
- Minuscule 765
