= Minuscule 403 =

- New Testament manuscript
- Text: Gospels †
- Date: 13th century
- Script: Greek
- Now at: Biblioteca Nazionale Vittorio Emanuele III
- Size: 17.3 cm by 12.5 cm
- Type: Byzantine text-type
- Category: none
- Note: marginalia

Minuscule 403 (in the Gregory-Aland numbering), ε 320 (in Soden's numbering), is a Greek minuscule manuscript of the New Testament, on cotton paper. Palaeographically it has been assigned to the 13th century. It has marginalia.

== Description ==
The codex contains the text of the four Gospels on 212 paper leaves (17.3 cm by 12.5 cm) with numerous lacunae. It is written in one column per page, in 22 lines per page.

It contains Argumentum, tables of the κεφαλαια (tables of contents) before each Gospel, division according to the Ammonian Sections (in Mark 240 Sections, 16:19) (no references to the Eusebian Canons), lectionary markings at the margin, incipits, and Menologion.

Contents

Matthew 12:23-19:12; 19:18-28:20; Mark; Luke 1:1-5:21; 5:36—24:53; John 1:1-18:36.

== Text ==
The Greek text of the codex is a representative of the Byzantine text-type. Hermann von Soden classified it to the textual family K^{x}. Kurt Aland did not place it in any Category.

According to the Claremont Profile Method it represents textual family K^{x} in Luke 1 and Luke 20. In Luke 10 no profile was made.

== History ==
The manuscript was added to the list of New Testament manuscripts by Scholz (1794–1852). C. R. Gregory saw it in 1886.

The manuscript is currently housed at the Biblioteca Nazionale Vittorio Emanuele III (Ms. II. A. 4) in Naples.

== See also ==
- List of New Testament minuscules
- Biblical manuscript
- Textual criticism
