= Minuscule 414 =

- New Testament manuscript
- Text: Gospels
- Date: 14th century
- Script: Greek
- Now at: Biblioteca Marciana
- Size: 17.7 cm by 13 cm
- Type: Byzantine text-type
- Category: V
- Note: full marginalia

Minuscule 414 (in the Gregory-Aland numbering), ε 425 (in Soden's numbering), is a Greek minuscule manuscript of the New Testament, on parchment. Palaeographically it has been assigned to the 14th century. It has full marginalia.

== Description ==
The codex contains a complete text of the four Gospels on 225 parchment leaves (17.7 cm by 13 cm). The text is written in one column per page, in 26 lines per page.

The text is divided according to the κεφαλαια (chapters), whose numbers are given at the margin, and their τιτλοι (titles) at the top of the pages. There is also another division according to the smaller Ammonian Sections (in Mark 234 Sections, the last section in 16:9). References to the Eusebian Canons are absent.

It contains lectionary markings at the margin for liturgical reading, subscriptions at the end of each Gospel, Synaxarion, and Menologion.

== Text ==
The Greek text of the codex is a representative of the Byzantine text-type. Hermann von Soden classified it to the textual family K^{x}. Aland placed it in Category V. According to the Claremont Profile Method it represents textual cluster M349 in Luke 1, Luke 10, and Luke 20.

== History ==
The manuscript was written by Philip, a monk. Wiedmann and J. G. J. Braun collated portions of the manuscript for Scholz (1794-1852). The manuscript was added to the list of New Testament manuscripts by Scholz. C. R. Gregory saw it in 1886.

The manuscript is currently housed at the Biblioteca Marciana (Gr. I. 21) in Venice.

== See also ==
- List of New Testament minuscules
- Biblical manuscript
- Textual criticism
