= Minuscule 504 =

- New Testament manuscript
- Text: Gospels
- Date: 1033
- Script: Greek
- Now at: British Library
- Size: 20.5 cm by 16.5 cm
- Type: Byzantine text-type
- Category: V
- Note: full marginalia

Minuscule 504 (in the Gregory-Aland numbering), 585 (in the Scrivener's numbering), ε 111 (in the Soden numbering), is a Greek minuscule manuscript of the New Testament, on parchment, dated to the year 1033. The manuscript has complex context with full marginalia. It was adapted for liturgical use.

== Description ==
The codex contains the complete text of the four Gospels on 287 parchment leaves (size 20.5 cm by 16.5 cm). It is written in one column per page, 20 lines per page.

The text is divided according to the κεφαλαια (chapters), whose numbers are given at the margin, and the τιτλοι (titles of chapters) at the top of the pages. There is also a division according to the smaller Ammonian Sections (in Mark 240 sections – the last section in 16:19), with references to the Eusebian Canons.

It contains Prolegomena, tables of the κεφαλαια (tables of contents) are placed before every Gospel, lectionary markings at the margin (for liturgical use), liturgical books with hagiographies (Menologion, Synaxarion), and pictures (portraits of the four Evangelists).

It has many marginal corrections of the text.

== Text ==
The Greek text of the codex is a representative of the Byzantine text-type. Hermann von Soden classified it to the textual family K^{x}. Aland placed it in Category V. According to the Claremont Profile Method it represents the textual family K^{x} in Luke 1, Luke 10, and Luke 20.

== History ==
The manuscript is dated by a colophon to the year 1033.

The manuscript was written by Synesius, a priest. It was bought by H. Rodd in 1848.

The manuscript was added to the list of New Testament manuscripts by Scrivener (585) and C. R. Gregory (504). It was examined by Scrivener, Gregory (in 1883), and Kirsopp Lake.

It is currently housed at the British Library (Add MS 17470) in London.

== See also ==
- List of New Testament minuscules
- Biblical manuscript
- Textual criticism
