= Minuscule 405 =

- New Testament manuscript
- Text: Gospels
- Date: 10th century
- Script: Greek
- Now at: Biblioteca Marciana
- Size: 20.5 cm by 17 cm
- Type: Byzantine text-type
- Category: V
- Note: marginalia

Minuscule 405 (in the Gregory-Aland numbering), ε 1012 (in Soden's numbering), is a Greek minuscule manuscript of the New Testament, on parchment. Palaeographically it has been assigned to the 10th century. It has marginalia.

== Description ==
The codex contains the text of the four Gospels on 223 parchment leaves (20.5 cm by 17 cm) with some lacunae (Matthew 1:1-17; John 6:55-9:13; 11:30-45; 18:20-36). The text is written in one column per page, in 22 lines per page.

The text is divided according to the κεφαλαια (chapters), whose numbers are given at the margin, and their τιτλοι (titles) at the top of the pages. There is also a division according to the Ammonian Sections (Mark 233 Sections, the last in 16:8), with references to the Eusebian Canons (written below Ammonian Section numbers).

It contains the Epistula ad Carpianum, Eusebian Canon tables, tables of the κεφαλαια (tables of contents) before each Gospel, and subscriptions at the end of each Gospel.

== Text ==
The Greek text of the codex is a representative of the Byzantine text-type. Hermann von Soden classified it to the textual family K^{x}. Aland placed it in Category V. According to the Claremont Profile Method it has a mixture of the Byzantine text-families in Luke 1, in Luke 20 it represents K^{x}. In Luke 10 no profile was made.

== History ==
Formerly the manuscript was held in the monastery of St. Cosmae et Damiani in Brusa of Prussia. Wiedmann and Braun collated portions of the manuscript for Scholz. The manuscript was added to the list of New Testament manuscripts by Scholz (1794–1852). C. R. Gregory saw it in 1886.

The manuscript is currently housed at the Biblioteca Marciana (Gr. I. 10) in Venice.

== See also ==
- List of New Testament minuscules
- Biblical manuscript
- Textual criticism
