= Minuscule 396 =

- New Testament manuscript
- Name: Codex Ghigianus
- Text: Gospels †
- Date: 12th century
- Script: Greek
- Now at: Vatican Library
- Size: 22.4 cm by 16.5 cm
- Type: Byzantine text-type
- Category: V
- Note: marginalia

Minuscule 396 (in the Gregory-Aland numbering), ε 217 (Soden), is a Greek minuscule manuscript of the New Testament, on parchment. Paleographically it has been assigned to the 12th century. It has marginalia.

== Description ==
The codex contains the text of the four Gospels on 115 parchment leaves (22.4 cm by 16.5 cm) with one large lacunae (Matthew 1:1-23:27). It is written in one column per page, in 27 lines per page, in silver.

The text is divided according to numbers of the κεφαλαια (chapters), whose numbers are given at the margin, and the τιτλοι (titles) at the top of the pages. There is also a division according to the smaller Ammonian Sections (in Mark 240 Sections, the last in 16:9), with references to the Eusebian Canons (written below Ammonian Section numbers).

It contains Argumentum and the tables of the κεφαλαια (tables of contents) before each Gospel.

== Text ==
The Greek text of the codex is a representative of the Byzantine text-type. Hermann von Soden classified it to the textual family K^{x}. Aland placed it in Category V.

According to the Claremont Profile Method it represents textual family K^{x} in Luke 1 and Luke 20. In Luke 10 no profile was made. In Luke 1 it belongs to the cluster Ω.

== History ==
The manuscript was added to the list of New Testament manuscripts by Scholz (1794–1852).

It was examined by Scholz, Gebhardt (1882), and C. R. Gregory (1886).

The manuscript is currently housed at the Vatican Library (Chis. R IV 6 (gr. 6) in Rome.

== See also ==
- List of New Testament minuscules
- Biblical manuscript
- Textual criticism
