= Minuscule 283 =

- New Testament manuscript
- Text: Gospels †
- Date: 13th century
- Script: Greek
- Now at: Bibliothèque nationale de France
- Size: 19.1 cm by 12.7 cm
- Type: Byzantine text-type
- Category: V
- Note: marginalia

Minuscule 283 (in the Gregory-Aland numbering), ε 373 (Soden), is a Greek minuscule manuscript of the New Testament, on parchment. Palaeographically it has been assigned to the 13th century. It has marginalia.

== Description ==
The codex contains the text of the four Gospels on 159 parchment leaves (19.1 cm by 12.7 cm), with lacunae (Matthew 8:2-13:10; 19:7-21:2; 23:16-24:33; John 18:11-36). The text is written in one column per page, in 31-33 lines per page. The lacking parts of the manuscript were supplied in the 16th century on paper.

The text is divided according to the κεφαλαια (chapters) whose numbers are given at the margin of the text, and their τιτλοι (titles of chapters) at the top of the pages.

== Text ==
The Greek text of the codex is a representative of the Byzantine text-type. Hermann von Soden included it to the textual family K^{x}. Aland placed it in Category V.

According to the Claremont Profile Method it represents textual family K^{x} in Luke 20. In Luke 1 it has a mixture of the Byzantine text-families. In Luke 10 no profile was made.

== History ==
The manuscript was added to the list of New Testament manuscripts by Scholz (1794-1852). It was examined and described by Paulin Martin.

The manuscript is currently housed at the Bibliothèque nationale de France (Gr. 92) at Paris.

== See also ==
- List of New Testament minuscules
- Biblical manuscript
- Textual criticism
