= Minuscule 875 =

- New Testament manuscript
- Name: Cod. Vaticanus 2247
- Text: Gospels
- Date: 10th century
- Script: Greek
- Now at: Vatican Library
- Size: 20.1 cm by 14.9 cm
- Type: Byzantine
- Category: none
- Note: marginalia

Minuscule 875 (in the Gregory-Aland numbering), ε1004 (von Soden), is a 10th-century Greek minuscule manuscript of the New Testament on parchment. It has complex contents.

== Description ==
The codex contains the text of the four Gospels on 228 parchment leaves (size 20.1 cm by 14.9 cm). The text is written in one column per page, 23 lines per page. According to Scrivener it is a fine codex.

The text is divided according to the κεφαλαια (chapters), whose numbers are given at the margin, and their τιτλοι (titles of chapters) at the top of the pages. There is also a division according to the Ammonian Sections, with references to the Eusebian Canons.

It contains the Eusebian Canon tables, Prolegomena to the Gospel of John, tables of κεφαλαια (tables of contents) before each Gospel, pictures, lectionary markings at the margin (for liturgical reading), and Synaxarion.

Formerly it was known as Codex Columnensis 86.

== Text ==
The Greek text of the codex is a representative of the Byzantine text-type. Hermann von Soden classified it to the textual family K^{x}. Kurt Aland did not place it in any Category. According to the Claremont Profile Method it represents textual family K^{x} in Luke 1 and Luke 20. In Luke 10 no profile was made. It creates textual pair with 971.

== History ==
F. H. A. Scrivener and C. R. Gregory did not date the codex. Currently the manuscript is dated by the INTF to the 10th century.

It 1437 it was bought by Bartolomeo de Rimbertinis from Florence. In 1480 Nicolas de Cobitis gave it to the monastery in Florence. It once belonged to Giovanni Carlo de Salviatis.

The manuscript was added to the list of New Testament manuscripts by Scrivener (692^{e}), Gregory (875^{e}). Gregory saw it in 1886.

Currently the manuscript is housed at the Vatican Library (Gr. 2247), in Rome.

== See also ==
- List of New Testament minuscules
- Biblical manuscript
- Textual criticism
- Minuscule 873
