= Minuscule 142 =

Greek minuscule manuscript of the New Testament

- New Testament manuscript
- Text: New Testament (except Rev.)
- Date: 11th century
- Script: Greek
- Now at: Vatican Library
- Size: 12 cm by 8.3 cm
- Type: Byzantine text-type
- Category: V
- Hand: neatly written
- Note: marginalia

Minuscule 142 (in the Gregory-Aland numbering), δ 151 (Soden), is a Greek minuscule manuscript of the New Testament, on parchment leaves. Palaeographically it had been assigned to the 11th century.

== Description ==
The codex contains the text of the New Testament (except Book of Revelation) on 324 parchment leaves (size 12 cm by 8.3 cm). It containing Book of Psalms. The order of New Testament books: Gospels, Acts, Catholic epistles, Pauline epistles. It contains also Hymns and Psalms.

The text is divided according to the κεφαλαια (chapters), whose numbers are given at the margin, and their τιτλοι (titles of chapters) at the top of the pages.

It is neatly written (Scrivener) in one column per page, 30 lines per page. The letters are very small and beautiful. The ink is brown. It contains tables of the κεφαλαια (tables of contents) before each book, (synaxaria, Menologion added in 1447), subscriptions at the end of each book, pictures, and the Euthalian Apparatus. There are many marginal readings in another ancient hand.

== Text ==
The Greek text of the codex is a representative of the Byzantine text-type. Hermann von Soden classified it to the textual family K^{x}. Aland placed it in Category V. According to the Claremont Profile Method it belongs to K^{x} in Luke 10 and Luke 20. In Luke 1 it has mixed Byzantine text.

== History ==
The manuscript was examined by Birch (about 1782) and Scholz. C. R. Gregory saw it in 1886.

It is currently housed at the Vatican Library (Vat. gr. 1210), at Rome.

== See also ==
- List of New Testament minuscules
- Biblical manuscript
- Textual criticism
