= Minuscule 130 =

- New Testament manuscript
- Text: Gospels
- Date: 15th century
- Script: Greek- Latin
- Now at: Vatican Library
- Size: 28.4 cm by 21.1 cm
- Type: Byzantine text-type
- Category: none
- Hand: curious copy
- Note: marginalia

Minuscule 130 (in the Gregory-Aland numbering), ε 596 (Soden), is a Greek-Latin minuscule manuscript of the New Testament, on paper leaves. Palaeographically it has been assigned to the 15th century. It has some marginalia.

== Description ==
The codex contains the complete text of the four Gospels and consists of 229 paper leaves (size 28.4 cm by 21.1 cm), with one lacuna in John 19:12-21:25. The paper is white, and the ink used is black. The content is arranged in two columns per page, with 26 lines on each page, (size of column 20.6 by 6.5 cm), in black ink. The large initial letters in colour and rubricated.

This particular copy is of noteworthy interest due to its presentation of both Latin and Greek texts in parallel columns. The Greek text is positioned in the right column. The content is divided based on the κεφαλαια (chapters), with chapter numbers provided in the margin and recorded in Latin..

== Text ==
The Greek text of the codex is a representative of the Byzantine text-type. Hermann von Soden classified it to the textual family K^{x}. Aland did not place it to any Category. According to the Claremont Profile Method in Luke 1 and Luke 20 it belongs to the textual family K^{x}. In Luke 10 no profile was made.

In Luke 2:38, in the Latin text, it has the reading "Israel" for "Jerusalem".

== History ==
The scribe was a Latin. The Greek text is often adapted to the Latin one.

The manuscript was examined by Birch about 1782. C. R. Gregory saw it in 1886.

It is currently housed at the Vatican Library (Vat. gr. 359), at Rome.

== See also ==
- List of New Testament minuscules
- Biblical manuscript
- Textual criticism
