= Minuscule 159 =

Greek minuscule manuscript

- New Testament manuscript
- Name: Codex Barberinianus
- Text: Gospels
- Date: 1121?
- Script: Greek
- Now at: Vatican Library
- Size: 26.3 cm by 20.6 cm
- Type: Byzantine text-type
- Category: V
- Note: marginalia

Minuscule 159 (in the Gregory-Aland numbering), ε 113 (Soden), is a Greek minuscule manuscript of the New Testament, on parchment, dated to 1121 (?). It has marginalia.

== Description ==
The codex contains a complete text of the four Gospels on 203 leaves (size 26.3 cm by 20.6 cm). The text is written in two columns per page, in 25 lines per page. The leaves 1-184 are from parchment, the leaves 185-203 are paper. The parchment is dick, ink is brown-black, the large initial letters under lines.

The text is divided according to the κεφαλαια (chapters), whose numbers are given at the margin, and their τιτλοι (titles of chapters) at the top of the pages. There is also a division according to the smaller Ammonian Sections (in Mark 240, the last section in 16:19), with references to the Eusebian Canons (written below Ammonian Section numbers).

It contains also Lectionary markings at the margin (for liturgical use) and subscriptions at the end of each Gospel. The Epistula ad Carpianum, Eusebian tables, table of the κεφαλαια (table of contents) to the Matthew, synaxaria, and Menologion were added in the 16th century.

== Text ==
The Greek text of the codex is a representative of the Byzantine text-type. Hermann von Soden classified it to the textual family K^{x}. Aland placed it in Category V. According to the Claremont Profile Method it belongs to the textual cluster M159.

== History ==
The manuscript was housed at the Barberini Palace, founded by the Cardinal, Francis II.

It was examined and described by Birch (about 1782) and Scholz. C. R. Gregory saw it in 1886.

It is currently housed at the Vatican Library (Barb. gr. 482), at Rome.

== See also ==
- List of New Testament minuscules
- Biblical manuscript
- Textual criticism
