= Minuscule 144 =

Greek minuscule manuscript of the New Testament

- New Testament manuscript
- Text: Gospels †
- Date: 10th-century
- Script: Greek
- Now at: Vatican Library
- Size: 15.5 cm by 12 cm
- Type: Byzantine text-type
- Category: V
- Hand: beautifully written
- Note: full marginalia

Minuscule 144 (in the Gregory-Aland numbering), ε 1001 (Soden), is a Greek minuscule manuscript of the New Testament, on parchment leaves. Palaeographically it has been assigned to the 10th-century. It has full marginalia.

== Description ==
The codex contains the text of the four Gospels on 268 parchment leaves (size 15.5 cm by 12 cm) with some lacunae. The text is written in one column per page, 19-23 lines per page. The initial letters are beautifully written (Gregory). Texts with Matthew 1:1-11:11 (folios 1-35) and John 14:1-21:25 (folios 241-268) were lost. It has some additional matter at the end from Maximus and his Chronology from the 14th-century.

The text is divided according to the κεφαλαια (chapters), whose numbers are given at the margin, with their τιτλοι (titles of chapters) at the top of the pages. There is also a division according to the Ammonian Sections (in Mark 240 sections, the last section in 16:9). It has no a references to the Eusebian Canons (written below Ammonian Section numbers).

It contains the Eusebian Canon tables in uncial letters, and lectionary equipment at the margin (for liturgical use).

== Text ==
The Greek text of the codex is a representative of the Byzantine text-type. Hermann von Soden classified it to the textual family K^{x}. Aland placed it in Category V. According to the Claremont Profile Method it belongs to the textual family K^{x} in Luke 1, Luke 10, and Luke 20.

== History ==
F. H. A. Scrivener dated it to the 11th-century. C. R. Gregory hesitated in that case (10th or 11th-century).

It was examined by Birch (about 1782), Scholz. Gregory saw it in 1886.

It is currently housed at the Vatican Library (Vat. gr. 1254), at Rome.

== See also ==
- List of New Testament minuscules
- Biblical manuscript
- Textual criticism
