= Minuscule 158 =

- New Testament manuscript
- Name: Cod. Pii II
- Text: Gospels
- Date: 11th century
- Script: Greek
- Now at: Vatican Library
- Size: 9 cm by 7.8 cm
- Category: none
- Note: marginalia

Minuscule 158 (in the Gregory-Aland numbering), ε 108 (Soden), is a Greek minuscule manuscript of the New Testament, on parchment. Palaeographically it has been assigned to the 11th century. It has marginalia.

== Description ==
The codex contains the text of the four Gospels on 236 parchment leaves (size 9 cm by 7.8 cm), with one small lacuna. The text is written in one column per page, in 20 lines per page, in very small letters. Size of the text has only 5.8 cm by 4.2 cm. The Gospel of John is ending on 21:11.

The text is divided according to the κεφαλαια (chapters), whose numbers are given at the margin, the τιτλοι (titles) at the top of the pages. There is also another division according to the smaller Ammonian Sections (in Mark 234 – 16:9), with references to the Eusebian Canons (written below Ammonina Section numbers).

It contains the Epistula ad Carpianum, Eusebian Canon tables, tables of the κεφαλαια (tables of contents) before each Gospel, lectionary markings (partial) for liturgical reading, pictures, and readings in the margin made by prima manu.

== Text ==
The Greek text of the codex is a representative of the Byzantine text-type. Hermann von Soden classified it to the textual family K^{x}. Kurt Aland did not place it in any Category. According to the Claremont Profile Method it represents textual family K^{x} in Luke 1 and Luke 10. In Luke 20 it represents family Π^{a}.

It lacks the text of Luke 22:43-44.

It has some readings at the margin.

== History ==
The manuscript was given to the Library by Pope Pius II (1458-1464). It was examined and described by Birch (about 1782), Scholz, Duchesne, and Henry Stevenson. C. R. Gregory saw it in 1886.

It is currently housed at the Vatican Library (Reg. gr. Pii II 55), at Rome.

== See also ==
- List of New Testament minuscules
- Biblical manuscript
- Textual criticism
