= Minuscule 153 =

- New Testament manuscript
- Text: Gospels
- Date: 14th century
- Script: Greek
- Now at: Vatican Library
- Size: 21 cm by 13.5 cm
- Category: none
- Note: marginalia

Minuscule 153 (in the Gregory-Aland numbering), ε 402 (Soden), is a Greek minuscule manuscript of the New Testament, on cotton paper. Palaeographically it has been assigned to the 14th century. Formerly it was dated to 13th century (Scrivener, Gregory).

The manuscript has complex contents and full marginalia.

== Description ==
The codex contains a complete text of the four Gospels on 268 cotton paper leaves (size 21 cm by 13.5 cm). The text is written in one column per page, in 22-25 lines per page (size of text 14.6 by 8.9 cm). The text is written in brown ink, the capital letters in red. The colour of paper is brown.

The text is divided according to the κεφαλαια (chapters), whose numbers are given at the margin, and their τιτλοι (titles of chapters) at the top of the pages. There is also another division according to the smaller Ammonian Sections (in Mark 241 - last numbered section in 16:20), but without references to the Eusebian Canons.

It contains prolegomena, tables of the κεφαλαια (tables of contents) before each Gospel, lectionary markings at the margin (for liturgical use), the beginning of church lessons is marked (incipits), Synaxarion, Menologion, large subscriptions at the end of each Gospel, with numbers of στιχοι.

== Text ==
The Greek text of the codex is representative of the Byzantine text-type, but Aland did not place it in any Category. According to the Claremont Profile Method it belongs to the textual family Family K^{x} in Luke 1, Luke 10, and Luke 20.

== History ==
It is dated by the INTF to the 14th century.

The manuscript was examined by Birch (about 1782) and Scholz. (major part of it) C. R. Gregory saw the manuscript in 1886.

It is currently housed at the Vatican Library (Pal. gr. 229), at Rome.

== See also ==
- List of New Testament minuscules
- Biblical manuscript
- Textual criticism
