= Minuscule 150 =

- New Testament manuscript
- Name: Pal.-Vaticanus 189
- Text: Gospels
- Date: 11th century
- Script: Greek
- Now at: Vatican Library
- Size: 11.6 cm by 8.7 cm
- Type: Byzantine text-type
- Category: V
- Note: marginalia

Minuscule 150 is a Greek minuscule manuscript of the New Testament Gospels, written on parchment. It is designated by the siglum 150 in the Gregory-Aland numbering of New Testament manuscripts, and ε 107 in the von Soden numbering of New Testament manuscripts. Using the study of comparative writing styles (palaeography), it has been assigned to the 11th century. The manuscript has complex contents, with full marginal notes.

== Description ==
The manuscript is a codex (precursor to the modern book format), containing the complete text of the four Gospels written on 331 parchment leaves (sized 11.6 cm by 8.7 cm). The text is written in one column per page, with 23 lines per page. The capital letters are written in gold ink. The text is divided according to the Ammonian Sections, whose numbers are given in the margin, with references to the Eusebian Canons which are written below the Ammonian Section numbers (both early divisions of the Gospels into sections).

It contains the Eusebian Canon tables, Prolegomena, the tables of contents (known as κεφαλαια kephalaia) before each Gospel, lectionary markings in the margin (for liturgical use), incipits, the synaxaria and Menologion, subscriptions at the end of each Gospel with the numbers of lines (known as στιχοι / stichoi), and pictures, with a picture of the baptism of Jesus in the Gospel of Mark.

== Text ==
The Greek text of the codex is considered to be a representative of the Byzantine text-type. Textual critic Hermann von Soden classified it to the textual family K^{x}. Biblical scholar Kurt Aland placed it in Category V of his New Testament manuscript classification system. Category V manuscripts are described as "manuscripts with a purely or predominantly Byzantine text."

According to the Claremont Profile Method (a specific analysis of textual data), it belongs to the textual family Family K^{x} in Luke 1 and Luke 10. In Luke 20 it has a mixed Byzantine text related to family Π200.

== History ==
The earliest history of the manuscript is unknown. The manuscript was examined and described by biblical scholar Andreas Birch in about 1782, and by textual critic Johann M. A. Scholz. Biblical scholar Caspar René Gregory saw it in 1886.

Birch dated the manuscript to the 12th century. It is currently dated by the INTF to the 12th century. It is currently housed at the Vatican Library (shelf number Pal. gr. 189), in Rome.

== See also ==
- List of New Testament minuscules
- Biblical manuscript
- Textual criticism
