= Minuscule 133 =

- New Testament manuscript
- Text: New Testament (except Rev.)
- Date: 11th century
- Script: Greek
- Now at: Vatican Library
- Size: 20.1 cm by 16.3 cm
- Type: Byzantine text-type
- Category: V
- Note: marginalia

Minuscule 133 (in the Gregory-Aland numbering), δ150 (Soden), is a Greek minuscule manuscript of the New Testament, on parchment leaves. Palaeographically it has been assigned to the 11th century. It has marginalia.

== Description ==
The codex contains the text of the New Testament except the Book of Revelation, on 232 parchment leaves (size 20.1 cm by 16.3 cm). The text is written in one column per page, 29 lines per page (size of the text 15 by 10.3 cm), in black ink.

The text is divided according to the κεφαλαια (chapters), whose numbers are given at the margin, and their τιτλοι (titles of chapters) at the top of the pages. The text of the Gospels is also divided according to the smaller Ammonian Sections (in Mark 233, last numbered section in 16:8). It has no references to the Eusebian Canons.

It contains prolegomena of Cosmas, tables of the κεφαλαια (tables of contents) before each book, lectionary markings at the margin (for liturgical use), subscriptions at the end of each sacred book, synaxaria, Menologion, pictures, and Euthalian prologues.

The order of books: Gospels, Acts, Catholic epistles, and Pauline epistles.

== Text ==
The Greek text of the codex is a representative of the Byzantine text-type. Hermann von Soden classified it to the textual family K^{x}. Aland placed it in Category V.

According to the Claremont Profile Method it belongs to the textual group Π473.

== History ==
The manuscript was examined by Birch about 1782. C. R. Gregory saw it in 1886.

It is currently housed at the Vatican Library (Vat. gr. 363), at Rome.

== See also ==
- List of New Testament minuscules
- Biblical manuscript
- Textual criticism
