= Minuscule 184 =

- New Testament manuscript
- Text: Gospels
- Date: 13th century
- Script: Greek
- Now at: Laurentian Library
- Size: 22.8 cm by 14.2 cm
- Category: none
- Note: marginalia

Minuscule 184 (in the Gregory-Aland numbering), ε 312 (Soden), is a Greek minuscule manuscript of the New Testament, on parchment. Palaeographically it has been assigned to the 13th century. It has marginalia.

== Description ==
The codex contains a complete text of the four Gospels on 72 parchment leaves (size 22.8 cm by 14.2 cm). The text is written in two columns per page, in 24 lines per page (size of column 19.1 by 5 cm), in black ink, the initial letters in red.

The text is divided according to the small Ammonian Sections (in Mark 236 sections), with references to the Eusebian Canons (written below Ammonian Section numbers).

It contains the Epistula ad Carpianum, prolegomena, the tables of the κεφαλαια (tables of contents) are placed before each Gospel. It contains a lectionary markings at the margin for liturgical reading.

== Text ==
The Greek text of the codex is a representative of the Byzantine text-type. Aland did not place it in any Category.

According to the Claremont Profile Method it belongs to the textual group 1216, as a core member.

Textually it has some relationship to the group 16.

== History ==
The manuscript is dated by the INTF to the 13th century.

The manuscript was examined by Birch, Scholz, and Burgon. C. R. Gregory saw it in 1886.

It is currently housed at the Laurentian Library (Plutei. VI. 15), at Florence.

== See also ==
- List of New Testament minuscules
- Biblical manuscript
- Textual criticism
