= Minuscule 415 =

- New Testament manuscript
- Text: Gospels
- Date: 1356
- Script: Greek
- Now at: Biblioteca Marciana
- Size: 18.3 cm by 13.2 cm
- Type: Byzantine text-type
- Category: V
- Note: unusual ending of the Lord's Prayer

Minuscule 415 (in the Gregory-Aland numbering), ε 421 (in the Soden numbering), is a Greek minuscule manuscript of the New Testament, on parchment. It is dated by a colophon to the year 1356. It has marginalia.

== Description ==
The codex contains a complete text of the four Gospels on 226 parchment leaves (18.3 cm by 13.2 cm). The text is written in one column per page, in 27 lines per page.

The text is divided according to the κεφαλαια (chapters), whose numbers are given at the margin, the τιτλοι (titles) at the top of the pages.

It contains tables of the κεφαλαια (tables of contents) before each Gospel, Argumentum, lectionary markings at the margin at the margin, αναγνωσεις (lessons), subscriptions at the end of each Gospel, Synaxarion, Menologion, and pictures.

== Text ==
The Greek text of the codex is a representative of the Byzantine text-type. Hermann von Soden classified it to the textual family K^{r}. Aland placed it in Category V.

According to the Claremont Profile Method it represents textual family Π^{b} in Luke 1 (weak member) and family Π^{a} in Luke 20 (weak member). In Luke 10 no profile was made.

== History ==
According to the colophon the manuscript was written in January, 1356. Wiedmann and J. G. J. Braun collated some portions of the manuscript for Scholz (1794-1852). The manuscript was added to the list of New Testament manuscripts by Scholz. C. R. Gregory saw it in 1886.

The manuscript is currently housed at the Biblioteca Marciana (Gr. I. 22) in Venice.

== See also ==
- List of New Testament minuscules
- Biblical manuscript
- Textual criticism
