= Minuscule 107 =

- New Testament manuscript
- Name: Codex Ravianus
- Text: Gospels
- Date: 13th century
- Script: Greek
- Now at: Bodleian Library
- Size: 21.7 cm by 16.7 cm
- Type: Byzantine text-type
- Category: V
- Note: marginalia

Minuscule 107 (in the Gregory-Aland numbering), ε 344 (Soden), is a Greek minuscule manuscript of the New Testament, on parchment leaves. Palaeographically it has been assigned to the 13th century.

== Description ==
The codex contains a complete text of the four Gospels on 351 parchment leaves (21.7 cm by 16.7 cm). The text is written in one column per page, 18-22 lines per page. The initial letters in gold.

The text is divided according to the κεφαλαια (chapters), whose numbers are given at the margin, the τιτλοι (titles of chapters) at the top of the pages.

It contains tables of the κεφαλαια (tables of contents) before each Gospel, and pictures.

It was written by more than one scribe. The first page of Matthew is written in gold.

The Greek text of the codex is a representative of the Byzantine text-type. Hermann von Soden classified it to the textual family K^{x}. Aland placed it in Category V. According to the Claremont Profile Method it represents mixed Byzantine text in Luke 1, textual family K^{x} in Luke 20, in Luke 10 no profile was made.

== History ==
It was examined by Wettstein, Griesbach, and Scholz. Wettsteins's and Griesbach's 107 is Gregory's minuscule 201. Scholz dated the manuscript to the 14th century.

C. R. Gregory saw it in 1883.

It is housed at the Bodleian Library (E. D. Clarke 6) at Oxford.

== See also ==
- List of New Testament minuscules
- Biblical manuscript
- Textual criticism
