= Minuscule 188 =

- New Testament manuscript
- Text: Gospels
- Date: 12th century
- Script: Greek
- Now at: Laurentian Library
- Size: 15.2 cm by 11.6 cm
- Type: Byzantine text-type
- Category: none
- Note: K^{x} marginalia

Minuscule 188 (in the Gregory-Aland numbering), ε 223 (Soden), is a Greek minuscule manuscript of the New Testament, on parchment. Palaeographically it has been assigned to the 12th century. It has marginalia.

== Description ==
The codex contains a complete text of the four Gospels on 228 thick parchment leaves (size 15.2 cm by 11.6 cm). The text is written in one column per page, in 25 lines per page (10 by 7 cm), in black and brown ink, the capital letters in red. It is a beautiful manuscript.

The text is divided according to the κεφαλαια (chapters), whose numbers are given at the margin, and their τιτλοι (titles of chapters) at the top of the pages. There is also a division according to the Ammonian Sections (in Mark 233 Sections; 16:8), with references to the Eusebian Canons (written below Ammonian Section numbers).

It contains prolegomena, tables of the κεφαλαια (tables of contents) before each Gospel, lectionary markings at the margin for liturgical reading, synaxaria, Menologion, and subscriptions at the end of each Gospel, with numbers of στιχοι.

== Text ==
The Greek text of the codex is a representative of the Byzantine text-type. Hermann von Soden included it to the textual family K^{x}. Aland did not place it in any Category. According to the Claremont Profile Method it belongs to the textual group M106 in Luke 1, Luke 10, and Luke 20.

== History ==
The manuscript was examined by Birch, Scholz, and Burgon. C. R. Gregory saw it in 1886.

It is currently housed at the Laurentian Library (Plutei. VI. 25), at Florence.

== See also ==
- List of New Testament minuscules
- Biblical manuscript
- Textual criticism
