= Minuscule 1281 =

- New Testament manuscript
- Text: Gospels †
- Date: 10th century
- Script: Greek
- Now at: Fitzwilliam Museum
- Size: 26.3 cm by 19 cm
- Type: Byzantine text-type
- Category: none
- Note: —

Minuscule 1281 (in the Gregory-Aland numbering), ε1019 (von Soden), is a Greek minuscule manuscript of the New Testament written on parchment. Palaeographically it has been assigned to the 10th century. The manuscript has no complex contents. Scrivener labelled it as 469^{e}.

== Description ==
The codex contains the text of the four Gospels, on 259 parchment leaves (size 26.3 cm by 19 cm), with some lacunae. It lacks the beginning of Matthew, Mark, Luke, Luke 2:9-22; John 10:125-12:26; 13:4-21:25. The text is written in one column per page, 19 lines per page. It has decorated headpieces.

The text is divided according to the κεφαλαια (chapters), whose numbers are given at the margin, with their τιτλοι (titles of chapters) at the top of the pages. There is also another division according to the smaller Ammonian Sections, with references to the Eusebian Canons.

It contains the Epistula ad Carpianum, Eusebian Canon tables, tables of the κεφαλαια (tables of contents) before each Gospel, and Prolegomena.

== Text ==
The Greek text of the codex is a representative of the Byzantine text-type with some pre-Byzantine readings. Hermann von Soden classified it to the textual family I^{κ}, which text was established by Pamphilius in Caesarea. Aland did not place it in any Category.

According to the Claremont Profile Method it represents textual family K^{x} in Luke 1 and Luke 20. In Luke 10 no profile was made. It belongs to the textual cluster Ω.

== History ==
Scrivener dated the manuscript to the 11th or 12th century; Gregory dated the manuscript to the 10th century. The manuscript is currently dated by the INTF to the 10th century.

It was added to the list of the New Testament manuscripts by F. H. A. Scrivener (469) and C. R. Gregory (1281). Gregory saw the manuscript in 1886.

It was brought by Alexander Cesnola from Cyprus. It was catalogued in Bernard Quaritch's Catalogue (March 1893).

The manuscript is now housed at the Fitzwilliam Museum (Mc-Clean Collection?) in Cambridge.

== See also ==
- List of New Testament minuscules
- List of New Testament minuscules (1001–2000)
- Biblical manuscript
- Textual criticism
