= Minuscule 172 =

- New Testament manuscript
- Text: Acts, Paul, Rev.
- Date: 13th/14th century
- Script: Greek
- Found: 1824
- Now at: Berlin State Library
- Size: 24 cm by 16 cm
- Category: none
- Note: marginalia

Minuscule 172 (in the Gregory-Aland numbering), α 404 (Soden), is a Greek minuscule manuscript of the New Testament, on parchment. Palaeographically it has been assigned to the 13th or the 14th century. Formerly it was labelled by 178^{a}, 242^{p}, and 87^{r}. It has marginalia.

== Description ==
The codex contains the text of the Acts of the Apostles, Pauline epistles, and Book of Revelation on 234 parchment leaves (size 24 cm by 16 cm) with numerous lacunae. The text is written in one column per page, in 24-30 lines per page. The leaves are arranged in quarto.

The Pauline epistles are written in smaller letters than the rest.

The text is divided according to the κεφαλαια (chapters), whose numbers are given at the margin.

It contains prolegomena, tables of the κεφαλαια (tables of contents) to Pauline epistles, lectionary markings in the margin (for liturgical use), incipits, αναγνωσεις (lessons), subscriptions at the end of each book, and numbers of στιχοι.

Lacunae

Acts 1:1-4:24; 5:2-16; 6:2-7:2; 7:16-8:10; 8:38-9:13; 9:26-39; 10:9-22; 10:43-13:1; 23:32-24:24; 28:23-James 1:5; 3:6-4:16; 2 Peter 3:10-1 John 1:1; 3:13-4:2; Jude 16-25; Romans 14:23 - 15:1.4; 1 Corinthians 3:15-15:23; 2 Corinthians 10: 14-11:19; 13:5-13; Ephesians 1:1-2:14; 5:29-6:24 Colossians 1:24-26; 2:4-7; 2 Thessalonians 1:1-3:5; Hebrews 9:3-10:29 Rev 14:4-14; 21: 12-22:21.

== Text ==
Kurt Aland did not place the Greek text of the codex in any category.

== History ==
It was examined by Birch (about 1782), Scholz, and Scrivener. Scrivener in 1856 fully collated Apocalypse. C. R. Gregory saw it in 1883. Formerly it was labelled by 178^{a}, 242^{p}, and 87^{r}. In 1908 Gregory gave for it number 172.

It is currently housed at the Berlin State Library (Phill. 1461), at Berlin.

== See also ==
- List of New Testament minuscules
- Biblical manuscript
- Textual criticism
