= Minuscule 109 =

- New Testament manuscript
- Name: Codex Neapolitanus
- Text: Gospels
- Date: 1326
- Script: Greek
- Now at: British Library
- Size: 19.2 cm by 14.6 cm
- Type: Byzantine text-type
- Category: V
- Note: marginalia

Minuscule 109 (in the Gregory-Aland numbering), ε 431 (Soden), is a Greek minuscule manuscript of the New Testament, on parchment leaves. It is dated by a colophon to the year 1326. The manuscript has complex contents.

== Description ==
The codex contains a complete text of the four Gospels with a commentary on 225 parchment leaves (19.2 cm by 14.6 cm). The text is written in one column per page, 24-31 lines per page. The initial letters in red.

The text is divided according to κεφαλαια (chapters), whose numbers are given at the margin, the τιτλοι (titles) at the top of the pages. There is also a division according to the Ammonian Sections. I has no references to the Eusebian Canons.

It contains the Epistula ad Carpianum, prolegomena, lists of the κεφαλαια (lists of contents) before each Gospel, Eusebian Tables, synaxaria, Menologion, lectionary markings at the margin, subscriptions at the end of each Gospel, and numbers of στιχοι.

Text of Luke 3:23-38 (Genealogy of Jesus) was rewritten from a two-column text. In the process of copying, the columns were confused, and instead of copying them vertically in proper succession, the scribe copied the genealogy as though the two columns were one, following the lines across both columns. As a result, almost everyone is made the son of the wrong father. (For instance, God is made the son of Aram and Phares is made creator of the world. See also Minuscule 80.)

== Text ==
The Greek text of the codex is a representative of the Byzantine text-type. Aland placed it in Category V. It belongs to the textual family Family K^{x}. It is close to Minuscule 54.

According to the Claremont Profile Method it represents K^{x} in Luke 1. In Luke 10 and Luke 20 it has mixture of the Byzantine families.

It does not contain the Pericope Adulterae (John 7:53-8:11), but it was added by a later hand.

== History ==
It once belonged to Richard Mead, then to Askew. Richard Mead showed it for Wettstein in 1746. C. R. Gregory saw it in 1883.

It is housed at the British Library (Add MS 5117) in London.

== See also ==
- List of New Testament minuscules
- Biblical manuscript
- Textual criticism
