= Minuscule 148 =

- New Testament manuscript
- Text: Gospels
- Date: 11th century
- Script: Greek
- Now at: Vatican Library
- Size: 19 cm by 15.9 cm
- Type: Byzantine text-type
- Category: V
- Note: unusual readings marginalia

Minuscule 148 (in the Gregory-Aland numbering), ε 132 (Soden), is a Greek minuscule manuscript of the New Testament, on parchment leaves. Palaeographically it has been assigned to the 11th century. It has marginalia.

== Description ==
The codex contains a complete text of the four Gospels on 153 parchment leaves (size 19 cm by 15.9 cm). The text is written in one column per page, in 21 lines per page.

The text is divided according to the κεφαλαια (chapters), whose numbers are given at the margin, and their τιτλοι (titles of chapters) at the top of the pages. There is also another division according to the smaller Ammonian Sections (in Mark 234, last numbered section in 16:9), with references to the Eusebian Canons (written below Ammonian Section numbers).

It contains tables of the κεφαλαια (tables of contents) before each Gospel, synaxaria, and some scholia on the margin.

== Text ==
The Greek text of the codex is a representative of the Byzantine text-type. Hermann von Soden classified it to the textual family K^{x}. Aland placed it in Category V.

According to the Claremont Profile Method it belongs to the textual family K^{x} in Luke 1, Luke 10, and Luke 20.

The text of the Gospels has some unusual readings.

== History ==
Birch and Scrivener dated it to the 13th century. Gregory dated it to the 11th century. Currently it is dated by the INTF to the 11th century.

The manuscript was examined by Birch (about 1782) and Scholz. C. R. Gregory saw the manuscript in 1886.

It is currently housed at the Vatican Library (Pal. gr. 136), at Rome.

== See also ==
- List of New Testament minuscules
- Biblical manuscript
- Textual criticism
