= Minuscule 794 =

- New Testament manuscript
- Text: Gospels, Acts, Epistles
- Date: 14th century
- Script: Greek
- Now at: National Library of Greece
- Size: 21 cm by 15 cm
- Type: Byzantine text-type
- Category: V
- Note: –

Minuscule 794 (in the Gregory-Aland numbering), δ454 (von Soden), is a Greek minuscule manuscript of the New Testament written on paper. Palaeographically it has been assigned to the 14th century. The manuscript has no complex contents.

== Description ==
The codex contains the text of the four Gospels, Book of Acts, Catholic epistles, and Pauline epistles on 269 paper leaves (size 21 cm by 15 cm), with some lacunae. The later hand supplied texts of Matthew 1:1-9:19; 1 Timothy 5:4-Philemon. It lacks Romans 1:1-7.17-23.

The text is written in one column per page, 32 lines per page.

The text is divided according to the κεφαλαια (chapters), whose numbers are given at the margin, with their τιτλοι (titles) at the top of the pages. There is also another division according to the smaller Ammonian Sections (ends on 67 in Mark). There is no references to the Eusebian Canons.

It contains tables of the κεφαλαια (tables of contents), lectionary markings at the margin, and pictures (later hand).

== Text ==
The Greek text of the codex is a representative of the Byzantine text-type. Hermann von Soden classified it to the textual family K^{x}. Aland placed it in Category V.

According to the Claremont Profile Method it represents mixed Byzantine text in Luke 1 and Luke 20. In Luke 10 no profile was made. It belongs to the textual cluster 183.

The text of Matthew 16:2b-3 was added by the first hand on the margin. The text of the Pericope Adulterae (John 7:53-8:11) was added by a later hand.

The text of Hebrews was copied twice, once by the original hand, and a second time by the later scribe who had taken over the copying at 2 Timothy. Not realizing the first scribe had already copied Hebrews, the second scribe copied it again.

== History ==
According to Gregory the manuscript was written in the 14th century. The manuscript is currently dated by the INTF to the 14th century. The name of scribe was Paul.

The manuscript was noticed in catalogue from 1876.

It was added to the list of New Testament manuscripts by Gregory (794). Gregory saw the manuscript in 1886.

The manuscript is now housed at the National Library of Greece (122) in Athens.

== See also ==
- List of New Testament minuscules
- Biblical manuscript
- Textual criticism
- Minuscule 793
