= Minuscule 343 =

- New Testament manuscript
- Name: Mediolani Ambrosianus H
- Text: Gospels
- Date: 11th century
- Script: Greek
- Now at: Biblioteca Ambrosiana
- Cite: Scholz, Biblisch-kritische Reise (1823)
- Size: 17.3 cm × 12.1 cm (6.8 in × 4.8 in)
- Type: Byzantine text-type
- Category: V
- Note: full marginalia

Minuscule 343 (in the Gregory-Aland numbering), ε 120 (Soden), is a Greek minuscule manuscript of the New Testament, on parchment. Palaeographically it has been assigned to the 11th century. It has full marginalia.

== Description ==
The codex contains a complete text of the four Gospels on 283 parchment leaves (17.3 cm by 12.1 cm). The text is written in one column per page, in 21 lines per page.

The text is divided according to the κεφαλαια ('chapters'), whose numbers are given at the margin, and their τιτλοι ('titles of chapters') at the top of the pages. There is also a division according to the Ammonian Sections (in Mark 242 Sections, the last in 16:20), whose numbers are given at the margin, with references to the Eusebian Canons (written below Ammonian Section numbers).

It contains the Epistula ad Carpianum (added by a later hand), the Eusebian Canon tables, table of the κεφαλαια ('tables of contents') before each Gospel, and pictures. Lectionary markings at the margin (for liturgical reading) were added by later hand.

== Text ==
The Greek text of the codex is a representative of the Byzantine text-type. Hermann von Soden classified it to the textual family K^{x}. Aland placed it in Category V. According to the Claremont Profile Method it creates the textual cluster 343 in Luke 1 and Luke 10. In Luke 20 it has a mixture of the Byzantine text-families.

== History ==
The manuscript was written by Presbyter Antony, a monk, on September 1. According to the colophon: η των αγατων πραγματων αγγελια ειληφε τελος μηνι σεπτεμβριω πρωτω ημερα μεν ην πρωτη της εβδομαδος ινδικτ. δε ανουσα η τριτη χειρι γραφεισα ευτελους πρεσβυτερος Αντωνιω τουνομα και μοναχος παντων εσχατος. οσοι δε χριστου υποκυπτοντες νομω και εν η εκ πεθου σπυδεως μελετωντες. ευχεσθε αυτω τω ταλαν πρεσβυτη οπως δια των υμων ευχων παρασχει χριστος αυτ αφεσιν, πολλων οφειληματων ινα και υμεις μιστον λημψησυη παντες παρ' αυτου του αιροντος τας αμαρτιας.

It was partly examined by Scholz (Matthew and John). Burgon saw this manuscript. It was added to the list of New Testament manuscripts by Scholz (1794-1852). C. R. Gregory saw it in 1886.

The manuscript is currently housed at the Biblioteca Ambrosiana (H. 13 sup.) in Milan.

== See also ==
- List of New Testament minuscules
- Biblical manuscript
- Textual criticism
