= Minuscule 765 =

- New Testament manuscript
- Text: Gospels
- Date: 12th century
- Script: Greek
- Now at: National Library of Greece
- Size: 18 cm by 12.5 cm
- Type: Byzantine text-type
- Category: V
- Note: —

Minuscule 765 (in the Gregory-Aland numbering), ε478 (von Soden), is a Greek minuscule manuscript of the New Testament written on parchment. Palaeographically it has been assigned to the 12th century. The manuscript has complex contents. Scrivener labelled it as 856^{e}.

== Description ==
The codex contains the text of the four Gospels, on 229 parchment leaves (size 18 cm by 12.5 cm), with one lacuna. The text is written in one column per page, 29–31 lines per page. Its lacking texts of John 19:5 – 21:25 were supplied by a later hand on paper.

The text is divided according to the κεφαλαια (chapters), whose numbers are given at the margin, with their τιτλοι (titles) at the top of the pages. There is also another division according to the smaller Ammonian Sections (in Mark 240 sections, the last in 16:19), but without a references to the Eusebian Canons.

It contains tables of the κεφαλαια before each Gospel (tables of contents), lectionary markings at the margin, incipits, liturgical books with hagiographies (Synaxarion and Menologion), subscriptions at the end of each Gospel, and numbers of στιχοι.

== Text ==
The Greek text of the codex is a representative of the Byzantine text-type. Hermann von Soden classified it to the textual family K^{x}. Aland placed it in Category V.

According to the Claremont Profile Method it represents textual family K^{x} in Luke 1 and Luke 20. In Luke 10 no profile was made. It belongs to the textual cluster 550.

== History ==
Scrivener dated the manuscript to the 14th century; Gregory dated it to the 12th century. Currently the manuscript is dated by the INTF to the 12th century.

The manuscript belonged to the monastery του Δεοντιου, and it was presented to the Museum in Aegina.

It was added to the list of New Testament manuscripts by Scrivener (856) and Gregory (765). Gregory saw the manuscript in 1886.

The manuscript is now housed at the National Library of Greece (158) in Athens.

== See also ==
- List of New Testament minuscules
- Biblical manuscript
- Textual criticism
- Minuscule 763
