= Minuscule 193 =

- New Testament manuscript
- Text: Gospels
- Date: 12th/13th century
- Script: Greek
- Now at: Laurentian Library
- Size: 15.8 cm by 12.8 cm
- Type: Byzantine text-type
- Category: V
- Note: marginalia

Minuscule 193 (in the Gregory-Aland numbering), ε 225 (Soden), is a Greek minuscule manuscript of the New Testament, on parchment. Palaeographically it has been assigned to the 12th or 13th century. It has complex contents and full marginalia.

== Description ==
The codex contains a complete text of the four Gospels, written on parchment leaves (size 15.8 cm by 12.8 cm), in one column per page, in 27 lines per page, in black or dark-brown ink, the capital letters in gold.

The text is divided according to the κεφαλαια (chapters), whose numbers are given at the margin, and the τιτλοι (titles of chapters) at the top of the pages. There is also a division according to the smaller Ammonian Sections (in Mark 240 Sections – the last numbered section in 16:20), (no references to the Eusebian Canons).

It contains the Epistula ad Carpianum, Eusebian Canon tables at the beginning, and pictures (before Gospel of John, portrait of John the Evangelist with Prochorus). Lectionary markings at the margin and αναγνωσεις (lessons) were added by a later hand.

== Text ==
The Greek text of the codex is a representative of the Byzantine text-type. Hermann von Soden classified it to the textual family K^{x}. Aland placed it in Category V.

According to the Claremont Profile Method it represents textual family K^{x} in Luke 1 and Luke 20. In Luke 10 no profile was made.

== History ==
The manuscript was examined by Birch, Scholz, and Burgon. C. R. Gregory saw it in 1886.

It is currently housed at the Laurentian Library (Plutei. VI. 32), at Florence.

== See also ==
- List of New Testament minuscules
- Biblical manuscript
- Textual criticism
