= Family Kx =

Large group of the New Testament manuscripts

Family K^{x} is a large group of the New Testament manuscripts. It belongs to the Byzantine text-type as one of the textual families of this group. It includes uncials, and although hundreds of minuscules, no early ones.

== Description ==
The group was discovered by Hermann von Soden and designated by him with symbol K^{x}. The only distinction von Soden made among K^{x} members was according to the presence and type of the Pericope adulterae. Due to the massive influence of the group on other groups and its lack of control, the boundaries of group remain blurred. The most problematic is the question, how many K^{x} readings can be missing and how many surplus readings can be added before a manuscript no longer deserves to be classified as K^{x}?

According to the Claremont Profile Method K^{x} has following profile in Luke 1, 10, and 20 are: (Note: The word before the bracket is the reading of the UBS edition; the readings which are not bold are those of the TR. See F. Wisse, The Profile Method for the Classification and Evaluation of Manuscript Evidence, p. 95,)

- Luke 1:10 — ην του λαου] του λαου ην
- Luke 1:44 — εν αγαλλιασει το βρεφος ] το βρεφος εν αγαλλιασει
- (Luke 10:1) — ημελλεν ] εμελλεν
- Luke 10:6 — εαν ] μεν
- Luke 10:8 — ην ] δ'
- Luke 10:12 — λεγω ] + δε
- (Luke 10:30) — εκδυσαντες ] εξεδυσαν
- Luke 10:36 — πλησιον δοκει σοι ] δοκει σοι πλησιον
- (Luke 10:39) — τον λογον ] των λογων
- Luke 20:1 — αρχιερεις ] ιερεις
- Luke 20:5 — δια τι ] + ουν
- Luke 20:9 — τις ] omit
- Luke 20:19 — τον λαον ] omit
- Luke 20:28 — Μωυσης ] Μωσης
- Luke 20:31 — ωσαυτως ] + ως αυτως
- Luke 20:31 — επτα ] + και
- Luke 20:32 — υστερον ] + παντων
- Luke 20:35 — γαμιζονται ] εκγαμιζονται (TR reads: εκγαμισκονται)
- (Luke 20:37) — Μωυσης ] Μωσης.

According to von Soden the group K^{x} emerged in the 10th century. The group probably evolved from Family E, which is not as easy to distinguish as groups K^{r} and K^{1}. Von Soden included these Kappa manuscripts in this family, which are not classified as K^{r} or K^{i}.

The Textus Receptus was created on the basis of the manuscripts of this group.

== Members of the family ==
Codex Seidelianus II (H/013), 2, 3, 8, 14, 45, 47, 49, 51, 54, 56, 58, 59, 60, 61, 73, 75, 76, 78, 84, 89, 96, 99, 105, 107, 109, 121, 123, 126, 130, 132, 133, 134, 135, 140, 142, 144, 145, 148, 149, 150, 153, 156, 158, 159, 165, 173, 175, 176, 179, 180, 182, 183, 185, 187, 188, 190, 191, 192, 193, 198, 200, 202, 204, 207, 208, 212, 218, 226, 227, 228, 231, 234, 247, 260, 267, 274, 275, 276, 282, 283, 284, 293, 294, 298, 301, 324, 330, 331, 343, 347, 351, 352, 358, 359, 360, 364, 367, 371, 373, 375, 376, 380, 388, 390, 396, 401, 402, 403, 405, 407, 409, 410, 411, 412, 413, 414, 415, 416, 431, 439, 447, 448, 470, 471, 475, 478, 483, 484, 490, 492, 493, 494, 501, 504, 505, 506, 507, 529, 530, 568, 585, 663, 669, 672, 710, 714, 725, 778, 808, 839, 844, 864, 875, 877, 939, 971, 1069, 1076, 1417, 1452, 1474, 1569, 1671, 1693, 2112, 2217, 2455, 2649.

There are some manuscripts very close textually to group K^{x}, but they differ in some details. To this group belong the codices: 024, 026, 027, 036, 047, 0130, 4, 251, 273, 440, 472, 485, 495, 660, 716, 871, 1047, 1093, 1170, 1229, 1242, 1295, 1355, 1365, 1396, 1515, 1604. They are designated by I' and do not form a textual family.

There are group A^{k} related to the Byzantine commentated text: 15, 53, 902, 1163, 1167.

Some manuscripts in some parts represent family K^{x}: 446, 508, 715, 762, 764, 765, 766, 768, 775, 777, 779, 783, 784, 785, 790, 793, 794, 795, 796, 797, 799, 801, 811, 831, 860, 872, 895, 929, 933, 934, 935, 937, 941, 942, 943, 1281.

== See also ==
- Family E
- Family Π
- Family K^{1}
- Family K^{r}
- Family 1424
