= Minuscule 895 =

- New Testament manuscript
- Text: Gospels
- Date: 13th century
- Script: Greek
- Now at: Princeton University Library
- Size: 19 cm by 15.4 cm
- Type: Byzantine
- Category: none
- Note: marginalia

Minuscule 895 (in the Gregory-Aland numbering), ε3062 (von Soden), is a 13th-century Greek minuscule manuscript of the New Testament on parchment. It has marginalia. The manuscript has survived in complete condition.

== Description ==
The codex contains the text of the four Gospels, with a commentary, on 239 parchment leaves (size 19 cm by 15.4 cm). The text is written in one column per page, 22 lines per page.

The text of the Gospels is divided according to the κεφαλαια (chapters), whose numbers are given at the margin, and their τιτλοι (titles of chapters) at the top of the pages. There is also a division according to the smaller Ammonian Sections (in Mark 237 sections, the last section in 16:5), whose numbers are given at the margin, with references to the Eusebian Canons (written below Ammonian Section numbers).

It contains the Epistula ad Carpianum, Eusebian Canon tables, Prolegomena, tables of the κεφαλαια (tables of contents), lectionary markings at the margin (for liturgical use), subscriptions at the end each of the Gospels, and pictures.

== Text ==
The Greek text of the codex is a representative of the Byzantine. Hermann von Soden classified it to the textual family K^{x}. Kurt Aland did not place it in any Category.

According to the Claremont Profile Method it represents the textual family M10 in Luke 1 and Luke 20. In Luke 10 no profile was made.

== History ==
According to C. R. Gregory it was written in the 11th or 12th century. Currently the manuscript is dated by the INTF to the 13th century.

The manuscript was added to the list of New Testament manuscripts by Gregory (895^{e}). Formerly it was also classified as minuscule 2366 on the list of the New Testament manuscripts.

It is not cited in critical editions of the Greek New Testament (UBS4, NA28).

The manuscript is housed at the Princeton University Library (Garrett 7), in Princeton.

== See also ==
- List of New Testament minuscules (1–1000)
- Biblical manuscript
- Textual criticism
- Minuscule 894
