= Minuscule 380 =

- New Testament manuscript
- Text: Gospels
- Date: 1499
- Script: Greek
- Now at: Vatican Library
- Size: 23.2 cm by 15.3 cm
- Type: Byzantine text-type
- Category: V
- Note: marginalia

Minuscule 380 is a Greek minuscule manuscript of the New Testament, made of parchment. It is designated by the siglum 380 in the Gregory-Aland numbering of New Testament manuscripts, and ε 547 in the von Soden numbering of New Testament manuscripts. It is dated by a colophon to the year 1499. It has marginal notes.

== Description ==
The manuscript is a codex (precursor to the modern book format), containing the text of the four Gospels on 202 parchment leaves (sized 23.2 cm by 15.3 cm). The text is written in one column per page, in 23 lines per page.

The text is divided according to the chapters (known as κεφαλαια / kephalaia), whose numbers are given in the margin in both Greek and Latin numerals. There is also a division according to the Ammonian Sections, with references to the Eusebian Canons written below the Ammonian Section numbers. It contains the Epistle to Carpian, Eusebian Canon tables, prolegomena, tables of contents (also known as κεφαλαια) before each Gospel, and subscriptions at the end of each Gospel.

== Text ==
The Greek text of the codex is considered to be a representative of the Byzantine text-type. Textual critic Hermann von Soden classified it to the textual family K^{x}. Biblical scholar Kurt Aland placed it in Category V of his New Testament manuscript classification system. Category V manuscripts are described as "manuscripts with a purely or predominantly Byzantine text."

The Claremont Profile Method (a specific analysis of textual data) confirmed its K^{x} membership in Luke 1, Luke 10, and Luke 20. The text was corrected toward Π groups.

== History ==
The manuscript was written by Demetrius Moschus Lakon for Giovanni Francesco della Mirandola. It was added to the list of New Testament manuscripts by textual critic Johann M. A. Scholz (1794-1852).

Biblical scholar Caspar René Gregory saw it in 1886. The manuscript is presently housed at the Vatican Library (shelf number Vat. gr. 2139) in Rome.

== See also ==
- Minuscule 381
- Minuscule 379
- List of New Testament minuscules
- Biblical manuscript
- Textual criticism
