= Minuscule 304 =

- New Testament manuscript
- Text: Matthew, Mark
- Date: 12th century
- Script: Greek
- Now at: Bibliothèque nationale de France
- Size: 27.5 cm by 21 cm
- Type: Byzantine text-type
- Category: V
- Note: commentary

Minuscule 304 (in the Gregory-Aland numbering), A^{215}C^{μ23} (Soden), is a Greek minuscule manuscript of the New Testament, on parchment. Palaeographically it has been assigned to the 12th century.

== Description ==
The codex contains the text of the Gospel of Matthew and Gospel of Mark on 224 parchment leaves (27.5 cm by 21 cm) with only one lacuna in Mark 14:16-25. The text is written in one column per page, in 31-33 lines per page. The biblical text is surrounded by a catena.

== Text ==
The Greek text of the codex is a representative of the Byzantine text-type. Aland placed it in Category V. According to Hermann von Soden it has Antiocheian commentated text (Antiocheian = Byzantine).

It does not contain the text of the Longer Ending of Mark.

Hermann von Soden lists it as having the "Anonymous Catena" on Matthew (along with 366 and 2482).

== History ==
The manuscript once belonged to Charles de Montchal, Archbishop of Toulouse (1628–1651) and to Theller. It was added to the list of New Testament manuscripts by Scholz (1794–1852). The manuscript was examined by Wettstein and Scholz. It was examined and described by Paulin Martin. C. R. Gregory saw the manuscript in 1885.

Scrivener dated it to the 13th century. Gregory, Soden, and Aland dated it to the 12th century. Currently it is dated by the INTF to the 12th century.

It is cited in critical editions of the Greek New Testament.

The manuscript is currently housed at the Bibliothèque nationale de France (Gr. 194) at Paris.

== See also ==
- List of New Testament minuscules
- Biblical manuscript
- Textual criticism
