= Minuscule 868 =

Manuscript

- New Testament manuscript
- Text: Gospel of Luke †
- Date: 17th century
- Script: Greek
- Now at: Vatican Library
- Size: 39.9 cm by 26.3 cm
- Type: Byzantine text-type
- Category: V
- Note: commentary

Minuscule 868 (in the Gregory-Aland numbering), A^{701} (von Soden), is a 17th-century Greek minuscule manuscript of the New Testament on paper, with a commentary. The manuscript has no complex context.

== Description ==
The codex contains the text of the Gospel of Luke on 624 paper leaves (size 39.9 cm by 26.3 cm), with one lacuna. The text is written in one column per page, 26 lines per page. The biblical text is surrounded by a catena.

== Text ==
The Greek text of the codex is a representative of the Byzantine text-type. Kurt Aland the Greek text of the codex placed in Category V. It was not examined by the Claremont Profile Method. Robert Devreesse suggested ("Chaînes Exégétiques Grecques," Dictionnaire de la Bible, Supplément 1 (1928)) that 868 was copied from 381.

== History ==
F. H. A. Scrivener and C. R. Gregory dated the manuscript to the 17th century. Currently the manuscript is dated by the INTF to the 17th century.

Probably it was rewritten from minuscule 381.

The manuscript was added to the list of New Testament manuscripts by Scrivener (683^{e}) and Gregory (868^{e}). Gregory saw it in 1886.

Currently the manuscript is housed at the Vatican Library (Gr. 1933), in Rome.

== See also ==
- List of New Testament minuscules
- Biblical manuscript
- Textual criticism
- Minuscule 867
- Minuscule 869
