= Minuscule 900 =

- New Testament manuscript
- Text: Gospels
- Date: 13th-century
- Script: Greek
- Found: 1869
- Now at: Uppsala University
- Size: 24 cm by 18 cm
- Type: Byzantine
- Category: V
- Note: marginalia

Minuscule 900 (in the Gregory-Aland numbering), ε 386 (von Soden), is a 13th-century Greek minuscule manuscript of the New Testament on parchment. It has marginalia. The manuscript has survived in complete condition.

== Description ==
The codex contains the text of the four Gospels, on 288 parchment leaves (size 24 cm by 18 cm), with some lacunae. The text is written in one column per page, 22 lines per page. It contains also liturgical books with hagiographies: Synaxarion and Menologion.

The text of the Gospels is divided according to the κεφαλαια (chapters), whose numbers are given at the margin, and their τιτλοι (titles of chapters) at the top of the pages. There is also a division according to the smaller Ammonian Sections (in Mark 234 sections, the last section in Mark 16:9), whose numbers are given at the margin, with references to the Eusebian Canons (written below Ammonian Section numbers).

It contains tables of the κεφαλαια (tables of contains) before each of the Gospels, lectionary markings at the margin (for liturgical use), subscriptions at the end of each of the Gospels, and pictures.

== Text ==
The Greek text of the codex is a representative of the Byzantine. Hermann von Soden classified it to the textual family K^{x}. Kurt Aland placed it in Category V.

According to the Claremont Profile Method it represents the textual family K^{x} in Luke 1 and Luke 20. In Luke 10 no profile was made. It creates a textual cluster with a manuscript 202.

== History ==
According to C. R. Gregory it was written in the 13th or 14th-century. Currently the manuscript is dated by the INTF to the 13th century. It was presented by a Greek priest in 1784 to A. F. Stierzenbecker, who gave it to the University Library in Uppsala. Gregory saw it in 1891.

The manuscript was added to the list of New Testament manuscripts by Scrivener (614^{e}) and Gregory (900^{e}).

It is not cited in critical editions of the Greek New Testament (UBS4, NA28).

The manuscript is housed at the Uppsala University Library (Gr. 9) in Uppsala.

== See also ==
- List of New Testament minuscules (1–1000)
- Biblical manuscript
- Textual criticism
