= Minuscule 820 =

- New Testament manuscript
- Text: Gospels
- Date: 1292
- Script: Greek
- Now at: El Escorial
- Size: 35 cm by 27 cm
- Type: Byzantine text-type
- Category: V
- Note: –

Minuscule 820 (in the Gregory-Aland numbering), Θ^{ε37} (von Soden), is a 13th-century Greek minuscule manuscript of the New Testament on paper, with a commentary.

According to the colophon it was written in 1292.

== Description ==
The codex contains the text of the four Gospels, with a commentary, on 410 paper leaves (size 35 cm by 27 cm). The manuscript is ornamented, the leaves 1-3 were placed after leaf 56.

The text is written in two columns per page, 37-42 lines per page.

It contains a commentary of Theophylact, and subscriptions at the end of each of the Gospels.

== Text ==
The Greek text of the codex is a representative of the Byzantine text-type. Aland placed it in Category V.

It was not examined according to the Claremont Profile Method.

== History ==
The colophon states: "Εγραφη η παρουσα θεοπνευστος βιβλος χειρι του ταπεινου και εθτελους και αναξιου ιερεως Συμεων νομικου και πρωτεκδικου της αγιωτατης μητροπολεως Ροδου, του Καλλιανδρου, εν μηνι οκτωβρ. Ν.ς. τω ςωα ετει. Εγραφη δε τω τιμιωτατω εν μοναχοις Χαρι..." It is deciphered by the INTF as 1292 A.D..

It was briefly described by Emmanuel Miller in 1848, who deciphered date of the colophon as 1293.

It was added to the list of New Testament manuscripts by Gregory (820^{e}).

The manuscript is now housed in El Escorial (Ω. I, 16).

== See also ==
- List of New Testament minuscules
- Biblical manuscript
- Textual criticism
- Minuscule 819
