= Minuscule 195 =

New Testament manuscript

- New Testament manuscript
- Text: Gospels
- Date: 11th
- Script: Greek
- Now at: Laurentian Library
- Size: 27.8 cm by 22 cm
- Type: Byzantine text-type
- Category: V
- Note: marginalia

Minuscule 195 (in the Gregory-Aland numbering), A^{131} (Soden), is a Greek minuscule manuscript of the New Testament, on parchment. Paleographically it has been assigned to the 11th century. It has complex contents and marginalia.

== Description ==
The codex contains a complete text of the four Gospels on 277 thick parchment leaves (size 27.8 cm by 22 cm). The text is written in one column per page, biblical text in 25 lines per page, text of commentary in 50 lines per page, in brown ink.

The text is divided according to the κεφαλαια (chapters), whose numbers are given at the margin, and the τιτλοι (titles of chapters) at the top of the pages. There is also a division according to the Ammonian Sections (in Mark 233 Sections), with references to the Eusebian Canons (written below Ammonian Section numbers).

It contains prolegomena (the same as in codex 186 but briefer, attributed to Eusebius), tables of the κεφαλαια (tables of contents) before each Gospel, synaxaria, Menologion, and a commentary. The commentary to the Gospel of Mark is of authorship of Victorinus of Pettau.

== Text ==
The Greek text of the codex is a representative of the Byzantine text-type. Aland placed it in Category V. It was not examined by Claremont Profile Method.

== History ==
"The date of the year is lost, but the month (May) and indication (8) remain." It once belonged to the Cistercian convent of St. Salvator de Septimo.

It was examined by Birch, Scholz, and Burgon. C. R. Gregory saw it in 1886.

It is currently housed at the Laurentian Library (Plutei. VI. 34), at Florence.

== See also ==
- List of New Testament minuscules
- Biblical manuscript
- Textual criticism
