= Minuscule 363 =

- New Testament manuscript
- Text: New Testament (except Rev.)
- Date: 14th century
- Script: Greek
- Now at: Laurentian Library
- Size: 21 cm by 14.3 cm
- Type: Byzantine text-type
- Category: none
- Note: liturgical use

Minuscule 363 (in the Gregory-Aland numbering), δ 455 (Soden), is a Greek minuscule manuscript of the New Testament, on parchment. Paleographically it has been assigned to the 14th century. It was adapted for liturgical use.

== Description ==
The codex contains the text of the New Testament except Book of Revelation on 306 parchment leaves (21 cm by 14.3 cm) with a catena. It is written in one column per page, in 32 lines per page.

It contains tables of the κεφαλαια (tables of contents) before each book (with a harmony), lectionary markings at the margin (for liturgical use), αναγνωσεις (lessons), subscriptions at the end of each book, numbers of στιχοι, and Euthalian Apparatus (in the Pauline and Catholic epistles).

The order of books: Gospels, Acts, Pauline epistles, Catholic epistles.

== Text ==
The Greek text of the codex is a representative of the Byzantine text-type. Hermann von Soden assigned it to the textual family K^{r}. Aland did not place it to any of Categories. According to the Claremont Profile Method it represents textual family K^{r} in Luke 1, Luke 10, and Luke 20. It also creates the textual pair with minuscule 290.

The Pericope Adulterae (John 7:53-8:11) is marked by an obelus.

== History ==
The manuscript was added to the list of New Testament manuscripts by Scholz (1794–1852). It was examined by Bandini, Scholz, Burgon, and Gregory (1886).

The manuscript is currently housed at the Biblioteca Laurentiana (Plutei VI. 13) in Florence.

== See also ==
- List of New Testament minuscules
- Biblical manuscript
- Textual criticism
