= Minuscule 290 =

- New Testament manuscript
- Text: Gospels
- Date: 14th century
- Script: Greek
- Now at: Bibliothèque nationale de France
- Size: 21.9 cm by 14.5 cm
- Type: Byzantine text-type
- Category: V
- Note: member of K^{r}

Minuscule 290 is a Greek minuscule manuscript of the New Testament, made of paper. It is designated by the siglum 290 in the Gregory-Aland numbering of New Testament manuscripts, and ε 512 in the von Soden numbering of New Testament manuscripts.. Using the study of comparative writing styles (palaeography), it has been assigned to the 15th century. It has marginal notes.

== Description ==
The manuscript is a codex (precursor to the modern book format), containing the complete text of the four Gospels on 259 paper leaves (sized 21.9 cm by 14.5 cm). The text is written in one column per page, in 22 lines per page. The text is divided according to the chapters (known as κεφαλαια / kephalaia), whose numbers are given in the margin.

It contains Argumentum, table of contents (also known as κεφαλαια) before each Gospel with a Gospel harmony, lectionary markings in the margin, lessons (known as αναγνωσεις / anagnoseis), a Synaxarion, and subscriptions at the end of each Gospel, with the numbers of lines (known as στιχοι / stixoi), and numbers of Verses.

== Text ==
The Greek text of the codex is considered to be a representative of the Byzantine text-type. Biblical scholar Hermann von Soden classified it to the textual family K^{r}.

Biblical scholar Kurt Aland placed it in Category V of his New Testament manuscript classification system. Category V manuscripts are described as "manuscripts with a purely or predominantly Byzantine text." According to the Claremont Profile Method (a specific analysis of textual data), it belongs to the textual family K^{r} in Luke 1 and Luke 20, and creates a textual pair with 363.

== History ==
The earliest history of the manuscript is unknown. It was formerly held at Sorbonne University. It was added to the list of New Testament manuscripts by biblical scholar Johann M. A. Scholz (1794–1852).

It was examined by Scholz, and described by scholar Paulin Martin. Biblical scholar Caspar René Gregory saw the manuscript in 1885.

The manuscript is currently dated by the INTF to the 15th century. It is presently located at the National Library of France (shelf number Suppl. Gr. 108) in Paris.

== See also ==
- Minuscule 291
- Minuscule 289
- List of New Testament minuscules
- Biblical manuscript
- Textual criticism
