= Minuscule 756 =

- New Testament manuscript
- Text: Gospels
- Date: 11th century
- Script: Greek
- Now at: Bibliothèque nationale de France
- Size: 19.3 cm by 14.5 cm
- Type: Byzantine text-type
- Category: V
- Note: —

Minuscule 756 (in the Gregory-Aland numbering), ε1128 (von Soden), is a Greek minuscule manuscript of the New Testament written on parchment. Palaeographically it has been assigned to the 11th century. The manuscript has no complex contents. Scrivener labelled it as 772^{e}.

== Description ==
The codex contains the text of the four Gospels, on 179 parchment leaves (size 19.3 cm by 14.5 cm), with some lacunae (Matthew 5:1-6:15; 6:29-8:12; John 4:31-21:25). The leaves are arranged in quarto (four leaves in quire).

The text is written in one column per page, 21 lines per page. It contains lectionary markings at the margin for liturgical use.

== Text ==
The Greek text of the codex is a representative of the Byzantine text-type. Hermann von Soden classified it as K text, established by Lucian of Antioch ca. 300 A.D. Aland placed it in Category V.

According to the Claremont Profile Method it represents textual family K^{x} in Luke 1, Luke 10, and Luke 20.

== History ==
Scrivener and Gregory dated the manuscript to the 11th century. The manuscript is currently dated by the INTF to the 11th century.

The manuscript was written by Michael, a scribe; it belonged to Stephanus, a scribe. In 1892 it was held in Athens.

It was added to the list of New Testament manuscripts by Scrivener (772) and Gregory (756).

The manuscript is now housed at the Bibliothèque nationale de France (Suppl. Gr. 1083) in Paris.

== See also ==
- List of New Testament minuscules
- Biblical manuscript
- Textual criticism
- Minuscule 755
