= Minuscule 111 =

- New Testament manuscript
- Text: Gospels
- Date: 12th century
- Script: Greek
- Now at: Bodleian Library
- Size: 21 cm by 15.4 cm
- Type: Byzantine text-type
- Category: V
- Note: marginalia

Minuscule 111 (in the Gregory-Aland numbering), ε 267 (Soden), is a Greek minuscule manuscript of the New Testament, on parchment leaves. Palaeographically it has been assigned to the 12th century. It has complex contents. Marginalia are incomplete.

== Description ==
The codex contains the text of the four Gospels on 181 parchment leaves (21 cm by 15.4 cm). The text is written in one column per page, 31 lines per page.

The text is divided according to the κεφαλαια (chapters), whose numbers are given at the margin, and their τιτλοι (titles) at the top of the pages. There is also another division according to the Ammonian Sections, but without references to the Eusebian Canons.

It contains the tables of the κεφαλαια (tables of contents) before each Gospel, lectionary markings at the beginning (for liturgical use), subscriptions at the end of each Gospel, and numbers of stichoi. It has some lacunae in John 16:27-17:15; 20:25-21:25.

== Text ==
The Greek text of the codex is a representative of the Byzantine text-type. Aland placed it in Category V.

According to the Claremont Profile Method it represents textual family K^{x} in Luke 1 and Luke 20. In Luke 10 no profile was made. It belongs to the textual cluster 281.

== History ==
Nicoll (?) collated some places for Scholz. C. R. Gregory saw it in 1883.

It is housed at the Bodleian Library (E. D. Clarke 7) at Oxford.

== See also ==
- List of New Testament minuscules
- Biblical manuscript
- Textual criticism
