= Minuscule 724 =

- New Testament manuscript
- Text: Gospels
- Date: 1520
- Script: Greek
- Now at: Austrian National Library
- Size: 14.2 cm by 10 cm
- Type: Byzantine text-type
- Category: V
- Note: –

Minuscule 724 (in the Gregory-Aland numbering), ε530 (von Soden), is a Greek minuscule manuscript of the New Testament written on parchment and partially on paper. It is dated by a Colophon to 1520 CE. The manuscript has complex contents. Scrivener labelled it as 829^{e}.

== Description ==
The codex contains the text of the four Gospels on 203 parchment and paper leaves (size 14.2 cm by 10 cm).

The text is written in single columns per page, 22 lines per page.

The text is divided according to the κεφαλαια (chapters), Greek and Latin, but there are no τιτλοι (titles) at the top or bottom.

It contains lists of the κεφαλαια (tables of contents) with a harmony before each Gospel, subscriptions at the end, and Pseudo-Dorotheus Lives of the Evangelists.

== Text ==
The Greek text of the codex is a representative of the Byzantine text-type. Aland placed it in Category V.

It was not examined by using Claremont Profile Method.

== History ==
Gregory dated the manuscript to the 15th century. The manuscript is currently dated by the INTF to the year 1520.

It was added to the list of New Testament manuscripts by Scrivener (829) and Gregory (724). Gregory saw the manuscript in 1887.

The manuscript is now housed at the Austrian National Library (Suppl. gr. 175) in Vienna.

== See also ==
- List of New Testament minuscules
- Biblical manuscript
- Textual criticism
