= Minuscule 739 =

- New Testament manuscript
- Text: Gospel of Luke
- Date: 15th century
- Script: Greek
- Now at: Bibliothèque nationale de France
- Size: 34.2 cm by 22.7 cm
- Type: Byzantine text-type
- Category: V
- Note: commentary

Minuscule 739 (in the Gregory-Aland numbering), Θ^{ε413} (von Soden), is a Greek minuscule manuscript of the New Testament written on parchment. Palaeographically it has been assigned to the 15th century. The manuscript has no complex contents. Scrivener labelled it as 757^{e}.

== Description ==
The codex contains the text of the Gospel of Luke, on 48 parchment leaves (size 34.2 cm by 22.7 cm), with lacunae. The text is written in one column per page, 34-37 lines per page.

It contains texts: Luke 1:1-12; 5:27-6:11; 9:45-50; 11:33-38.52-fin.

It has a commentary of Theophylact.

== Text ==
The Greek text of the codex is a representative of the Byzantine text-type. Aland placed it in Category V. It was not examined by using the Claremont Profile Method.

== History ==
Scrivener and Gregory dated the manuscript to the 15th century. The manuscript is currently dated by the INTF to the 15th century.

The manuscript was added to the list of New Testament manuscripts by Scrivener (757) and Gregory (739). It was examined and described by Paulin Martin. Gregory saw the manuscript in 1885.

The manuscript is now housed at the Bibliothèque nationale de France (Gr. 207) in Paris.

== See also ==
- List of New Testament minuscules
- Biblical manuscript
- Textual criticism
- Minuscule 741
