= Minuscule 887 =

- New Testament manuscript
- Name: Cod. Regin. grec. 9
- Text: Gospel of John
- Date: 11th century
- Script: Greek
- Now at: Vatican Library
- Size: 34.6 cm by 24.5 cm
- Type: Byzantine
- Category: V

Minuscule 887 (in the Gregory-Aland numbering), is an 11th-century Greek minuscule manuscript of the New Testament on parchment, with a commentary.

== Description ==
The codex contains the text of the Gospel of John, with a commentary, on 197 parchment leaves (size 34.6 cm by 24.5 cm). The text is written in one column per page, 38 lines per page.

== Text ==
The Greek text of the codex is a representative of the Byzantine. Kurt Aland placed it in Category V.

== History ==
According to F. H. A. Scrivener and C. R. Gregory it was written in the 11th century. Henry Stevenson dated it to the 10th century. Currently the manuscript is dated by the INTF to the 11th century.

It once belonged to Matariotes, a metropolitan. The manuscript was described by Henry Stevenson. Gregory saw it in 1886.

The manuscript was added to the list of New Testament manuscripts by Scrivener (699^{e}), Gregory (887^{e}).

Currently the manuscript is housed at the Vatican Library (Reg. gr. 9), in Rome.

== See also ==
- List of New Testament minuscules (1–1000)
- Biblical manuscript
- Textual criticism
