= Minuscule 337 =

- New Testament manuscript
- Text: New Testament (except Gospels)
- Date: 12th century
- Script: Greek
- Now at: Bibliothèque nationale de France
- Size: 25.3 cm by 16.3 cm
- Type: Byzantine text-type
- Category: V
- Note: marginalia

Minuscule 337 (in the Gregory-Aland numbering), ε 205 (Soden), is a Greek minuscule manuscript of the New Testament, on parchment. Paleographically it has been assigned to the 12th century. Formerly it was labelled by 51^{a}, 133^{p}, and 52^{r}. It has marginalia.

== Description ==
The codex contains the text of the New Testament (except Gospels) on 375 parchment leaves (25.3 cm by 16.3 cm) with lacunae (Acts 5:5-26; 7:56-8:8; 9:37-10:4; Rev. 10:4-11:1; 22:17-21). The text is written in one column per page, in 23 lines per page.

The text is divided according to the κεφαλαια (chapters), whose numbers are given at the margin.

It contains Prolegomena to the Catholic and Pauline epistles, lectionary markings at the margin (for liturgical use), and subscriptions in the Pauline epistles (at the end of each epistle).

At the end of the Epistle to the Romans it has subscription: εγραφη η προς Ρωμαιους επιστολη δια Τερτιου επεμφτη δε δια Φοιβης απο Κορινθιων.

== Text ==
The Greek text of the codex is a representative of the Byzantine text-type. Aland placed it in Category V.

== History ==
The manuscript once belonged to Mazarin. It was and described examined by Scholz and Paulin Martin. C. R. Gregory saw the manuscript in 1885. Scholz collated it entirely.

The manuscript was added to the list of the New Testament manuscripts by Scholz (1794-1852).

Formerly it was labelled by 51^{a}, 133^{p}, and 52^{r}. Gregory in 1908 gave the number 337 to it.

The manuscript is currently housed at the Bibliothèque nationale de France (Gr. 56) in Paris.

== See also ==
- List of New Testament minuscules
- Biblical manuscript
- Textual criticism
