= Minuscule 916 =

- New Testament manuscript
- Text: Book of Acts †
- Date: 12th century
- Script: Greek
- Now at: Escurial
- Size: 26.8 cm by 19.3 cm
- Type: Byzantine text-type
- Category: V

Minuscule 916 (in the Gregory-Aland numbering), Ο^{πρ20} (von Soden), is a 12th-century Greek minuscule manuscript of the New Testament on parchment. The manuscript has not survived in complete condition.

== Description ==
The codex contains the text of the Book of Acts, on 32 parchment leaves (size 26.8 cm by 19.3 cm) with lacuna after Acts 10:47.

The text is written in one column per page, and 15-25 lines per page.

It contains lectionary markings at the margin and scholia (since Acts 1:1 to 7:60).

The original manuscript contained complete text of the Book of Acts and Catholic epistles.

== Text ==
Kurt Aland the Greek text of the codex placed in Category V. It means it is a representative of the Byzantine text-type.

== History ==
According to C. R. Gregory the manuscript was written in the 12th century. Currently the manuscript is dated by the INTF to the 12th century.

It was described by Montana, who sent a description to Mr. Kelly.

The manuscript was added to the list of New Testament manuscripts by Scrivener (204^{a}) and Gregory (232^{a}). In 1908 Gregory gave the number 916 to it.

It is currently housed in the Biblioteca de El Escorial (C. III. 3) in Escurial.

== See also ==
- List of New Testament minuscules
- Biblical manuscript
- Textual criticism
