= Minuscule 624 =

- New Testament manuscript
- Text: Acts, Catholic epistles, Paul †
- Date: 11th century
- Script: Greek
- Now at: Vatican Library
- Size: 21.8 cm by 17.2 cm
- Type: Byzantine text-type
- Category: V

Minuscule 624 (in the Gregory-Aland numbering), α 191 (von Soden), is a Greek minuscule manuscript of the New Testament, on parchment. Palaeographically it has been assigned to the 11th century. The manuscript is very lacunose. Tischendorf labeled it by 157^{a} and 191^{p}.

== Description ==
The codex contains the text of the Acts, Catholic epistles, and Pauline epistles on 46 parchment leaves (size 21.8 cm by 17.2 cm) with numerous lacunae. The text is written in one column per page, 25 lines per page.

It contains Prolegomena, tables of the κεφαλαια (tables of contents) before each book, numbers of the κεφαλαια (chapters) at the margin, the τιτλοι (titles of chapters) at the top, lectionary markings at the margin, incipits, αναγνωσεις (lessons), subscriptions at the end of each book, and numbers of στιχοι.

Contents
Acts 7:33-57; 10:17-40; 18:14-19,9; 20:15-21:1; 23:20-27:34; James 1:1-5:20; 1 Peter 1:1-3:1; 4:4-5:12; 1 John 4:14-5:21; 2 John; 3 John; Jude υποθεσις; Romans 1:1-4:13; 5:16-16:23; 1 Corinthians 1:1-7:28.

The order of books: Acts, Catholic epistles, and Pauline epistles.

== Text ==
The Greek text of the codex is a representative of the Byzantine text-type. Aland placed it in Category V.

== History ==
The manuscript was added to the list of New Testament manuscripts by Johann Martin Augustin Scholz. Gregory saw it in 1886, but he did not examine it thoroughly.

Formerly it was labeled by 157^{a} and 191^{p}. In 1908 Gregory gave the number 624 to it.

The manuscript currently is housed at the Vatican Library (Vat. gr. 1714), at Rome.

== See also ==
- List of New Testament minuscules
- Biblical manuscript
- Textual criticism
