= Minuscule 432 =

- New Testament manuscript
- Text: New Testament (except Gospels)
- Date: 14th century
- Script: Greek
- Now at: Vatican Library
- Size: 19.5 cm by 13.5 cm
- Type: Byzantine text-type
- Category: V

Minuscule 432 (in the Gregory-Aland numbering), α 501 (in the Soden numbering), is a Greek minuscule manuscript of the New Testament, on paper. Palaeographically it has been assigned to the 14th century. Formerly it was labelled by 72^{e}, 79^{p}, and 37^{r}.

== Description ==
The codex contains the text of the New Testament except the Gospels on 218 paper leaves (19.5 cm by 13.5 cm). It is written in one column per page, in 24 lines per page. It contains Prolegomena.

The order of books: Acts, Catholic epistles, Pauline epistles (Philemon, Hebrews), and Apocalypse.

== Text ==
The Greek text of the codex is a representative of the Byzantine text-type. Aland placed it in Category V.

== History ==
Birch dated the manuscript to the 13th century, Gregory to the 15th century. Currently it is dated by the INTF to the 14th century.

Peltanus used this manuscript in 1580 in Ingolstadt. The manuscript was examined by Birch and Delitzsch. The manuscript was added to the list of New Testament manuscripts by Scholz (1794–1852). C. R. Gregory saw it in 1886.

Formerly it was labelled by 72^{a}, 79^{p}, and 37^{r}. In 1908 Gregory gave the number 432 to it.

It is currently housed at the Vatican Library (Vat. gr. 366) in Rome.

== See also ==
- List of New Testament minuscules
- Biblical manuscript
- Textual criticism
