= Minuscule 374 =

- New Testament manuscript
- Text: Gospels
- Date: 11th century
- Script: Greek
- Now at: Vatican Library
- Size: 29.2 cm by 21.4 cm
- Type: Byzantine text-type
- Category: V
- Note: marginalia

Minuscule 374 (in the Gregory-Aland numbering), A^{204} (Soden), is a Greek minuscule manuscript of the New Testament, on parchment. Palaeographically it has been assigned to the 11th century. The manuscript has complex contents. It has some marginalia.

== Description ==
The codex contains the text of the four Gospels on 173 parchment leaves (29.2 cm by 21.4 cm) with a commentary. The text is written in one column per page, in 45 lines per page.

The commentary to the Gospel of Mark is of the authorship of Victorinus, commentaries to the rest of the Gospels are of the authorship of Peter of Laodicea. It contains the Eusebian tables and pictures. Lists of the κεφαλαια (tables of contents) before each Gospel, numbers of the κεφαλαια (chapters), and the τιτλοι (titles) were added by a later hand.

== Text ==
The Greek text of the codex is a representative of the Byzantine text-type. Aland placed it in Category V. According to the Claremont Profile Method it has mixed Byzantine text in Luke 1. In Luke 10 and Luke 20 no profile was made.

== History ==
The manuscript in 1215 belonged to one John from Theodosiopolis (in Asia Minor). The manuscript was added to the list of New Testament manuscripts by Scholz (1794-1852). It was examined by Dean Burgon. C. R. Gregory saw it in 1886.

The manuscript is currently housed at the Vatican Library (Vat. gr. 1445) in Rome.

== See also ==
- List of New Testament minuscules
- Biblical manuscript
- Textual criticism
