= Minuscule 320 =

- New Testament manuscript
- Text: Luke
- Date: 12th century
- Script: Greek
- Now at: National Library of France
- Size: 22.9 cm by 17.3 cm
- Type: Byzantine text-type
- Category: V
- Note: marginalia

Minuscule 320 is a Greek minuscule manuscript of the New Testament, made of parchment. It is designated by the siglum 320 in the Gregory-Aland numbering of New Testament manuscripts, and Θ^{ε26} in the von Soden numbering of New Testament manuscripts. Using the study of comparative writing styles (palaeography), it has been assigned to the 12th century. It has marginal notes.

== Description ==
The manuscript is a codex (precursor to the modern book format), containing the text of the Gospel of Luke on 392 parchment leaves (sized 22.9 cm by 17.3 cm). The text is written in one column per page, in 21 lines per page. Initial letters are written in red ink.

The text is divided according to the chapters (known as κεφαλαια / kephalaia), whose numbers are given in the margin, and their titles (known as τιτλοι / titloi) written at the top of the pages. Before the text of the Gospel it contains the chapter table (also known as κεφαλαια), and the biblical text is interspersed between a catena commentary text.

== Text ==
The Greek text of the codex is considered to be a representative of the Byzantine text-type. Biblical scholar Kurt Aland placed it in Category V of his New Testament manuscript classification system. Category V manuscripts are described as "manuscripts with a purely or predominantly Byzantine text." It was not examined by the Claremont Profile Method (a specific analysis of textual data).

== History ==
The earliest history of the manuscript is unknown. It was added to the list of New Testament manuscripts by textual critic Johann M. A. Scholz (1794–1852). It was examined and described by scholar Paulin Martin. Biblical scholar Caspar René Gregory saw the manuscript in 1885.

The manuscript is currently dated by the INTF to the 12th century. It is presently located at the National Library of France (shelf number Gr. 232) in Paris.

== See also ==
- List of New Testament minuscules
- Biblical manuscript
- Textual criticism
