= Minuscule 417 =

- New Testament manuscript
- Text: Gospels †
- Date: 14th century
- Script: Greek
- Now at: Biblioteca Marciana
- Size: 23 cm by 14.7 cm
- Type: Byzantine text-type
- Category: V
- Note: full marginalia

Minuscule 417 (in the Gregory-Aland numbering), ε 423 (in the Soden numbering), is a Greek minuscule manuscript of the New Testament, on parchment. Palaeographically it has been assigned to the 14th century. It has full marginalia.

== Description ==
The codex contains the text of the first three Gospels on 112 parchment leaves (23 cm by 14.7 cm) with two large lacunae at the beginning and end. The text of the manuscript begins at Matthew 5:44 and ends at Luke 6:9. The text is written in one column per page, in 21-29 lines per page.

The text is divided according to the κεφαλαια (chapters), whose numbers are given at the margin, and their τιτλοι (titles) at the top of the pages. There is also a division according to the Ammonian Sections (in Mark 234 Sections, the last in 16:9), with references to the Eusebian Canons (written below Ammonian Section numbers).

It contains lectionary markings at the margin (added by a later hand), and subscriptions at the end of each Gospel (some of them from later hand).

== Text ==
The Greek text of the codex is a representative of the Byzantine text-type. Aland placed it in Category V. It was not examined by Claremont Profile Method.

== History ==
Wiedmann and J. G. J. Braun collated some portions of the manuscript for Scholz (1794-1852). The manuscript was added to the list of New Testament manuscripts by Scholz. C. R. Gregory saw it in 1886.

The manuscript is currently housed at the Biblioteca Marciana (Gr. I. 25) in Venice.

== See also ==
- List of New Testament minuscules
- Biblical manuscript
- Textual criticism
