= Minuscule 316 =

- New Testament manuscript
- Text: Luke 18:18-24:53; John 1:16-12:25
- Date: 14th century
- Script: Greek
- Now at: Bibliothèque nationale de France
- Size: 34 cm by 22 cm
- Type: Byzantine text-type
- Category: V
- Note: marginalia

Minuscule 316 (in the Gregory-Aland numbering), O^{ε321} (Soden), is a Greek minuscule manuscript of the New Testament, on cotton paper. Palaeographically it has been assigned to the 14th century. The manuscript has no complex contents. It has marginalia.

== Description ==
The codex contains the text of the Gospel of Luke (18:18-24:53) and John 1:16-12:25 on 129 paper leaves (34 cm by 22 cm). The text is written in one column per page, in 33 lines per page.

The text is divided according to the κεφαλαια (chapters), whose numbers are given at the margin, and their τιτλοι (titles) at the top of the pages. The biblical text is surrounded by a catena.

== Text ==
The Greek text of the codex is a representative of the Byzantine text-type. Aland placed it in Category V. It was not examined by the Claremont Profile Method.

== History ==
The manuscript came from Constantinople. It was added to the list of New Testament manuscripts by Scholz (1794–1852). It was examined and described by Paulin Martin. C. R. Gregory saw the manuscript in 1885.

The manuscript is currently housed at the Bibliothèque nationale de France (Gr. 211) at Paris.

== See also ==
- List of New Testament minuscules
- Biblical manuscript
- Textual criticism
