= Minuscule 717 =

- New Testament manuscript
- Text: Gospels
- Date: 11th/12th century
- Script: Greek
- Now at: British Library
- Size: 16.3 cm by 12 cm
- Type: Byzantine text-type
- Category: V
- Note: –

Minuscule 717 (in the Gregory-Aland numbering), ε274 (von Soden), is a Greek minuscule manuscript of the New Testament, on parchment. Palaeographically it has been assigned to the 11th or 12th century. The manuscript has complex contents.

== Description ==
The codex contains the text of the four Gospels, on 277 parchment leaves (size 16.3 cm by 12 cm).

The text is written in one column per page, 21 lines per page. The text is divided according to the κεφαλαια (chapters), whose numbers are given at the left margin of the text and their τιτλοι (titles) are given at the top. The text is also divided according to the smaller Ammonian Sections (in Mark 240, the last section in 16:19), whose numbers are given at the margin, but there are not a references to the Eusebian Canons.

The manuscript contains Epistula ad Carpianum, the Eusebian Canon tables at the beginning. It contains lectionary markings at the margin, Synaxarion, Menologion, subscriptions at the end, and pictures.

== Text ==
The Greek text of the codex is a representative of the Byzantine text-type. Hermann von Soden classified it to the textual family K^{x}. Kurt Aland placed it in Category V.

According to the Claremont Profile Method it represents K^{x} in Luke 1 and Luke 10. In Luke 20 no profile was made.

== History ==
Gregory dated the manuscript to the 13th century. Currently the manuscript is dated by the INTF to the 11th or 12th century.

The manuscript once belonged to the monk Gerasimus.

It was added to the list of New Testament manuscripts by Gregory (717). Gregory saw the manuscript in 1883.

At present the manuscript is housed at the British Library (Cheltenham) in London.

== See also ==
- List of New Testament minuscules
- Biblical manuscript
- Textual criticism
