= Minuscule 648 =

Greek minuscule manuscript of the New Testament

- New Testament manuscript
- Text: Gospels †
- Date: 14th century
- Script: Greek
- Now at: National Library of Greece
- Size: 25 cm by 18 cm
- Type: Byzantine text-type
- Category: V

Minuscule 648 (in the Gregory-Aland numbering), ε 482 (von Soden), is a Greek minuscule manuscript of the New Testament, on parchment. Palaeographically it has been assigned to the 14th century. The manuscript is lacunose. Scrivener labelled it by 724^{e}.

== Description ==
The codex contains the text of the four Gospels, on 227 parchment leaves (size 25 cm by 18 cm), with some lacunae at the end of Mark, beginning and end of Luke, many places in John. It is written in one column per page, 23 lines per page. It contains tables of the κεφαλαια (chapters), lectionary markings, incipits, and subscriptions.

== Text ==
The Greek text of the codex is a representative of the Byzantine text-type. Kurt Aland placed it in Category V. It was not examined by using Claremont Profile Method.

== History ==
Scrivener and Gregory dated the manuscript to the 14th century. The manuscript is dated by the INTF to the 14th century.

Formerly the manuscript was held in Constantinople (Hagia Taphu 574). The manuscript was added to the list of New Testament manuscripts by Scrivener. Gregory saw the manuscript in 1886.

The manuscript currently is housed at the National Library of Greece (Taphu 282), at Athens.

== See also ==
- List of New Testament minuscules
- Biblical manuscript
- Textual criticism
