= Minuscule 919 =

- New Testament manuscript
- Text: Book of Acts, Pauline epistles, Book of Revelation †
- Date: 11th century
- Script: Greek
- Now at: Escurial
- Size: 24.5 cm by 19.8 cm
- Type: Byzantine text-type
- Category: V

Minuscule 919 (in the Gregory-Aland numbering), α113 (von Soden), is an 11th-century Greek minuscule manuscript of the New Testament on parchment. The manuscript has not survived in complete condition.

== Description ==
The codex contains the text of the Book of Acts, Catholic epistles, Pauline epistles, and Book of Revelation, on 265 parchment leaves (size 24.5 cm by 19.8 cm) with some lacunae. The texts of Acts 15:6-18:19; James 1:21-1 Peter 3:6; Romans 6:9-11:26 were supplied by later hand. It lacks texts of James 1:23-2:6; Titus 3:11-Philemon 16; Apocalypse 19:-fin.

The text is written in one column per page, and 23 lines per page.

It contains lectionary markings at the margin for liturgical ruse and scholia added by several other hands.

== Text ==
Kurt Aland the Greek text of the codex placed in Category V. This means it is a representative of the Byzantine text-type.

== History ==
According to C. R. Gregory the manuscript was written in the 12th century. Currently the manuscript is dated by the INTF to the 11th century.

It was described by Montana, who sent a description to Kelly.

The manuscript was added to the list of New Testament manuscripts by Scrivener (207^{a}) and Gregory (235^{a}, 125^{r}). In 1908 Gregory gave the number 919 to it.

It is currently housed in the Biblioteca de El Escorial (Y. III. 6) in Escurial.

== See also ==
- List of New Testament minuscules
- Biblical manuscript
- Textual criticism
