= Minuscule 308 =

- New Testament manuscript
- Text: Paul, Acts †
- Date: 14th century
- Script: Greek
- Now at: British Library
- Size: 21 cm by 18 cm
- Type: Byzantine text-type
- Category: V
- Note: in bad condition

Minuscule 308 (in the Gregory-Aland numbering), α 456 (Soden), is a Greek minuscule manuscript of the New Testament, on paper. Palaeographically it has been assigned to the 14th century. Formerly it was labelled by 20^{a} and 25^{p}.

== Description ==
The codex contains the text of the Acts of the Apostles, Catholic epistles, and Pauline epistles on 145 paper leaves (21 cm by 18 cm) with numerous lacunae. The text is written in one column per page, in 22-23 lines per page.

It contains Prolegomena to the Catholic epistles and subscriptions at the end of each sacred book. The manuscript has survived in bad condition and almost illegible in some parts. The Pauline epistles precede the Acts and Catholic epistles.

== Text ==
The Greek text of the codex is a representative of the Byzantine text-type. Aland placed it in Category V.

== History ==
The manuscript was examined by Wettstein and Casley. C. R. Gregory saw it in 1883.

Formerly it was labelled by 20^{a} and 25^{p}. Gregory in 1908 gave number 308 for it.

The manuscript is currently housed at the British Library (Royal MS 1 B. I) in London.

== See also ==
- List of New Testament minuscules
- Biblical manuscript
- Textual criticism
