= Minuscule 666 =

- New Testament manuscript
- Text: Gospels †
- Date: 13th century
- Script: Greek
- Now at: Harvard University Library
- Size: 22 cm by 15 cm
- Type: Byzantine text-type
- Category: V

Minuscule 666 (in the Gregory-Aland numbering), ε 1293 (von Soden), is a Greek minuscule manuscript of the New Testament, on parchment. Palaeographically it has been assigned to the 13th century. The manuscript is lacunose. Scrivener labelled it by 899^{e}.

== Description ==
The codex contains the entire of the four Gospels, on 298 parchment leaves (size 22 cm by 15 cm) with some lacunae. The text of John 3:4-18; 5:12-6:7; 7:2-21:25.

The text is written in one column per page, 23-24 lines per page.

The text is divided according to the κεφαλαια (chapters), whose numbers are given at the margin, with τιτλοι (titles) at the top. There are the Ammonian Sections are given at the margin to the Gospel of Matthew, but only from number α' to number κβ'.

It contains Prolegomena, lists of the κεφαλαια are placed before each of the Gospels, portrait of Evangelists before every Gospel. Lectionary markings and subscriptions to the Gospel of John were added by a later hand.

== Text ==
The Greek text of the codex is a representative of the Byzantine text-type. Kurt Aland placed it in Category V.

According to the Claremont Profile Method it belongs to the textual family K^{x} in Luke 1; 10; 20.

== History ==
Gregory dated the manuscript to the 12th or 13th century. Currently the manuscript is dated by the INTF to the 13th century.

The manuscript came to USA from Albania.

Gregory saw the manuscript in 1889.

Currently the manuscript is housed at the Harvard University Library (Ms. Gr. 1), in Cambridge, Massachusetts.

== See also ==
- List of New Testament minuscules
- Biblical manuscript
- Textual criticism
