= Minuscule 335 =

- New Testament manuscript
- Text: Gospels
- Date: 16th century
- Script: Greek
- Now at: Turin National University Library
- Size: 28.5 cm by 21.7 cm
- Type: Byzantine text-type
- Category: V

Minuscule 335 (in the Gregory-Aland numbering), ε 601 (Soden), is a Greek minuscule manuscript of the New Testament, on paper. Paleographically it has been assigned to the 16th century.

== Description ==
The codex contains a complete text of the four Gospels on 112 paper leaves (28.5 cm by 21.7 cm). The text is written in one column per page, in 29 lines per page. It contains Prolegomena and Argumentum. It has numbers of stichoi to the Gospel of Matthew.

== Text ==
The Greek text of the codex is a representative of the Byzantine text-type. Aland placed it in Category V.

It was non examined by the Claremont Profile Method.

== History ==
The manuscript was examined by Pasino, Scholz, and Burgon. It was added to the list of New Testament manuscripts by Scholz (1794–1852). C. R. Gregory saw it in 1886.

The manuscript is currently housed at the Turin National University Library (B. III. 2) in Turin.

== See also ==
- List of New Testament minuscules
- Biblical manuscript
- Textual criticism
