= Minuscule 334 =

- New Testament manuscript
- Text: Matthew, Mark
- Date: 12th century
- Script: Greek
- Now at: Turin National University Library
- Size: 28 cm by 21 cm
- Type: Byzantine text-type
- Category: V
- Note: marginalia

Minuscule 334 (in the Gregory-Aland numbering), Z^{ε22} (Soden), is a Greek minuscule manuscript of the New Testament, on parchment. Paleographically it has been assigned to the 12th century. It has marginalia.

== Description ==
The codex contains the text of the Gospel of Matthew and Gospel of Mark on 271 parchment leaves (28 cm by 21 cm) with a commentary. The text is written in one column per page, in 30 lines per page. The biblical text is surrounded by a catenae.

The text is divided according to the κεφαλαια (chapters), whose numbers are given at the margin, and the τιτλοι (titles of chapters) at the top of the pages.

It contains Prolegomena, the tables of the κεφαλαια (tables of contents) before each Gospel.

== Text ==
The Greek text of the codex is a representative of the Byzantine text-type. Aland placed it in Category V.

== History ==
The manuscript was added to the list of New Testament manuscripts by Scholz (1794–1852). It was examined by Burgon. C. R. Gregory saw it in 1886.

The manuscript is currently housed at the Turin National University Library (B. III. 8) in Turin.

== See also ==
- List of New Testament minuscules
- Biblical manuscript
- Textual criticism
