= Uncial 0248 =

- New Testament manuscript
- Text: Matthew †
- Date: 9th century
- Script: Greek
- Now at: Bodleian Library
- Size: 21 cm by 15.5 cm
- Type: Byzantine text-type
- Category: V

Uncial 0248 (in the Gregory-Aland numbering), is a Greek uncial manuscript of the New Testament. Paleographically it has been assigned to the 9th century.

== Description ==
The codex contains the text of the Gospel of Matthew 1; 12-14; 19-21, on 70 parchment leaves (21 cm by 15.5 cm), with some lacunae. It is written in two columns per page, 24 lines per page, in uncial letters.

It is a palimpsest, twice rewritten.

Currently it is dated by the INTF to the 9th century.

== Location ==
Currently the codex is housed at the Bodleian Library (MS. Auct. T. 4.21) in Oxford.

== Text ==
The Greek text of this codex is a representative of the Byzantine text-type. Aland placed it in Category V.

== See also ==
- List of New Testament uncials
- Textual criticism
