= Minuscule 276 =

- New Testament manuscript
- Text: Gospels
- Date: 1092
- Script: Greek
- Now at: Bibliothèque nationale de France
- Size: 20.1 cm by 14.5 cm
- Type: Byzantine text-type
- Category: V
- Note: full marginalia

Minuscule 276 (in the Gregory-Aland numbering), ε 163 (Soden), is a Greek minuscule manuscript of the New Testament, on parchment. It is dated by a colophon to the year 1092. It has full marginalia.

== Description ==
The codex contains the text of the four Gospels on 307 parchment leaves (20.1 cm by 14.5 cm). The text is written in one column per page, in 21 lines per page.

The text is divided according to the κεφαλαια (chapters), whose numbers are given at the margin, and their τιτλοι (titles of chapters) at the top of the pages. There is also another division according to the smaller Ammonian Sections (in Mark 233 sections, the last in 16:8), whose numbers are given at the margin with references to the Eusebian Canons (written below Ammonian Section numbers).

It contains the Eusebian Canon tables, tables of the κεφαλαια (tables of contents) before each Gospel, lectionary markings at the margin (for liturgical reading), and pictures.

== Text ==
The Greek text of the codex is a representative of the Byzantine text-type. Aland placed it in Category V.

According to the Claremont Profile Method it creates a textual cluster 276 in Luke 1, Luke 10, and Luke 20.

== History ==
The colophon states:

εγραψα χριστε τους ζωηφορους λογους ους αυτους εξεδωκας τοις αποστολοις κηρυξαι τουτους εις τον συμπαντα κοσμον αφες δεσποτα τα εμοι πεπραγμενα ωικηφορω τλημονι τω ταλαιπωρω, ος της μονης υπαρχω της μελετιου του τρις μακαρος τω βιω και τη πραξει βλεψον και τω κτητορι την δε την βιβλον. ιλεω σου ομματι ως ελεημων δανιηλ τε μοναχω τω ποθουντι σε λιταις σης μητρος της τεκουσης ασπορης και των τετταρων και σοφων ευαγγελιστων.

The manuscript was written by Nicephorus of the monastery Meletius. The manuscript was added to the list of New Testament manuscripts by Scholz (1794-1852). It was examined and described by Paulin Martin. and Henri Omont. C. R. Gregory saw the manuscript in 1885.

The manuscript is currently housed at the Bibliothèque nationale de France (Gr. 81) at Paris.

== See also ==
- List of New Testament minuscules
- Biblical manuscript
- Textual criticism
