= Minuscule 302 =

- New Testament manuscript
- Text: Acts, Cath., Paul
- Date: 11th century
- Script: Greek
- Now at: Bibliothèque nationale de France
- Size: 21.5 cm by 17 cm
- Type: Byzantine text-type
- Category: V

Minuscule 302 (in the Gregory-Aland numbering), α 302 (Soden), is a Greek minuscule manuscript of the New Testament, on parchment. Palaeographically it has been assigned to the 11th century. The manuscript is lacunose. Formerly it was labelled by 11^{a} and 140^{p}.

== Description ==
The codex contains the text of the Acts of the Apostles, Catholic epistles, and Pauline epistles on 333 parchment leaves (21.5 cm by 17 cm) with lacunae (Acts 2:20-31; 1 Corinthians 12:17-13:2; Hebrews 11:35-13:25). The text is written in one column per page, in 18 lines per page.

It contains Prolegomena, with scholia. The Hebrews is placed between 2 Thessalonians and 1 Timothy. The text of Hebrews 11:35-12:1 was supplied by a later hand.

== Text ==
The Greek text of the codex is a representative of the Byzantine text-type. Aland placed it in Category V.

== History ==
Wettstein slightly examined Acts of the Apostles and Catholic epistles of the manuscript. Reiche and Scholz examined Pauline epistles. The manuscript was also examined by Paulin Martin and C. R. Gregory, who saw the manuscript in 1885.

Formerly it was labelled by 11^{a} and 140^{p}. In 1908 Gregory gave number 302 for it.

The manuscript is currently housed at the Bibliothèque nationale de France (Gr. 103) at Paris.

== See also ==
- List of New Testament minuscules
- Biblical manuscript
- Textual criticism
