= Minuscule 684 =

- New Testament manuscript
- Text: Gospels
- Date: 14th century
- Script: Greek
- Now at: Bodleian Library
- Size: 29 cm by 21.5 cm
- Type: Byzantine text-type
- Category: V

Minuscule 684 (in the Gregory-Aland numbering), Θ^{ε34} (von Soden), is a Greek minuscule manuscript of the New Testament, on parchment. It is dated by a colophon to the year 1228. The manuscript has complex contents. Scrivener labelled it by 1146^{e}.

== Description ==
The codex contains the text of the four Gospels, on 300 parchment leaves (size 29 cm by 21.5 cm). The text is written in one column per page, 42 lines per page. The biblical text is surrounded by a catena, of the authorship of Theophylact.

It contains tables of the κεφαλαια, numbers of the κεφαλαια (chapters) at the margin, the τιτλοι (titles) at the top, the Ammonian Sections, without references to the Eusebian Canons, subscriptions at the end of each Gospel, and numbers of stichoi.

== Text ==
The Greek text of the codex is a representative of the Byzantine text-type. Kurt Aland placed it in Category V.

It was not examined by using the Claremont Profile Method.

== History ==
Currently the manuscript is dated by the INTF to the 13th century.

According to the colophon the manuscript was written by monk Gregorius in 1228. It once belonged to Giulio Giustiniani in Venice. It was examined by Bernard de Montfaucon (Diarium Italicum, p. 433-437).

It was previously in the private collation of the Earl of Leicester at Holkham Hall, before it was purchased by the Bodleian Library in 1956.

It was added to the list of New Testament manuscript by Scrivener (1146) and Gregory (684).

The manuscript is now housed at the Bodleian Library (Holkham Gr. 64) in Oxford.

== See also ==
- List of New Testament minuscules
- Biblical manuscript
- Textual criticism
