= Uncial 0265 =

- New Testament manuscript
- Text: Luke 7:20-21,34-35
- Date: 6th century
- Script: Greek
- Now at: Berlin State Museums
- Size: 27 x 22 cm
- Type: Byzantine text-type ?
- Category: V ?

Uncial 0265 (in the Gregory-Aland numbering), is a Greek uncial manuscript of the New Testament. Palaeographically it has been assigned to the 6th century.

== Description ==
The codex contains small parts of the Gospel of Luke 7:20-21,34-35, on one parchment leaf (27 cm by 22 cm). It is survived in a fragmentary condition. Probably it was written in two columns per page, 25 lines per page, in uncial letters.

Currently it is dated by the INTF to the 6th century.

== Location ==
Currently the codex is housed at the Berlin State Museums (P. 16994) in Berlin.

== Text ==
The Greek text of this codex is a representative of the Byzantine text-type, though text is too brief for certainty. Aland with some hesitation placed it in Category V.

== See also ==
- List of New Testament uncials
- Textual criticism
