= Minuscule 136 =

- New Testament manuscript
- Text: Matthew, Mark
- Date: 13th century
- Script: Greek
- Now at: Vatican Library
- Size: 24.7 cm by 17 cm
- Type: Byzantine text-type
- Category: V

Minuscule 136 (in the Gregory-Aland numbering), Z^{ε 31} (Soden), is a Greek minuscule manuscript of the New Testament, on cotton paper leaves. Palaeographically it has been assigned to the 13th century.

== Description ==
The codex contains the text of the Gospel of Matthew and Gospel of Mark on 235 cotton paper leaves (size 24.7 cm by 17 cm), with a commentary of Euthymius Zigabenus. It has a lacuna at the end (Mark 15:1-fin).

It contains lacuna at the end of the Gospel of Mark 15:1-16:20. The text is written in one column per page, 32 lines per page.

== Text ==
The Greek text of the codex is a representative of the Byzantine text-type. Aland placed it in Category V.

== History ==
It is dated by the INTF to the 13th century. The manuscript was examined by Birch (about 1782) in Gospel of Matthew about 1782. C. R. Gregory saw the manuscript in 1886.

It is currently housed at the Vatican Library (Vat. gr. 665), at Rome.

== See also ==
- List of New Testament minuscules
- Biblical manuscript
- Textual criticism
