= Minuscule 587 =

- New Testament manuscript
- Text: Gospels
- Date: 12th century
- Script: Greek
- Now at: Biblioteca Ambrosiana
- Size: 22.3 cm by 18.9 cm
- Type: Byzantine text-type
- Category: V
- Hand: beautifully written

Minuscule 587 (in the Gregory-Aland numbering), ε 229 (von Soden), is a Greek minuscule manuscript of the New Testament, on parchment. Palaeographically it has been assigned to the 12th century. The manuscript has complex contents. It was labeled by Scrivener as 456.

== Description ==
The codex contains a complete text of the four Gospels on 183 parchment leaves (size 22.3 cm by 18.9 cm) with only one lacuna (Matthew 1:1-20). The text is written in one column per page, 25-27 lines per page, initial letters in silver. It is beautifully written.

It contains prolegomena, lists of the κεφαλαια, numerals of the κεφαλαια at the margin, (not τιτλοι), the Ammonian Sections (in Mark 240 Sections - the last in 16:19), (not references to the Eusebian Canons), and pictures (almost obliterated).

The last leaf of the codex, contains text of John 21:8-25, was supplemented in the 15th century.

== Text ==
The Greek text of the codex is a representative of the Byzantine text-type. Hermann von Soden classified it as a member of the textual family K^{x}. Aland placed it in Category V. According to the Wisse's Profile Method it represents the textual family K^{x} in Luke 1 and Luke 20. In Luke 10 no profile was made.

== History ==
The manuscript was added to the List of New Testament manuscripts by F. H. A. Scrivener.

The manuscript currently is housed at the Biblioteca Ambrosiana (M. 48 sup.), at Milan.

== See also ==
- List of New Testament minuscules
- Biblical manuscript
- Textual criticism
