= Minuscule 426 =

- New Testament manuscript
- Name: Monacensis 473
- Text: Gospel of Luke 6:17-11:28
- Date: 14th century
- Script: Greek
- Now at: Bavarian State Library
- Size: 25 cm by 17 cm
- Type: Byzantine text-type
- Category: V
- Note: no marginalia

Minuscule 426 (in the Gregory-Aland numbering), Ν^{λ49} (in the Soden numbering), is a Greek minuscule manuscript of the New Testament, on cotton paper. Palaeographically it has been assigned to the 14th century.

== Description ==
The codex contains only the text of the Gospel of Luke 6:17-11:28 on 208 paper leaves (25 cm by 17 cm). It is written in one column per page, in 26 lines per page. It contains the table of the κεφαλαια (tables of contents) at the beginning. The biblical text is surrounded by Nicetas' catena.

== Text ==
The Greek text of the codex is a representative of the Byzantine text-type. Aland placed it in Category V. It was not examined by the Claremont Profile Method.

== History ==
The manuscript was added to the list of New Testament manuscripts by Scholz (1794–1852). C. R. Gregory saw it in 1887.

Formerly the manuscript was held in Augsburg. It is currently housed at the Bavarian State Library (Gr. 473) in Munich.

== See also ==
- List of New Testament minuscules
- Biblical manuscript
- Textual criticism
- Minuscule 427
