= Minuscule 921 =

- New Testament manuscript
- Text: Book of Acts, Pauline epistles
- Date: 14th century
- Script: Greek
- Now at: Escurial
- Size: 16.1 cm by 11.8 cm
- Type: Byzantine text-type
- Category: V

Minuscule 921 (in the Gregory-Aland numbering), α 553 (von Soden), is a 14th-century Greek minuscule manuscript of the New Testament on parchment. The manuscript has survived in complete condition.

== Description ==
The codex contains the text of the Book of Acts and Pauline epistles, on 334 paper leaves (size 16.1 cm by 11.8 cm).

The text is written in one column per page, and 20 lines per page.

== Text ==
Kurt Aland placed the Greek text of the codex in Category V. It means it is a representative of the Byzantine text-type.

== History ==
According to C. R. Gregory the manuscript was written in the 15th century. Currently the manuscript is dated by the INTF to the 14th century.

It was described by Montana, who sent a description to Kelly.

The manuscript was added to the list of New Testament manuscripts by Scrivener (209^{a}, 475^{r}) and Gregory (237^{a}, 475^{r}). In 1908 Gregory gave the number 921 to it.

Formerly it was classified as lectionary under the siglum l 595.

It is currently housed in the Biblioteca de El Escorial (C. IV. 9) in Escurial.

== See also ==
- List of New Testament minuscules
- Biblical manuscript
- Textual criticism
