= Minuscule 280 =

- New Testament manuscript
- Text: Gospels
- Date: 12th century
- Script: Greek
- Now at: Bibliothèque nationale de France
- Size: 18.8 cm by 14.1 cm
- Type: Byzantine text-type
- Category: V
- Note: marginalia

Minuscule 280 is a Greek minuscule manuscript of the New Testament, made of parchment. It is designated by the siglum 280 in the Gregory-Aland numbering of New Testament manuscripts, and ε 294 in the von Soden numbering of New Testament manuscripts. Using the study of comparative writing styles (palaeography), it has been assigned to the 12th century. It has marginal notes.

== Description ==
The manuscript is a codex (precursor to the modern book format), containing the text of the four Gospels on 170 parchment leaves (sized 18.8 cm by 14.1 cm), but is missing Mark 8:3-15:36 due to the loss of several pages. The text is written in one column per page, in 25-26 lines per page.

The text is divided according to the chapters (known as κεφαλαια / kephalaia), whose numbers are given in the margin, and their titles (known as τιτλοι / titloi) written at the top of the pages. There is also a division according to the Ammonian Sections (358 in Matthew, 237 in Mark, 342 in Luke, and 226 in John), with references to the Eusebian Canons. It contains tables of contents (also known as κεφαλαια) before each Gospel, a synaxaria, and subscriptions at the end of each Gospel, with numbers of lines (known as στιχοι / stichoi) in Matthew.

== Text ==
The Greek text of the codex is considered to be a representative of the Byzantine text-type. Biblical scholar Kurt Aland placed it in Category V of his New Testament manuscript classification system. Category V manuscripts are described as "manuscripts with a purely or predominantly Byzantine text." According to the Claremont Profile Method (a specific analysis of textual data), it represents the textual family Π^{a} in Luke 1, Luke 10, and Luke 20, as a core member.

== History ==
The earliest history of the manuscript is unknown. It was added to the list of New Testament manuscripts by textual critic Johann M. A. Scholz (1794–1852). It was examined and described by scholar Paulin Martin. Biblical scholar Caspar René Gregory saw the manuscript in 1885.

The manuscript is currently dated by the INTF to the 12th century. It is presently located at the National Library of France (shelf number Gr. 87) in Paris.

== See also ==
- List of New Testament minuscules
- Biblical manuscript
- Textual criticism
