= Minuscule 286 =

- New Testament manuscript
- Text: Gospels
- Date: 1432
- Script: Greek
- Now at: Bibliothèque nationale de France
- Size: 21.7 cm by 14 cm
- Type: Byzantine text-type
- Category: V
- Note: marginalia

Minuscule 286 (in the Gregory-Aland numbering), ε 528 (Soden), is a Greek minuscule manuscript of the New Testament, on paper. It is dated by a colophon to the year 1432. It has marginalia.

== Description ==
The codex contains a complete text of the four Gospels on 264 paper leaves (21.7 cm by 14 cm). The text is written in one column per page, in 21 lines per page.

The text is divided according to the κεφαλαια (chapters), whose numbers are given at the margin, and the τιτλοι (titles of chapters) at the top of the pages. There is also a division according to the smaller Ammonian Sections (in Mark 232 Sections, the last in 16:6), with references to the Eusebian Canons (written below Ammonian Section numbers).

It contains the Epistula ad Carpianum, tables of the κεφαλαια (tables of contents) before each Gospel.

It contains the Paschal Canon for the years 1432–1502.

== Text ==
The Greek text of the codex is a representative of the Byzantine text-type. Hermann von Soden did not assign it to any of the textual families. Aland placed it in Category V. According to the Claremont Profile Method it represents text of K^{x}.

== History ==
The manuscript was written by monk Calistus, with the Paschal canon for the years 1432–1502. The manuscript was added to the list of New Testament manuscripts by Scholz (1794–1852).

It was examined and described by Paulin Martin. C. R. Gregory saw the manuscript in 1885.

The manuscript is currently housed at the Bibliothèque nationale de France (Gr. 96) at Paris.

== See also ==
- List of New Testament minuscules
- Biblical manuscript
- Textual criticism
