= Minuscule 227 =

- New Testament manuscript
- Name: Codex Escurialensis
- Text: Gospels
- Date: 13th century
- Script: Greek
- Now at: Escurial
- Size: 24 cm by 19.3 cm
- Type: Byzantine
- Category: V

Minuscule 227 (in the Gregory-Aland numbering), ε 382 (Soden), is a Greek minuscule manuscript of the New Testament, on parchment. Paleographically it has been assigned to the 13th century. It has marginalia.

== Description ==
The codex contains a complete text of the four Gospels, on 158 parchment leaves (size 24 cm by 19.3 cm). The leaves are arranged in quarto (four leaves in quire). The text is written in one column per page, 27 lines per page. Some leaves were dislocated by binder.

The text is divided according to the Ammonian Sections, whose numbers are given at the margin, but references to the Eusebian Canons are absent.

It contains Prolegomena to the four Gospels, tables of the κεφαλαια (tables of contents) before each Gospel, pictures. Many corrections were made by a later hand, which dates 1308. It contains portraits of the four Evangelists.

== Text ==
The Greek text of the codex is a representative of the Byzantine text-type. Hermann von Soden classified it to the K^{1}. Aland placed it in Category V.

According to the Claremont Profile Method it represents textual family Kx in Luke 1 and Luke 20. In Luke 10 no profile was made. It belongs to the textual cluster Ω.

== History ==
A later hand, which dates from 1308, has been making corrections.

The manuscript belonged to Pedro Hurtado de Mendoza (1578–1651), along with minuscule 819.

It was described by Daniel Gotthilf Moldenhawer, who collated it about 1783 for Birch (Esc. 5). It was shortly described by Emmanuel Miller in 1848.

It is currently housed at the Escurial (Cod. Escurialensis, X. III. 15).

== See also ==
- List of New Testament minuscules
- Biblical manuscript
- Textual criticism
