= Minuscule 146 =

Greek minuscule manuscript of the New Testament

- New Testament manuscript
- Name: Palatino-Vaticanus
- Text: Matthew, Mark
- Date: 12th century
- Script: Greek
- Now at: Vatican Library
- Size: 31 cm by 23 cm
- Type: Byzantine text-type
- Category: V
- Note: marginalia

Minuscule 146 (in the Gregory-Aland numbering), A^{203} (Soden), is a Greek minuscule manuscript of the New Testament, on parchment leaves. Palaeographically it has been assigned to the 12th century. It has marginalia.

== Description ==
The codex contains the text of the Gospel of Matthew and Gospel of Mark on 265 thick parchment leaves (size 31 cm by 23 cm), with a commentary. The text is written in brow ink in one column per page, biblical text in 13 lines per page (11.2 by 9.6 cm), commentary text in 34 lines (21 by 18.2 cm). The ink is brown.

The text is divided according to the Ammonian Sections, whose numbers are given at the margin, with references to the Eusebian Canons (written below Ammonian Section numbers).

It contains the table of the κεφαλαια (table of contents) to Mark, and a commentaries (Victor's in Mark).

== Text ==
The Greek text of the codex is a representative of the Byzantine text-type. Aland placed it in Category V.

== History ==
F. H. A. Scrivener and C. R. Gregory dated the manuscript to the 12th century. Currently it is dated by the INTF to the 12th century.

The manuscript was examined and described by Birch (about 1782) and Scholz. Gregory saw the manuscript in 1886.

It is currently housed at the Vatican Library (Pal. gr. 5), at Rome.

== See also ==
- List of New Testament minuscules
- Biblical manuscript
- Textual criticism
