= Uncial 0134 =

- New Testament manuscript
- Text: Mark 3; 5 †
- Date: 8th-century
- Script: Greek
- Now at: Bodleian Library
- Size: 17 x 14 cm
- Type: Byzantine text-type
- Category: V

Uncial 0134 (in the Gregory-Aland numbering), ε 84 (Soden), is a Greek uncial manuscript of the New Testament, dated paleographically to the 8th-century. Formerly it was labelled by W^{h}.

== Description ==
The codex contains a small part of the Mark 3:15-32; 5:16-31, on two parchment leaves (17 cm by 14 cm). Parchment is fine. The text is written in one column per page, 26 lines per page, in 21-24 letters in line. The letters are small. It has breathings and accents. It contains numbers of the κεφαλαια (chapters), the Ammonian Sections, and a references to the Eusebian Canons.

The Greek text of this codex is a representative of the Byzantine text-type. Aland placed it in Category V.

Currently it is dated by the INTF to the 8th-century.

The codex is located now at the Bodleian Library (Sedl. sup. 2, ff. 177–178) in Oxford.

== See also ==
- List of New Testament uncials
- Textual criticism
