= Minuscule 920 =

- New Testament manuscript
- Text: Book of Acts, Pauline epistles, Book of Revelation
- Date: 10th century
- Script: Greek
- Now at: Escurial
- Size: 22.9 cm by 17 cm
- Type: Byzantine text-type
- Category: V

Minuscule 920 (in the Gregory-Aland numbering), α 55 (von Soden), is a 10th-century Greek minuscule manuscript of the New Testament on parchment. The manuscript has not survived in complete condition.

== Description ==
The codex contains the text of the Book of Acts, Catholic epistles, Pauline epistles, and Book of Revelation, on 239 parchment leaves (size 22.9 cm by 17 cm). The texts of Acts 1:1-7:35; 7:53-8:12; 11:20-12:14; 15:11-18; Apocalypse 22:1-fin.

The text is written in one column per page, with 25 lines per page.

It contains scholia at the margin.

== Text ==
Kurt Aland placed the Greek text of the codex in Category V. This means it is a representative of the Byzantine text-type.

== History ==
According to C. R. Gregory the manuscript was written in the 10th century. Currently the manuscript is dated by the INTF to the 10th century.

It was described by Montana, who sent description to Kelly.

The manuscript was added to the list of New Testament manuscripts by Scrivener (208^{a}) and Gregory (236^{a}, 126^{r}). In 1908 Gregory gave the number 920 to it.

It is currently housed in the Biblioteca de El Escorial (Ψ. III. 18) in Escurial.

== See also ==
- List of New Testament minuscules
- Biblical manuscript
- Textual criticism
