= Minuscule 596 =

- New Testament manuscript
- Text: Gospel of Matthew-Gospel of Mark †
- Date: 11th century
- Script: Greek
- Now at: Biblioteca Marciana
- Size: 29.5 cm by 21 cm
- Type: Byzantine text-type
- Category: V
- Note: marginalia

Minuscule 596 (in the Gregory-Aland numbering), Θ^{ε 12} (von Soden), is a Greek minuscule manuscript of the New Testament, on parchment. Palaeographically it has been assigned to the 11th century. The manuscript is lacunose. It was labelled by Scrivener as 465. It has marginalia.

== Description ==
The codex contains the text of the Gospel of Matthew-Gospel of Mark on 228 parchment leaves (size 29.5 cm by 21 cm) with lacunae. The codex ends in Mark 12:17. The text is written in one column per page, 29 lines per page.

It contains the lists of the κεφαλαια, numerals of the κεφαλαια (chapters) at the left margin, the τιτλοι (titles) at the top. It contains a Theophylact's commentary.

== Text ==
The Greek text of the codex is a representative of the Byzantine text-type. Aland placed it in Category V.

== History ==
Formerly it was held in "Archivo" in Venice. The manuscript was added to the list of New Testament manuscripts by F. H. A. Scrivener. It was examined by Dean Burgon. Gregory saw it in 1886.

The manuscript currently is housed at the Biblioteca Marciana (Gr. I,57 (995)), at Venice.

== See also ==
- List of New Testament minuscules
- Biblical manuscript
- Textual criticism
