= Uncial 0253 =

- New Testament manuscript
- Text: Luke 10:19-22
- Date: 6th century
- Script: Greek
- Now at: Qubbat al-Khazna
- Size: 31 x 25 cm
- Type: Byzantine text-type
- Category: V

Uncial 0253 (in the Gregory-Aland numbering), is a Greek uncial manuscript of the New Testament. Palaeographically it has been assigned to the 6th century.

== Description ==
The codex contains two small parts of the Gospel of Luke 10:19-22, on one parchment leaf (31 cm by 25 cm). The text is written in one column per page, 14 lines per page, in uncial letters.

Currently it is dated by the INTF to the 6th century.

== Location ==
Formerly the codex was held at the Qubbat al-Khazna in Damascus. The present location of the codex is unknown. Currently the manuscript is not accessible.

== Text ==
The Greek text of this codex is a representative of the Byzantine text-type. Aland placed it in Category V.

== See also ==
- List of New Testament uncials
- Textual criticism
