= Minuscule 727 =

- New Testament manuscript
- Text: Gospels
- Date: 14th century
- Script: Greek
- Now at: Bibliothèque nationale de France
- Size: 34.4 cm by 25 cm
- Type: Byzantine text-type
- Category: V
- Note: –

Minuscule 727 (in the Gregory-Aland numbering), Θ^{ε411} (von Soden), is a Greek minuscule manuscript of the New Testament written on parchment. Palaeographically it has been assigned to the 14th century. The manuscript is lacunose. Scrivener labelled it as 745^{e}.

== Description ==
The codex contains the text of the four Gospels on 246 parchment leaves (size 34.4 cm by 25 cm), with some lacunae. It lacks texts of Matthew 16:4-17:6.

The text is written in two columns per page, 50 lines per page.

The text is divided according to the κεφαλαια (chapters), with their τιτλοι (titles of chapters) at the top. There is no a division according to the smaller Ammonian Sections, no references to the Eusebian Canons.

It contains double Prolegomena, lists of the κεφαλαια (tables of contents), and a commentary of Theophylact.

== Text ==
The Greek text of the codex is a representative of the Byzantine text-type. Aland placed it in Category V.

It was not examined by using the Claremont Profile Method.

== History ==
Scrivener dated the manuscript to the 16th century, Gregory dated it to the 14th century. The manuscript is currently dated by the INTF to the 14th century.

The manuscript was added to the list of New Testament manuscripts by Scrivener (745) and Gregory (727). It was examined and described by Paulin Martin. Gregory saw the manuscript in 1885.

The manuscript is now housed at the Bibliothèque nationale de France (Gr. 179) in Paris.

== See also ==
- Biblical manuscript – Handwritten copy of a portion of the Bible
- List of New Testament minuscules – Greek New Testament manuscripts
- Textual criticism – Identification of textual variants
