= Uncial 0257 =

- New Testament manuscript
- Text: Matthew 5-26; Mark 6-16
- Date: 9th century
- Script: Greek
- Now at: Zavorda
- Size: 29.5 x 22 cm
- Type: Byzantine text-type
- Category: V

Uncial 0257 (in the Gregory-Aland numbering), is a Greek uncial manuscript of the New Testament. Paleographically it has been assigned to the 9th century.

== Description ==
The codex contains some parts of the Matthew 5-26; Mark 6-16, on 47 parchment leaves (29.5 cm by 22 cm). It is written in two columns per page, 23 lines per page, in uncial letters. It is a palimpsest, the upper text contains a lectionary 2094.

Currently it is dated by the Institute for New Testament Textual Research to the 9th century.

== Contents ==
Matt 5:17-29; 8:4-19; 12:4-13:41; 13:55-14:15; 25:28-16:19; 21:20-43; 22:13-24:24; 25:6-36; 26:24-39;
Mark 6:22-36; 7:15-37; 8:33-11:22; 14:21-16:12.

== Text ==
The Greek text of this codex is a representative of the Byzantine text-type. Aland placed it in Category V.

== Location ==
Currently the codex is housed at the Monastery of Agiou Nikanoros (2, ff. 1-16, 289-319) in Zavorda.

== See also ==
- List of New Testament uncials
- Textual criticism
