= Uncial 0197 =

- New Testament manuscript
- Text: Matthew 20:22-23,25-27; 22:30-32,34-37
- Date: 9th-century
- Script: Greek
- Now at: Beuron Archabbey
- Size: 27 x 24.5 cm
- Type: Byzantine text-type
- Category: V

Uncial 0197 (in the Gregory-Aland numbering), is a Greek uncial manuscript of the New Testament, dated paleographically to the 9th-century.

== Description ==
The codex contains a small parts of the Matthew 20:22-23,25-27; 22:30-32,34-37, on two parchment leaves (27 cm by 24.5 cm). It is written in one column per page, 12 lines per page, in very large uncial letters. It is a palimpsest, the lower text is in Syriac.

The Greek text of this codex is a representative of the Byzantine text-type. Aland placed it in Category V.

Currently it is dated by the INTF to the 9th-century.

The codex currently is housed at the Benedictine Abbey in Beuron.

== See also ==
- List of New Testament uncials
- Textual criticism
