= Minuscule 342 =

- New Testament manuscript
- Text: Gospels
- Date: 13th-century
- Script: Greek
- Now at: Turin National University Library
- Size: 20.3 cm by 15.5 cm
- Type: Byzantine text-type
- Category: V
- Note: marginalia

Minuscule 342 (in the Gregory-Aland numbering), ε 314 (Soden), is a Greek minuscule manuscript of the New Testament, on parchment. Palaeographically it has been assigned to the 13th century. It has marginalia.

== Description ==
The codex contains a complete text of the four Gospels on 300 parchment leaves (20.3 cm by 15.5 cm). It is written in one column per page, in 21 lines per page.

The text is divided according to the κεφαλαια (chapters), whose numbers are given at the margin, and their τιτλοι (titles of chapters) at the top of the pages. There is also a division according to the smaller Ammonian Sections (in Mark 234 Sections – the last in 16:9), with references to the Eusebian Canons.

It contains the Epistula ad Carpianum, the Eusebian Canon tables at the beginning, tables of the κεφαλαια (tables of contents) before each Gospel, and portraits of Evangelists before each Gospel.

== Text ==
The Greek text of the codex is a representative of the Byzantine text-type. Aland placed it in Category V. It was not examined by the Claremont Profile Method.

== History ==
The manuscript was examined by Passino, Scholz, and Burgon. It was added to the list of New Testament manuscripts by Scholz (1794-1852). C. R. Gregory saw it in 1886.

The manuscript is currently housed at the Turin National University Library (B. V. 24) in Turin.

== See also ==
- List of New Testament minuscules
- Biblical manuscript
- Textual criticism
