= Minuscule 100 =

- New Testament manuscript
- Name: Codex Pestinensis
- Text: Gospels
- Date: 10th century
- Script: Greek
- Now at: Eötvös Loránd University
- Size: 23.5 cm by 18 cm
- Type: Byzantine text-type
- Category: V
- Note: full marginalia

Minuscule 100 is a Greek minuscule manuscript of the New Testament Gospels, written on parchment. It is designated by the siglum 100 in the Gregory-Aland numbering of New Testament manuscripts, and as A^{11} in the von Soden numbering of New Testament manuscripts. Using the study of comparative writing styles (palaeography), it has been assigned to the 10th century. The manuscript has complex contents and full marginal notes.

== Description ==
The manuscript is a codex (precursor to the modern book format), containing the complete text of the four Gospels written on 374 parchment leaves (sized 23.5 cm by 18 cm), with a commentary surrounding the main gospel text. The text is written in one column per page, 39-45 lines per page.

The text is divided according to the chapters (known as κεφαλαια / kephalaia), whose numbers are given in the margin, and their titles (known as τιτλοι titloi) written at the top of the pages. There is also a division according to the smaller Ammonian Sections, with references to the Eusebian Canons (both early divisions of the Gospels into sections).

It contains the Eusebian Canon tables at the beginning of each Gospel, the tables of contents (also known as κεφαλαια) before each Gospel, lectionary markings in the margin (for liturgical use), pictures, and many corrections with marginal notes added by a later hand. The Synaxarion, Menologion, and the lessons (known as αναγνωσεις / anagnoseis) were added by a later hand. The text of the Gospels is surrounded by a catena.

== Text ==
The Greek text of the codex is considered to be a representative of the Byzantine text-type. Biblical scholar Kurt Aland placed it in Category V of his New testament manuscript classification system. Category V manuscripts are described as "manuscripts with a purely or predominantly Byzantine text." It was not examined by using the Claremont Profile Method (a specific analysis of textual data). The text of John 21:25 is omitted.

== History ==
The earliest history of the manuscript is unknown. It once belonged to Paul de Eibiswald. Biblical scholar Wagenseil used it in Hungary for the text of John 8:6.

During the 15th century it belonged to John Pannonius, Bishop of Pécs. It was examined by textual critic Johann J. Wettstein (though the info here may be wrong, and another manuscript was intended).

It was edited in 1860 in Pesht by Samuel Markfi. It is currently housed in the Eötvös Loránd University (shelf number Cod. Gr. 1), at Budapest in Hungary.

== See also ==
- List of New Testament minuscules
- Biblical manuscript
- Textual criticism
