= Minuscule 708 =

- New Testament manuscript
- Text: Gospels †
- Date: 11th century
- Script: Greek
- Now at: Bodleian Library
- Size: 19 cm by 15 cm
- Type: Byzantine text-type
- Category: V
- Note: family K^{x}

Minuscule 708 (in the Gregory-Aland numbering), ε153 (von Soden), is a Greek minuscule manuscript of the New Testament, on parchment. Palaeographically it has been assigned to the 11th century. The manuscript is lacunose. Scrivener labelled it as 607^{e}.

== Description ==
The codex contains the text of the four Gospels on 200 parchment leaves (size 19 cm by 15 cm), with one lacuna in text (Matthew 20:15-24:22).

The text is written in one column per page, 30 lines per page. It has ornamental headpieces.

It contains the Eusebian Canon tables at the beginning, the lists of the κεφαλαια are placed before each Gospel.

The text is divided according to the κεφαλαια (chapters), which numbers are given the left margin, and their τιτλοι (titles) at the top; there is also a division according to the smaller Ammonian Sections, with a references to the Eusebian Canons. It contains portraits of the Evangelists (Mark as eagle, John as lion).

== Text ==
The Greek text of the codex is a representative of the Byzantine text-type. Kurt Aland placed it in Category V.

According to the Claremont Profile Method it represents mixed Byzantine text in Luke 1 and textual family K^{x} in Luke 20. In Luke 10 no profile was made.

== History ==
Scrivener and Gregory dated the manuscript to the 11th century. Currently the manuscript is dated by the INTF to the 11th century.

The manuscript was held n Constantinople, where was bought in 1882.

It was added to the list of New Testament manuscripts by Scrivener (607) and Gregory (708). Gregory saw the manuscript in 1883.

At present the manuscript is housed at the Bodleian Library (MS. Auct. T. inf. 1. 3) in Oxford.

== See also ==
- List of New Testament minuscules
- Biblical manuscript
- Textual criticism
