= Minuscule 138 =

- New Testament manuscript
- Name: Codex Vaticanus 757
- Text: Gospels†
- Date: 11th century
- Script: Greek
- Now at: Vatican Library
- Size: 30 cm by 22.5 cm
- Type: Byzantine text-type
- Category: V
- Hand: slovenly hand

Minuscule 138 (in the Gregory-Aland numbering), A^{304} (Soden), is a Greek minuscule manuscript of the New Testament, on parchment leaves. Palaeographically it has been assigned to the 11th century. The manuscript is lacunose.

== Description ==
The codex contains the text of the four Gospels on 380 parchment leaves (size 30 cm by 22.5 cm), with a commentary, and minor lacunae. The text is written in one column per page, 37 lines per page.

The commentary on Mark is of Victor, mixed up with the text, both in slovenly hand.

It contains synaxaria, Menologion, and pictures. The tables of the κεφαλαια (tables of contents) were added by a later hand before each Gospel. At the end of each Gospel were added subscriptions with numbers of verses. Mark 16:9-20 was marked by an obelus as doubtful.

The text of Matthew 1:1-4:11 was supplied by a later hand.

== Text ==
The Greek text of the codex is a representative of the Byzantine text-type. Aland placed it in Category V. According to the Claremont Profile Method it represents the textual family K^{x} in Luke 1. In Luke 10 and Luke 20 no profile was made.

== History ==
The manuscript was examined by Birch (about 1782), Scholz, and Burgon. C. R. Gregory saw the manuscript in 1886.

It is currently housed at the Vatican Library (Vat. gr. 757), at Rome.

== See also ==
- List of New Testament minuscules
- Biblical manuscript
- Textual criticism
