= Minuscule 914 =

- New Testament manuscript
- Text: Acts, Cath, Paul †
- Date: 13th century
- Script: Greek
- Now at: Escurial
- Size: 23 cm by 16.5 cm
- Type: Byzantine text-type
- Category: V

Minuscule 914 (in the Gregory-Aland numbering), α 383 (von Soden), is a 13th-century Greek minuscule manuscript of the New Testament on parchment. The manuscript has not survived in complete condition.

== Description ==
The codex contains the text of the Book of Acts, Catholic epistles and Pauline epistles, on 344 parchment leaves (size 23 cm by 16.5 cm).

The text is written in one column per page, and 18 lines per page.

It has lacuna at the end. Some leaves of the codex were destroyed by fire.

It contains lectionary markings at the margin for liturgical reading. The manuscript is ornamented.

== Text ==
Kurt Aland the Greek text of the codex placed in Category V. It means it is a representative of the Byzantine text-type.

== History ==
According to Scrivener and C. R. Gregory the manuscript was written in the 13th century. Currently the manuscript is dated by the INTF to the 13th century.

It was described by Miller R.

The manuscript was added to the list of New Testament manuscripts by Scrivener (202^{a}) and Gregory (230^{a}). In 1908 Gregory gave the number 914 to it.

It is currently housed in the Biblioteca de El Escorial (R. III. 4) in Escurial.

== See also ==
- List of New Testament minuscules
- Biblical manuscript
- Textual criticism
