= Minuscule 867 =

- New Testament manuscript
- Text: Gospels †
- Date: 14th century
- Script: Greek
- Now at: Vatican Library
- Size: 16 cm by 11 cm
- Type: Byzantine text-type
- Category: V
- Note: marginalia

Minuscule 867 (in the Gregory-Aland numbering), ε400 (von Soden), is a 14th-century Greek minuscule manuscript of the New Testament on parchment. The manuscript has no complex context, and some marginalia.

== Description ==
The codex contains the text of the four Gospels on 223 parchment leaves (size 16 cm by 11 cm), with one lacuna (Matthew 1:1-6:1). The text is written in one column per page, 20 lines per page.

The text is divided according to the κεφαλαια (chapters), whose numbers are given at the margin of the text, but without their τιτλοι (titles) at the top of the pages.

It contains Prolegomena (explanation of using of the Eusebian Canons), tables of the κεφαλαια (tables of contents) before each Gospel with a Harmony, lectionary markings at the margin (for Church reading), αναγνωσεις (lessons), subscriptions at the end of each Gospel, with numbers of stichoi, and numbers of Verses.

== Text ==
The Greek text of the codex is a representative of the Byzantine text-type. Hermann von Soden classified it to the textual family K^{r}. Kurt Aland the Greek text of the codex placed in Category V. According to the Claremont Profile Method it represents textual family K^{r} in Luke 1 and Luke 20, as a perfect member of the family. In Luke 10 no profile was made.

The text of the Pericope Adulterae (John 7:53-8:11) is marked by an obelus.

== History ==
F. H. A. Scrivener dated the manuscript to the 15th or 14th century, C. R. Gregory dated it to the 14th century. Currently the manuscript is dated by the INTF to the 14th century.

The manuscript was added to the list of New Testament manuscripts by Scrivener (680^{e}) and Gregory (867^{e}). Gregory saw it in 1886.

Currently the manuscript is housed at the Vatican Library (Gr. 1895), in Rome.

== See also ==
- List of New Testament minuscules
- Biblical manuscript
- Textual criticism
- Minuscule 866
- Minuscule 868
