= Minuscule 819 =

- New Testament manuscript
- Text: Gospel of Matthew, Gospel of John
- Date: 14th century
- Script: Greek
- Now at: El Escorial
- Size: 23.7 cm by 20.5 cm
- Type: Byzantine text-type
- Category: V
- Note: –

Minuscule 819 (in the Gregory-Aland numbering), Θ^{ε420} (von Soden), is a 14th-century Greek minuscule manuscript of the New Testament written on paper, with a commentary.

== Description ==
The codex contains the text of the Gospel of Matthew and Gospel of John, on 361 paper leaves (size 23.7 cm by 20.5 cm), with a commentary. The leaves were arranged in quarto (four leaves in quire). The first leaf was supplied by later hand.

The text is written in one column per page, 24 lines per page.

It contains a commentary of Theophylact.

== Text ==
The Greek text of the codex is a representative of the Byzantine text-type. Aland placed it in Category V.

== History ==
Gregory dated the manuscript to the 14th century. It is presently assigned to the 14th century on palaeographic grounds by the Institute for New Testament Textual Research.

The manuscript belonged to Pedro Hurtado de Mendoza (1578–1651), along with Minuscule 227. It was briefly described by Emmanuel Miller in 1848.

It was added to the list of New Testament manuscripts by Gregory (819^{e}).

The manuscript is now housed in El Escorial (Ψ. III, 14).

== See also ==
- List of New Testament minuscules
- Biblical manuscript
- Textual criticism
- Minuscule 226
