= Minuscule 366 =

- New Testament manuscript
- Text: Gospel of Matthew †
- Date: 14th century
- Script: Greek
- Now at: Laurentian Library
- Size: 29 cm by 22.5 cm
- Type: Byzantine
- Category: V
- Note: marginalia

Minuscule 366 (in the Gregory-Aland numbering), C^{μ24} (Soden), is a Greek minuscule manuscript of the New Testament, on parchment. Paleographically it has been assigned to the 14th century. It has marginalia.

== Description ==
The codex contains the text of the Gospel of Matthew on 323 parchment leaves (29 cm by 22.5 cm) with lacunae (Matthew 1:1-2:16). It is written in one column per page, in 31 lines per page. The biblical text is written in red. It is surrounded by a catena.

The text is divided according to the κεφαλαια (chapters), whose numbers are given at the margin, and their τιτλοι (titles of chapters) at the top of the pages (with a Harmony).

It contains αναγνωσεις (lessons) and many marginal notes added by a later hands.

== Text ==
The Greek text of the codex is a representative of the Byzantine text-type. Aland placed it in Category V.

== History ==
The manuscript was added to the list of New Testament manuscripts by Scholz (1794–1852). It was examined by Burgon and C. R. Gregory (1886).

The manuscript is currently housed at the Biblioteca Laurentiana (Conv. Soppr. 171) in Florence.

== See also ==
- List of New Testament minuscules
- Biblical manuscript
- Textual criticism
