= Minuscule 186 =

- New Testament manuscript
- Text: Gospels
- Date: 11th century
- Script: Greek
- Now at: Laurentian Library
- Size: 28.3 cm by 21.7 cm
- Type: Byzantine text-type
- Category: V
- Note: marginalia

Minuscule 186 (in the Gregory-Aland numbering), A^{129} (Soden), is a Greek minuscule manuscript of the New Testament, on parchment. Paleographically it has been assigned to the 11th century. It has marginalia.

== Description ==
The codex contains the text of the four Gospels on 36 thick parchment leaves (size 28.3 cm by 21.7 cm). The text is written in one column per page, biblical text in 20 lines per page (size of text 11.6 by 8.5 cm), text of commentary in 48 lines per page (size of commentary 21.9 by 15.8 cm), in brown ink, the capital letters in red.

The text is divided according to the κεφαλαια (chapters), whose numbers are given at the margin, and their τιτλοι (titles of chapters) at the top of the pages. There is also another division, according to the smaller Ammonian Sections (in Mark 233 Sections), with references to the Eusebian Canons (written below Ammonian Section numbers).

It contains the Epistula ad Carpianum, Eusebian Canon tables, Prolegomena, tables of the κεφαλαια (tables of contents) before each Gospel, synaxaria, Menologion, and pictures. The commentary is of Victor's authorship in Mark.

== Text ==
The Greek text of the codex is a representative of the Byzantine text-type. Aland placed it in Category V.

It was not examined by using the Claremont Profile Method.

== History ==
The manuscript was written by Leontius, a calligrapher (see minuscule 208).

It was examined by Bandini, Birch, Scholz, and Burgon. C. R. Gregory saw the manuscript in 1886.

It is currently housed at the Laurentian Library (Plutei. VI. 18), at Florence.

== See also ==
- List of New Testament minuscules
- Biblical manuscript
- Textual criticism
