= Minuscule 755 =

Minuscule 7554
- New Testament manuscript
- Text: Gospels
- Date: 16th century
- Script: Greek
- Now at: Bibliothèque nationale de France
- Size: 21 cm by 14 cm
- Type: Byzantine text-type
- Category: V
- Note: —

Minuscule 755 (in the Gregory-Aland numbering), ε606 (von Soden), is a Greek minuscule manuscript of the New Testament written on paper. Palaeographically it has been assigned to the 16th century. The manuscript has complex contents. Scrivener labelled it as 771^{e}.

== Description ==
The codex contains the text of the four Gospels, on 332 paper leaves (size 21 cm by 14 cm).

The text is written in one column per page, in 20 lines per page.

It contains pictures. The manuscript is ornamented.

== Text ==
The Greek text of the codex is a representative of the Byzantine text-type. Aland placed it in Category V.

It was not examined by using the Claremont Profile Method.

== History ==
Scrivener dated the manuscript to the 14th century; Gregory dated it to the 16th century. The manuscript is currently dated by the INTF to the 16th century.

The manuscript was brought from Janina.

It was added to the list of New Testament manuscripts by Scrivener (771) and Gregory (755).

The manuscript is now housed at the Bibliothèque nationale de France (Suppl. Gr. 1080) in Paris.

== See also ==
- List of New Testament minuscules
- Biblical manuscript
- Textual criticism
- Minuscule 754
