= Minuscule 289 =

- New Testament manuscript
- Text: Gospels
- Date: 1625
- Script: Greek
- Now at: Bibliothèque nationale de France
- Size: 18 cm by 12.2 cm
- Type: Byzantine text-type
- Category: V
- Note: marginalia

Minuscule 289 (in the Gregory-Aland numbering), ε 713 (Soden), is a Greek minuscule manuscript of the New Testament, on paper. It is dated by a colophon to the year 1625. It has marginalia.

== Description ==
The codex contains the text of the four Gospels on 336 paper leaves (18 cm by 12.2 cm). The text is written in one column per page, in 19 lines per page. The text is divided according to the κεφαλαια (chapters), whose numbers are given at the margin (in Latin).

== Text ==
The Greek text of the codex is a representative of the Byzantine text-type. Aland placed it in Category V. It was not examined by the Claremont Profile Method.

== History ==
The manuscript was written by Lucas, the αρχιθυτης. The manuscript was added to the list of New Testament manuscripts by Scholz (1794-1852). It was examined and described by Paulin Martin. C. R. Gregory saw it in 1885.

The manuscript is currently housed at the Bibliothèque nationale de France (Gr. 100A) at Paris.

== See also ==
- List of New Testament minuscules
- Biblical manuscript
- Textual criticism
