= Minuscule 379 =

- New Testament manuscript
- Text: Gospels
- Date: 15th century
- Script: Greek
- Now at: Vatican Library
- Size: 29.7 cm by 20.2 cm
- Type: Byzantine text-type
- Category: V
- Note: commentary

Minuscule 379 (in the Gregory-Aland numbering), Z^{ε50} (Soden), is a Greek minuscule manuscript of the New Testament, on paper. Palaeographically it has been assigned to the 15th century. It has marginalia.

== Description ==
The codex contains the text of the four Gospels on 437 paper leaves (29.7 cm by 20.2 cm). The text is written in one column per page, in 27 lines per page. It contains a commentary.

It contains tables of the κεφαλαια (tables of contents) before each Gospel, numbers of the κεφαλαια (chapters) at the margin, and the τιτλοι (titles) at the top of the pages.

== Text ==
The Greek text of the codex is a representative of the Byzantine text-type. Aland placed it in Category V. It was not examined by using the Claremont Profile Method.

== History ==
The manuscript was added to the list of New Testament manuscripts by Scholz (1794–1852).

C. R. Gregory saw it in 1886.

The manuscript is currently housed at the Vatican Library (Vat. gr. 1769) in Rome.

== See also ==
- List of New Testament minuscules
- Biblical manuscript
- Textual criticism
