= Minuscule 894 =

- New Testament manuscript
- Name: Gr. II,144 (1362), fol. 1-4
- Text: Gospel of Mark
- Date: 11th century
- Script: Greek
- Now at: Biblioteca Marciana
- Size: 25 cm by 20.5 cm
- Type: Byzantine
- Category: V
- Note: marginalia

Minuscule 894 (in the Gregory-Aland numbering), A^{126} and C^{ι12} (von Soden), is an 11th-century Greek minuscule manuscript of the New Testament on parchment. It has marginalia. The manuscript has survived in a fragmentary condition.

== Description ==
The codex contains the text of the Gospel of Mark (14:62-15:46), on 5 parchment leaves (size 25 cm by 20.5 cm). The text is written in one column per page, 18 lines per page.

The text of the Gospels is divided according to the κεφαλαια (chapters), whose numbers are given at the margin, and their τιτλοι (titles of chapters) at the top of the pages. There is also a division according to the smaller Ammonian Sections, whose numbers are given at the margin, with references to the Eusebian Canons (written below Ammonian Section numbers).

== Text ==
The Greek text of the codex is a representative of the Byzantine. Kurt Aland placed it in Category V.

== History ==
According to C. R. Gregory it was written in the 11th century. Currently the manuscript is dated by the INTF to the 11th century.

The manuscript was added to the list of New Testament manuscripts by Gregory (894^{e}).

It is not cited in critical editions of the Greek New Testament (UBS4, NA28).

Four leaves of the manuscript is housed at the Biblioteca Marciana (II,144 (1362), fol. 1-4), in Venice. One leaf is housed in Oslo (Schøyen Collection, MS 583/2).

== See also ==
- List of New Testament minuscules (1–1000)
- Biblical manuscript
- Textual criticism
- Minuscule 893
