= Minuscule 202 =

- New Testament manuscript
- Text: Gospels
- Date: 12th century
- Script: Greek
- Now at: British Library
- Size: 25.1 cm by 20.6 cm
- Type: Byzantine text-type
- Category: V
- Note: marginalia

Minuscule 202 (in the Gregory-Aland numbering), ε 242 (Soden), is a Greek minuscule manuscript of the New Testament, on parchment. Paleographically it has been assigned to the 12th century. It has marginalia.

== Description ==
The codex contains the complete text of the four Gospels on 278 parchment leaves (size 25.1 cm by 20.6 cm). Pauline epistles followed after Catholic epistles. It is written in one column per page, in 21 lines per page, in light-brown or dark-brown ink, capital letters in gold. It is a "splendid copy".

The text is divided according to the κεφαλαια (chapters), whose numbers are given at the margin, and their τιτλοι (titles of chapters) at the top of the pages. There is also a division according to the Ammonian Sections (in Mark 234 sections - the last in 16:9), with references to the Eusebian Canons (written below Ammonian Section numbers).

It contains tables of the κεφαλαια (tables of contents) before each Gospel, in red and gold, lectionary markings at the margin, subscriptions at the end of each Gospel, numbers of στιχοι, Menologion, and synaxaria. It uses "iota adscript".

== Text ==
The Greek text of the codex is a representative of the Byzantine text-type. Hermann von Soden included it to the textual family K^{x}. Aland placed it in Category V. According to the Claremont Profile Method it represents textual family K^{x} and creates cluster 202.

The Pericope Adulterae (John 7:53-8:11) is marked by an obelus.

== History ==
Formerly the manuscript belonged to the monastery S. Marco in Florence (together with Add MSS 14770 and 14771). Later it belonged to Samuel Butler Bishop of Lichfield. It was purchased from Payne and Foss, on 16 November 1843.

It was examined by Birch and Bloomfield. C. R. Gregory saw it in 1883.

It is currently housed at the British Library (Add MS 14774) in London.

== See also ==
- List of New Testament minuscules
- Biblical manuscript
- Textual criticism
