= Minuscule 281 =

- New Testament manuscript
- Text: Gospels
- Date: 12th century
- Script: Greek
- Now at: Bibliothèque nationale de France
- Size: 21.3 cm by 15.6 cm
- Type: Byzantine text-type
- Category: V
- Note: full marginalia

Minuscule 281 (in the Gregory-Aland numbering), ε 295 (Soden), is a Greek minuscule manuscript of the New Testament, on parchment. Paleographically it has been assigned to the 12th century. It has full marginalia.

== Description ==
The codex contains the text of the four Gospels on 249 parchment leaves (21.3 cm by 15.6 cm), with lacunae (Matthew 28:11-20; Luke 1:1-9). The text is written in one column per page, in 22-23 lines per page.

The text is divided according to the κεφαλαια (chapters), whose numbers are given at the margin, with their τιτλοι (titles of chapters) at the top of the pages. There is also a division according to the Ammonian Sections (to Matthew and Luke), but without references to the Eusebian Canons (written below Ammonian Section numbers).

It contains the Eusebian tables, subscriptions to John, lectionary markings – for liturgical reading – were added by a later hand.

== Text ==
The Greek text of the codex is a representative of the Byzantine text-type. Aland placed it in Category V. According to the Claremont Profile Method it belongs to the textual family Family K^{x} in Luke 1, Luke 10, and Luke 20.

== History ==
The manuscript was presented to the monastery "Deiparae Hieracis" by the eremite monk Meletius. The manuscript was added to the list of New Testament manuscripts by Scholz (1794-1852). It was examined and described by Paulin Martin. C. R. Gregory saw the manuscript in 1885.

The manuscript is currently housed at the Bibliothèque nationale de France (Gr. 88) at Paris.

== See also ==
- List of New Testament minuscules
- Biblical manuscript
- Textual criticism
