= Minuscule 381 =

- New Testament manuscript
- Name: Palatino-Vaticanus 20
- Text: Gospel of Luke
- Date: 14th century
- Script: Greek
- Now at: Vatican Library
- Size: 31.4 cm by 25 cm
- Type: Byzantine text-type
- Category: V

Minuscule 381 (in the Gregory-Aland numbering), Α^{400} and Ν^{λ47} (Soden), is a Greek minuscule manuscript of the New Testament, on paper. Palaeographically it has been assigned to the 14th century.

== Description ==
The codex contains the text of the Gospel of Luke on 226 paper leaves (31.4 cm by 25 cm) with only one lacuna (Luke 1:1-5). It is written in one column per page, in 33 lines per page. The biblical text is surrounded by a catena.

== Text ==
The Greek text of the codex is a representative of the Byzantine text-type. Aland placed it in Category V. It was not examined by the Claremont Profile Method.

== History ==
Scrivener and Gregory dated it to the 14th century.

The manuscript was added to the list of New Testament manuscripts by Scholz (1794–1852). C. R. Gregory saw it in 1886.

The manuscript is currently housed at the Vatican Library (Pal. gr. 20) in Rome.

== See also ==
- List of New Testament minuscules
- Biblical manuscript
- Textual criticism
