= List of New Testament minuscules (401–500) =

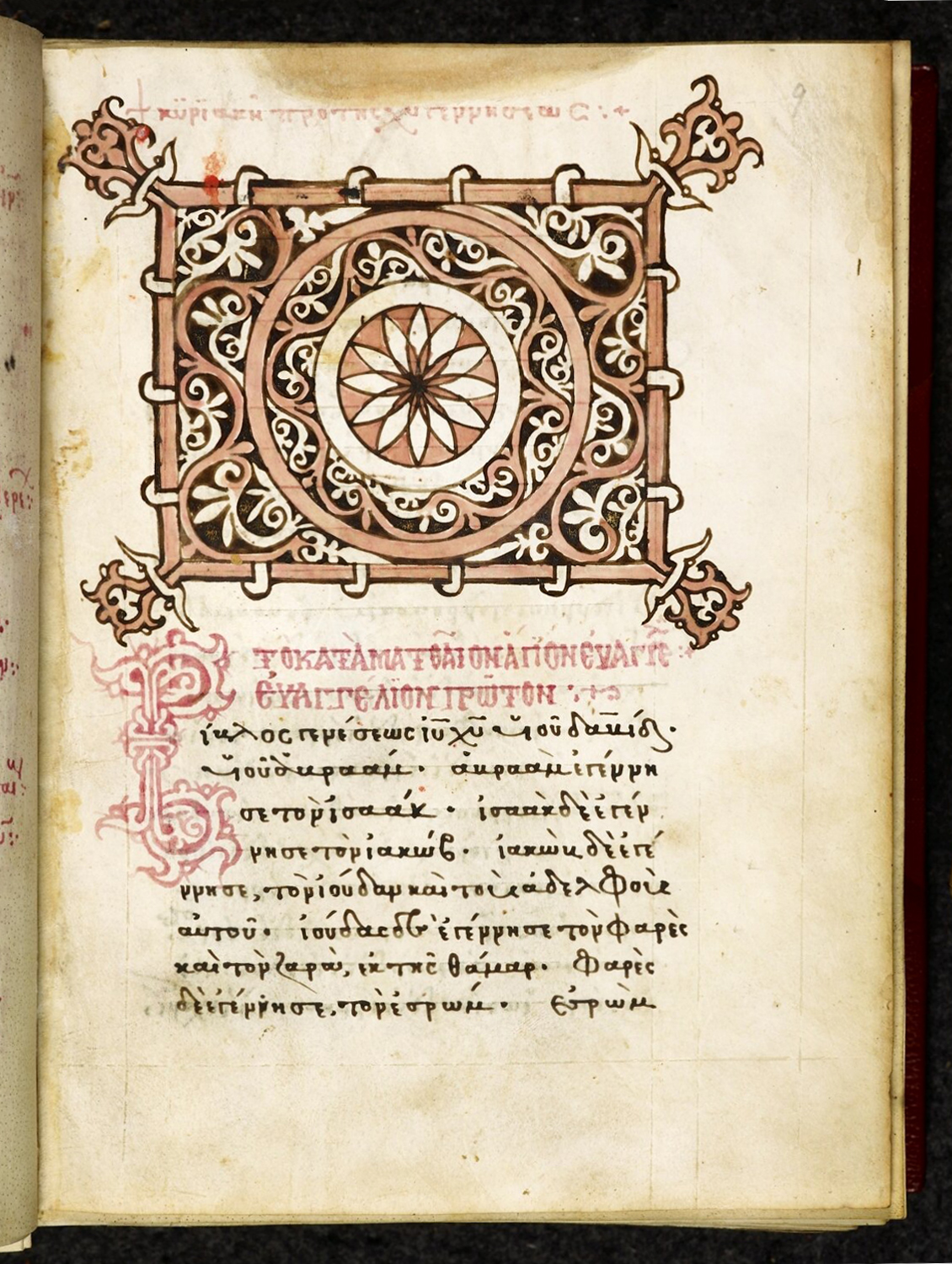
Beginning of the Gospel of Matthew in Folio 9 of Minuscule 447 from 15th century.

A New Testament minuscule is a copy of a portion of the New Testament written in a small, cursive Greek script (developed from Uncial).

== Legend ==
- The numbers (#) are the now standard system of Caspar René Gregory, often referred to as the Gregory-Aland numbers.
- Included among the cataloged minuscules are the following types of manuscripts, color coded:

Grey represents continuous text manuscripts containing only New Testament portions
Beige represents manuscripts with New Testament portions and a catena (quotations from church fathers)
Light cyan represents manuscripts of single-author commentaries who included the full Scripture text.
Light red represents manuscripts of single-author commentaries who included both the full Scripture text and a catena.
Light purple represents manuscripts of commentaries where the Scripture text was abridged.
White represents manuscript numbers no longer in use.

- Dates are estimated to the nearest 100 year increment where specific date is unknown.
- Content generally only describes sections of the New Testament: Gospels, The Acts of the Apostles (Acts), Pauline epistles, and so on. Sometimes the surviving portion of a codex is so limited that specific books, chapters or even verses can be indicated. Linked articles, where they exist, generally specify content in detail, by verse.
- Digital images are referenced with direct links to the hosting web pages, with the exception of those at the INTF. The quality and accessibility of the images is as follows:

Gold color indicates high resolution color images available online.
Tan color indicates high resolution color images available locally, not online.
Light tan color indicates only a small fraction of manuscript pages with color images available online.
Light gray color indicates black/white or microfilm images available online.
Light blue color indicates manuscript not imaged, and is currently lost or ownership unknown.
Light pink color indicates manuscript destroyed, presumed destroyed, or deemed too fragile to digitize.
Violet color indicates high resolution ultraviolet images available online.

† Indicates the manuscript has damaged or missing pages.
^{P} Indicates only a portion of the books were included.
^{K} Indicates manuscript also includes a commentary.
^{S} Indicates lost portions of manuscript replaced via supplement of a later hand.
^{abs} (abschrift) Indicates manuscript is copy.
[ ] Brackets around Gregory-Aland number indicate the manuscript belongs to an already numbered manuscript, was found to not be a continuous text manuscript, was found to be written in modern Greek versus Koine Greek, was proved a forgery, or has been destroyed.

== Minuscules 401-500 ==
#	Date	Contents	Pages	Institution and refs.	City, State	Country	Images
401	12th	Gospels†	113	Victor Emmanuel III National Library, Ms. II. A. 3	Naples	Italy	INTF
402	14th	Gospels	253	Victor Emmanuel III National Library, Ms. II. A. 5	Naples	Italy	INTF
403	13th	Gospels†	212	Victor Emmanuel III National Library, Ms. II. A. 4	Naples	Italy	INTF
404	13th	Acts, Pauline Epistles, General Epistles	157	Austrian National Library, Theol. gr. 313	Vienna	Austria	INTF, CSNTM
405	10th	Gospels†	223	Marciana National Library, Gr. I,10 (946)	Venice	Italy	INTF
406	11th	Gospels†	297	Marciana National Library, Gr. I,11 (1275)	Venice	Italy	INTF
407	12th	Luke† 5:30-24:53, John 1:1-9:2†	87	Marciana National Library, Gr. I,12 (434)	Venice	Italy	INTF
408	12th	Gospels	261	Marciana National Library, Gr. I,14 (1119)	Venice	Italy	INTF
409	14th	Gospels	210	Marciana National Library, Gr. I,15 (947)	Venice	Italy	INTF
410	13th	Gospels	213	Marciana National Library, Gr. I,17 (1211)	Venice	Italy	INTF
411	10th	Gospels	375	Marciana National Library, Gr. I,18 (1276)	Venice	Italy	INTF
412	1301	Gospels	329	Marciana National Library, Gr. I,19 (1416)	Venice	Italy	INTF
413	1302	Gospels	266	Marciana National Library, Gr. I,20 (1256)	Venice	Italy	INTF
414	14th	Gospels†	225	Marciana National Library, Gr. I,21 (1212)	Venice	Italy	INTF
415	1356	Gospels	226	Marciana National Library, Gr. I,22 (1417)	Venice	Italy	INTF
416	14th	Gospels†	153	Marciana National Library, Gr. I,24 (948)	Venice	Italy	INTF
417	14th	Matthew, Mark, and Luke†	112	Marciana National Library, Gr. I,25 (1356)	Venice	Italy	INTF
418	15th	Matthew, Mark 1:1-13:32†	120	Marciana National Library, Gr. I,28 (1450)	Venice	Italy	INTF
419	12th	Gospels†	262	Marciana National Library, Gr. I,60 (950)	Venice	Italy	INTF
420	10th	Matthew, Mark	127	University Library, F. V. 18	Messina	Italy	INTF
421	ca. 1300	Acts, Pauline Epistles, General Epistles	279	Austrian National Library, Theol. gr. 303	Vienna	Austria	INTF, CSNTM
422	11th	Gospels	256	Bavarian State Library, Cod.graec. 210	Munich	Germany	BSB
422	11th	Gospels	256	Bavarian State Library, Cod.graec. 210	Munich	Germany	INTF, CSNTM
423	1556	Matthew, John (Nicetas Catena)	465	Bavarian State Library, Cod.graec. 36, 37	Munich	Germany	INTF
424	11th	Acts, Pauline Epistles, General Epistles, Revelation	353	Austrian National Library, Theol. gr. 302	Vienna	Austria	INTF, CSNTM
425	1330	Acts, Pauline Epistles, General Epistles	159	Austrian National Library, Theol. gr. 221	Vienna	Austria	INTF, CSNTM
426	14th	Luke† 6:17–11:28 (Nicetas Catena)	208	Bavarian State Library, Cod.graec. 473	Munich	Germany	BSB, INTF
427	13th	Theophylact Commentary on Mark, Luke	140	Bavarian State Library, Cod.graec. 465	Munich	Germany	BSB, CSNTM, INTF
428	13th	Theophylact Commentary on the Gospels	335	Bavarian State Library, Cod.graec. 381	Munich	Germany	BSB, INTF
429	14th	Acts, Pauline Epistles, General Epistles	185	Herzog August Library, Codd. Aug. 16. 7. 4	Wolfenbüttel	Germany	INTF
430	11th	John 1:1–8:14† (Nicetas Catena)	366	Bavarian State Library, Cod.graec. 437	Munich	Germany	BSB, INTF
431	12th	Gospels, Acts, Pauline Epistles, General Epistles	275	Priesterseminarium, 1	Strasbourg	France	INTF
432	15th	Acts, Pauline Epistles, General Epistles, Book of Revelation	218	Vatican Library, Vat.gr.366	Vatican City	Vatican	DVL, INTF
433	11th	Gospels†	80	Jagiellonian Library, Graec. qu. 12	Kraków	Poland	INTF
434	13th	Luke 1:5–6:21† (Nicetas Catena)	424	Austrian National Library, Theol. Gr. 71	Vienna	Austria	INTF, CSNTM
435 + [576]	12th/13th	Gospels†	285	Leiden University Library, Gronov. 137	Leiden	Netherlands	LUL
435 + [576]	12th/13th	Matthew 22:4–19	1	Arundel Castle, M. D. 459, 1 fol.	Arundel, West Sussex	UK	CSNTM
436	11th/12th	Acts, Pauline Epistles, General Epistles	165	Vatican Library, Vat.gr.367	Vatican City	Vatican	INTF
437	11th	Acts	257	Vatican Library, Vat.gr.760	Vatican City	Vatican	INTF
438	12th	Gospels	452	British Library, Add MS 5111, Add MS 5112	London	UK	BL
438	12th	Gospels	452	British Library, Add MS 5111, Add MS 5112	London	UK	INTF
439	1159	Gospels	219	British Library, Add MS 5107	London	UK	BL
439	1159	Gospels	219	British Library, Add MS 5107	London	UK	INTF
440	12th	Gospels, Acts, Pauline Epistles, General Epistles	294	Cambridge University Library, Mm. 6.9	Cambridge	UK	INTF, CSNTM
440	12th	Gospels, Acts, Pauline Epistles, General Epistles	294	Cambridge University Library, Mm. 6.9	Cambridge	UK	CSNTM
441	13th	Acts† 8:14-28:31, Romans, 1 Corinthians 1:1-15:38†	90	Uppsala University, Gr. 1, p. 3–182	Uppsala	Sweden	UU
441	13th	Acts† 8:14-28:31, Romans, 1 Corinthians 1:1-15:38†	90	Uppsala University, Gr. 1, p. 3–182	Uppsala	Sweden	INTF
442	12th/13th	Pauline Epistles†, General Epistles	129	Uppsala University, Gr. 1, p. 183–440	Uppsala	Sweden	UU
442	12th/13th	Pauline Epistles†, General Epistles	129	Uppsala University, Gr. 1, p. 183–440	Uppsala	Sweden	INTF
443	12th	Gospels	235	Cambridge University Library, Nn. 2.36	Cambridge	UK	INTF, CSNTM
444	15th	Gospels, Acts, Pauline Epistles, General Epistles	324	British Library, Harley MS 5796	London	UK	BL
444	15th	Gospels, Acts, Pauline Epistles, General Epistles	324	British Library, Harley MS 5796	London	UK	INTF
445	1506	Gospels	194	British Library, Harley MS 5736	London	UK	BL
445	1506	Gospels	194	British Library, Harley MS 5736	London	UK	INTF
446	15th	Gospels†	228	British Library, Harley MS 5777	London	UK	BL
446	15th	Gospels†	228	British Library, Harley MS 5777	London	UK	INTF
447	15th	Gospels	329	British Library, Harley MS 5784	London	UK	BL
447	15th	Gospels	329	British Library, Harley MS 5784	London	UK	INTF
448	1478	Gospels	299	British Library, Harley MS 5790	London	UK	BL
448	1478	Gospels	299	British Library, Harley MS 5790	London	UK	INTF
449	13th	Gospels	317	British Library, Add MS 4950	London	UK	BL
449	13th	Gospels	317	British Library, Add MS 4950	London	UK	INTF
450	10th	Acts, Romans - Ephesians†, General Epistles	177	Vatican Library, Reg.Gr.29	Vatican City	Vatican	DVL, INTF
451	11th	Acts, Pauline Epistles, General Epistles	161	Vatican Library, Urb.Gr.3	Vatican City	Vatican	INTF
452	14th	Acts, Pauline Epistles, General Epistles	327	Vatican Library, Reg.gr.Pio.II.50	Vatican City	Vatican	INTF
453	14th	Acts, General Epistles	295	Vatican Library, Barb.gr.582	Vatican City	Vatican	INTF
454	10th	Acts, Pauline Epistles, General Epistles	244	Laurentian Library, Plut.04.01	Florence	Italy	BML, INTF
455	13th/14th	Theophylact Commentary on Acts, Pauline Epistles	285	Laurentian Library, Plut.04.05	Florence	Italy	BML, INTF
456	10th	Acts, Pauline Epistles, General Epistles, Revelation	377	Laurentian Library, Plut.04.30	Florence	Italy	BML, INTF
457	10th	Acts, Pauline Epistles, General Epistles	294	Laurentian Library, Plut.04.29	Florence	Italy	BML, INTF
458	11th	Acts, Pauline Epistles, General Epistles	276	Laurentian Library, Plut.04.31	Florence	Italy	BML, INTF
459	1092	Acts, Pauline Epistles, General Epistles, Revelation	276	Laurentian Library, Plut.04.32	Florence	Italy	BML, INTF
460	13th/14th	Acts†, Pauline Epistles†, General Epistles	302	Marciana National Library, Gr. Z. 11 (379)	Venice	Italy	IC
460	13th/14th	Acts†, Pauline Epistles†, General Epistles	302	Marciana National Library, Gr. Z. 11 (379)	Venice	Italy	INTF, CSNTM
461	835	Gospels	344	National Library of Russia, Gr. 219, 213 101	Saint Petersburg	Russia	INTF, CSNTM
462	13th	Acts, Pauline Epistles, General Epistles	240	State Historical Museum, V. 24, S. 346	Moscow	Russia	INTF
463	12th	Acts†, Pauline Epistles†, General Epistles†	235	State Historical Museum, V. 95, S. 346	Moscow	Russia	INTF
[464]=252							
465	11th	Acts, Pauline Epistles, General Epistles	157	National Library, Grec 57	Paris	France	BnF, INTF, CSNTM
466	11th	Acts†, Pauline Epistles†, General Epistles	174	National Library, Grec 58	Paris	France	BnF, INTF, CSNTM
467	15th	Acts, Pauline Epistles, General Epistles, Revelation	331	National Library, Grec 59	Paris	France	BnF, INTF
468	13th	Acts†, Pauline Epistles, General Epistles, Revelation	200	National Library, Grec 101	Paris	France	INTF
469	13th	Acts, Pauline Epistles†, General Epistles, Revelation	229	National Library, Grec 102 A	Paris	France	BnF, INTF
470	11th	Gospels	215	Lambeth Palace, MS1175	London	UK	LP
470	11th	Gospels	215	Lambeth Palace, MS1175	London	UK	INTF
471	12th	Gospels	240	Lambeth Palace, MS1176	London	UK	LP, INTF
472	13th	Gospels†	210	Lambeth Palace, MS1177	London	UK	LP
472	13th	Gospels†	210	Lambeth Palace, MS1177	London	UK	INTF
473	11th	Gospels	310	Lambeth Palace, MS1178	London	UK	LP, INTF
473	11th	Gospels	310	Lambeth Palace, MS1178	London	UK	CSNTM
474	11th	Gospels†	176	Lambeth Palace, MS1179	London	UK	LP, INTF
475	11th	Gospels†	272	Lambeth Palace, MS1192	London	UK	CSNTM
475	11th	Gospels†	272	Lambeth Palace, MS1192	London	UK	LP, INTF
476	11th	Gospels	218	British Library, Arundel MS 524	London	UK	BL
476	11th	Gospels	218	British Library, Arundel MS 524	London	UK	INTF
477	13th	Gospels	318	Trinity College, B. X. 17	Cambridge	UK	INTF
478	10th	Gospels	268	British Library, Add MS 11300	London	UK	BL
478	10th	Gospels	268	British Library, Add MS 11300	London	UK	INTF
479	13th	Gospels, Acts, Pauline Epistles, General Epistles	289	University of Birmingham Cadbury Research Library, Mingana Gr. 3	Birmingham	UK	UoB
479	13th	Gospels, Acts, Pauline Epistles, General Epistles	289	University of Birmingham Cadbury Research Library, Mingana Gr. 3	Birmingham	UK	INTF
480	1366	Gospels, Hebrews†	222	British Library, Burney MS 18	London	UK	BL
480	1366	Gospels, Hebrews†	222	British Library, Burney MS 18	London	UK	INTF, CSNTM
480	1366	Acts, General Epistles, Pauline Epistles	232	Destroyed, formerly: (Metz, Bibl. minuc., 4)			
481	10th	Gospels	218	British Library, Burney MS 19	London	UK	BL
481	10th	Gospels	218	British Library, Burney MS 19	London	UK	INTF
482	1285	Gospels	317	British Library, Burney MS 20	London	UK	BL, INTF
483	1295	Gospels, Acts, Pauline Epistles, General Epistles	361	Williams College, Chapin Libr., Cod. De Ricci, no. 1	Williamstown, MA	USA	INTF
484	1291-1292	Gospels	258	British Library, Burney MS 21	London	UK	BL
485	12th	Gospels†	230	British Library, Burney MS 23	London	UK	BL
486	15th	John	51	Lambeth Palace, MS2794, fol. 317-367	London	UK	LP
486	15th	John	51	Lambeth Palace, MS2794, fol. 317-367	London	UK	INTF, CSNTM
[487] = 1321							
[488] = 1326							
489	1315-6	Gospels, Acts†, Pauline Epistles, General Epistles	363	Trinity College, B. X. 16	Cambridge	UK	INTF, CSNTM
490	11th	Gospels†	192	British Library, Add MS 7141	London	UK	BL
491	11th	Gospels†, Acts†, Pauline Epistles, General Epistles	305	British Library, Add MS 11836	London	UK	BL
491	11th	Gospels†, Acts†, Pauline Epistles, General Epistles	305	British Library, Add MS 11836	London	UK	INTF
492	1325-6	Gospels	269	British Library, Add MS 11838	London	UK	BL
493	15th	Gospels†	157	British Library, Add MS 11839	London	UK	BL
494	14th	Gospels†	222	British Library, Add MS 32341	London	UK	BL
494	14th	Gospels†	222	British Library, Add MS 32341	London	UK	INTF
495	12th	Gospels	181	British Library, Add MS 16183	London	UK	BL
495	12th	Gospels	181	British Library, Add MS 16183	London	UK	INTF
496	13th	Gospels, Acts, Pauline Epistles, General Epistles	300	British Library, Add MS 16184	London	UK	BL
496	13th	Gospels, Acts, Pauline Epistles, General Epistles	300	British Library, Add MS 16184	London	UK	INTF
497	11th	Gospels	184	British Library, Add MS 16943	London	UK	BL
498	13th	New Testament†	186	British Library, Add MS 17469	London	UK	BL
498	13th	New Testament†	186	British Library, Add MS 17469	London	UK	INTF
499	12th	Gospels†	216	British Library, Add MS 17741	London	UK	BL
500	13th	Matthew, Mark, Luke†	244	British Library, Add MS 17982	London	UK	BL
500	13th	Matthew, Mark, Luke†	244	British Library, Add MS 17982	London	UK	INTF

[top]

== Gallery ==
Some manuscripts

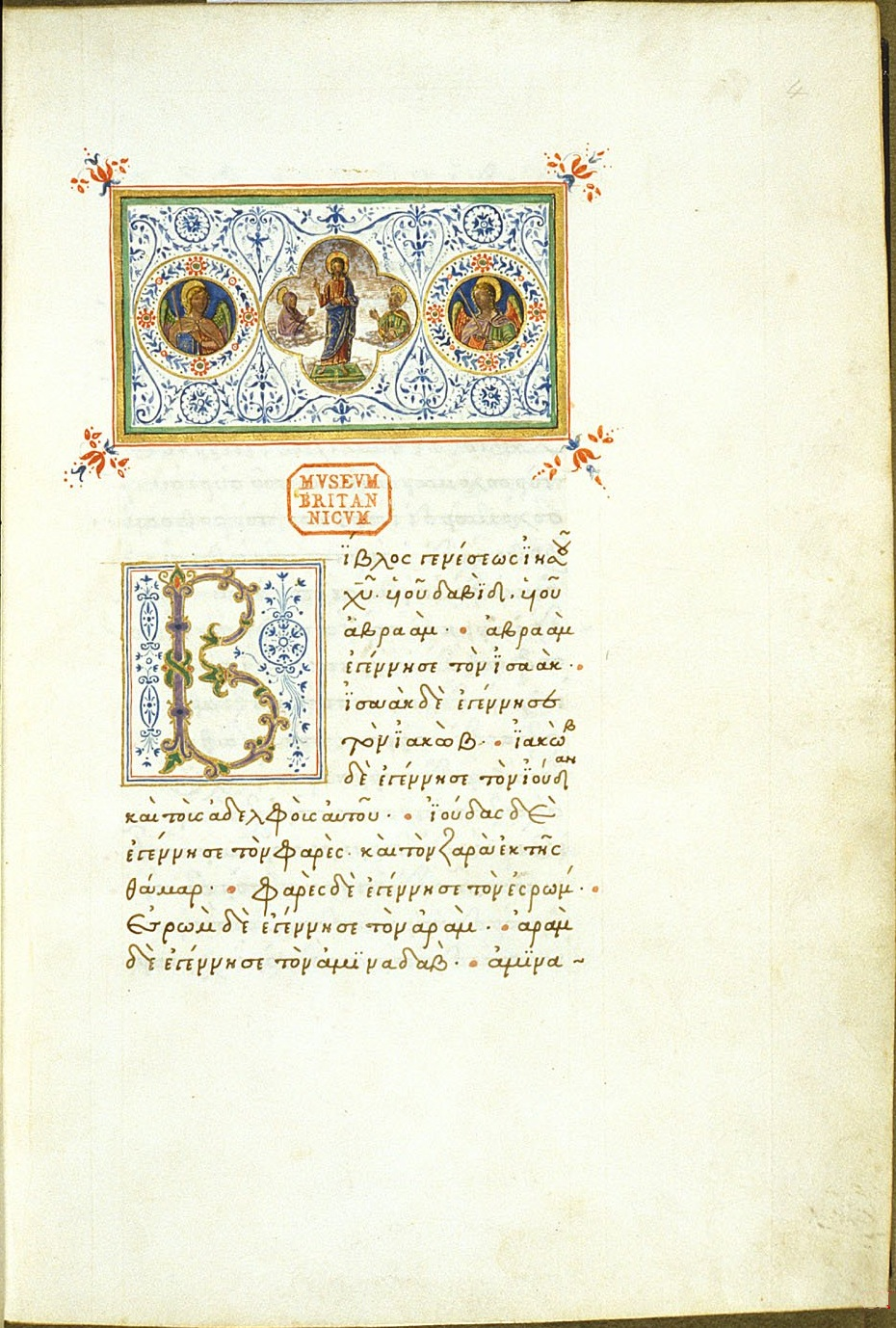
Minuscule 448

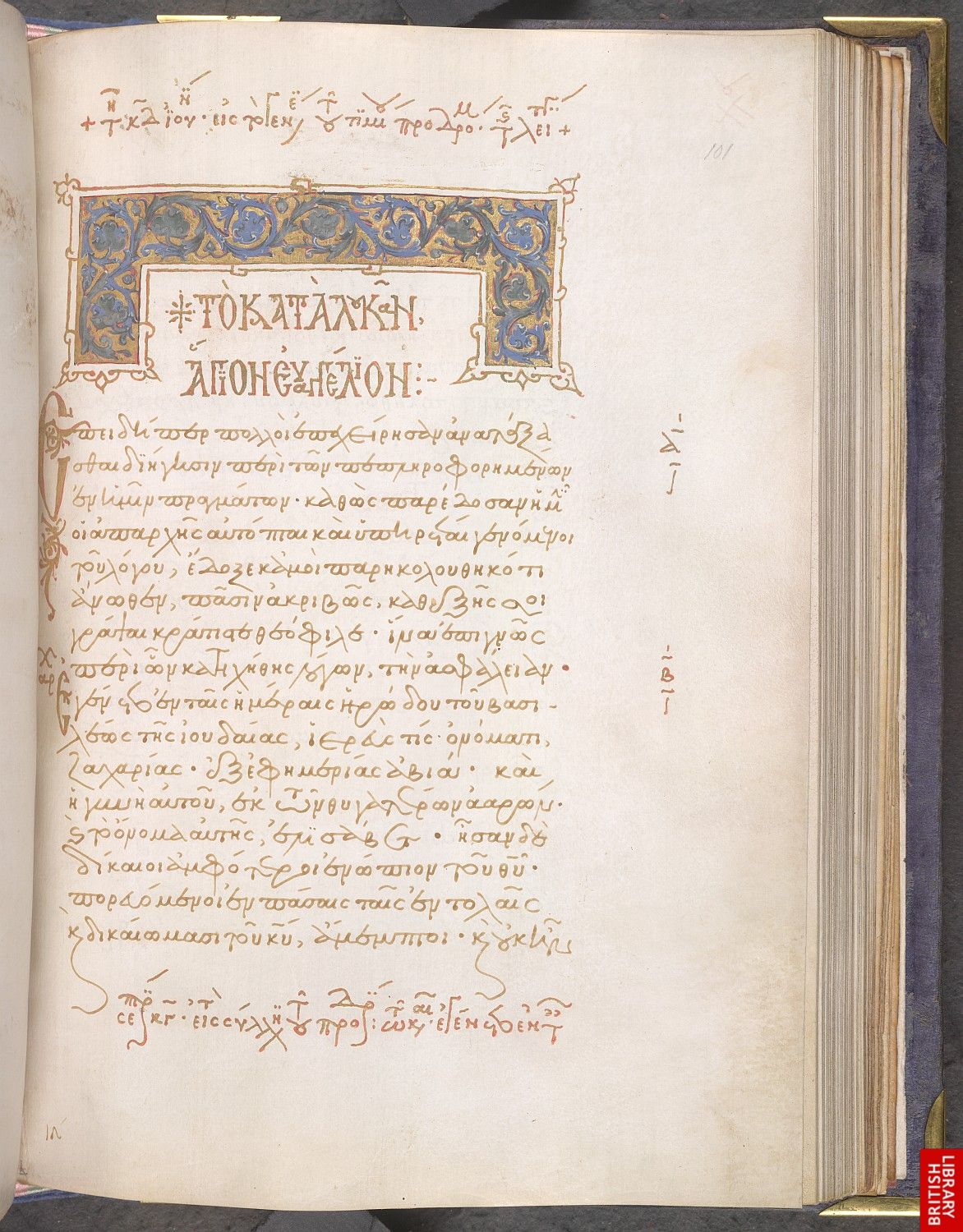
Minuscule 480

== See also ==
- List of New Testament papyri
- List of New Testament uncials
- List of New Testament minuscules (1–1000)
- List of New Testament minuscules (1001–2000)
- List of New Testament minuscules (2001–)
- List of New Testament minuscules ordered by Location/Institution
- List of New Testament lectionaries

== Bibliography ==
- Aland, Kurt; M. Welte; B. Köster; K. Junack (1994). Kurzgefasste Liste der griechischen Handschriften des Neues Testaments. Berlin, New York: Walter de Gruyter. p. 95. ISBN 3-11-011986-2.
- "Liste Handschriften". Münster: Institute for New Testament Textual Research.
