= Minuscule 410 =

- New Testament manuscript
- Text: Gospels
- Date: 13th century
- Script: Greek
- Now at: Biblioteca Marciana
- Size: 23.5 cm by 16.5 cm
- Type: Byzantine text-type
- Category: V
- Note: full marginalia

Minuscule 410 is a Greek minuscule manuscript of the New Testament, made of cotton paper. It is designated by the siglum 410 in the Gregory-Aland numbering of New Testament manuscripts, and ε 318 in the von Soden numbering of New Testament manuscripts. Using the study of comparative writing styles (palaeography), it has been assigned to the 13th century. The marginal apparatus is full. The manuscript was prepared for the Church liturgical readings.

== Description ==
The manuscript is a codex (precursor to the modern book format), containing the complete text of the four Gospels on 213 paper leaves (sized 23.5 cm by 16.5 cm). The text is written in one column per page, in 28 lines per page.

The text is divided according to the chapters (known as κεφαλαια / kephalaia), whose numbers are given in the margin, and their titles (known as τιτλοι / titloi) written at the top of the pages. There is also a division according to the Ammonian Sections with their numbers written in the margin, but there are no references to the Eusebian Canons.

It contains the Epistle to Carpian, the Eusebian Canon tables, Prolegomena, tables of contents (also known as κεφαλαια) before each Gospel, lectionary markings in the margin, a Synaxarion, a Menologion, subscriptions at the end of each Gospel, with the numbers of lines (known as στιχοι / stichoi). The Epistle to Carpian, Eusebian tables, and the Prolegomena are written on parchment compared to the cotton paper of the rest of the manuscript, also possibly from the 13th century.

== Text ==
The Greek text of the codex is considered to be a representative of the Byzantine text-type. Textual critic Hermann von Soden classified it to the textual family K^{x}. According to the Claremont Profile Method (a specific analysis of textual data), it represents textual cluster M349 in Luke 1, Luke 10, and Luke 20.

Biblical scholar Kurt Aland placed it in Category V of his New Testament manuscript classification system. Category V manuscripts are described as "manuscripts with a purely or predominantly Byzantine text."

== History ==
The earliest history of the manuscript is unknown. It was written by a monk named Joasaph. Wiedmann and J. G. J. Braun collated portions of the manuscript for textual critic Johann M. A. Scholz (1794-1852), who added it to the list of New Testament manuscripts. Biblical scholar Caspar René Gregory saw it in 1886.

It is presently dated by the INTF to the 13th century. It is currently housed at the Biblioteca Marciana (shelf number Gr. I. 17) in Venice.

== See also ==
- Minuscule 411
- Minuscule 409
- List of New Testament minuscules
- Biblical manuscript
- Textual criticism
