= Giovanni Gaetano Bottari =

Italian scholar and theologian

Reverend Giovanni Gaetano Bottari
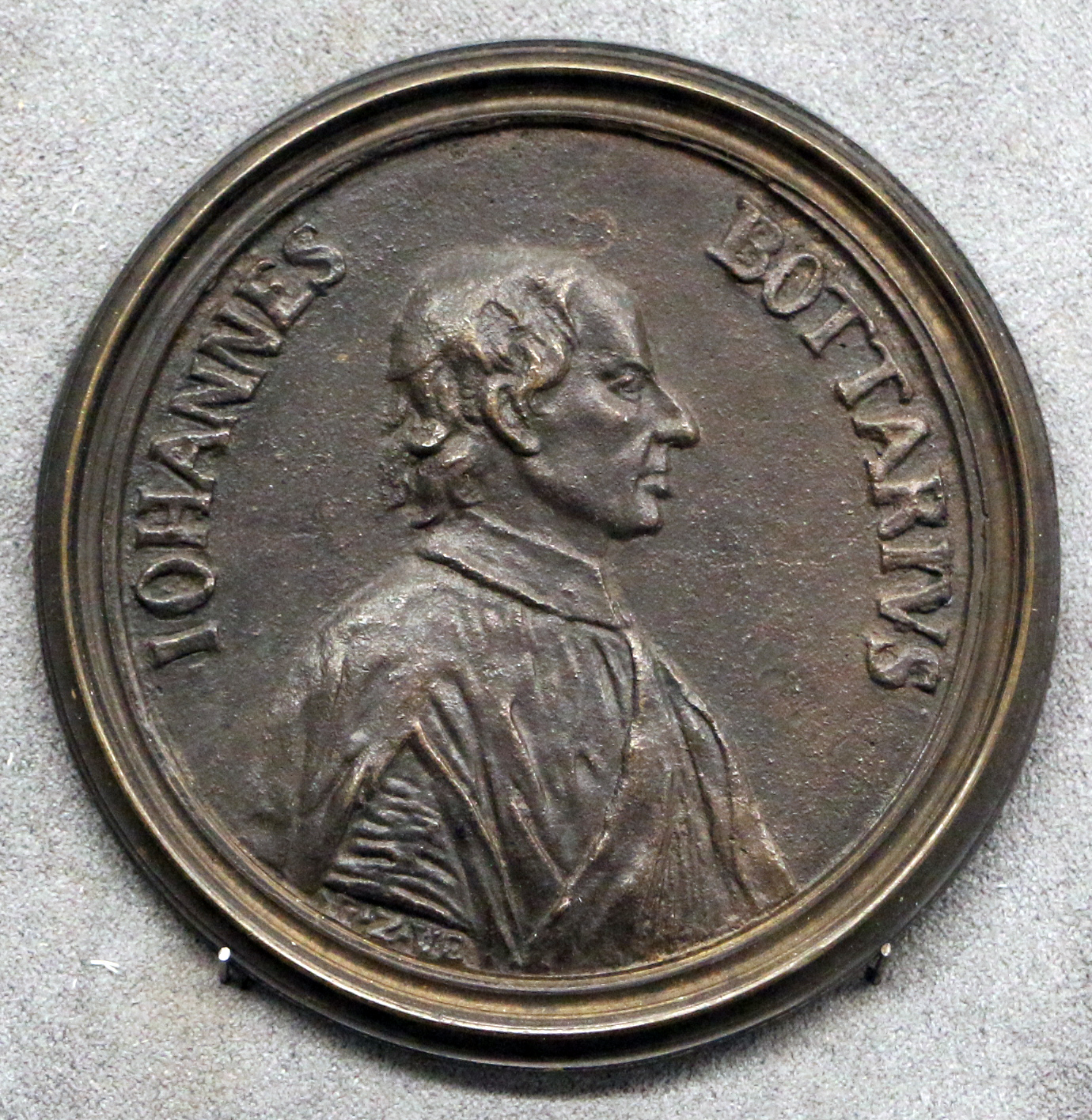
- Giovanni Gaetano Bottari, medal by Giovanni Zanobi Weber
- Born: January 15, 1689; Florence, Grand Duchy of Tuscany
- Died: 5 June 1775 (aged 86); Rome, Papal States
- Occupations: Catholic priest, art historian, classicist
- Known for: Raccolta di lettere sulla pittura, scultura e architettura, Rome, 1757–68
- Parent(s): Antonio Bottari and Anna Bottari (née Morelli)

Academic work
- Discipline: History of art
- Institutions: Sapienza University of Rome

Giovanni Gaetano Bottari (15 January 1689 – 5 June 1775) was an Italian scholar and theologian. He was advisor to Cardinal Neri Maria Corsini, Vatican librarian and counsellor to Pope Clement XII. His special interests were the literature of Tuscany during the 14th and 15th centuries, medieval and contemporary art, sacred archaeology and ecclesiastical history.

== Biography ==
Giovanni Gaetano Bottari was born in Florence on 15 January 1689. He studied Latin under the guidance of Antonio Maria Biscioni. From 1704 to 1708 he attended courses in theology at the Dominican convent of San Marco. He studied Greek with the celebrated Hellenist Anton Maria Salvini. He took holy orders and in 1716 and entered the service of the Corsini family.

Bottari was a keen scholar of art. In 1730, he brought out a new edition of Raffaello Borghini's Il Riposo and wrote the Dialoghi sopra le tre arti del disegno, which was published some years later (Lucca, 1754). The artistic theories he expressed in these works owed something to Ludovico Antonio Muratori and were influenced by a view of works of art as documents of their time. He exalted the classical traditions of Tuscan art in the early and high Renaissance, praised the classicism of the Carracci and bluntly opposed Mannerist and Baroque art. In the Dialoghi he demonstrated a practical interest, unusual for the period, in methods of restoring and conserving artefacts.

Bottari served the Corsini family from 1718, in Florence at first and then in Rome, where he was summoned in 1730 by Lorenzo Corsini, who had just been elected Pope as Clement XII. Bottari was given the chair of Ecclesiastical History at the Sapienza University of Rome and the task of librarian to both the Pope and to his nephew, Cardinal Neri Corsini. The Palazzo Corsini, where Bottari lived, became a meeting-place for scholars and ecclesiastics, giving rise, in mid-century, to the famous group known as ‘dell’Archetto’, champions of Jansenism against the Jesuits. Many original copies of his publications are held in the library of the Accademia dei Lincei in the Palazzo Corsini, Rome in Rome.

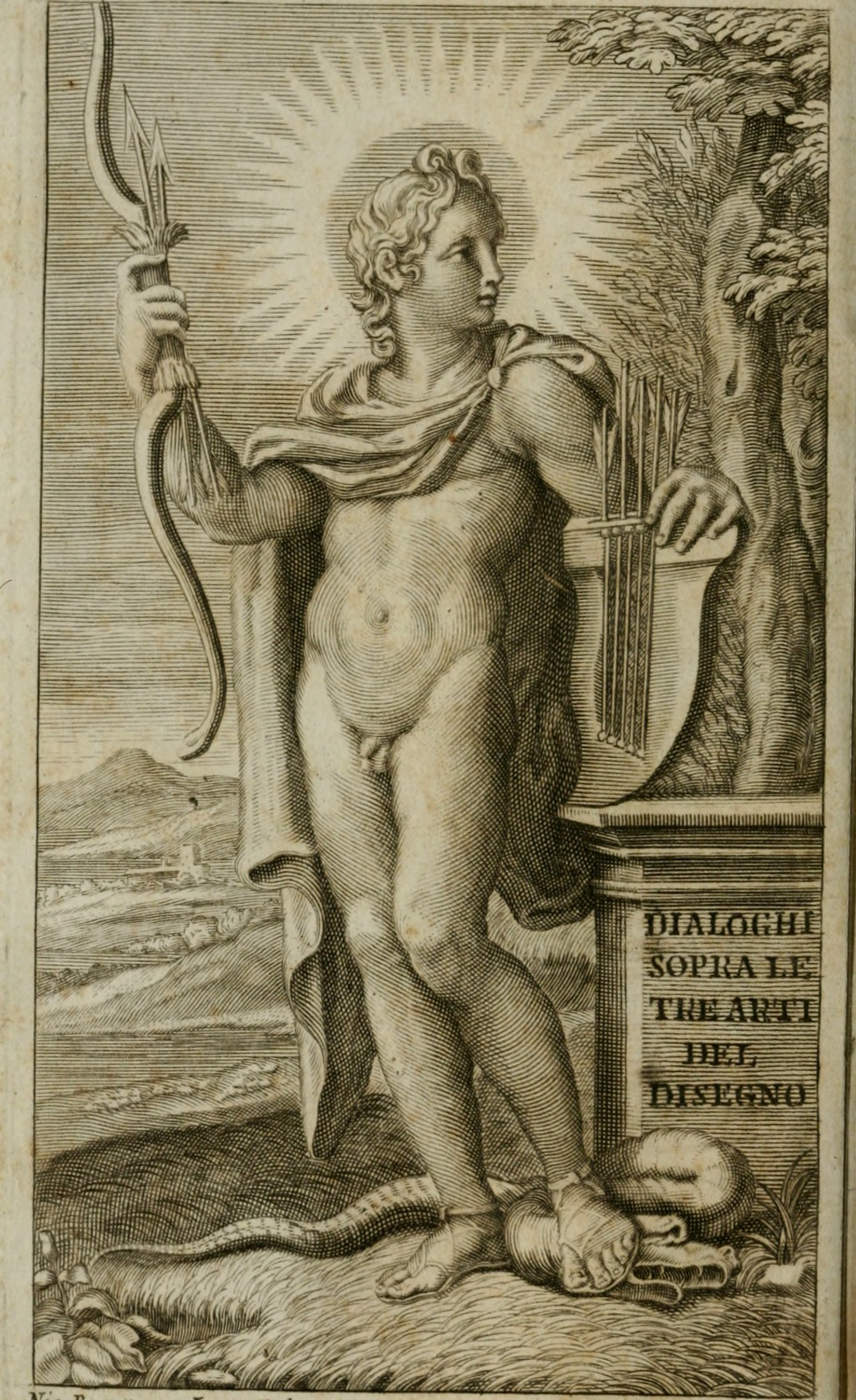
Dialoghi sopra le tre arti del disegno, Rome, 1770

For Clement XII Bottari built up one of the most celebrated private libraries of the time; it was particularly rich in historical, legal, ecclesiastical and artistic material and included a vast collection of prints and drawings, which was cited in contemporary guidebooks as one of the best collections of graphic work in existence. He was especially interested in prints that reproduced works of art and thus provided a valuable study resource for artists and critics. He acquired the drawings mainly for Cardinal Corsini; he collected them together in volumes and marked the folios, neatly but not always reliably, with attributions.

Bottari corresponded on books and the art market with learned Europeans, among them the collector Pierre-Jean Mariette in Paris, Giampietro Zanotti and Luigi Crespi in Bologna and Niccolò Gabburri and the archaeologist Antonio Francesco Gori in Florence. In Rome his artist friends, in particular the engravers Giuseppe Vasi, Giovanni Domenico Campiglia and Giovanni Battista Piranesi (of whose work he was especially fond), gave him the information and contacts that enabled him to advise Cardinal Corsini on the acquisition of a rich collection of pictures and antiques (Rome, Palazzo Corsini).

In 1735 Bottari became Clement XII’s private chaplain and the following year was given the task of editing a new edition of Antonio Bosio’s Roma sotterranea, which came out in three volumes under the title Sculture e pitture sagre estratte dai cimiteri di Roma (Rome, 1737, 1747, 1754). His interest in ancient Christian monuments was informed by a nostalgia for the spiritual and moral purity of the early Christians. This concern for the documentary aspect of works of art inspired the compilation of the monumental four-volume Il Museo Capitolino (vols 1 and 2 (1741) on sculpture; 3 (1755) on portraits; and 4, published posthumously (1782) with a text by Niccolò Foggini, on reliefs). This was the Capitoline Museums’ first catalogue, illustrated with engraved plates from drawings by Campiglia and complete with tabulated historical and iconographic commentary.

In 1756 Bottari undertook his most significant work of art scholarship, the celebrated Raccolta di lettere sulla pittura, scultura e architettura, which came out in six volumes (Rome, 1757–68) and later included a seventh volume (1773), compiled by Luigi Crespi. It is a collection of letters on painting, sculpture and architecture from the 15th to the 18th century, culled from Roman archives, libraries and private collections, and was intended to provide useful material for art historians and artists’ biographers. It also includes some highly informative letters from Bottari’s contemporaries, and these provide a rich picture of cultural and artistic life in 18th-century Europe. Bottari’s favourite themes are touched upon in the Raccolta: discussions on techniques of restoring, the opportunities for making such interventions, the problems of collecting, the keeping of records on picture sales, and theoretical disquisitions on topical issues.

During these years Bottari also produced his edition in three volumes, with commentary, of Giorgio Vasari’s Lives (Rome, 1759–60). This, the first modern edition, was prefaced by a lengthy introduction in which Bottari reaffirmed Florence’s artistic primacy and urged respect for the proper identification and attribution of works of art.

Bottari was principal editor of the new edition of the Vocabolario degli Accademici della Crusca (1729–1737) and of the celebrated Vatican edition of Virgil (1741). He probably collaborated on Piranesi's answers to the letters of Pierre-Jean Mariette. Piranesi dedicated his Antichità Romane de' Tempi della Repubblica to him.

== Selected Works ==
- Bottari, Giovanni Gaetano (1734). Storia de' ss. Barlaam e Giosaffatte [History of the Saints Barlaam and Josaphat]. Rome: Salvioni.
- Bottari, Giovanni Gaetano (1754). Dialoghi sopra le tre arti del disegno [Dialogues on the Three Arts of Drawing]. Lucca: Benedini.
- Bottari, Giovanni Gaetano (1757). Raccolta di Lettere sulla Pittura, Scultura, ed Architettura. Vol. 1. Rome: Pagliarini.
- Bottari, Giovanni Gaetano (1757). Raccolta di Lettere sulla Pittura, Scultura, ed Architettura. Vol. 2. Rome: Pagliarini.
- Bottari, Giovanni Gaetano (1759). Raccolta di Lettere sulla Pittura, Scultura, ed Architettura. Vol. 3. Rome: Pagliarini.
- Bottari, Giovanni Gaetano (1764). Raccolta di Lettere sulla Pittura, Scultura, ed Architettura. Vol. 4. Rome: Pagliarini.
- Bottari, Giovanni Gaetano (1766). Raccolta di Lettere sulla Pittura, Scultura, ed Architettura. Vol. 5. Rome: Pagliarini.
- Bottari, Giovanni Gaetano (1768). Raccolta di Lettere sulla Pittura, Scultura, ed Architettura. Vol. 6. Rome: Stamperia di Pallade.
- Bottari, Giovanni Gaetano (1773). Raccolta di Lettere sulla Pittura, Scultura, ed Architettura. Vol. 7. Rome: Pagliarini.
- Bottari, Giovanni Gaetano (1825). Raccolta di Lettere sulla Pittura, Scultura, ed Architettura. Vol. 8. Continued by Stefano Ticozzi. Rome: Giovanni Silvestre.

== Sources ==
- Petrucci, Armando; Pignatelli, Giuseppe (1971). "BOTTARI, Giovanni Gaetano". Dizionario Biografico degli Italiani (in Italian). Vol. 13: Borremans–Brancazolo. Rome: Institute of the Italian Encyclopaedia. ISBN 978-88-12-00032-6.
- Teyssot, Georges. (1974). Città e utopia nell'illuminismo inglese: George Dance il Giovane. Rome: Officina Edizioni.
- Ripley, George; Dana, Charles A., eds. (1879). "Bottari, Giovanni Gaetano" . The American Cyclopædia.
- Dialoghi sopra le tre arti del disegno. Benedini, Lucca 1754 digital
