= Minuscule 458 =

- New Testament manuscript
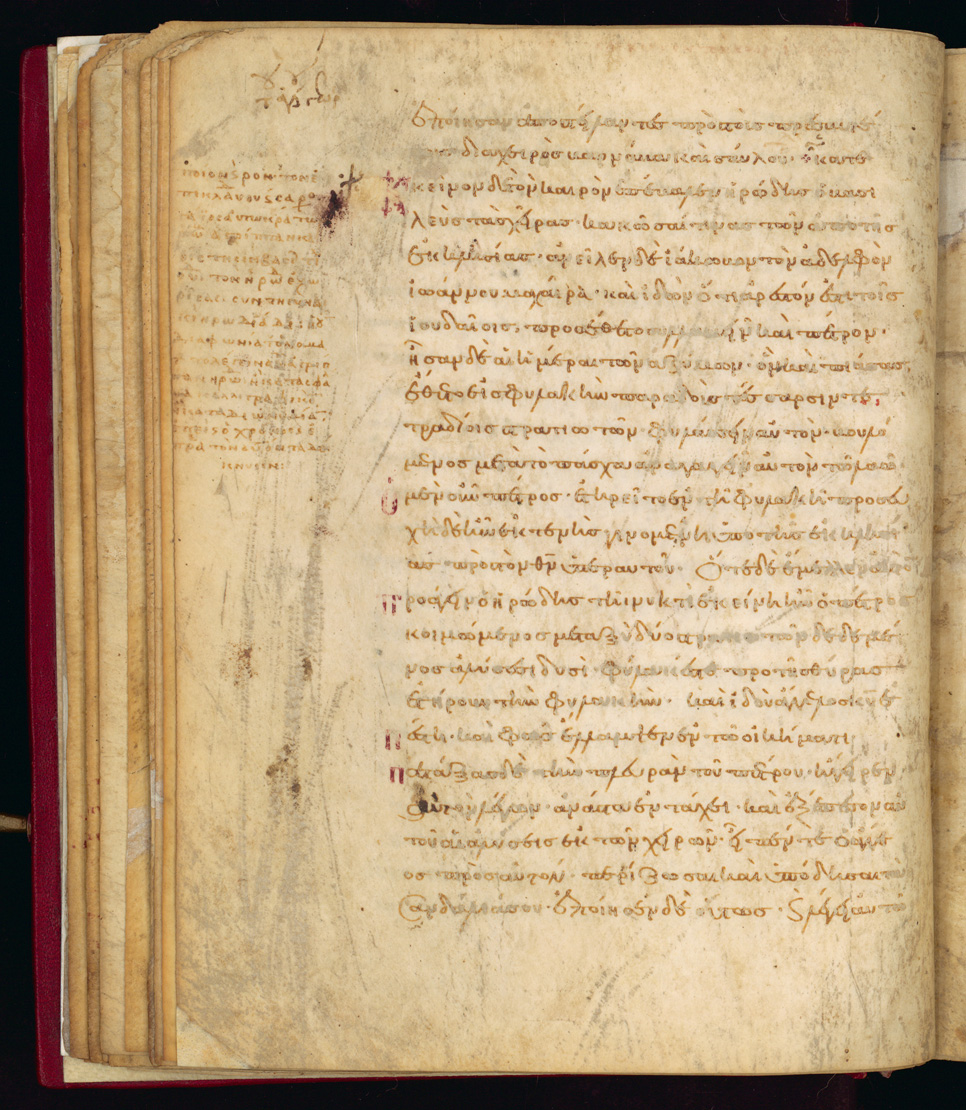
- Folio 22 verso
- Text: Acts of the Apostles, Catholic epistles, Pauline epistles
- Date: 11th century
- Script: Greek
- Now at: Laurentian Library
- Size: 17.5 cm by 14.1 cm
- Type: Byzantine
- Category: V
- Hand: beautifully written

Minuscule 458 (in the Gregory-Aland numbering), α 160 (in the Soden numbering), is a Greek minuscule manuscript of the New Testament, on parchment. Palaeographic analysis suggests the work originated in the 11th century. Formerly it was labeled by 88^{a} and 98^{p}.

== Description ==
The codex contains the text of the Acts of the Apostles, Catholic epistles, and Pauline epistles on 276 parchment leaves (17.5 cm by 14.1 cm) with only one lacunae at the end of Titus. The text is written in one column per page, in 24 lines per page.

The biblical text is divided according to the κεφαλαια (chapters), whose numbers are given at the margin.

It contains Prolegomena, tables of the κεφαλαια (tables of contents) before each sacred books, lectionary markings at the margin (for liturgical use), subscriptions at the end of each book, with numbers of στιχοι.

The order of books: Acts, Catholic epistles, and Pauline epistles.

== Text ==
The Greek text of the codex is a representative of the Byzantine text-type. Aland placed it in Category V.

== History ==
The manuscript was examined and slightly collated by Birch and Scholz. Antonio Maria Biscioni published its facsimile in 1752. C. R. Gregory saw it in 1886.

Formerly it was labeled by 88^{a} and 98^{p}. In 1908 Gregory gave the number 458 to it.

It is currently housed at the Laurentian Library (Plutei IV. 31) in Florence.

== See also ==
- List of New Testament minuscules
- Biblical manuscript
- Textual criticism
