= Minuscule 420 =

- New Testament manuscript
- Name: Messanensis 1
- Text: Matthew, Mark
- Date: 10th century
- Script: Greek
- Now at: Biblioteca Marciana
- Size: 17.3 cm by 13 cm
- Category: none
- Note: marginalia

Minuscule 420 is a Greek minuscule manuscript of the New Testament, made of parchment. It is designated by the siglum 420 in the Gregory-Aland numbering of New Testament manuscripts. Using the study of comparative writing styles (palaeography), it has been assigned to the 10th century. The marginal notes are nearly full, but contain no lectionary markings.

== Description ==
The manuscript is a codex (precursor to the modern book format), containing the text of the Gospel of Matthew and Gospel of Mark on 127 parchment leaves (sized 17.3 cm by 13 cm). It is written in one column per page, in 22 lines per page.

The text is divided according to the chapters (known as κεφαλαια / kephalaia), whose numbers are given in the margin, and their titles (known as τιτλοι / titloi) written at the top of the pages. There is also a division according to the Ammonian Sections (241 in Mark, the last in 16:20), with references to the Eusebian Canons written below the Ammonian Section numbers. It contains the Epistle to Carpian, Eusebian Canon tables, Prolegomena (προγραμμα) to the four Gospels, tables of contents (also known as κεφαλαια) before each Gospel, subscriptions at the end of each Gospel, the numbers of lines (known as στιχοι / stichoi), and pictures (portraits of Matthew and Mark).

== Text ==
The Greek text of the codex is considered to be a representative of the Byzantine text-type. It was written by several different hands, with readings from other copies. Biblical scholar Kurt Aland did not place the Greek text of the codex in any Category of his New Testament manuscript classification system.

== History ==
The earliest history of the manuscript is unknown. It was examined for biblical scholar Andreas Birch in 1786. It was added to the list of New Testament manuscripts by textual critic Johann M. A. Scholz (1794–1852), as his number 237. Biblical scholar Caspar René Gregory saw the manuscript in 1886, and give it the number 420 in his list of New Testament manuscripts.

The manuscript is currently dated by the INTF to the 10th century. It is presently housed at the Library of the University of Messina (shelf number F. V. 18) in Messina, Sicily.

== See also ==
- Minuscule 421
- Minuscule 419
- List of New Testament minuscules
- Biblical manuscript
- Textual criticism
