= Minuscule 457 =

- New Testament manuscript
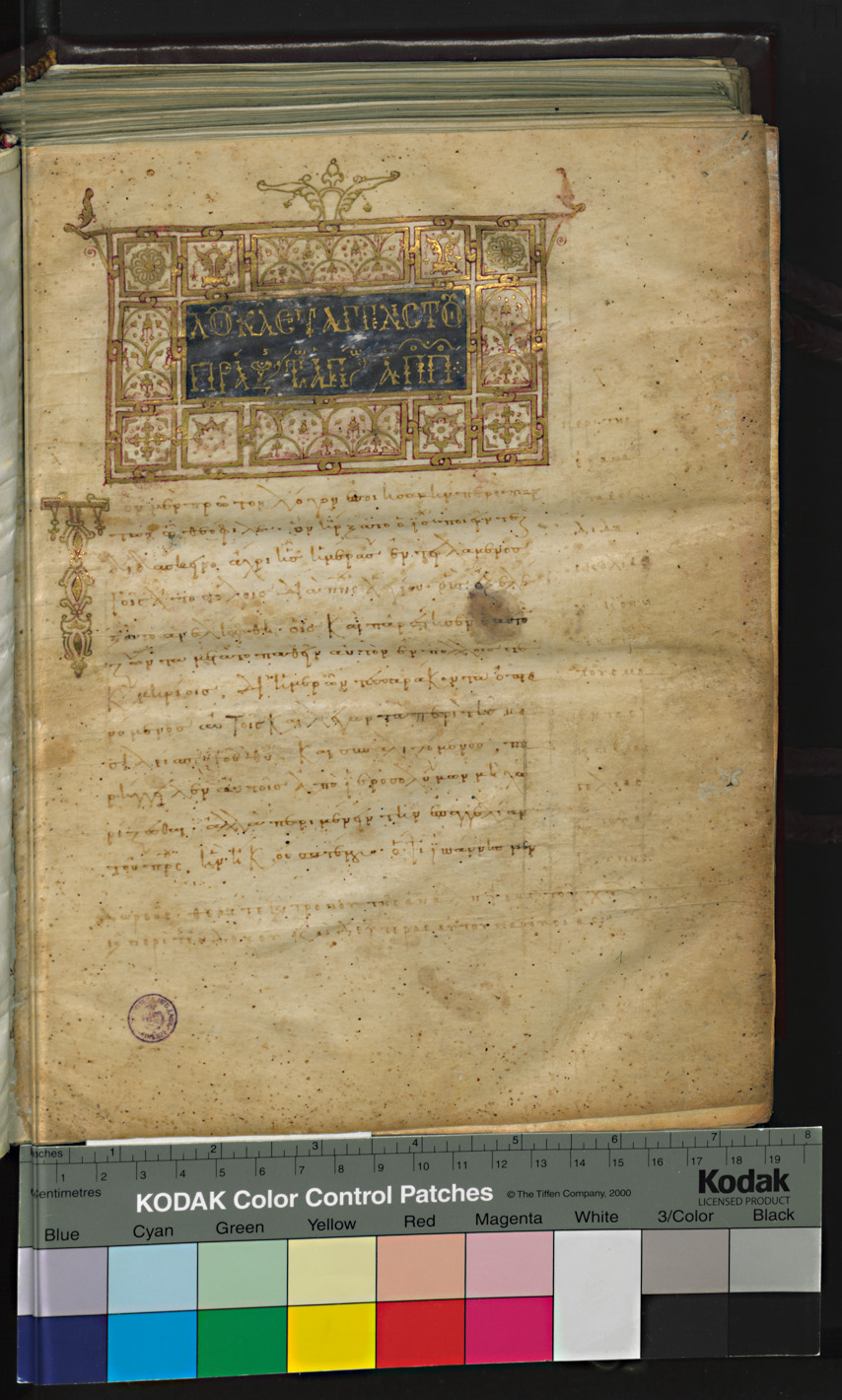
- Folio 1 recto
- Text: Acts of the Apostles, Catholic epistles, Pauline epistles
- Date: 10th century
- Script: Greek
- Now at: Laurentian Library
- Size: 26 cm by 19.5 cm
- Type: Byzantine
- Category: V
- Hand: beautifully written

Minuscule 457 (in the Gregory-Aland numbering), α 67 (in the Soden numbering), is a Greek minuscule manuscript of the New Testament, on parchment. Palaeographically It has been assigned to the 10th century. The manuscript has complex contents. Formerly it was labeled by 87^{a} and 97^{p}.

== Description ==
The codex contains the text of the Acts of the Apostles, Catholic epistles, and Pauline epistles on 294 parchment leaves (26 cm by 19.58 cm). It is written in one column per page, in 19 lines per page.

The text is divided according to the κεφαλαια (chapters), whose numbers are given at the margin, and their τιτλοι (titles) at the top of the pages.

It contains Prolegomena, tables of the κεφαλαια (tables of contents) before each book, subscriptions at the end of each book, with numbers of στιχοι, scholia, and modern interlinear Latin version in the Epistles.

The order of books: Acts of the Apostles, Catholic epistles, and Pauline epistles.

== Text ==
The Greek text of the codex is a representative of the Byzantine text-type. Aland placed it in Category V.

== History ==
The manuscript was examined and slightly collated by Birch and Scholz. Antonio Maria Biscioni published its facsimile in 1752.

Formerly it was labeled by 87^{a} and 97^{p}. C. R. Gregory saw it in 1886. In 1908 Gregory gave number 457 to it.

It is currently housed at the Laurentian Library (Plutei IV. 29) in Florence.

== See also ==
- List of New Testament minuscules
- Biblical manuscript
- Textual criticism
