= Minuscule 454 =

- New Testament manuscript
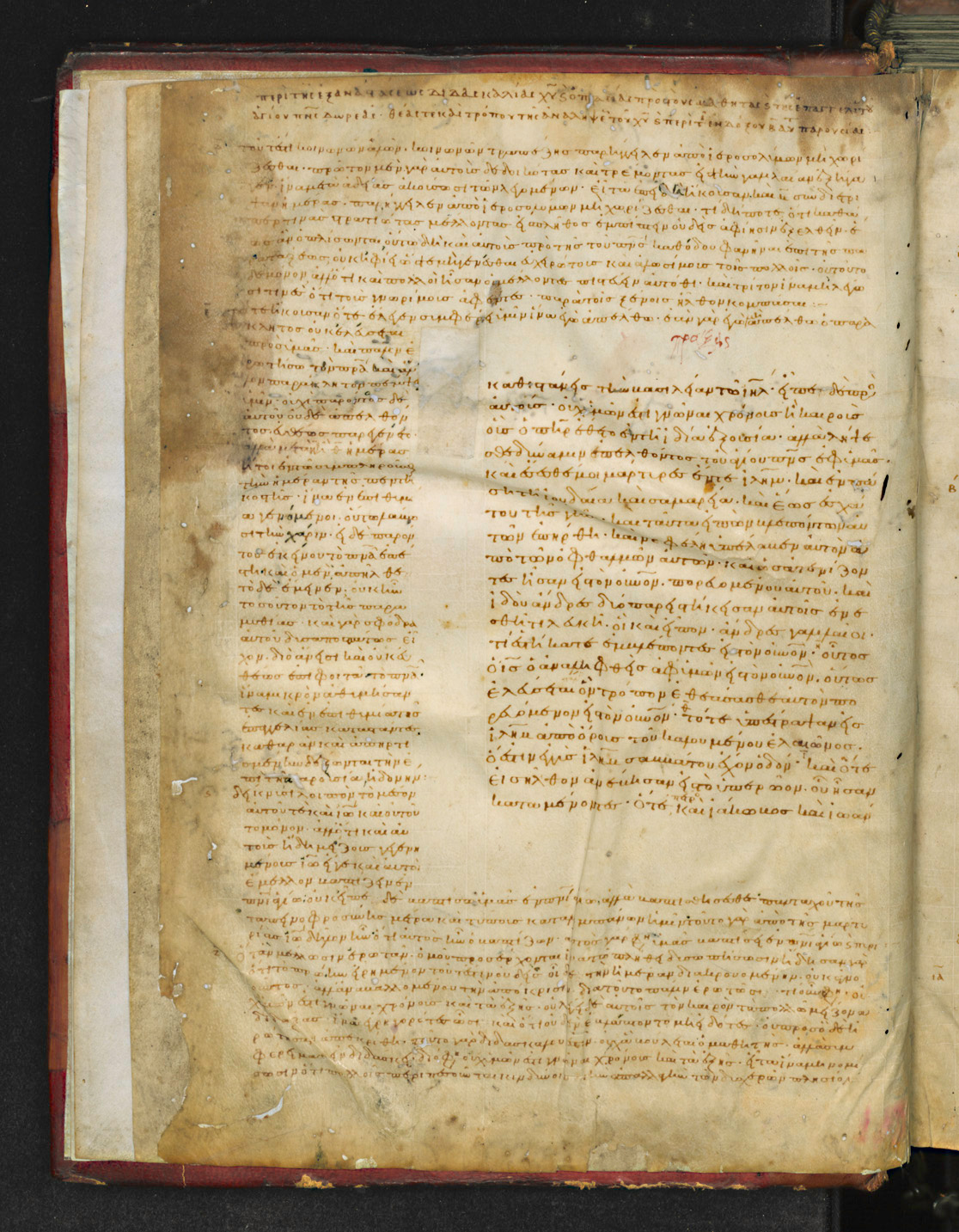
- Folio 1 verso
- Text: Acts of the Apostles, Catholic epistles, Pauline epistles
- Date: 10th century
- Script: Greek
- Now at: Laurentian Library
- Size: 33 cm by 25 cm
- Type: Byzantine
- Category: V

Minuscule 454 (in the Gregory-Aland numbering), Ο ^{8} (in the Soden numbering), is a Greek minuscule manuscript of the New Testament, on parchment. Palaeographically it has been assigned to the 10th century. Formerly it was labeled by 84^{a} and 94^{p}.

== Description ==
The codex contains the text of the Acts of the Apostles, Catholic epistles, and Pauline epistles on 244 parchment leaves (33 cm by 25 cm). It lacks Hebrews 13:21-25. The test is written in two columns per page, in 32 lines per page.

The text is divided according to the κεφαλαια (chapters), whose numbers are given at the margin, and their τιτλοι (titles) at the top of the pages.

It contains Prolegomena, tables of the κεφαλαια (tables of contents) before each book, subscriptions at the end of each book, with numbers of στιχοι, and a commentaries (Chrysostom's on the Acts, Nicetas on all the Epistles).

== Text ==
The Greek text of the codex is a representative of the Byzantine text-type. Aland placed it in Category V.

The order of books: Acts, Catholic epistles, and Pauline epistles (Hebrews placed before 1 Timothy).

== History ==
The manuscript was examined and slightly collated by Birch and Scholz. Antonio Maria Biscioni published its facsimile in 1752. C. R. Gregory saw it in 1886.

The manuscript was added to the list of the New Testament manuscripts by Scholz (1794-1852).

Formerly it was labeled by 84^{a} and 94^{p}. In 1908 Gregory gave the number 454 to it.

It is currently housed at the Laurentian Library (Plutei IV. 1) in Florence.

== See also ==
- List of New Testament minuscules
- Biblical manuscript
- Textual criticism
