= Minuscule 433 =

- New Testament manuscript
- Name: Berolinensis
- Text: Gospels †
- Date: 11th century
- Script: Greek
- Found: 1803, Wilhelm Ernst von Knobelsdorf
- Now at: Jagiellonian Library
- Size: 20.2 cm by 15 cm
- Type: mixed
- Category: none
- Hand: beautifully written
- Note: full marginalia many errors

Minuscule 433 (in the Gregory-Aland numbering), ε 181 (in the Soden numbering), is a Greek minuscule manuscript of the New Testament, on parchment. Palaeographically it has been assigned to the 11th century. The manuscript has survived in a fragmentary condition. The text is a mixture of several different textual traditions. The manuscript was prepared for church reading. It has full marginalia.

== Description ==
The codex contains the text of the four Gospels on 80 parchment leaves (20.2 cm by 15 cm) with large lacunae. The leaves of the codex are arranged into quarto (four leaves in quire). The text is written in one column per page, in 24 lines per page, in very small and beautiful letters.

The nomina sacra are written in an abbreviated way (θς for θεος, κς for κυριος, ις for ιησους, χς for χριστος, ανος for ανθρωπος, ιηλ for ισραηλ, σηρ for σωτηρ, ουνιος for ουρανιος, πνα for πνευμα, πηρ for πατηρ, μηρ for μητηρ, υς for υιος, ιω for ιωαννης, δαδ for δαυιδ), but not often. There are also other abbreviations used in the manuscript. The words at the end of the line sometimes are abbreviated. The error of itacism occurs, αι and ε, ε and η, η and υ, ει and ι, ι and η, ι and οι, ο and ω are confused frequently.

The text is divided according to the κεφαλαια (chapters), whose numbers are given at the margin, with their τιτλοι (titles) at the top of the pages. There is also another division according to the smaller Ammonian Sections, whose numbers are written at the margin with references to the Eusebian Canons (written below Ammonian Section numbers).

The tables of the κεφαλαια (tables of contents) are placed before each Gospel, lectionary markings are inserted at the margin (for the Church reading), and αναγνωσεις (lessons).

The Greek text of the codex is mixed with many errors in very minute letters.

Contents

Matthew 1:1-21; 6:12-32; 22:25-28:20; Mark 1:1-5:29; 9:21-18:12; Luke 7:27–John 9:21; 20:15-21:25.

== Text ==
The Greek text of the codex is a mixture of the text-types. According to G. G. Pappelbaum some of its textual variants are found in other manuscripts from the East, and some variants are typical for the Western manuscripts. It has also some rare readings, which are not supported by any textual family. Kurt Aland the Greek text of the codex did not place in any Category. It was not examined according to the Claremont Profile Method.

In Matthew 1:6 it reads Σολομωντα for Σολομωνα, as Minuscule 84.

It lacks the whole verse Matthew 23:14, as Sinaiticus, Vaticanus, Bezae, Regius, Dublinensis, Koridethi, f^{1}, 33, 892.

In Matthew 23:25 it reads ακρασιας for αδικιας.

In Matthew 24:29 it reads αστερες for αστεραις.

In Matthew 26:31 it has singular reading τα δωδεκα for τα προβατα.

In Matthew 26:52 it reads αποθανουνται for απολουνται.

In Matthew 27:34 it reads οινον for οξος, as B, D, K, L, 1, 33, 69, 73, Sinaiticus, Koridethi.

In Matthew 27:49 the whole verse was omitted by scribe (probably as error of homoioteleuton).

In Mark 1:9 it reads Ναζαρεθ for Ναζαρετ.

In Mark 1:16 it reads αμφιβαλλοντας for βαλλοντας.

In Mark 5:26 it reads παρα for υπο.

== History ==
F. H. A. Scrivener dated the manuscript to the 11th or 12th century, C. R. Gregory to the 11th century. It is dated by the Institute for New Testament Textual Research to the 11th century.

The manuscript was brought from the East to Berlin by Wilhelm Ernst von Knobelsdorff in 1803, along with many other manuscripts (Persian and Arabic). In 1820 it was presented for the Prussian State Library. G. G. Pappelbaum described and collated its text in 1824. The manuscript was added to the list of New Testament manuscripts by Scholz (1794–1852), who listed it under the number 239. C. R. Gregory saw it in 1887. Hermann von Soden designated it by siglum ε 181.

At the end of 1943 year has increased the frequency of the bombing of Berlin. The Prussian State Library sent many collections out of Berlin to be sheltered in Silesia for safekeeping. As the result of postwar border changes some of these collections were found in Poland (among minuscule 433). They were moved to the Jagiellonian University Library.

The manuscript used to be held in Berlin (MS Quart 12). It is now housed at the Biblioteka Jagiellońska (Fonds der Berliner Hss. Graec. qu. 12) in Kraków.

== See also ==
- List of New Testament minuscules
- Biblical manuscript
- Textual criticism
