= Minuscule 447 =

- New Testament manuscript
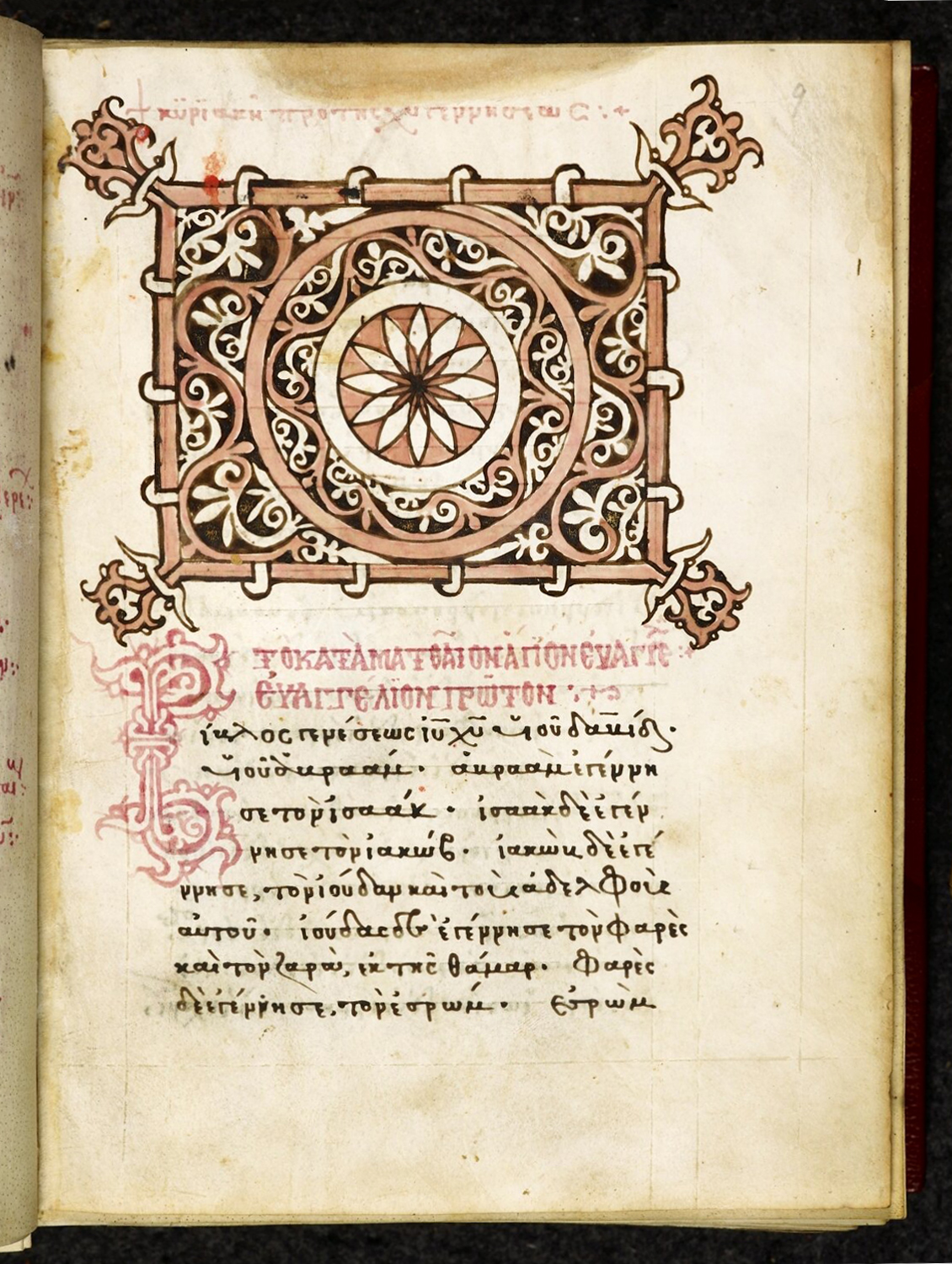
- Folio 9, beginning of the Gospel of Matthew
- Text: Gospels †
- Date: 15th century
- Script: Greek
- Now at: British Library
- Size: 19.6 cm by 14.7 cm
- Type: Byzantine text-type
- Category: none
- Hand: well written

Minuscule 447 (in the Gregory-Aland numbering), ε 508 (in the Soden numbering), is a Greek minuscule manuscript of the New Testament, on parchment. Palaeographically it has been assigned to the 15th century.

== Description ==
The codex contains a complete text of the four Gospels on 329 parchment leaves (19.6 cm by 14.7 cm). It is written in one column per page, in 25 lines per page. Three paper fly-leaves were added in modern time. The headpieces are decorated in red and black ink, or black and brown ink. The initial letters in red.

The text is divided according to the κεφαλαια (chapters), whose numerals are given at the margin, and the τιτλοι (titles of chapters) at the top of the pages. There is also a division according to the smaller Ammonian Sections (in Mark 240, 16:9), with references to the Eusebian Canons (written below Ammonian Section numbers).

It contains the Eusebian Canon tables (in red), prolegomena, lists of the κεφαλαια (tables of contents) before each Gospel, ornamentations, lectionary markings at the margin (for liturgical use), Synaxarion, Menologion, subscriptions at the end of each Gospel, στιχοι, prolegomena to Paul. It is well written.

== Text ==
The Greek text of the codex is a representative of the Byzantine text-type. Hermann von Soden classified it to the textual family K^{x}. Aland did not place it in any Category. According to the Claremont Profile Method it represents textual family Family K^{x} in Luke 1 and M27 in Luke 10 and Luke 20. It is close to 1014 in Luke 10 and Luke 20.

== History ==
The manuscript was written by Gerardos, a scribe. John Gibson, a dealer, sold it to Edward Harley on 13 February 1723/1724. In 1753 it was purchased along with other manuscripts of collection by the British Museum.

The manuscript was added to the list of New Testament manuscripts by Scholz (1794-1852). Scholz examined only Mark 5. C. R. Gregory saw it in 1883. The manuscript was rebound in 1965.

It is currently housed at the British Library (Harley MS 5784).

== See also ==
- List of New Testament minuscules
- Biblical manuscript
- Textual criticism
