= Minuscule 408 =

- New Testament manuscript
- Text: Gospels
- Date: 12th century
- Script: Greek
- Now at: Biblioteca Marciana
- Size: 23 cm by 20 cm
- Type: Byzantine text-type
- Category: V
- Note: marginalia

Minuscule 408 (in the Gregory-Aland numbering), ε 231 (in Soden's numbering), is a Greek minuscule manuscript of the New Testament, on parchment. Palaeographically it has been assigned to the 12th century. It has marginalia.

== Description ==
The codex contains a complete text of the four Gospels on 261 parchment leaves (23 cm by 20 cm). The text is written in one column per page, in 22 lines per page. Text of Matthew 1:1-13 was added by a later hand.

The text is divided according to the κεφαλαια (chapters), whose numbers are given at the margin, and their τιτλοι (titles) at the top of the pages. There is also a division according to the smaller Ammonian Sections (in Mark 234 Sections), whose numbers are given at the margin with references to the Eusebian Canons (written below Ammonian Section numbers).

It contains the Epistula ad Carpianum, the Eusebian Canon tables at the beginning, tables of the κεφαλαια (tables of contents) before each Gospel, subscriptions at the end of each Gospel, numbers of stichoi, and pictures. Synaxarion and Menologion were added on paper.

== Text ==
The Greek text of the codex is a representative of the Byzantine text-type. Hermann von Soden classified it to the textual family K^{1}. Aland placed it in Category V.

According to the Claremont Profile Method it represents textual family K^{x} in Luke 1, Luke 10, and Luke 20.

== History ==
Formerly the manuscript was held in the Chrysostomus monastery, near Jordan, as stated in a note of the original scribe. Wiedmann and J. G. J. Braun collated portions of the manuscript for Scholz (1794–1852). The manuscript was added to the list of New Testament manuscripts by Scholz. C. R. Gregory saw it in 1886.

The manuscript is currently housed at the Biblioteca Marciana (Gr. I. 14) in Venice.

== See also ==
- List of New Testament minuscules
- Biblical manuscript
- Textual criticism
