= Minuscule 455 =

Greek manuscript of the New Testament

- New Testament manuscript
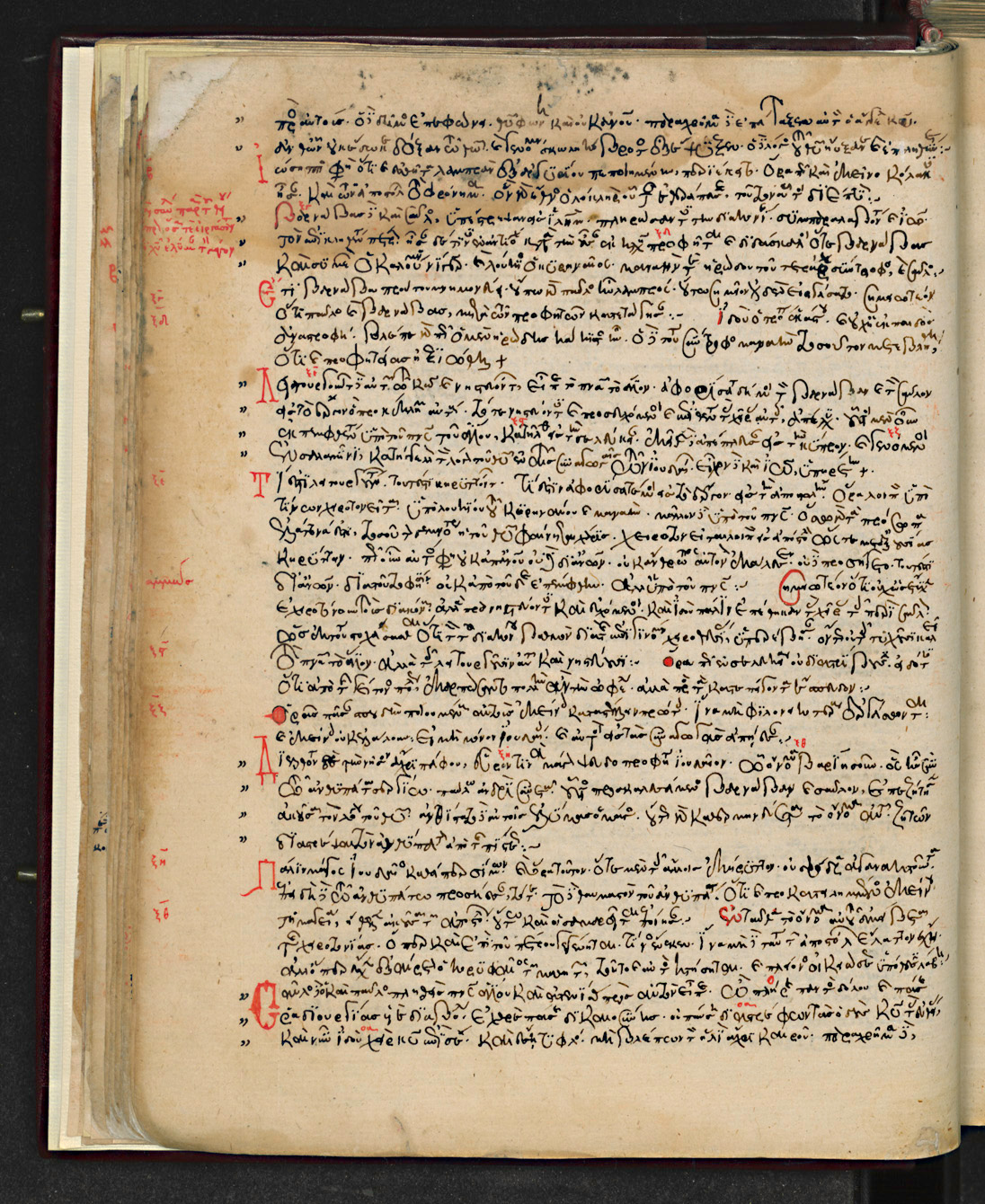
- folio 20 verso
- Text: Acts of the Apostles, Pauline epistles
- Date: 13th/14th century
- Script: Greek
- Now at: Laurentian Library
- Size: 31.1 cm by 25.2 cm
- Category: none

Minuscule 455 (in the Gregory-Aland numbering), ΟΘ ^{41} (in the Soden numbering), is a Greek minuscule manuscript of the New Testament, on paper. Palaeographically it has been assigned to the 13th or 14th century. Formerly it was labelled by 85^{a} and 95^{p}.

== Description ==
The codex contains the text of the Acts of the Apostles and Pauline epistles on 285 paper leaves (31.1 cm by 25.2 cm). It is written in one column per page, in 31-45 lines per page. The letters are written above lines. It contains Prolegomena, Synaxarion (liturgical book with hagiographies), and commentaries of Theophylact.

The order of books: Acts, Romans, Hebrews, Colossians, 1-2 Thessalonians, Titus, 1-2 Corinthians, 1-2 Timothy, Ephesians, Philippians, Galatians, and Philemon.

Kurt Aland the Greek text of the codex did not place in any Category.

== History ==
The manuscript was examined by Birch, Scholz, and C. R. Gregory (1886). It was slightly collated by Scholz.

Formerly it was labelled by 85^{a} and 95^{p}. In 1908 Gregory gave the number 455 to it.

It is currently housed at the Laurentian Library (Plutei IV. 5) in Florence.

== See also ==
- List of New Testament minuscules
- Biblical manuscript
- Textual criticism
