= Minuscule 487 =

- New Testament manuscript
- Text: Gospels
- Date: 11th-century
- Script: Greek
- Now at: Jerusalem
- Size: 20.8 cm by 14.5 cm
- Type: Byzantine text-type
- Category: none

Minuscule 487 (in the Gregory-Aland numbering), ε 363 (in the Soden numbering), is a Greek minuscule manuscript of the New Testament, on parchment. Palaeographically it has been assigned to the 11th century. Scrivener labeled it by number 516 on his list. Gregory labeled it twice as 487 and by another number 1321. The manuscript has complex contents.

== Description ==
The codex contains a complete text of the four Gospels on 218 parchment leaves (20.8 cm by 14.5 cm). The text is written in one column per page, 18 lines per page (size of text 11.5 cm by 9.5 cm).

It contains the Eusebian tables, tables of the κεφαλαια (tables of contents) before each Gospel, liturgical books with hagiographies (Synaxarion and Menologion), and pictures

It has errors of itacism and N ephelkystikon.

== Text ==
The Greek text of the codex is a mixture of text-types with predominant the Byzantine element. Aland did not place it in any Category. It was not examined by Claremont Profile Method.

== History ==
The manuscript once belonged to the collection of J. D. Carlyle († 1804), then to the Lambeth Palace (1255, No. 25). G. Bennet made a collation of Matthew and Mark it is held in the Lambeth Palace (1255, No. 25). In 1817 it returned to the Patriarch of Jerusalem.

The manuscript was added to the list of New Testament manuscripts by Scrivener, who it examined and collated. Scrivener published its text in 1852.

It is currently housed at the Library of Patriarch (49) in Jerusalem.

== See also ==
- List of New Testament minuscules
- Biblical manuscript
- Textual criticism
