= Minuscule 435 =

- New Testament manuscript
- Name: Gronovii
- Text: Gospels †
- Date: 12th/13th century
- Script: Greek
- Now at: Leiden University Library
- Size: 25 cm by 15.5 cm
- Type: Byzantine
- Category: none
- Note: unusual readings

Minuscule 435 (in the Gregory-Aland numbering), ε 1031 (in the Soden numbering), is a Greek minuscule manuscript of the New Testament, on parchment. Palaeographically it has been assigned to the 12th or 13th century. The marginalia are almost complete.

== Description ==
The codex contains the text of the four Gospels on 286 parchment leaves (size 25 cm by 15.5 cm) with some lacunae (Matthew 1:20-2:13; 22:4-19; John 10:14-21:25). The text is written in one column per page, in 24-26 lines per page.

The text is divided according to the κεφαλαια (chapters), whose numbers are given at the margin, and their τιτλοι (titles) at the top of the pages. There is also a division according to the smaller Ammonian Sections, without references to the Eusebian Canons.

It contains some pictures, lectionary markings at the margin (for liturgical use) and αναγνωσεις (lessons) were added at the margin by a later hand. The text of John 10:14-21:25 was added by a later hand.

== Text ==
The Greek text of the codex is mixed with a predominant element of the Byzantine text-type. Hermann von Soden classified it to the textual family I^{κ}. Kurt Aland did not place the Greek text of the codex in any Category.

Scrivener stayed: "It has somewhat unusual text".

According to the Claremont Profile Method it represents K^{x} in Luke 1; 10; 20. It belongs also to the textual cluster 1053.

== History ==
Scrivener and Gregory dated the manuscript to the 10th century. Currently it is dated by the INTF to the 12th or 13th century.

The manuscript was added to the list of New Testament manuscripts by Scholz (1794-1852). It was examined by Jac. Dermout. C. R. Gregory saw it in 1891.

285 leaves of the codex are currently housed at the Leiden University Library (Gronovii 137) in Leiden.

The codex is cited in critical editions of the Greek New Testament (NA26).

1 leaf of the codex (Matthew 22:4-19) was classified as minuscule 576 (Gregory-Aland), before it was identified as a part of the same codex as minuscule 435. Currently it is housed at the Arundel Castle and belongs to the Duke of Norfolk (M.D. 459).

== See also ==
- List of New Testament minuscules
- Biblical manuscript
- Textual criticism
