= Minuscule 576 =

- New Testament manuscript
- Text: Gospel of Matthew (22:4-19)
- Date: 11th century
- Script: Greek
- Now at: Arundel Castle
- Size: 25 cm by 15.5 cm
- Type: Byzantine
- Category: none
- Note: unusual readings

Minuscule 576 (in the Gregory-Aland numbering), ε 1318 (in the Soden numbering), is a Greek minuscule manuscript of the New Testament, on parchment. Palaeographically it has been assigned to the 11th century. The manuscript is lacunose.

== Description ==
The codex contains only the text of the Gospel of Matthew (22:4-19) on 1 parchment leaves (size 25 cm by 15.5 cm). The text is written in one column per page, in 26 lines per page.

The text is divided according to the κεφαλαια (chapters), whose numerals are given at the margin (chapters), and their τιτλοι (titles) at the top of the pages. There is also a division according to the smaller Ammonian Sections (no references to the Eusebian Canons).

It contains Lectionary markings and αναγνωσεις (lessons) were added by a later hand.

== Text ==
The Greek text of the codex is mixed with a predominate element of the Byzantine text-type. The Greek text of the codex was not placed by Aland in any Category.

According to Hermann von Soden its text is close to the textual families Π^{a} and Π^{b}.

== History ==
The manuscript was added to the list of New Testament manuscripts by Gregory.

The manuscript belonged to the same codex as manuscript 435, housed at the Leiden University Library (Gronov. 137) in Leiden, but it was classified as minuscule 576 (Gregory-Aland) before identification with the codex 435.

Currently it is housed at the Arundel Castle and belongs to the Duke of Norfolk (M.D. 459).

== See also ==
- List of New Testament minuscules
- Biblical manuscript
- Textual criticism
