= Minuscule 438 =

- New Testament manuscript
- Text: Gospels
- Date: 12th century
- Script: Greek
- Now at: British Library
- Size: 25.7 cm by 18 cm
- Type: Byzantine text-type
- Category: V

Minuscule 438 (in the Gregory-Aland numbering), ε 241 (in the Soden numbering), is a Greek minuscule manuscript of the New Testament, on parchment. Palaeographically it has been assigned to the 12th century.

== Description ==
The codex contains a complete text of the four Gospels on 452 parchment leaves (25.7 cm by 18 cm) with only one lacunae (Matthew 1:6-15). The leaves of the manuscript were split in two volumes (211 + 241 leaves). The text is written in one column per page, in 18 lines per page. The manuscript is written in a typical medieval Greek minuscule script, characterized by smaller, cursive letterforms that became standard for copying texts after the 9th century, replacing the earlier uncial majuscule scripts.

The text is divided according to the κεφαλαια (chapters), whose numbers are given at the margin, and their τιτλοι (titles) at the top of the pages. There is also a division according to the Ammonian Sections (in Mark 234, 16:9), with references to the Eusebian Canons (not subscribed).

It contains the Epistula ad Carpianum, Eusebian Canon tables, tables of the κεφαλαια (tables of contents) before each Gospel, subscriptions at the end of each Gospel, and pictures of Evangelists.

== Text ==
The Greek text of the codex is a representative of the Byzantine text-type. Hermann von Soden classified it to the textual family K^{1}. Aland placed it in Category V.

According to the Claremont Profile Method it represents the textual family K^{x} in Luke 1 and Luke 20. In Luke 10 no profile was made.

== History ==
The manuscript was written by Gregory, a monk who died in 1189. It once belonged to Anthony Askew (1722–1774) (as codices 439 and 443). It was examined by Bloomfield. The manuscript was added to the list of New Testament manuscripts by Scholz (1794–1852). C. R. Gregory saw it in 1883.

It is currently housed at the British Library (Add MSS 5111-5112) in London.

== See also ==
- List of New Testament minuscules
- Biblical manuscript
- Textual criticism
