= Minuscule 486 =

- New Testament manuscript
- Text: Gospel of John
- Date: 15th-century
- Script: Greek
- Now at: Lambeth Palace
- Size: 21.7 cm by 14.8 cm
- Type: mixed
- Category: none
- Hand: neatly written

Minuscule 486 (in the Gregory-Aland numbering), ε 510 (in the Soden numbering), is a Greek minuscule manuscript of the New Testament, on paper. Palaeographically it has been assigned to the 15th-century. Scrivener labeled it by number 517. The manuscript has complex contents.

== Description ==
The codex contains the text of the Gospel of John on 51 paper leaves (size 21.7 cm by 14.8 cm). The text is written in one column per page, 21 lines per page. It contains prolegomena, numbers of the κεφαλαια (chapters) at the margin, and a few rubrical directions, but no other liturgical apparatus. It is neatly but carelessly written on oriental paper.

This copy abounds with omissions in consequence of clauses having the same beginning or end, and many words are written in error twice over; most of which instances of gross carelessness are corrected by a later hand. There is no "ι subscriptum", "ι ascriptum" occurs twice at John 3:36 and is erased even there. Scrivener found only one example of ν εφελκυστικον in John 6:61 (erased). The breathing and accent marks are pretty correct. Errors of itacism are not very frequent (about two or three in chapter).

It has few peculiarities of spelling, e.g. ταυθα (2:6), βαραβας (18:40), ηλθα (8:14), τεθηκαν (19:42), and καιαφα (18:24).

== Text ==
The Greek text of the codex is a mixture of text-types. Aland did not place it in any Category.

== History ==
The manuscript has a written inscription "T. Wagstaffe ex dono D. Barthol. Cassano e sacerdotibus ecclesiae Graecae, Oct. 20, 1732".

The manuscript was added to the list of New Testament manuscripts by Scrivener, who thoroughly examined and collated it. Scrivener published the collation in 1852.

It is currently housed at the Lambeth Palace (1350) in London.

== See also ==
- List of New Testament minuscules
- Biblical manuscript
- Textual criticism
