= Minuscule 465 =

- New Testament manuscript
- Text: Acts, Cath., Pauline epistles
- Date: 11th century
- Script: Greek
- Now at: Bibliothèque nationale de France
- Size: 29.7 cm by 22.3 cm
- Type: Byzantine text-type
- Category: V

Minuscule 465 (in the Gregory-Aland numbering), α 166 (in the Soden numbering), is a Greek minuscule manuscript of the New Testament, on parchment. Palaeographically it has been assigned to the 11th century. The manuscript has complex contents. Formerly it was labeled by 114^{a} and 134^{p}. It has liturgical books.

== Description ==
The codex contains the text of the Acts of the Apostles, Catholic epistles, and Pauline epistles on 231 parchment leaves (29.7 cm by 22.3 cm). The text is written in two columns per page, 24 lines per page.

It contains numbers of the κεφαλαια (chapters) at the margin, the τιτλοι (titles) at the top of the pages, lectionary markings at the margin for liturgical use; liturgical books with hagiographies: Synaxarion and Menologion; subscriptions at the end of each book, numbers of στιχοι, and scholia.

The order of books: Acts of the Apostles, Catholic epistles, and Pauline epistles. It contains some portions of Septuagint (Book of Wisdom, Song of Songs, and Book of Proverbs 1:1-28:8) and prayers for the service of the Greek Church. According to Scrivener it is a valuable manuscript.

== Text ==
The Greek text of the codex is a representative of the Byzantine text-type. Aland placed it in Category V. According to Gregory it has unusual readings.

== History ==
The manuscript was slightly examined and described by Scholz, Paulin Martin, and C. R. Gregory (1885). According to Scholz, it was formerly indexed in the National Library as Gr. 2247. Isaac Newton cites it by that call number in his discussion of the Johannine Comma. It was examined by J.G. Reiche.

It was added to the list of New Testament manuscripts by Scholz. Formerly it was labeled by 114^{a} and 134^{p}. In 1908 Gregory gave the number 465 to it.

It is currently housed at the Bibliothèque nationale de France (Gr. 57) in Paris.

== See also ==
- List of New Testament minuscules
- Biblical manuscript
- Textual criticism
