= Minuscule 497 =

- New Testament manuscript
- Text: Gospels
- Date: 11th-century
- Script: Greek
- Now at: British Library
- Size: 15.7 cm by 12.3 cm
- Type: Byzantine text-type
- Category: V
- Hand: very small hand

Minuscule 497 (in the Gregory-Aland numbering), ε 1125 (in the Soden numbering), is a Greek minuscule manuscript of the New Testament, on parchment. Palaeographically it has been assigned to the 11th-century. Scrivener labelled it by number 583. The manuscript has marginalia. It has survived in complete condition.

== Description ==
The codex contains the complete text of the four Gospels on 184 parchment leaves (size 15.7 cm by 12.3 cm). The text is written in one column per page, 22-23 lines per page, in very small hand.

The text is divided according to the κεφαλαια (chapters), whose numbers are given at the margin, and the τιτλοι (titles of chapters) at the top of the pages. There is also a division according to the Ammonian Sections, with references to the Eusebian Canons.

It contains the Epistula ad Carpianum, Eusebian tables, prolegomena, subscriptions at the end of each Gospel, and pictures (portrait of John, the Evangelist, and Prochorus, his scribe).

== Text ==
The Greek text of the codex is a representative of the Byzantine text-type. Aland placed it in Category V. According to the Claremont Profile Method it belongs to the textual family K^{x} in Luke 1 and Luke 20. In Luke 10 no profile was made.

== History ==
It is dated by the INTF to the 11th-century.

The manuscript was added to the list of New Testament manuscripts by Scrivener (583) and C. R. Gregory (497). It was examined by Scrivener and Bloomfield.

It is currently housed at the British Library (Add MS 16943) in London.

== See also ==
- List of New Testament minuscules
- Biblical manuscript
- Textual criticism
