= Minuscule 252 =

- New Testament manuscript
- Name: Codex Dresdensis
- Text: Gospels
- Date: 11th century
- Script: Greek
- Now at: Moscow
- Size: 22.5 cm by 16.8 cm
- Category: none
- Note: full marginalia

Minuscule 252 (in the Gregory-Aland numbering), ε 438 (Soden), is a Greek minuscule manuscript of the New Testament, on parchment. Paleographically it has been assigned to the 11th century. It contains full marginalia.

== Description ==
The codex contains the text of the four Gospels on 123 parchment leaves (22.5 cm by 16.8 cm). The text is written in 1 column per page, 33 lines per page.

The text is divided according to the κεφαλαια (chapters), whose numbers are given at the margin, and their τιτλοι (titles of chapters) at the top of the pages. There is also a division according to the smaller Ammonian Sections, with references to the Eusebian Canons (written below Ammonian Section numbers).

It contains tables of the κεφαλαια (tables of contents) before each Gospel, lectionary markings at the margin, αναγνωσεις (lessons), corrections and double readings from another copy, made by prima manu.

Formerly it belonged to the same codex as 464 (Acts and Epistles).

== Text ==
The Greek text of the codex Kurt Aland did not place in any Category. It was not examined by using the Claremont Profile Method.

== History ==
Formerly the manuscript was held at the monastery at Athos peninsula. It was brought to Moscow, by the monk Arsenius, on the suggestion of the Patriarch Nikon, in the reign of Alexei Mikhailovich Romanov (1645-1676). The manuscript was collated by C. F. Matthaei. It was bought for Dresdener Bibliothek in 1788. After World War II it was brought to Moscow again.

It was examined by Matthaei, Tregelles, and Gebhardt. C. R. Gregory saw the manuscript in 1880.

The manuscript was housed at the Saxon State Library (A 145) at Dresden.

Currently the manuscript is housed at Moscow (Staatsarchiv, F. 1607, No. 5).

== See also ==
- List of New Testament minuscules
- Biblical manuscript
- Textual criticism
