= Minuscule 439 =

- New Testament manuscript
- Text: Gospels
- Date: 1159
- Script: Greek
- Now at: British Library
- Size: 31.7 cm by 24.5 cm
- Type: Byzantine text-type
- Category: V

Minuscule 439 is a Greek minuscule manuscript of the New Testament Gospels, written on parchment. It is designated by the siglum 439 in the Gregory-Aland numbering of New Testament manuscripts, and ε 240 in the von Soden numbering of New Testament manuscripts. A colophone dates it to the year 1159. The manuscript has full marginal notes.

== Description ==
The manuscript is a codex (precursor to the modern book format), containing the complete text of the New Testament Gospels, made of 219 parchment leaves (sized 31.7 cm by 24.5 cm). The text is written in two columns per page, with 23 lines per page.

The text is divided according to the chapters (known as κεφαλαια / kephalaia), whose numbers are given in the margin, and their titles (known as τιτλοι / titloi) written at the top of the pages. There is also a division according to the smaller Ammonian Sections, with references to the Eusebian Canons written below the Ammonian section numbers (both early divisions of the Gospels into sections.).

It contains the Epistle to Carpian, Eusebian Canon tables, with the tables of contents (also known as κεφαλαια / kephalaia) before each Gospel, pictures (portraits of Evangelists), and subscriptions at the end of each Gospel.

== Text ==
The Greek text is considered to be a representative of the Byzantine text-type. Biblical scholar Kurt Aland placed it in Category V of his New Testament manuscript classification system. Category V manuscripts are described as "manuscripts with a purely or predominantly Byzantine text." Textual critic Hermann von Soden classified it to the textual family K^{x}.

According to the Claremont Profile Method (a specific analysis of textual data), it represents textual family K^{x} in Luke 1 and Luke 20, and belongs to the textual cluster 877. In Luke 10 no profile was made.

== History ==
The manuscript was written by a monk named Nephon from Mount Athos in April, 1159. It once belonged to Anthony Askew (1722–1774), along with codices Minuscule 438 and 443. It was examined by scholar Samuel T. Bloomfield. The manuscript was added to the list of New Testament manuscripts by Johann M. A. Scholz (1794–1852).

Biblical scholar Caspar René Gregory saw it in 1883. It is currently housed at the British Library in London (shelf number Add MS 5107) .

== See also ==
- List of New Testament minuscules
- Biblical manuscript
- Textual criticism
