= Minuscule 443 =

- New Testament manuscript
- Text: Gospels
- Date: 12th century
- Script: Greek
- Now at: Cambridge University Library
- Size: 28 cm by 21.5 cm
- Type: Byzantine text-type
- Category: V
- Note: marginalia

Minuscule 443 (in the Gregory-Aland numbering), ε 270 (in the Soden numbering), is a Greek minuscule manuscript of the New Testament, on parchment. Palaeographically it has been assigned to the 12th century. It has marginalia.

== Description ==
The codex contains a complete text of the four Gospels on 235 parchment leaves (28 cm by 21.5 cm). The text is written in two columns per page, in 24 lines per page. The columns have size only 17.3 by 5.5 cm.

The text is divided according to the κεφαλαια (chapters), whose numbers are given at the margin, and their τιτλοι at the top of the pages. There is also a division according to the smaller Ammonian Sections, with references to the Eusebian Canons (written below Ammonian Section numbers).

It contains the Epistula ad Carpianum, the Eusebian Canon tables, prolegomena, lists of the κεφαλαια (tables of contents) are placed before each Gospel, Synaxarion, Menologion, and subscriptions at the end of each Gospel.

== Text ==
The Greek text of the codex is a representative of the Byzantine text-type. Aland placed it in Category V. According to the Claremont Profile Method it belongs to the textual cluster M159 in Luke 1, Luke 10, and Luke 20.

The Pericope Adulterae (John 7:53-8:11) is marked with an obelus.

== History ==
The manuscript is dated by the INTF to the 12th century.

The manuscript once belonged to Anthony Askew (1722–1774) (as codices 438 and 439). It was bought for the University Library in 1775 for £20, at the celebrated book-sale of Anthony Askew. The manuscript was added to the list of New Testament manuscripts by Scholz (1794–1852). C. R. Gregory saw it in 1886.

It is currently housed at the Cambridge University Library (Nn. 2.36) in Cambridge.

== See also ==
- List of New Testament minuscules
- Biblical manuscript
- Textual criticism
