= Minuscule 464 =

Minuscule 464 + 252
- New Testament manuscript
- Text: Acts, Cath., Pauline epistles
- Date: 11th century
- Script: Greek
- Now at: State Historical Museum
- Size: 22.5 cm by 16.8 cm
- Category: none
- Hand: carefully written

Minuscule 464 (in the Gregory-Aland numbering), α 165 (in the Soden numbering), is a Greek minuscule manuscript of the New Testament, on parchment. Palaeographically it has been assigned to the 11th century. Formerly it was labelled by 106^{a} and 122^{p}. Minuscule 464 has been identified as the same manuscript as Minuscule 252.

== Description ==
The codex contains the text of the Acts of the Apostles, Catholic epistles, and Pauline epistles on 229 parchment leaves (22.5 cm by 16.8 cm). It contains also liturgical books with hagiographies: Synaxarion, Menologion.

It is carefully written in one column per page, 33 lines per page.

It contains prolegomena, tables of the κεφαλαια (tables of contents) before each sacred book, lectionary markings at the margin (for liturgical reading), and the Psalms annexed.

The order of books is usual for the Greek manuscripts: Acts, Catholic epistles, and Pauline epistles.

Kurt Aland the Greek text of the codex did not place in any Category.

== History ==
Formerly it belonged to the same manuscript as codex 252 (Gospels).

The manuscript came from the Vatopedi monastery at Mount Athos to Moscow.

Formerly it was labelled by 106^{a} and 122^{p}. In 1908 C. R. Gregory gave the number 464 to it.

The manuscript was examined by Matthaei and Treu. It is currently housed at the State Historical Museum (S. 328) in Moscow.

== See also ==
- List of New Testament minuscules
- Biblical manuscript
- Textual criticism
- Minuscule 463
