= Minuscule 452 =

- New Testament manuscript
- Name: Pius II
- Text: New Testament (except Gospels)
- Date: 12th century
- Script: Greek
- Now at: Vatican Library
- Size: 16.8 cm by 13 cm
- Type: Byzantine
- Category: V

Minuscule 452 (in the Gregory-Aland numbering), α 206 (in the Soden numbering), is a Greek minuscule manuscript of the New Testament, on parchment. Palaeographically it has been assigned to the 12th century. Formerly it was labelled by 80^{a}, 91^{p} and 42^{r}.

== Description ==
The codex contains the text of the New Testament except Gospels on 327 parchment leaves (16.8 cm by 13 cm). The text is written in one column per page, in 21-22 lines per page. The letters are written above lines.

The text is divided according to the κεφαλαια (chapters), whose numbers are given at the margin, and their τιτλοι (titles) at the top of the pages.

It contains Prolegomena, the tables of the κεφαλαια (tables of contents) before each book, subscriptions at the end of each book, numbers of στιχοι, and the Euthalian Apparatus.

The order of books: Book of Acts, Catholic epistles, Pauline epistles (Hebrews before 1 Timothy), and Book of Revelation.

== Text ==
The Greek text of the codex is a representative of the Byzantine text-type. Aland placed it in Category V.

== History ==
Scrivener and Gregory dated the manuscript to the 12th century. Henry Stevenson to the 10th century. Currently the INTF dated it to the 12th century.

The manuscript was held in the Library of St. Silvester at the time of Pope Pius II. It was deposited to the Vatican Library in time of Pope Clement XI.

The manuscript was added to the list of the New Testament manuscripts by Scholz (1794-1852). Formerly it was labelled by 80^{a}, 91^{p} and 42^{r}. In 1908 Gregory gave the number 452 to it.

The manuscript was examined by Birch, Scholz, Duchesne, Stevenson, and C. R. Gregory (1886). It was slightly collated by Scholz. Hoskier collated the text of the Apocalypse.

It is currently housed at the Vatican Library (Reg. gr. Pii II 50) in Rome.

== See also ==
- List of New Testament minuscules
- Biblical manuscript
- Textual criticism
