= Minuscule 437 =

- New Testament manuscript
- Text: Acts of the Apostles
- Date: 11th century
- Script: Greek
- Now at: Vatican Library
- Size: 25.8 cm by 21 cm
- Category: none

Minuscule 437 (in the Gregory-Aland numbering), Α^{πρ12} (in the Soden numbering), is a Greek minuscule manuscript of the New Testament, on parchment. Palaeographically it has been assigned to the 11th century.

== Description ==
The codex contains only the text of the Acts of the Apostles on 257 parchment leaves (25.8 cm by 21 cm) with a catena. The text is written in one column per page, in 24 lines per page.

== Text ==
Aland did not place the Greek text of the codex in any Category.

== History ==
Scrivener dated the manuscript to the 12th century, Gregory dated it to the 11th century.

The manuscript was added to the list of the New Testament manuscripts by Scholz (1794-1852).

The manuscript was examined by Birch and Scholz. It was designated by 74^{a}. C. R. Gregory saw it in 1886.

It is currently housed at the Vatican Library (Vat. gr. 760) in Rome.

== See also ==
- List of New Testament minuscules
- Biblical manuscript
- Textual criticism
