= Minuscule 409 =

- New Testament manuscript
- Text: Gospels
- Date: 14th century
- Script: Greek
- Now at: Biblioteca Marciana
- Size: 21 x 14.6
- Type: Byzantine text-type
- Category: V
- Note: marginalia

Minuscule 409 (in the Gregory-Aland numbering), ε 424 (in Soden's numbering), is a Greek minuscule manuscript of the New Testament, on parchment. Palaeographically it has been assigned to the 14th century. It has marginalia.

== Description ==
The codex contains a complete text of the four Gospels on 210 parchment leaves (21 cm by 14.6 cm). The text is written in one column per page, in 29 lines per page. The writing is very rough, the stops being mostly red crosses.

The text is divided according to the κεφαλαια (chapters), whose numbers are given at the margin, with their τιτλοι (titles) at the top of the pages. There is also a division according to the Ammonian Sections (in Mark 234 Sections, the last section in 16:9), but references to the Eusebian Canons are absent.

It contains the Epistula ad Carpianum, the Eusebian Canon tables, and Prolegomena at the beginning, the tables of the κεφαλαια (tables of contents) are placed before each Gospel, the Synaxarion, Menologion, subscriptions at the end of each Gospel, with numbers of stichoi.

== Text ==
The Greek text of the codex is a representative of the Byzantine text-type. Hermann von Soden classified it to the textual family K^{x}. Aland placed it in Category V. According to the Claremont Profile Method it represents textual family K^{x} in Luke 1 and Luke 20. In Luke 10 no profile was made.

The text contains many errors and rare readings.

== History ==
Wiedmann and J. G. J. Braun collated portions of the manuscript for Scholz (1794-1852). The manuscript was added to the list of New Testament manuscripts by Scholz. C. R. Gregory saw it in 1886.

The manuscript is currently housed at the Biblioteca Marciana (Gr. I. 15) in Venice.

== See also ==
- List of New Testament minuscules
- Biblical manuscript
- Textual criticism
