= Minuscule 411 =

Greek minuscule manuscript of the New Testament

- New Testament manuscript
- Name: Nanianus 11
- Text: Gospels
- Date: 10th century
- Script: Greek
- Now at: Biblioteca Marciana
- Size: 16.5 cm by 12 cm
- Type: Byzantine text-type
- Category: V
- Hand: beautifully written
- Note: marginalia

Minuscule 411 (in the Gregory-Aland numbering), ε 1013 (in Soden's numbering), is a Greek minuscule manuscript of the New Testament, on parchment. Palaeographically it has been assigned to the 10th century. It has been marginalia.

== Description ==
The codex contains a complete text of the four Gospels on 375 parchment leaves (16.5 cm by 12 cm). The text is written in one column per page, in 20 lines per page. It is very beautifully written in upright characters.

The text is divided according to the κεφαλαια (chapters), whose numbers are given at the margin, and their τιτλοι (titles) at the top of the pages. There is also a division according to the Ammonian Sections (in Mark 233 Sections, the last in 16:8), with references to the Eusebian Canons (written below Ammonian Section numbers).

It contains the Epistula ad Carpianum, Eusebian Canon tables, Prolegomena, matter of Cosmas, tables of the κεφαλαια (tables of contents) before each Gospel, Synaxarion, Menologion, and pictures. The manuscript has survived in a good condition.

== Text ==
The Greek text of the codex is a representative of the Byzantine text-type. Hermann von Soden classified it to the textual family K^{x}. Aland placed it in Category V. According to the Claremont Profile Method it represents textual family K^{x} in Luke 10 and Luke 20. In Luke 1 it has a mixture of the Byzantine families.

== History ==
The manuscript was written by Philip, a monk.

Wiedmann and J. G. J. Braun collated some portions of the manuscript for Scholz (1794-1852). The manuscript was added to the list of New Testament manuscripts by Scholz. C. R. Gregory saw it in 1886.

The manuscript is currently housed at the Biblioteca Marciana (Gr. I. 18) in Venice.

== See also ==
- List of New Testament minuscules
- Biblical manuscript
- Textual criticism
