= Minuscule 419 =

- New Testament manuscript
- Text: Gospels †
- Date: 12th century
- Script: Greek
- Now at: Biblioteca Marciana
- Size: 19.5 cm by 15.6 cm
- Type: Byzantine text-type
- Category: V
- Note: full marginalia

Minuscule 419 (in the Gregory-Aland numbering), ε 232 (in the Soden numbering), is a Greek minuscule manuscript of the New Testament, on parchment. Palaeographically it has been assigned to the 12th century. The manuscript has complex contents. It has marginalia.

== Description ==
The codex contains the text of the four Gospels on 262 parchment leaves (19.5 cm by 15.6 cm) with some lacunae. The text is written in one column per page, in 22 lines per page.

The text is divided according to the κεφαλαια (chapters), whose numbers are given at the margin, and their τιτλοι (titles) at the top of the pages. There is also a division according to the Ammonian Sections (no references to the Eusebian Canons).

It contains tables of the κεφαλαια (tables of contents) before each Gospel, lectionary equipment at the margin for liturgical use, subscriptions at the end of each Gospel, and music notes.

The texts of John 8:44-11:33; 21:7-25 is written on paper and was added in the 16th century.

== Text ==
The Greek text of the codex is a representative of the Byzantine text-type. Aland placed it in Category V. According to the Claremont Profile Method it represents textual family K^{x} in Luke 1, Luke 10, and Luke 20. It creates a textual pair with 272.

== History ==
Formerly the manuscript was housed at the monastery of St. Michael de Muriano in Venice. The manuscript was described by Mittarelli (1708-1777), along with the codex 595. It was added to the list of New Testament manuscripts by Scholz (1794-1852). C. R. Gregory saw it in 1886.

The manuscript is currently housed at the Biblioteca Marciana (Gr. I. 60) in Venice.

== See also ==
- List of New Testament minuscules
- Biblical manuscript
- Textual criticism
