= Antonio Maria Biscioni =

Italian historian, philologist, and librarian (1674–1756)

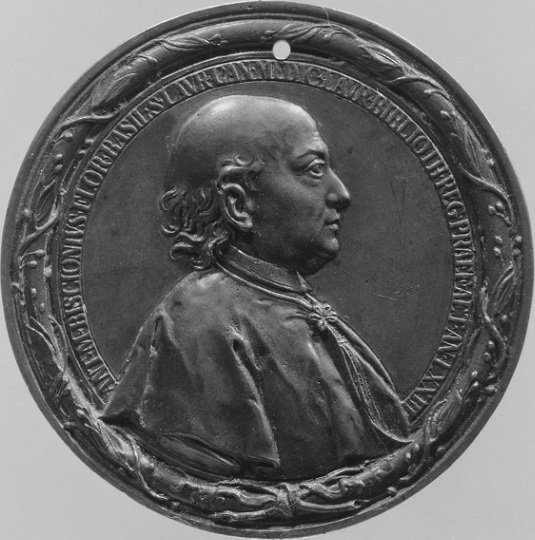
- Antonio Maria Biscioni, medal by Lorenzo Maria Weber (ca. 1697–1764)
- Born: 14 August 1674; Florence, Grand Duchy of Tuscany
- Died: 4 May 1756 (aged 81); Florence, Grand Duchy of Tuscany
- Occupation: Philologist, librarian

Antonio Maria Biscioni (14 August 1674 – 4 May 1756) was an Italian historian, philologist, and librarian for the Laurentian library of Florence. He was born in Florence and entered religious orders. Among his pupils were Giovanni Gaetano Bottari. He wrote a history of Pistoia in the 14th-century: Historie pistolesi, ovvero delle cose avvenute in Toscana dall'anno 1300 al 1348. He catalogued the Hebrew and Greek biblical texts in the Laurenziana: Bibliothecae Ebraicae Graecae Florentinae, sive Bibliothecae Mediceo-Laurenzianae, Volume 1. He was a member of the Accademia della Crusca.

== Works ==
- Parere sopra la seconda edizione de' Canti Carnascialeschi e in difesa della prima edizione, by Antonmaria Biscioni, procured by Anton Francesco Grazzini, detto il Lasca. Francesco Moüke, Florence; 1750.
- Lettere di Santi e Beati Fiorentini, Volumes 57-128, 1839.
- Benedetto Menzini, Le Satire with notes by Antonio Maria Salvini, Antonio Maria Biscioni, and Giorgio Van der Broodt. 1769.
