= List of New Testament minuscules (501–600) =

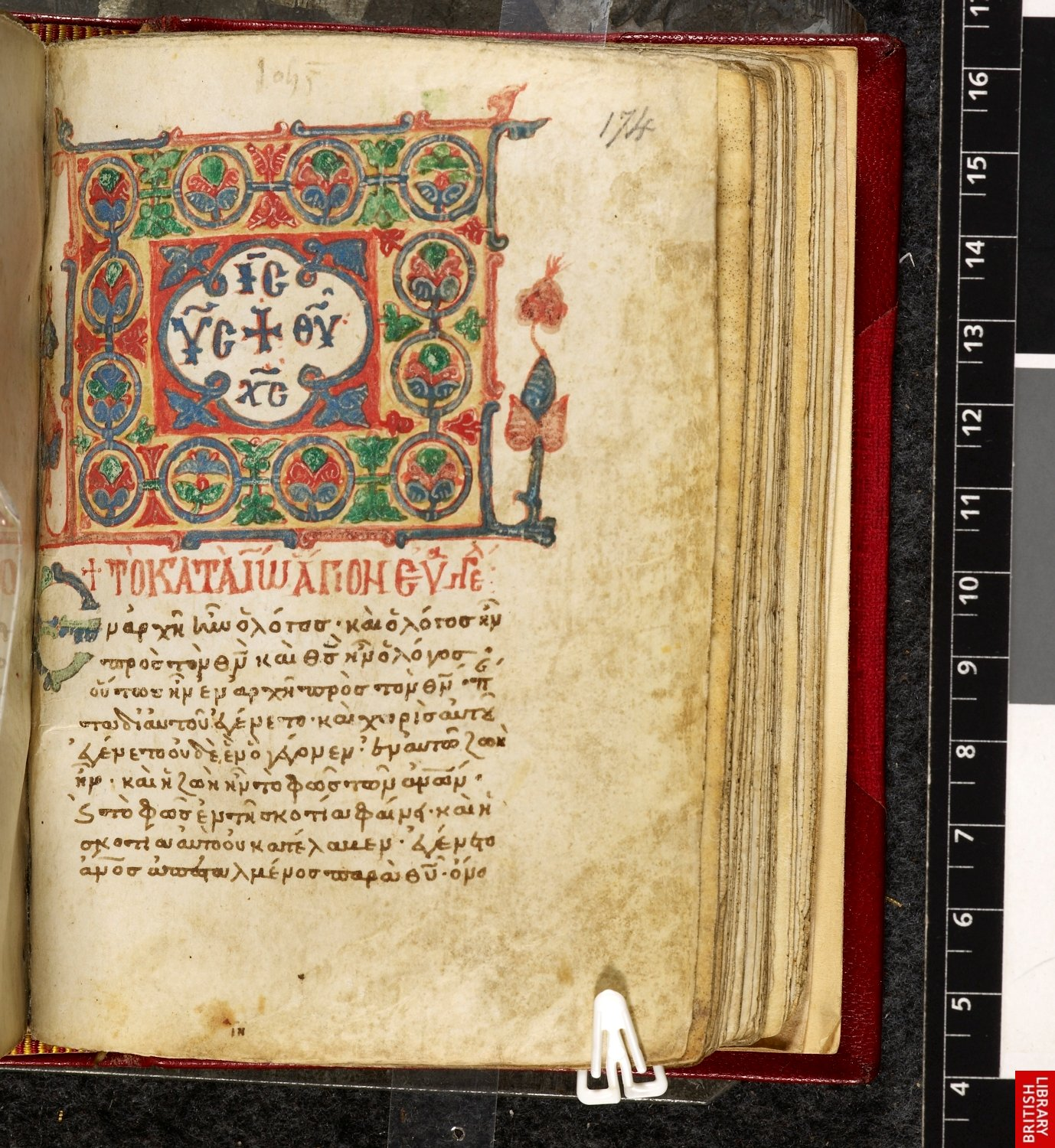
Beginning of the Gospel of John, with the decorated headpiece, in Minuscule 505 from 12th century.

A New Testament minuscule is a copy of a portion of the New Testament written in a small, cursive Greek script (developed from Uncial).

== Legend ==
- The numbers (#) are the now standard system of Caspar René Gregory, often referred to as the Gregory-Aland numbers.
- Dates are estimated to the nearest 100 year increment where specific date is unknown.
- Content generally only describes sections of the New Testament: Gospels, The Acts of the Apostles (Acts), Pauline epistles, and so on. Sometimes the surviving portion of a codex is so limited that specific books, chapters or even verses can be indicated. Linked articles, where they exist, generally specify content in detail, by verse.
- Digital images are referenced with direct links to the hosting web pages, with the exception of those at the INTF. The quality and accessibility of the images is as follows:

Gold color indicates high resolution color images available online.
Tan color indicates high resolution color images available locally, not online.
Light tan color indicates only a small fraction of manuscript pages with color images available online.
Light gray color indicates black/white or microfilm images available online.
Light blue color indicates manuscript not imaged, and is currently lost or ownership unknown.
Light pink color indicates manuscript destroyed, presumed destroyed, or deemed too fragile to digitize.
Violet color indicates high resolution ultraviolet images available online.

† Indicates the manuscript has damaged or missing pages.
^{P} Indicates only a portion of the books were included.
^{K} Indicates manuscript also includes a commentary.
^{S} Indicates lost portions of manuscript replaced via supplement of a later hand.
^{abs} (abschrift) Indicates manuscript is copy.
[ ] Brackets around Gregory-Aland number indicate the manuscript belongs to an already numbered manuscript, was found to not be a continuous text manuscript, was found to be written in modern Greek versus Koine Greek, was proved a forgery, or has been destroyed.

== Minuscules 501-600 ==
#	Date	Contents	Pages	Institution and refs.	City, State	Country	Images
501	13th	Gospels^{S}†	157	British Library, Add MS 18211	London	UK	BL
501	13th	Gospels^{S}†	157	British Library, Add MS 18211	London	UK	INTF
502	12th	Gospels†	235	British Library, Add MS 19387	London	UK	BL
502	12th	Gospels†	235	British Library, Add MS 19387	London	UK	INTF
503	13th	John	60	British Library, Add MS 19389	London	UK	BL
503	13th	John	60	British Library, Add MS 19389	London	UK	INTF
504	1033	Gospels	287	British Library, Add MS 17470	London	UK	BL
504	1033	Gospels	287	British Library, Add MS 17470	London	UK	INTF
505	12th	Gospels	226	British Library, Harley MS 5538	London	UK	BL
505	12th	Gospels	226	British Library, Harley MS 5538	London	UK	INTF
506	11th	New Testament†	240	Christ Church, Wake 12	Oxford	UK	INTF
507	11th	Gospels	221	Christ Church, Wake 21	Oxford	UK	INTF
508	13th	Gospels†	168	Christ Church, Wake 22	Oxford	UK	INTF
509	12th	Gospels	229	Christ Church, Wake 24	Oxford	UK	INTF
510	12th	Gospels	305	Christ Church, Wake 25	Oxford	UK	INTF
511	13th	Gospels†	337	Christ Church, Wake 27	Oxford	UK	INTF
512	14th	Gospels	210	Christ Church, Wake 28	Oxford	UK	INTF
513	1130	Gospels†	162	Christ Church, Wake 29	Oxford	UK	INTF
514	12th	Gospels	227	Christ Church, Wake 30	Oxford	UK	INTF
515	11th	Gospels	127	Christ Church, Wake 31	Oxford	UK	INTF
516	11th	Gospels	287	Christ Church, Wake 32	Oxford	UK	INTF
517	11th/12th	New Testament †	201	Christ Church, Wake 34	Oxford	UK	CSNTM, INTF
518	12th	Gospels	249	Christ Church, Wake 36	Oxford	UK	INTF
519	13th	Gospels	308	Christ Church, Wake 39	Oxford	UK	INTF
520	12th	Gospels	213	Christ Church, Wake 40	Oxford	UK	INTF
521	1321/1322	Gospels	271	Bodleian Library, MS. Gr. bib. d. 1	Oxford	UK	INTF
522	1515/1516	New Testament	319	Bodleian Library, MS. Canon. Gr. 34	Oxford	UK	INTF
523	14th	Gospels	270	Bodleian Library, MS. Canon. Gr. 36	Oxford	UK	INTF
523	14th	Gospels	270	Bodleian Library, MS. Canon. Gr. 36	Oxford	UK	DB
524	12th	Gospels	184	Bodleian Library, MS. Canon. Gr. 112	Oxford	UK	INTF
525	15th	Gospels (gr-sl)	312	Bodleian Library, MS. Canon. Gr. 122	Oxford	UK	INTF
525	15th	Gospels (gr-sl)	312	Bodleian Library, MS. Canon. Gr. 122	Oxford	UK	DB
526	11th	Luke 23:38-50; 24:46-53; John 1:30-3:5	6	Bodleian Library, MS. Barocci 59	Oxford	UK	DB
526	11th	Luke 23:38-50; 24:46-53; John 1:30-3:5	6	Bodleian Library, MS. Barocci 59	Oxford	UK	INTF
527	11th	Gospels	216	Bodleian Library, MS. Cromwell 15	Oxford	UK	INTF
528	11th	Gospels	354	Bodleian Library, MS. Cromwell 16	Oxford	UK	INTF
528	11th	Gospels	354	Bodleian Library, MS. Cromwell 16	Oxford	UK	DB
529	12th	Gospels	362	Bodleian Library, MS. Auct. D. inf. 2. 21	Oxford	UK	INTF
530	11th	Gospels†	303	Bodleian Library, MS. Rawl. G. 3	Oxford	UK	INTF
531	12th	Mark, Luke	96	University of Birmingham Cadbury Research Library, Braithwaite 1	Birmingham	UK	INTF
532	11th	Gospels†	249	University of Michigan, Ms. 22	Ann Arbor	USA	CSNTM
532	11th	Gospels†	249	University of Michigan, Ms. 22	Ann Arbor	USA	INTF
533	13th	Gospels†	237	University of Michigan, Ms. 21	Ann Arbor	USA	CSNTM, INTF
534	12th	Gospels†	270	University of Michigan, Ms. 26	Ann Arbor	USA	CSNTM
534	12th	Gospels†	270	University of Michigan, Ms. 26	Ann Arbor	USA	INTF
535	13th	Matthew, Mark	125	University of Michigan, Ms. 20	Ann Arbor	USA	CSNTM, INTF
536	13th	Gospels, Acts†, Pauline Epistles	174	University of Michigan, Ms. 24	Ann Arbor	USA	CSNTM, INTF
537	12th	Gospels	144	University of Michigan, Ms. 19	Ann Arbor	USA	CSNTM, INTF
538	12th	Gospels†	212	University of Michigan, Ms. 18	Ann Arbor	USA	CSNTM
538	12th	Gospels†	212	University of Michigan, Ms. 18	Ann Arbor	USA	INTF
539	11th	Gospels†	173	Owner unknown. Formerly: Sotheby			
540	14th	Gospel of Mark†	27	University of Michigan, Ms. 23a	Ann Arbor	USA	CSNTM, INTF
541	15th	Matthew†, Mark†	49	University of Michigan, Ms. 23b	Ann Arbor	USA	CSNTM, INTF
542=2603							
543	12th	Gospels†	184	University of Michigan, Ms. 15	Ann Arbor	USA	CSNTM, INTF
544	13th	Gospels	256	University of Michigan, Ms. 25	Ann Arbor	USA	CSNTM
544	13th	Gospels	256	University of Michigan, Ms. 25	Ann Arbor	USA	INTF
545	1430	Gospels	430	University of Michigan, Ms. 30	Ann Arbor	USA	CSNTM, INTF
546	13th	Gospels†	276	University of Michigan, Ms. 27	Ann Arbor	USA	CSNTM, INTF
547	11th	Gospels, Acts, Pauline Epistles, General Epistles	348	British Library, Add MS 39590	London	UK	BL
547	11th	Gospels, Acts, Pauline Epistles, General Epistles	348	British Library, Add MS 39590	London	UK	INTF
548	11th	Gospels	166	British Library, Add MS 39591	London	UK	BL
548	11th	Gospels	166	British Library, Add MS 39591	London	UK	INTF
549	11th	Gospels	217	British Library, Add MS 39592	London	UK	BL
549	11th	Gospels	217	British Library, Add MS 39592	London	UK	INTF
550	12th	Gospels	211	British Library, Add MS 39593	London	UK	BL
550	12th	Gospels	211	British Library, Add MS 39593	London	UK	INTF
551	12th	Gospels	233	British Library, Add MS 39594	London	UK	BL
552	12th	Gospels	252	British Library, Add MS 39595	London	UK	BL
552	12th	Gospels	252	British Library, Add MS 39595	London	UK	INTF
553	13th	Gospels	303	British Library, Add MS 39596	London	UK	BL
553	13th	Gospels	303	British Library, Add MS 39596	London	UK	INTF
554	1271-2	Gospels	230	British Library, Add MS 39597	London	UK	BL
555	15th	Gospels	185	Cambridge University Library, Hh. 6.12	Cambridge	UK	INTF
556	12th	Gospels	197	Bodmer Library, Cod. Bodmer 25	Cologny	Switzerland	e-codices, INTF
557	13th	Gospels	183	Bodleian Library, MS. Holkham Gr. 114	Oxford	UK	INTF
557	13th	Gospels	183	Bodleian Library, MS. Holkham Gr. 114	Oxford	UK	DB
558	13th	Gospels	352	Bodleian Library, MS. Holkham Gr. 115	Oxford	UK	INTF
558	13th	Gospels	352	Bodleian Library, MS. Holkham Gr. 115	Oxford	UK	DB
559	11th	Gospels†	152	Sion College, Arc L 40.2/G 3	London	UK	INTF
559	11th	Gospels†	152	Sion College, Arc L 40.2/G 3	London	UK	LP
560	11th	Gospels	367	Glasgow University Library, Ms. Hunter 475	Glasgow	UK	CSNTM, INTF
560	11th	Gospels	367	Glasgow University Library, Ms. Hunter 475	Glasgow	UK	UOG
561	13th	Gospels	290	Glasgow University Library, Ms. Hunter 476	Glasgow	UK	CSNTM
561	13th	Gospels	290	Glasgow University Library, Ms. Hunter 476	Glasgow	UK	INTF
562	16th	John	79	Glasgow University Library, Ms. Hunter 170	Glasgow	UK	CSNTM
562	16th	John	79	Glasgow University Library, Ms. Hunter 170	Glasgow	UK	INTF
563	11th	Gospels	198	Edinburgh University Library, Ms. 219	Edinburgh	UK	CSNTM
563	11th	Gospels	198	Edinburgh University Library, Ms. 219	Edinburgh	UK	INTF
564	10th	Gospels	360	Leipzig University Library, Cod. Gr. 6	Leipzig	Germany	INTF
565	9th	Gospels†	405	National Library of Russia, Gr. 53	Saint Petersburg	Russia	INTF
566 + [2149]	9th	Matthew and Mark	122	National Library of Russia, Gr. 54, Gr. 282	Saint Petersburg	Russia	INTF
567	13th	Acts†, General Epistles†, Pauline Epistles†	243	National Library, Grec 103 A	Paris	France	BnF, INTF
568	10th	Gospels	259	National Library of Russia, Gr. 67	Saint Petersburg	Russia	INTF
569	1061	Gospels	358	National Library of Russia, Gr. 72	Saint Petersburg	Russia	INTF
570	12th	Gospels†	194	National Library of Russia, Gr. 97	Saint Petersburg	Russia	INTF
571	12th	Gospels†	194	National Library of Russia, Gr. 98	Saint Petersburg	Russia	INTF
[572] = 1231							
573	13th	Gospels	189	University of Birmingham Cadbury Research Library, Braithwaite 2	Birmingham	UK	INTF
574	13th	Gospels†	215	National Library of Russia, Gr. 105	Saint Petersburg	Russia	INTF
575	15th	Gospels	386	National Library of Russia, Gr. 118	Saint Petersburg	Russia	INTF
[576] + 435							
577	1346	Gospels	259	Interuniversity Library, H. 446	Montpellier	France	INTF
578	1361	Gospels	241	Public Library, 970	Arras	France	INTF
579	13th	Gospels	152	National Library, Grec 97	Paris	France	BnF, INTF, CSNTM
580	12th	Gospels	385	National Library, Grec 119	Paris	France	BnF, INTF
581	14th	Gospels	237	Ariostea Municipal Library, Cl. II, 119	Ferrara	Italy	INTF
582	1334	New Testament	114	Ariostea Municipal Library, Cl. II, 187	Ferrara	Italy	INTF
583	11th	Gospels	285	Palatina Library, Ms. Pal. 5	Parma	Italy	INTF
584	10th	Gospels	319	Palatina Library, Ms. Parm. 65	Parma	Italy	INTF
585	11th	Gospels	300	Estense Library, G. 1, α.M.9.5. (II A 1)	Modena	Italy	INTF
586	14th	Gospels	239	Estense Library, G. 5, α.M.9.14. (II A 5)	Modena	Italy	CSNTM
586	14th	Gospels	239	Estense Library, G. 5, α.M.9.14. (II A 5)	Modena	Italy	INTF
587	12th	Gospels	183	Ambrosiana Library, M 48 sup.	Milan	Italy	INTF
588	1321	Gospels†	221	Ambrosiana Library, E 63 sup.	Milan	Italy	INTF
589	14th	Theophylact Commentary on Luke†, John†	120	Ambrosiana Library, A 178 sup.	Milan	Italy	INTF
590	13th	Theophylact Commentary on Matthew, Mark	161	Palatina Library, Ms. Pal. 15	Parma	Italy	INTF
591	13th	Gospels	220	Library of the National Lincei and Corsinian Academy, Rossi 24 (41.G.16)	Rome	Italy	INTF
592	1289	Gospels, Acts, Pauline Epistles, General Epistles	295	Ambrosiana Library, Z 34 sup.	Milan	Italy	INTF
593	13th	Mark†, Luke†, John†	153	Marciana National Library, Gr. I,58 (1214)	Venice	Italy	INTF
594	14th	Matthew, Mark, Luke 1:1-23:15, 23:33-48†	241	San Lazzaro Library, 1531	Venice	Italy	INTF
595	16th	Gospels†	155	Marciana National Library, Gr. I,56 (1324)	Venice	Italy	INTF
596	11th	Theophylact Commentary on Matthew, Mark†	228	Marciana National Library, Gr. I,57 (995)	Venice	Italy	INTF
597	13th	Gospels	259	Marciana National Library, Gr. I,59 (1277)	Venice	Italy	INTF
598	13th	Luke	58	Marciana National Library, Gr. Z. 494 (331), fol. 1-58	Venice	Italy	INTF
599	15th	Gospels	441	Marciana National Library, Gr. Z. 495 (1048)	Venice	Italy	INTF
600	14th	Zigabenus Commentary on the Gospels	430	Marciana National Library, Gr. II. 7 (979)	Venice	Italy	INTF

[top]

== See also ==
- List of New Testament papyri
- List of New Testament uncials
- List of New Testament minuscules (1–1000)
- List of New Testament minuscules (1001–2000)
- List of New Testament minuscules (2001–)
- List of New Testament minuscules ordered by Location/Institution
- List of New Testament lectionaries

== Bibliography ==
- Aland, Kurt; M. Welte; B. Köster; K. Junack (1994). Kurzgefasste Liste der griechischen Handschriften des Neues Testaments. Berlin, New York: Walter de Gruyter. p. 95. ISBN 3-11-011986-2.
- "Liste Handschriften". Münster: Institute for New Testament Textual Research.
