= Minuscule 517 =

- New Testament manuscript
- Text: New Testament †
- Date: 11th/12th century
- Script: Greek
- Now at: Christ Church, Oxford
- Size: 25.5 cm by 19.5 cm
- Type: mixed
- Category: none
- Note: full marginalia

Minuscule 517 is a Greek minuscule manuscript of the New Testament, made of parchment. It is designated by the siglum 517 in the Gregory-Aland numbering of New Testament manuscripts, and as ε 167 α 214 in the von Soden numbering of New Testament manuscripts. Biblical scholar Frederick H. A. Scrivener labeled it by number 503.

Using the study of comparative writing styles (palaeography), it has been dated to the 11th or 12th century. The manuscript has some missing sections. It was adapted for liturgical use.

== Description ==
The manuscript is a codex (precursor to the modern book format), containing the text of the New Testament on 201 parchment leaves (sized 25.5 cm by 19.5 cm), with major gaps: Acts 1:1-17:24; 18:13-28:31; 1 John 3:9-4:9; Hebrews 7:26-9:28; Luke 2:15-46; 6:42-24:53; and the entirety of the Gospel of John. Originally it would've contained the entire New Testament. Some of the missing portions were supplied by a later hand. It is written one column per page, 29-31 lines per page.

The text is divided according to the chapters (known as κεφαλαια / kephalaia), whose numbers are given in the margin, and their titles (known as τιτλοι / titloi) written at the top of the pages. There is also a division according to the Ammonian Sections (234 in Mark, the last in 16:9), but there are no references to the Eusebian Canons.

It contains introductions (known as prolegomena) to all the Pauline and Catholic epistles; the tables of contents (also known as κεφαλαια) are placed before each Gospel; lectionary markings are written in the margin (for liturgical use), along with the Euthalian Apparatus. The manuscript has 10 cases of homoeoteleuton (omission of words/phrases due to words with similar ending letters), 196 cases of movable nu (this is the removal of the final letter ν in verbs before another word starting with a consonant), and 106 itacisms (mispellings of words due to like sounding letters such as ι η υ etc.).

The order of books is as follows:

- Acts
- Catholic Epistles
- Apocalypse
- Pauline Epistles
- Gospels

== Text ==
The Greek text of the codex is considered to be a mixture of different text-types, with no alignment with any. Biblical scholar Kurt Aland did not place it in any category of his New Testament manuscript classificaion system.

According to the Claremont Profile Method (a specific analysis of textual data), it represents textual cluster 1675 in Luke 1 as a core member. No profile was made in Luke 10 or Luke 20 as the manuscript is defective.

== History ==
The earliest history of the manuscript is unknown. In 1727 it came from Constantinople to England, and was presented to the Archbishop of Canterbury, William Wake, together with minuscules 73, 74, and 506-520. Wake presented it to Christ Church College in Oxford.

The manuscript was collated by Scrivener, and was added by him to the list of New Testament minuscule manuscripts (503). Biblical scholar Caspar René Gregory gave it the number 517. Biblical scholar Herman C. Hoskier collated the text of the Apocalypse.

It is currently dated by the INTF to the 11th century. It is presently housed at Christ Church (Wake 34) in Oxford.

== See also ==
- Minuscule 518
- Minuscule 516
- List of New Testament minuscules
- Biblical manuscript
- Textual criticism
