= Minuscule 540 =

- New Testament manuscript
- Text: Gospel of Mark
- Date: 14th century
- Script: Greek
- Now at: University of Michigan
- Size: 18 cm by 13.8 cm
- Type: Byzantine text-type
- Category: V
- Hand: neatly written
- Note: marginalia

Minuscule 540 (in the Gregory-Aland numbering), ε 439 (in Soden's numbering), is a Greek minuscule manuscript of the New Testament, on a parchment. Palaeographically it has been assigned to the 14th century. Scrivener labelled it by number 553. It has marginalia. The manuscript has no complex context.

== Description ==
The codex contains the text of the Gospel of Mark, on 27 parchment leaves (size 18 cm by 13.8 cm), with some lacunae (3:21-4:13; 4:37-7:29; 8:15-27; 9:9-10:5; 10:29-12:32). It is written in one column per page, 17-21 lines per page. According to Scrivener it is neatly written. The original codex consist 48 leaves.

The error of itacism is rare (20 occurrences); it has iota subscriptum; error of homoioteleuton is found only in Mark 9:38; N εφελκυστικον occurs 25 times, mostly with ειπεν.

The text is divided according to the κεφαλαια (chapters), whose numbers are given at the margin, with their τιτλοι (titles of chapters) at the top of the pages. There is also a division according to the smaller Ammonian Sections, with references to the Eusebian Canons (written below Ammonian Section numbers).

== Text ==
The Greek text of the codex is a representative of the Byzantine. Aland placed it in Category V.

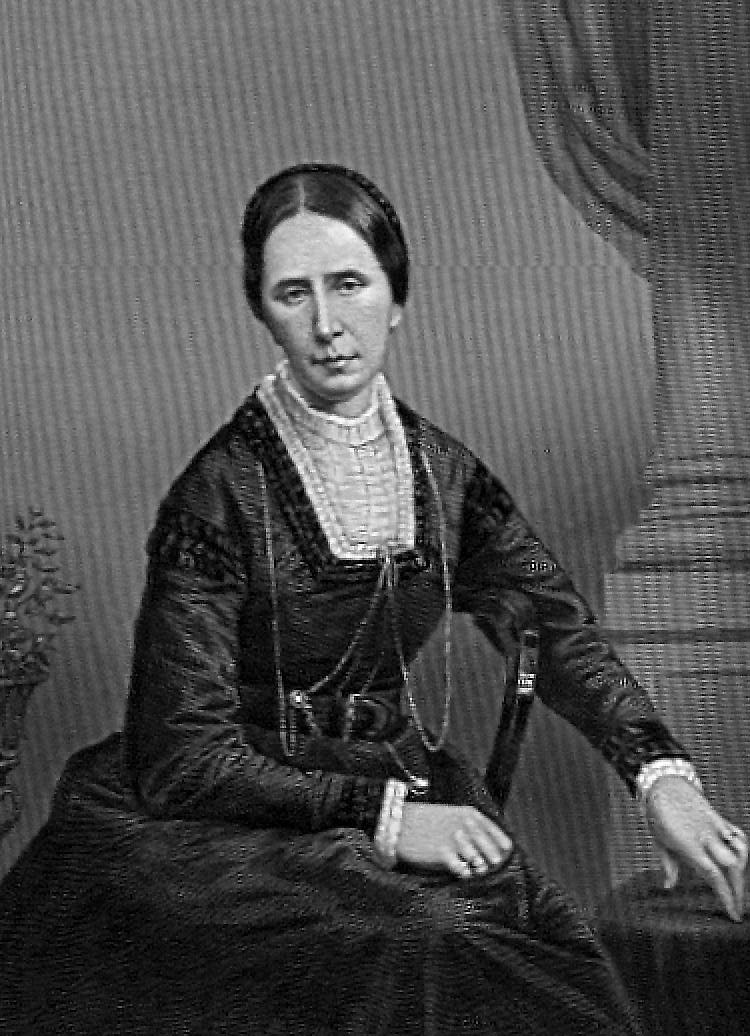
The Lady Burdett-Coutts

== History ==
C. R. Gregory dated the manuscript to the 14th century. Currently it is dated by the INTF to the 14th century.

In 1864 the manuscript was purchased from a dealer at Janina in Epeiros, by Baroness Burdett-Coutts (1814–1906), a philanthropist, together with other Greek manuscripts (among them codices 532-546). They were transported to England in 1870-1871.

The manuscript was presented by Burdett-Coutts to Sir Roger Cholmely's School, and was housed at the Highgate (Burdett-Coutts II. 26. 1), in London. It was examined and collated by Scrivener in his Adversaria critica sacra (as m).

It was added to the list of the New Testament manuscripts by F. H. A. Scrivener (553) and C. R. Gregory (540). Gregory saw it in 1883.

It is currently housed at the University of Michigan (Ms. Inv. No. 23a) in Ann Arbor.

== See also ==
- List of New Testament minuscules
- Biblical manuscript
- Textual criticism
