= Minuscule 515 =

- New Testament manuscript
- Text: Gospels
- Date: 11th century
- Script: Greek
- Now at: Christ Church, Oxford
- Size: 17.8 cm by 13 cm
- Type: Byzantine text-type/mixed
- Category: none
- Hand: elegant
- Note: full marginalia

Minuscule 515 (in the Gregory-Aland numbering), ε 143 (in the Soden numbering), is a Greek minuscule manuscript of the New Testament, on parchment. Palaeographically it has been assigned to the 11th century. Scrivener labelled it by number 501. The manuscript is lacunose. It was adapted for liturgical use.

== Description ==
The codex contains the text of the four Gospels on 127 parchment leaves (size 17.8 cm by 13 cm) with only one lacunae (John 21:22-25). The text of John 21:22-25 was supplied by a later hand. The text is written in one column per page, 33-35 lines per page. It is written in very elegant and minute hand.

The text is divided according to the κεφαλαια (chapters), whose numbers are given at the margin of the text, and their τιτλοι (titles of chapters) at the top (in gold). The text is also divided according to the Ammonian Sections, but there are no references to the Eusebian Canons.

The tables of the κεφαλαια (tables of contents) are placed before each Gospel. It contains lectionary markings at the margin (for liturgical use), some στιχοι, incipits (later hand), and pictures.

== Text ==
The Greek text of the codex is a representative of the Byzantine text-type. It is close textually to the textual family Family Π, but with some alien readings. Aland did not place it in any Category.

According to the Claremont Profile Method it represents textual Π473 in Luke 1 and Luke 10. In Luke 20 it represents Π6.

== History ==
Location

In 1727 the manuscript came from Constantinople to England and was presented to archbishop of Canterbury, William Wake, together with minuscules 73, 74, 506-520. Wake presented it to Christ Church in Oxford. It is currently housed at Christ Church (Wake 31) in Oxford.

Examination

The manuscript was added to the list of New Testament minuscule manuscripts by F. H. A. Scrivener (501) and C. R. Gregory (515). Gregory saw it in 1883.

It is dated by the INTF to the 11th century.

== See also ==
- List of New Testament minuscules
- Biblical manuscript
- Textual criticism
