= Minuscule 513 =

- New Testament manuscript
- Text: Gospels †
- Date: 1130
- Script: Greek
- Now at: Christ Church, Oxford
- Size: 19.9 cm by 16.2 cm
- Type: Byzantine text-type/mixed
- Category: none
- Note: full marginalia

Minuscule 513 (in the Gregory-Aland numbering), ε 261 (in the Soden numbering), is a Greek minuscule manuscript of the New Testament, on parchment. Dated by a colophon to the 12th century. Scrivener labeled it by number 499. The manuscript is lacunose. Full marginalia. It was adapted for liturgical use.

== Description ==
The codex contains the complete text of the four Gospels on 162 parchment leaves (size 19.9 cm by 16.2 cm) with some lacunae (Matthew 5:3–30; 8:4–25; 13:46–18:28; Luke 1:44–75; 4:42–5:36; 8:10–28; 11:13–33; 14:11–31; John 20:12–21:1). Matthew 1:1–5:3 was supplied on paper by a later hand. It is written in one column per page, 25 lines per page.

The text is divided according to the κεφαλαια (chapters), whose numbers are given at the margin, and their τιτλοι (titles of chapters) at the top of the pages. There is also a division according to the Ammonian Sections (in Mark 236 Sections – the last in 16:12), with references to the Eusebian Canons (written at the margin below Ammonian Section numbers).

The tables of the κεφαλαια (tables of contents) are placed before each Gospel, lectionary markings at the margin, subscriptions at the end of each Gospel, and στιχοι.

== Text ==
The Greek text of the codex is a representative of a mixture of text-types with predominate the Byzantine element. Hermann von Soden included it to Ι^{β}. Aland did not place it in any Category.

According to the Claremont Profile Method it has a mixture of the Byzantine families in Luke 1. In Luke 10 and Luke 20 it belongs to the textual cluster 1216 as a weak member.

== History ==
The manuscript was written by Chariton, a monk. In 1727 the manuscript came from Constantinople to England and was presented to archbishop of Canterbury, William Wake, together with minuscules 73, 74, 506-520. Wake presented it to Christ Church in Oxford.

The manuscript was added to the list of New Testament minuscule manuscripts by F. H. A. Scrivener (499) and C. R. Gregory (513). Gregory saw it in 1883.

It is currently housed at Christ Church (Wake 29) in Oxford.

== See also ==
- List of New Testament minuscules
- Biblical manuscript
- Textual criticism
