= Minuscule 508 =

- New Testament manuscript
- Text: Gospels †
- Date: 13th-century
- Script: Greek
- Now at: Christ Church, Oxford
- Size: 26.6 cm by 18.5 cm
- Type: Byzantine text-type
- Category: none
- Hand: wretched hand
- Note: bad condition full marginalia

Minuscule 508 (in the Gregory-Aland numbering), ε 431 (in the Soden numbering), is a Greek minuscule manuscript of the New Testament, on parchment. Palaeographically it has been assigned to the 13th-century. Scrivener labelled it by number 494. It was adapted for liturgical use. The manuscript is lacunose.

== Description ==
The codex contains the text of the four Gospels on 168 parchment leaves (size 26.6 cm by 18.5 cm) with some lacunae (Matthew 1:1-23; 5:26-6:23; Luke 24:9-28; John 3:14-4:1; 15:9-16:6; 19:31-21:25). The text is written in one column per page, 24-27 lines per page.

The text is divided according to the κεφαλαια (chapters), whose numbers are given at the margin, and their τιτλοι (titles of chapters) at the top of the pages. There is also a division according to the smaller Ammonian Sections (in Mark 241 Sections, the last section in 16:9b), (no references to the Eusebian Canons).

It contains the tables of the κεφαλαια (tables of contents) before each Gospel, lectionary markings at the margin (for liturgical use), incipits, and subscriptions – with numbers of στιχοι – at the end of each Gospel. It was written in wretched hand, the manuscript has survived in bad condition.

== Text ==
The Greek text of the codex is a representative of the Byzantine text-type with some alien readings. Aland did not place it in any Category. According to the Claremont Profile Method it represents textual family K^{x} in Luke 20, mixed Byzantine text in Luke 10, and mixed text in Luke 1. It has some relationship to M groups.

== History ==
The manuscript came from Constantinople to England about 1731, and was presented to archbishop of Canterbury, William Wake, together with minuscules 73, 74, 506-520. Wake presented it to Christ Church in Oxford.

The manuscript was added to the list of New Testament minuscule manuscripts by F. H. A. Scrivener (494) and C. R. Gregory (508). Gregory saw it in 1883.

It is currently housed at Christ Church (Wake 22) in Oxford.

== See also ==
- List of New Testament minuscules
- Biblical manuscript
- Textual criticism
