= Minuscule 514 =

- New Testament manuscript
- Text: Gospels
- Date: 12th century
- Script: Greek
- Now at: Christ Church, Oxford
- Size: 18.5 cm by 14 cm
- Type: Byzantine text-type
- Category: V
- Hand: neatly written
- Note: bad condition marginalia

Minuscule 514 (in the Gregory-Aland numbering), ε 262 ^{Θ^{ε14}} (in the Soden numbering), is a Greek minuscule manuscript of the New Testament, on parchment. Palaeographically it has been assigned to the 12th century. Scrivener labelled it by number 500. The manuscript has complex contents.

== Description ==
The codex contains the complete text of the four Gospels on 227 parchment leaves (size 18.5 cm by 14 cm) with only one lacunae (John 20:18-21:25). Written in one column per page, 23 lines per page, in neat characters.

The text is divided according to the κεφαλαια (chapters), whose numbers are given at the margin, and their τιτλοι (titles of chapters) at the top of the pages. There is also a division according to the Ammonian Sections, with references to the Eusebian Canons.

It contains prolegomena, the Eusebian tables, tables of the κεφαλαια (tables of contents) before each Gospel, but they are almost illegible, and subscriptions at the end of each books.

== Text ==
The Greek text of the codex is a representative of the Byzantine text-type. Hermann von Soden included it to the textual family K^{x}. Aland placed it in Category V.

According to the Claremont Profile Method it represents textual family K^{x} in Luke 1 and Luke 20. In Luke 10 no profile was made.

== History ==
The manuscript is dated by the INTF to the 12th century.

In 1727 the manuscript came from Constantinople to England and was presented to archbishop of Canterbury, William Wake, together with minuscules 73, 74, 506-520. Wake presented it to Christ Church in Oxford.

The manuscript was added to the list of New Testament minuscule manuscripts by F. H. A. Scrivener (500) and C. R. Gregory (514). Gregory saw it in 1883.

It is currently housed at Christ Church (Wake 30) in Oxford.

== See also ==
- List of New Testament minuscules
- Biblical manuscript
- Textual criticism
