= Minuscule 518 =

- New Testament manuscript
- Text: Gospels
- Date: 12th century
- Script: Greek
- Now at: Christ Church, Oxford
- Size: 15.9 cm by 13 cm
- Type: Byzantine text-type
- Category: V
- Note: marginalia

Minuscule 518 (in the Gregory-Aland numbering), 504 (Scrivener's numbering), ε 263 (in the Soden numbering), is a Greek minuscule manuscript of the New Testament, on parchment. Palaeographically it has been assigned to the 12th century. It was adapted for liturgical use, it has marginalia.

== Description ==
The codex contains the complete text of the four Gospels on 249 parchment leaves (size 15.9 cm by 13 cm) with only one lacunae (Matthew 16:2-17). The text is written in one column per page, 23 lines per page.

The text is divided according to the κεφαλαια (chapters), whose numbers are given at the margin, and the τιτλοι (titles of chapters) at the top of the pages. There is also a division according to the smaller Ammonian Sections (in Mark 240 Sections, the last in 16:19), (no references the Eusebian Canons).

It contains prolegomena (to Luke), the Eusebian tables, tables of the κεφαλαια (tables of contents) before each Gospel, lectionary markings at the margin (for liturgical use), incipits, αναγνωσεις (lessons), liturgical books with hagiographies (Synaxarion and Menologion), and pictures (portrait of Luke and John).

== Text ==
The Greek text of the codex is a representative of the Byzantine text-type. Hermann von Soden included it to the I^{φr} group, it is similar to M group with Codex Campianus. Aland placed it in Category V.

According to the Claremont Profile Method it represents textual family Π^{a} in Luke 1 (except beginning of Luke 1) and M27 in Luke 10 and Luke 20.

== History ==
In 1727 the manuscript came from Constantinople to England and was presented to archbishop of Canterbury, William Wake, together with the manuscripts 73, 74, 506-520. Wake presented it to Christ Church in Oxford.

The manuscript was added to the list of New Testament minuscule manuscripts by F. H. A. Scrivener (504) and C. R. Gregory (518), who saw it in 1883.

It is currently housed at Christ Church (Wake 36) in Oxford.

== See also ==
- List of New Testament minuscules
- Biblical manuscript
- Textual criticism
