= Minuscule 545 =

- New Testament manuscript
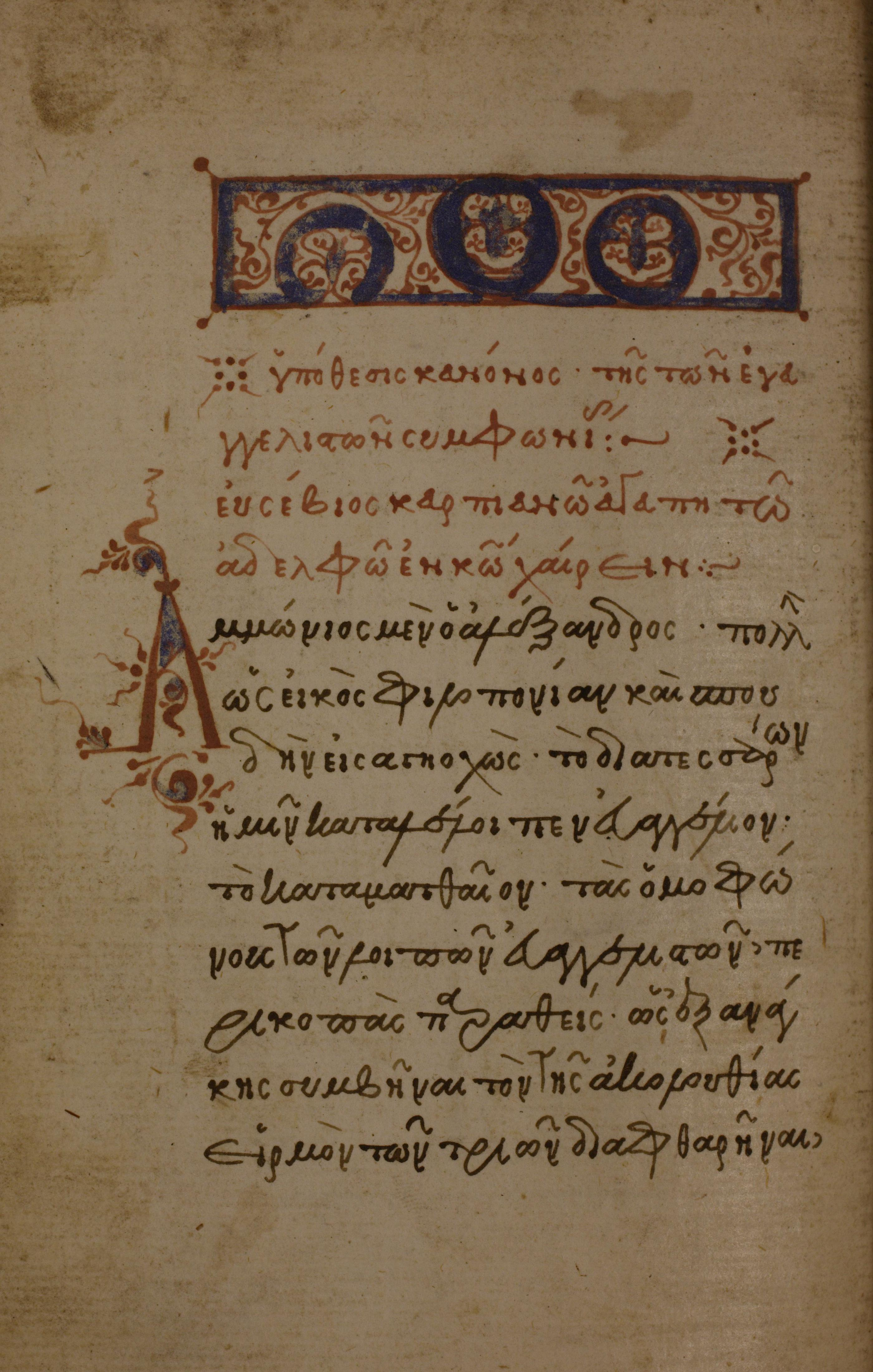
- The first page of Matthew with the decorated headpiece and "hypothesis" (in red)
- Text: Gospels
- Date: 1430
- Script: Greek
- Now at: University of Michigan
- Size: 19.6 cm by 14 cm
- Type: Byzantine text-type / mixed
- Category: none
- Hand: neatly written
- Note: marginalia

Minuscule 545 (in the Gregory-Aland numbering), ε 511 (in Soden's numbering), is a Greek minuscule manuscript of the New Testament, on paper. It is dated by a colophon to the year 1430. Scrivener labeled it by number 558. It is housed at the University of Michigan. It has marginalia.

== Description ==
The codex contains the text of the four Gospels, on a total of 430 paper leaves having a size of (19.6 cm by 14 cm). The text is written in one column per page, 16 lines per page. According to Scrivener, "the leaves are much misplaced in binding". Breathings and accents are regular. The text was revised by the first hand, but a later hand corrected this revision in several places.

The text is divided according to the κεφαλαια (chapters), whose numerals are given at the margin, and the τιτλοι (titles of chapters) at the top and bottom (not in Matthew). There is also a division according to the smaller Ammonian Sections, references to the Eusebian Canons (written below Ammonian Section numbers). At the end of each Gospel are given numbers of Verses.

It contains the Epistula ad Carpianum, Prolegomena, tables of the Eusebian Canons, lists of the κεφαλαια (lists of contents) before every Gospel, "hypothesis" – explanatory of using of the Eusebian Canons (only in Matthew), and pictures of the four Evangelists, of the Saviour, and of the Virgin and Child. A few church lessons are set at the margin. The nomina sacra are contracted in a usual way.

Errors

Iota adscript occurs 17 times up to Luke 1:77, then ceases, but iota subscript first in Luke 1:77 (in the same hand and on same page as the last adscriptum) thence found 85 times, mostly with article after the proposition εν.

Errors of iotacism are 398 (the first hand), some of them were corrected sometimes by a later hand. Scrivener enumerated all errors of the first hand: ω for ο (64), ο for ω (56), ει for η (43), η for ει (75), η for ι (18), ι for η (22), αι for ε (30), ει for ι (9), ι for ει (11), η for υ (6), υ for η (6), ει for υ (2), υ for ει (only 1, in Matthew 12:48), υ for ι (3), ι for υ (2), ου for ο (1), ω for ου (4), ου for ω (7), η for ευ (in Luke 5:7 - ?), υ for ου (1), ι for οι (1), οι for ι (1), η for οι (3).

There are nine omissions by homoioteleuton (Matthew 13:12; Luke 10:27; 11:10; 17:33; 22:30; John 4:14; 8:24; 14:7.27).

N εφελκυστικον occurs 17 times (thrice corrected).

The only Alexandrian form is χειραν in John 20:25.

== Text ==
The Greek text of the codex is mixed with a predominant element of the Byzantine text-type. According to Hermann von Soden it belongs to I^{r}, the most diluted form of the Iota text-type, along with codices 262, 1187, 1666, and 1573. The Greek text of the codex Aland did not place in any Category. According to the Claremont Profile Method it creates textual cluster with 585, in Luke 1; Luke 10; Luke 20. It is a core member of this cluster. It has an unusual readings in Mark 6:22; Luke 2:22; 14:4; 15:21; John 7:8; 10:11.

Textual variants

The words before the bracket is the reading of the Textus Receptus.

Matthew 4:22 — αυτω (him) ] τω ι̅υ̅ (for son)
Matthew 5:18 — γαρ (for) ] αμην (truly)
Matthew 8:13 — none ] και υποστρεψας ο εκατον εις τον οικον αυτου ευρε τον παιδα υγιαινοντα
Matthew 9:11 — εσθιει (eat) ] εσθιει και πινει (eat and drink)
Mark 2:10 — εξουσιαν εχει ο υιος του ανθρωπου αφιεναι ] εχει εξουσιαν επι της γης αφιεναι
Luke 6:22 — αυτης (her) ] αυτου (him)
Mark 2:22 — αυτης (her) ] αυτου (him)
Luke 10:27 — και εξ ολης της ισχυος σου ] omitted
Luke 14:4 — ονος ] υιος
Luke 15:21 — none ] ποιησον με ως ενα των μισθιων σου
John 7:8 — ουκ ] ουπω
John 1:13.19.26.34.51; 2:3.12.13.16.18; 3:20.21.28.36; 4:1.2.3.14.33.46; 5:1.44; 6:10.11.17.21.30.49.51.55.61.64.71; 7:4.8.31.46.47; 8:36.41.43.52; etc.

== History ==
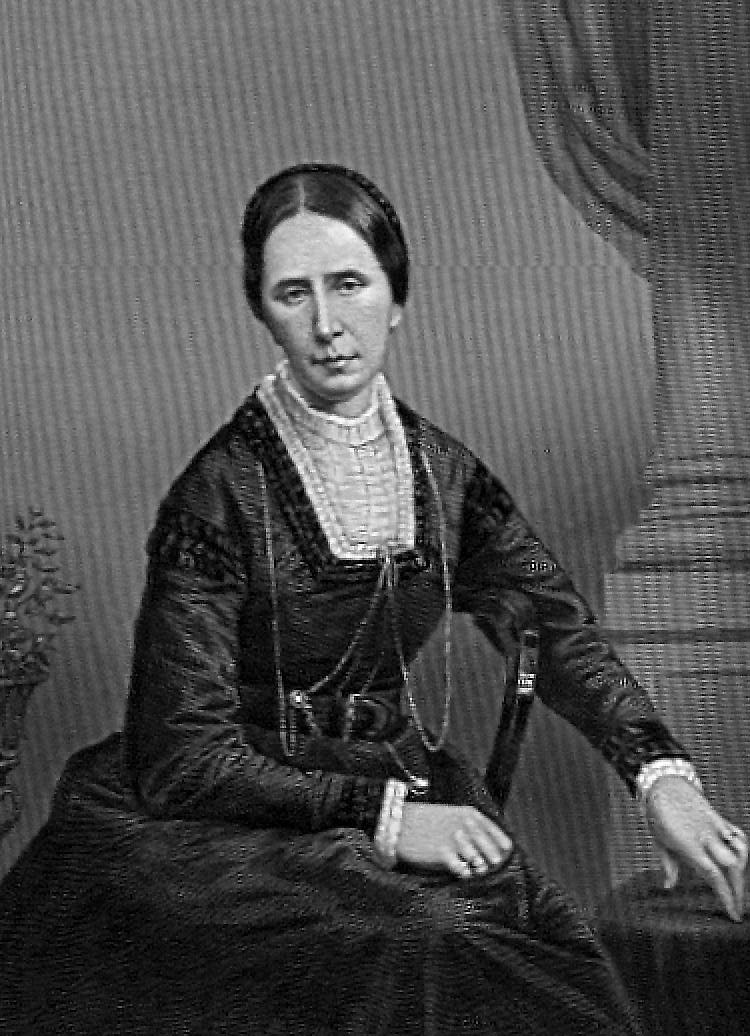
The Lady Burdett-Coutts

According to the colophon the manuscript was written by Theodoros, a scribe, in the year of the world 6938, meaning A.D. 1439. The colophon states: Παρ εμοι του ευτελους και αβρωτιμου παντων μεροπων και χωρικου γραφεως θεοδορου του κοτζα εκ χωρας μετωνης τελειωτεν εν ετει συστασεως κοσμου ς λη. Ιν. Η. Απο δε της ενσαρκου οικονομιας αυλ μηνι μαιω λα.

Location

In 1864, the manuscript was in the possession of a dealer at Janina in Epeiros. It was then purchased from him by a representative of Baroness Burdett-Coutts (1814–1906), a philanthropist, together with other Greek manuscripts (among them codices 532-546). They were transported to England in 1870–1871.

The manuscript was presented by Burdett-Coutts to Sir Roger Cholmely's School, and was housed at the Highgate (Burdett-Coutts III. 10), in London. In 1922 it was acquired for the University of Michigan. It is currently housed at the University of Michigan (Ms. 30) in Ann Arbor.

Examination

It was added to the list of the New Testament manuscripts by F. H. A. Scrivener (558) and C. R. Gregory (545). Gregory saw it in 1883.

Scrivener examined, described and collated its text. His collation was edited posthumously in Adversaria critica sacra in 1893.

== Gallery ==
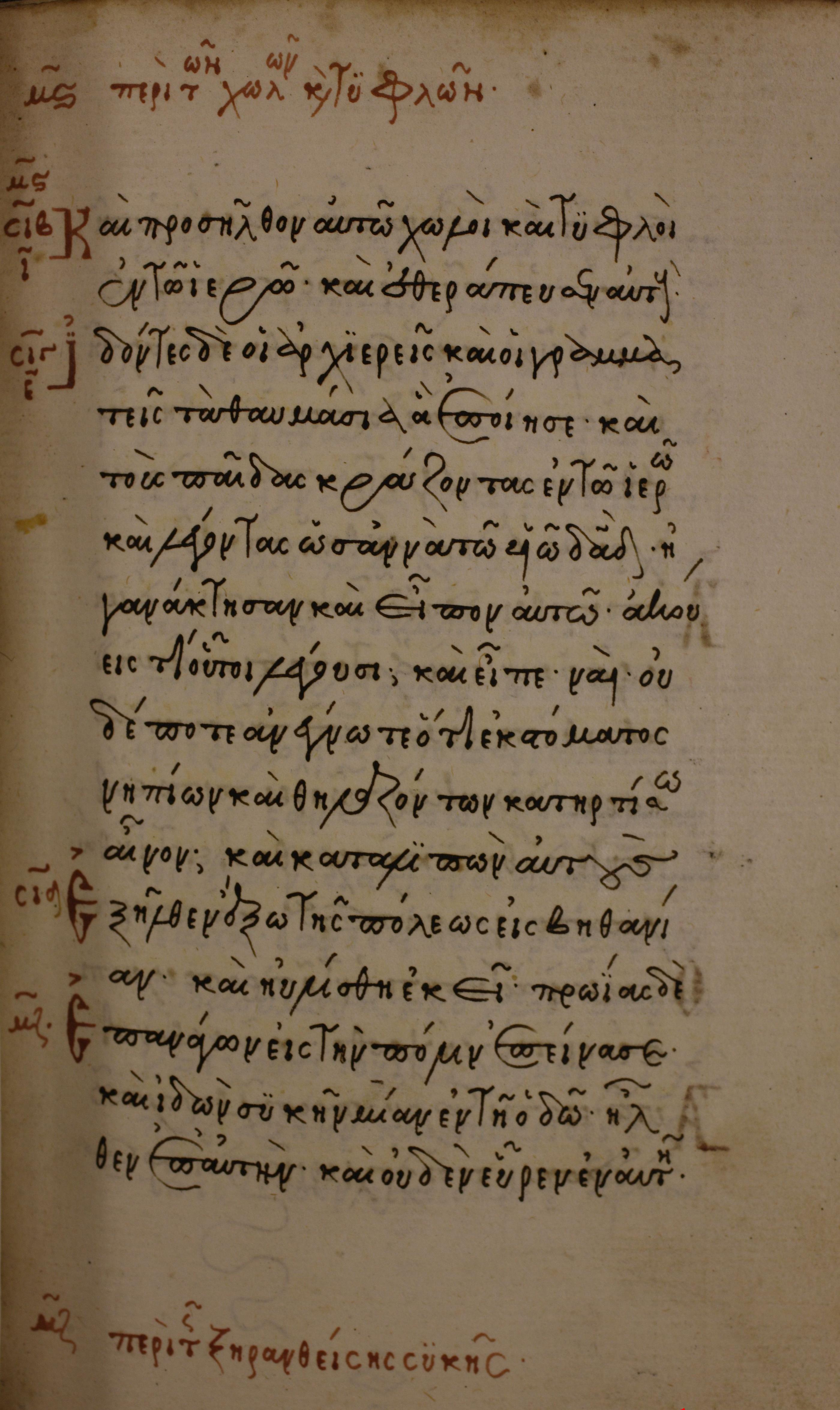
τιτλοι at the top and bottom

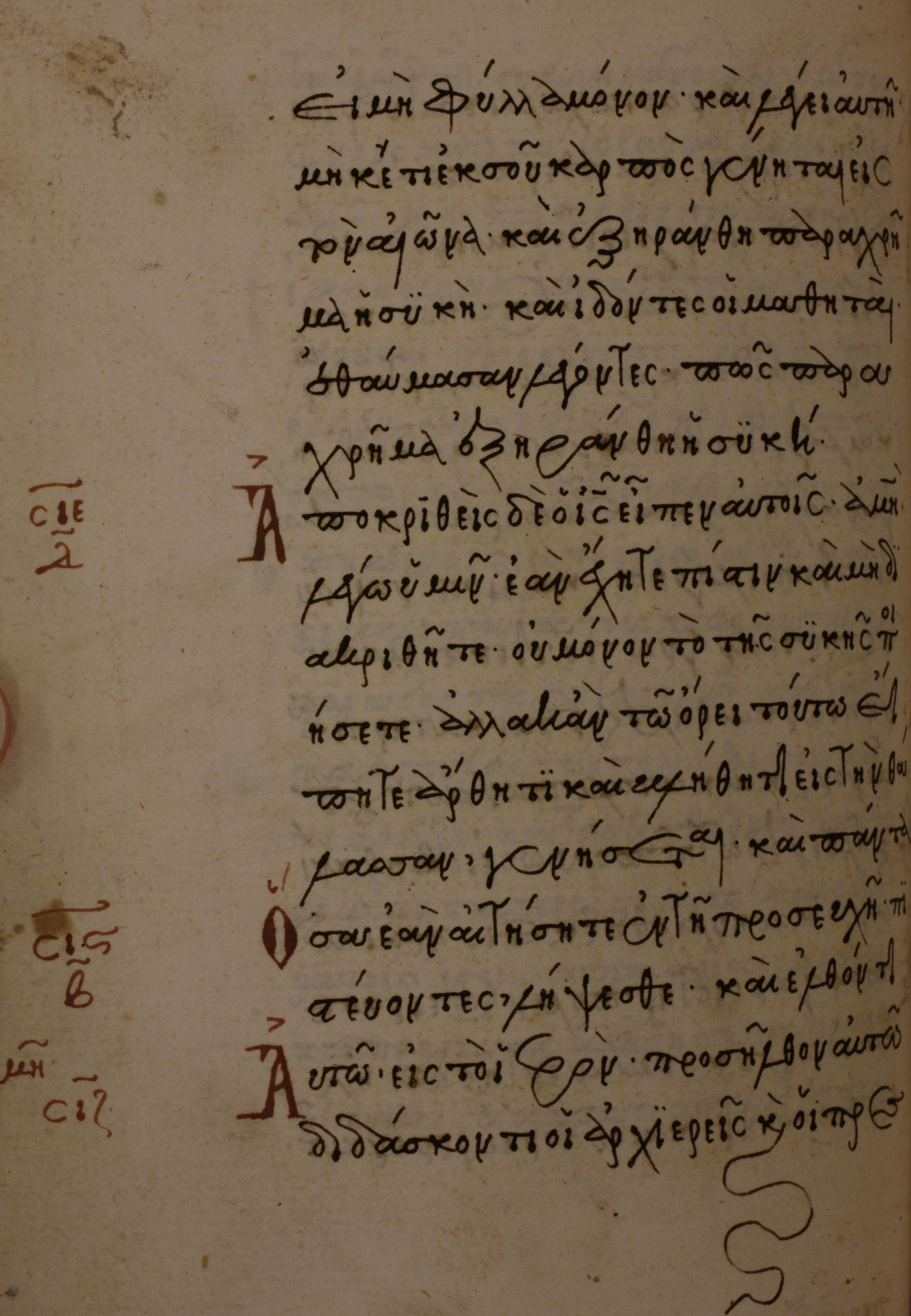
Page from Matthew, beautiful calligraphy, references to the Eusebian Canons

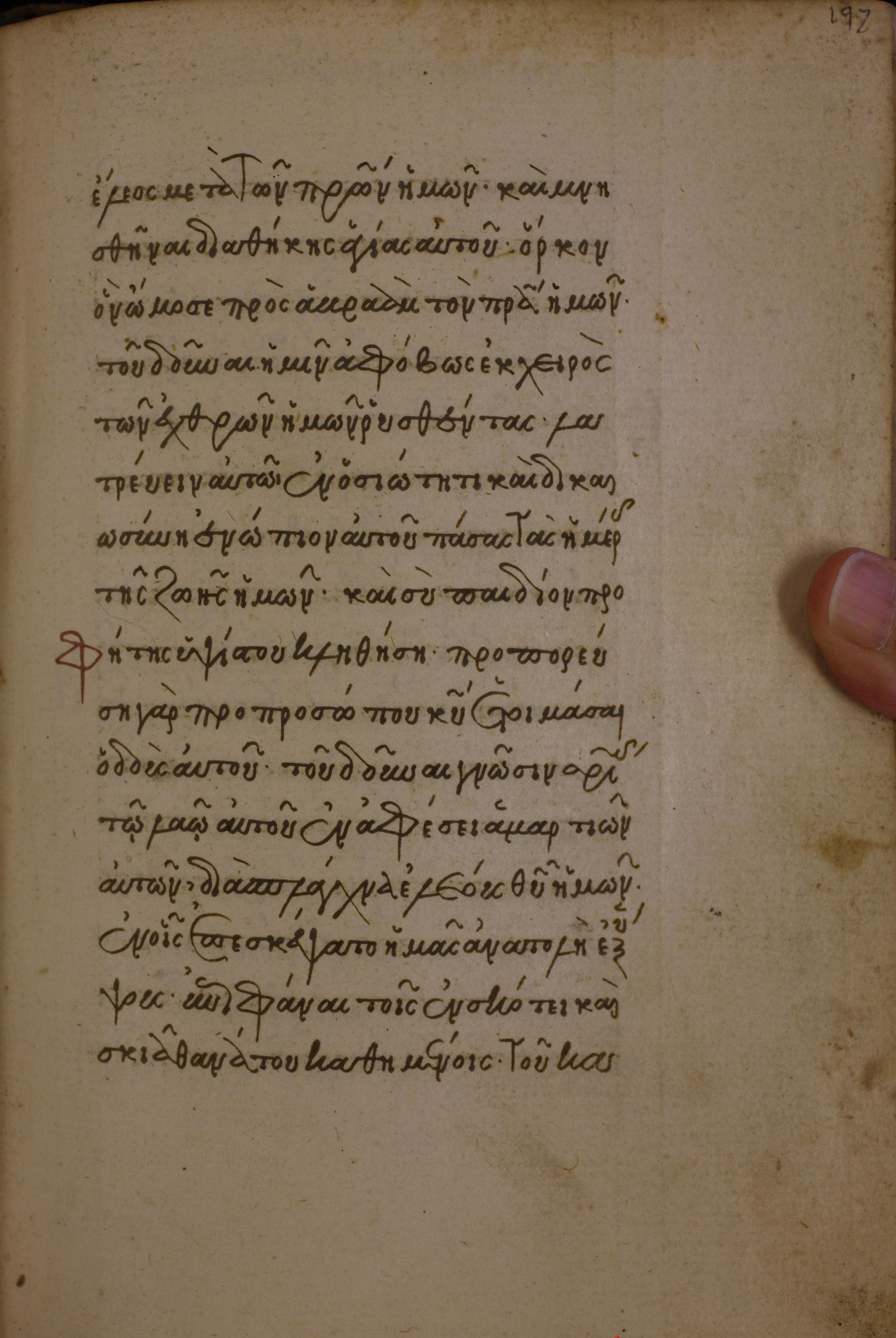
Folio 197 r, with text Luke 1:72-79, first using of iota subscript (12th line — τῳ λαῳ)

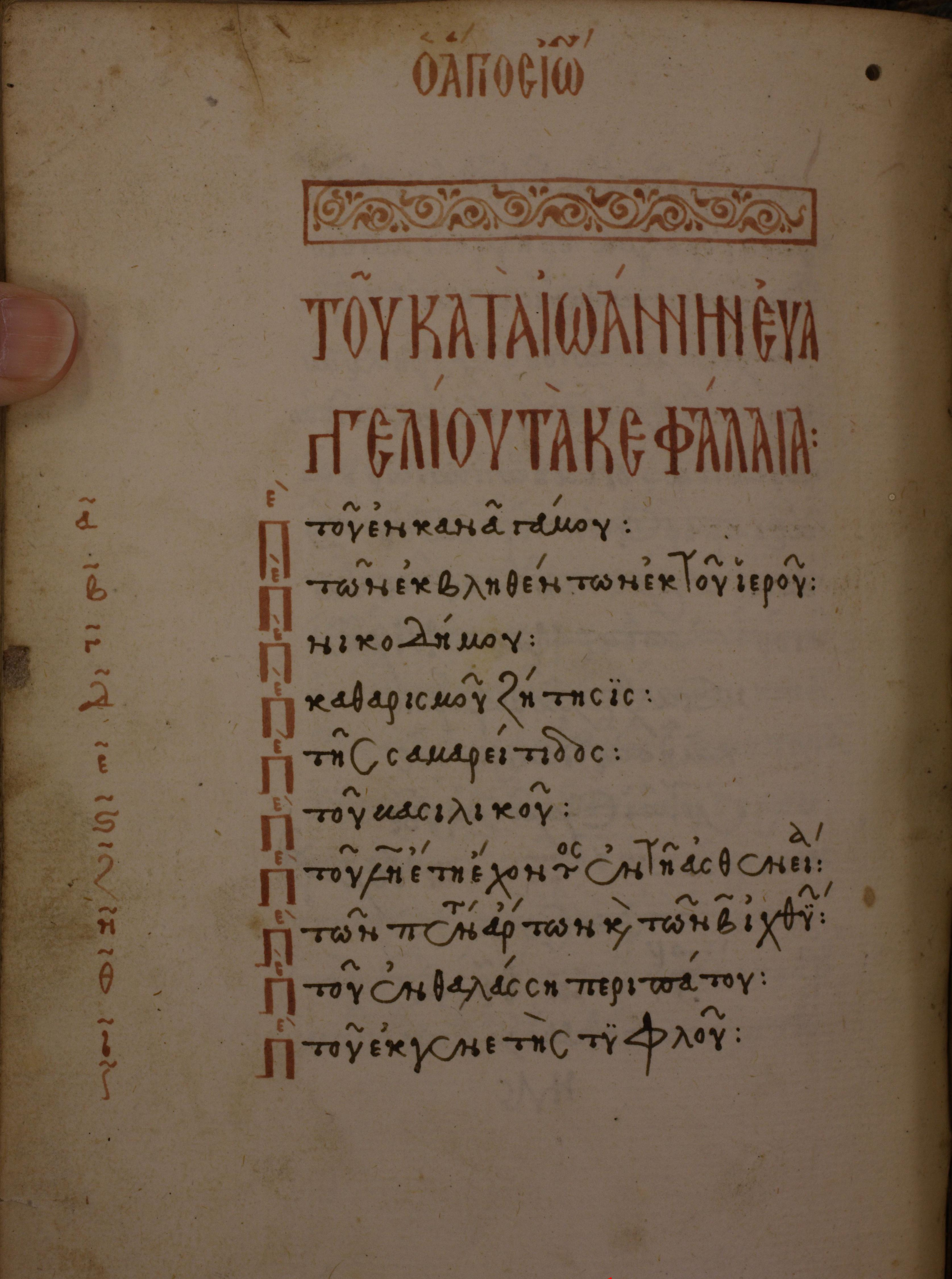
Table of κεφαλαια to the Gospel of John (f. 303 v.)

== See also ==
- List of New Testament minuscules
- Biblical manuscript
- Textual criticism
