= Minuscule 519 =

- New Testament manuscript
- Text: Gospels
- Date: 13th century
- Script: Greek
- Now at: Christ Church, Oxford
- Size: 14.7 cm by 11.7 cm
- Type: Byzantine text-type
- Category: V
- Note: incomplete marginalia

Minuscule 519 (in the Gregory-Aland numbering), ε 343 (in the Soden numbering), is a Greek minuscule manuscript of the New Testament, on parchment. Palaeographically it has been assigned to the 13th century. Scrivener labelled it by number 505. The manuscript is lacunose.

== Description ==
The codex contains the complete text of the four Gospels on 308 parchment leaves (size 14.7 cm by 11.7 cm) with only one lacuna (Matthew 16:2-17). The text is written in one column per page, 17-24 lines per page.

The text is divided according to the κεφαλαια (chapters), whose numbers are given at the margin, and some τιτλοι (titles of chapters) at the top of the pages. The is no another division according to the Ammonian Sections with references to the Eusebian Canons.

It contains prolegomena, the tables of the κεφαλαια (tables of contents) before each Gospel, subscriptions at the end of each Gospel, and numbered στιχοι.

== Text ==
The Greek text of the codex is a representative of the Byzantine text-type. Hermann von Soden included it to the K^{x} group. Aland placed it in Category V.

According to the Claremont Profile Method it represents K^{x} in Luke 1 and Luke 20. In Luke 10 no profile was made.

== History ==
The manuscript was written by several hands. In 1727 the manuscript came from Constantinople to England and was presented to archbishop of Canterbury, William Wake, together with the manuscripts 73, 74, 506-520. Wake presented it to Christ Church in Oxford.

The manuscript was added to the list of New Testament minuscule manuscripts by F. H. A. Scrivener (505) and C. R. Gregory (519). Gregory saw it in 1883.

It is currently housed at Christ Church (Wake 39) in Oxford.

== See also ==
- List of New Testament minuscules
- Biblical manuscript
- Textual criticism
