= Minuscule 535 =

- New Testament manuscript
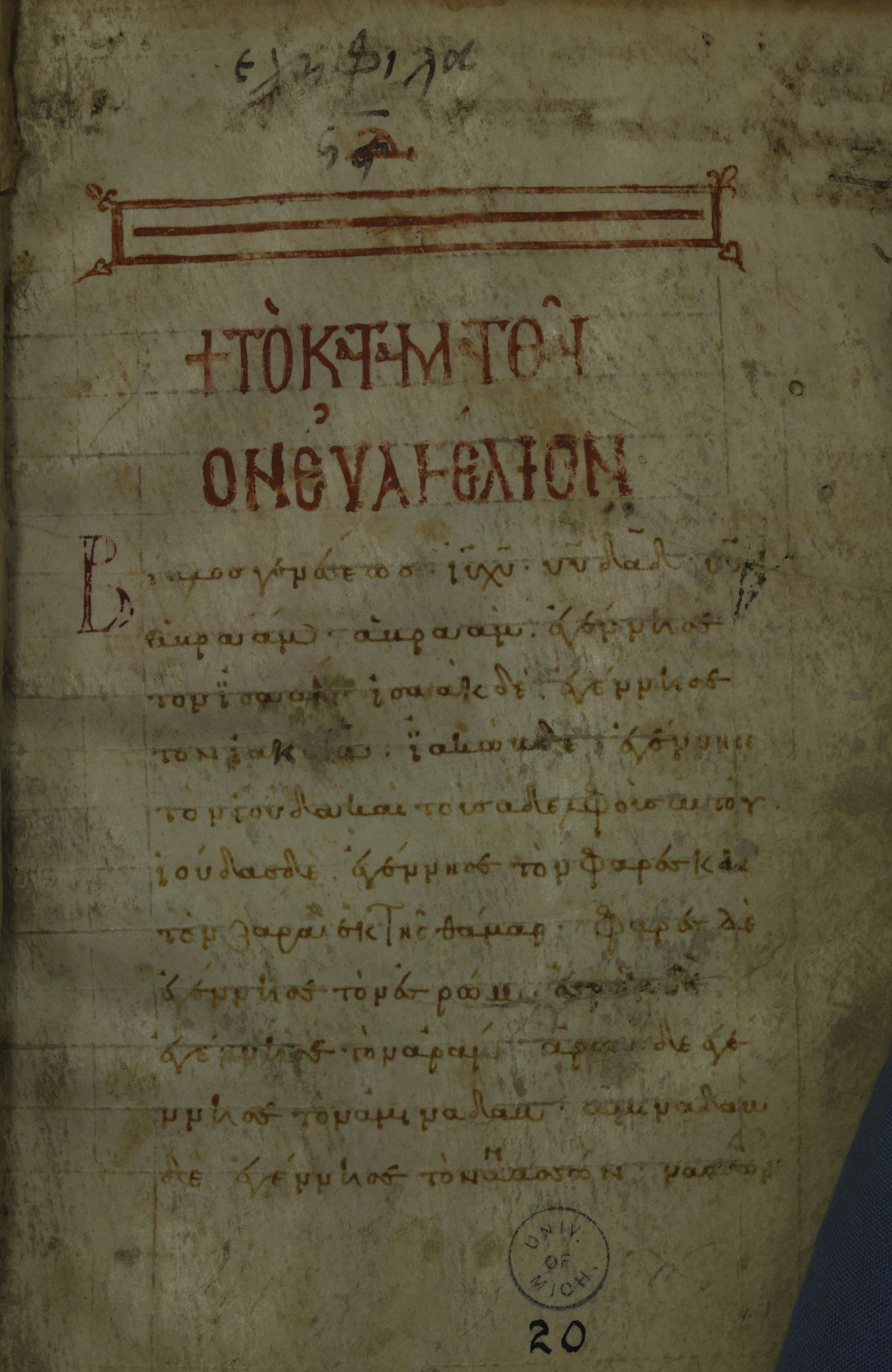
- The first page of Matthew
- Text: Gospel of Matthew, Gospel of Mark
- Date: 12th century
- Script: Greek
- Now at: University of Michigan
- Size: 17.5 cm by 13.8 cm
- Type: Byzantine text-type
- Category: V
- Note: full marginalia

Minuscule 535 (in the Gregory-Aland numbering), 548 (Scrivener), ε 140 (in Soden's numbering), is a Greek minuscule manuscript of the New Testament, on a parchment, dated to the 12th century. It was adapted for liturgical use, with full marginalia.

The manuscript is very lacunose.

== Description ==
The codex contains an incomplete text of the Gospel of Matthew, Gospel of Mark on 125 parchment leaves (size 17.5 cm by 13.8 cm) with some lacunae (Matthew 11:28-13:33; 18:13-21:15; 21:33-22:10; 24:46-25:22; Mark 3:11-5:31). The text is written in one column per page, 18 lines per page.

The text is divided according to the κεφαλαια (chapters), whose numbers are given at the margin, with their τιτλοι (titles of chapters) at the top of the pages. There is also a division according to the smaller Ammonian Sections (in Mark 233 Sections - the last in 16:8), whose numbers are given at the margin, with references to the Eusebian Canons (written below Ammonian Section numbers). It contains a lectionary markings at the margin (for liturgical use), incipits, Synaxarion, and Menologion.

== Text ==
The Greek text of the codex is a representative of the Byzantine text-type. Aland placed it in Category V.

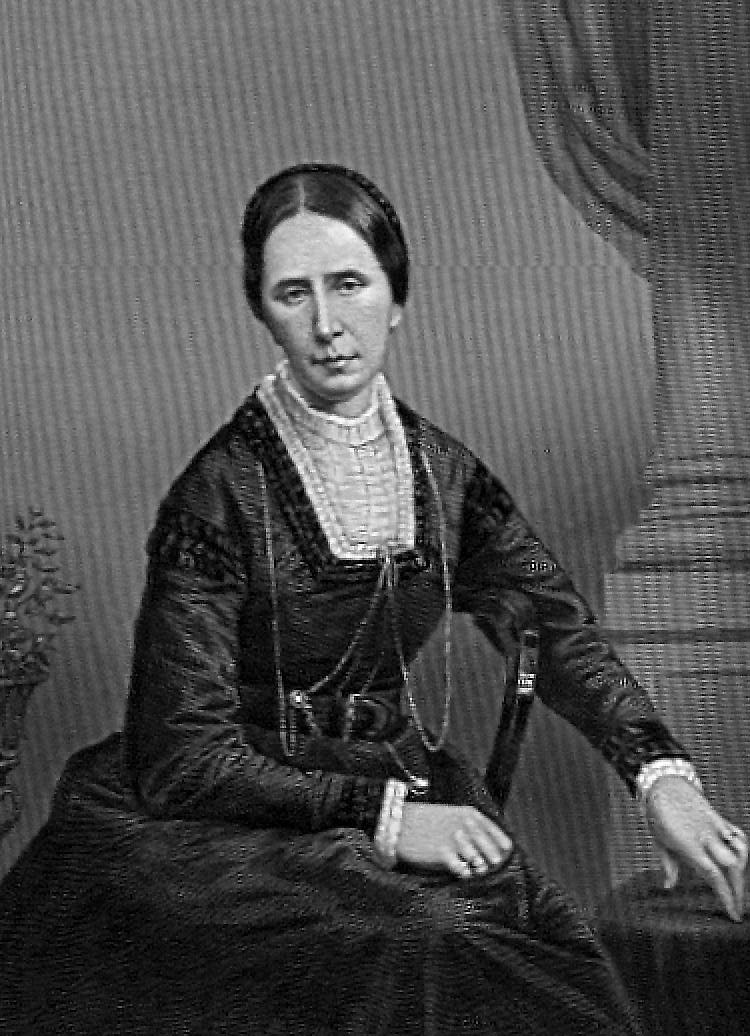
The Lady Burdett-Coutts

== History ==
The manuscript is dated by the INTF on the palaeographical ground to the 11th century.

In 1864 the manuscript was purchased from a dealer at Janina in Epeiros, by Baroness Burdett-Coutts (1814-1906), a philanthropist, together with other Greek manuscripts (among them codices 532-546). They were transported to England in 1870–1871. All collection was presented by Burdett-Coutts to Sir Roger Cholmely's School.

It was added to the list of the New Testament manuscripts by F. H. A. Scrivener (548) and C. R. Gregory (535). Gregory saw it in 1883.

Formerly the manuscript was housed at the Highgate (Burdett-Coutts 1. 9), in London.

It was examined and collated by Scrivener.

It is currently housed at the University of Michigan (Ms. 20) in Ann Arbor.

== See also ==
- List of New Testament minuscules
- Biblical manuscript
- Textual criticism
