= Minuscule 577 =

- New Testament manuscript
- Text: Gospels
- Date: 1346
- Script: Greek
- Now at: University of Montpellier
- Size: 15.1 cm by 11.3 cm
- Type: Byzantine
- Category: V

Minuscule 577 (in the Gregory-Aland numbering), ε 454 (in the Soden numbering), is a Greek minuscule manuscript of the New Testament, on paper. It is dated by a colophon to the year 1346. Scrivener labelled it by 871. The manuscript has complex contents.

== Description ==
The codex contains the text of the four Gospels on 259 paper leaves (size 15.1 cm by 11.3 cm). The writing is in one column per page, 23 lines per page.

The text is divided according to the κεφαλαια (chapters), whose numerals are given at the margin, and their τιτλοι (titles) at the top of the pages. There is also a division according to the shorter Ammonian Sections (in Mark 232 sections - the last Section in 16:6), with references to the Eusebian Canons.

It contains Epistula ad Carpianum, Eusebian tables, Prolegomena, tables of the κεφαλαια (tables of contents) are placed before every Gospel, liturgical books with hagiographies (Synaxarion and Menologion), subscriptions at the end of each Gospel, with numbers of στιχοι.

== Text ==
The Greek text of the codex is a representative of the Byzantine text-type. Hermann von Soden classified it to the textual family K^{x}. Aland placed it in Category V. According to the Claremont Profile Method it represents mixed Byzantine text in Luke 1, Luke 10, and Luke 20. It is creates textual cluster with the codex 545 in Luke 1 and with codex 1519 in Luke 20.

It has some unusual readings.

== History ==
The manuscript was written by Gregorius, a scribe. It once belonged to Bénigne Bouhier (1635—1703) and his son Jean Bouhier (1673—1746).

Scrivener labelled it by 871.

The manuscript was examined and described by Léopold Victor Delisle.

Currently the manuscript is housed at the library of the University of Montpellier (Sect. Medecine, H. 446) in Montpellier.

== See also ==
- List of New Testament minuscules
- Biblical manuscript
- Textual criticism
