= Minuscule 533 =

- New Testament manuscript
- Text: Gospels †
- Date: 13th century
- Script: Greek
- Now at: University of Michigan
- Size: 16.6 cm by 13.6 cm
- Type: Byzantine text-type
- Category: V
- Note: incomplete marginalia

Minuscule 533 (in the Gregory-Aland numbering), ε 256 (in Soden's numbering), is a Greek minuscule manuscript of the New Testament, on a parchment, dated to the 13th century. It was adapted for liturgical use; marginalia are incomplete.

Scrivener labelled it by number 546. The manuscript is lacunose.

== Description ==
The codex contains an incomplete text of the four Gospels on 237 parchment leaves (size 16.6 cm by 13.6 cm) with some lacunae (Matthew 1:1-9:13; Luke 1:1-15; John 21:1-16). The text is written in one column per page, 20 lines per page.

The text is divided according to the κεφαλαια (chapters), whose numbers are given at the margin, and their τιτλοι (titles of chapters) at the top of the pages. There is also a division according to the smaller Ammonian Sections (in Mark 241 Sections - the last in 16:20), but without references to the Eusebian Canons.

The tables of the κεφαλαια (tables of contents) are placed before each Gospel. It contains lectionary markings at the margin (for liturgical use), incipits, and iambic verses.

== Text ==
The Greek text of the codex is a representative of the Byzantine text-type. Hermann von Soden classified it to the textual family K^{x}. Aland placed it in Category V.

According to the Claremont Profile Method it represents textual cluster 121 in Luke 1 (fragmentary), Luke 10, and Luke 20. Wisse did not assign cluster 121 to the family K^{x}.

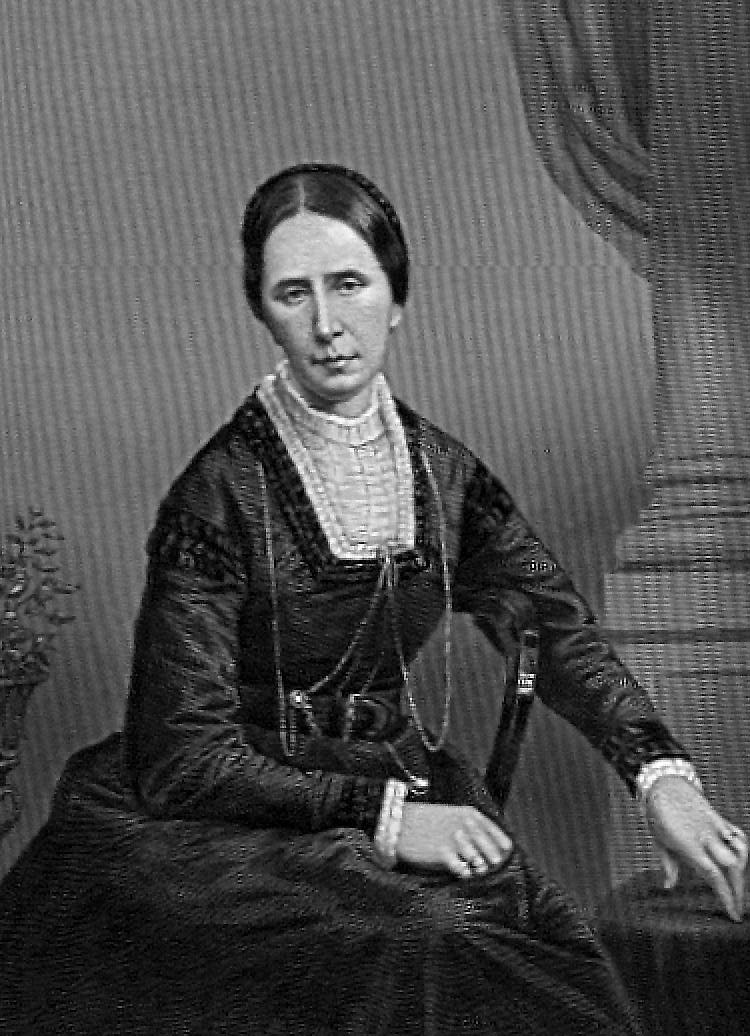
The Lady Burdett-Coutts

== History ==
The manuscript is dated by the INTF on the palaeographical ground to the 13th century.

In 1864 the manuscript was purchased from a dealer at Janina in Epeiros, by Baroness Burdett-Coutts (1814-1906), a philanthropist, together with other Greek manuscripts (among them codices 532-546). They were transported to England in 1870-1871. All collection of manuscripts was presented by Burdett-Coutts to Sir Roger Cholmely's School.

The manuscript was added to the minuscule manuscripts of the New Testament by F. H. A. Scrivener (546) and C. R. Gregory (533). Gregory saw it in 1883.

Formerly the manuscript was housed at the Highgate (Burdett-Coutts 1. 4), in London. It was examined by Scrivener.

It is currently housed at the University of Michigan (Ms. 21) in Ann Arbor.

== See also ==
- List of New Testament minuscules
- Biblical manuscript
- Textual criticism
