= Minuscule 538 =

- New Testament manuscript
- Text: Gospels †
- Date: 12th century
- Script: Greek
- Now at: University of Michigan
- Size: 15.2 cm by 11 cm
- Type: Byzantine text-type, K^{x}
- Category: V
- Hand: neatly written
- Note: marginalia

Minuscule 538 (in the Gregory-Aland numbering), ε 335 (von Soden), is a Greek minuscule manuscript of the New Testament on a parchment. Dated palaeographically to the 12th or 13th century. Formerly it was labelled as W^{d} and 552 (Scrivener). The manuscript is lacunose. It was adapted for liturgical use.

== Description ==
The codex contains the text of the four Gospels, on 212 parchment leaves (15.2 cm by 11 cm) with some lacunae (Matthew 1:1-12:41; 15:14-30; Mark 14:9-20; John 1:1-15). It is written in one column per page, 24 lines per page in minuscule letters. The letters are neatly written.

The text is divided according to the κεφαλαια (chapters), whose numbers are given at the margin, and their τιτλοι (titles of chapters) at the top of the pages. There is also a division according to the Ammonian Sections (in Mark 241 Sections - the last in 16:20), with references to the Eusebian Canons (written at the margin below Ammonian Section numbers).

The tables of the κεφαλαια (tables of contents) are placed before each Gospel, portrait of the Saint Mark, It contains lectionary markings at the margin (for liturgical use), Menologion (fragments), and subscriptions at the end of each Gospel, with numbers of stichoi. The manuscript was bound and numbered later.

Some leaves were cut in a trapezoidal shape. Gospel order is mixed with various leaves misplaced in other areas of the manuscript (folio 153 recto has John 1:15).

== Text ==
The Greek text of the codex is a representative of the Byzantine text-type. Hermann von Soden classified it as a member of the textual family K^{x}. In Mark and Luke it closer to K^{1}. Aland placed it in Category V. The manuscript has some non-Byzantine elements. It has some textual affinities to the early versions of the Gospels. According to the Claremont Profile Method it represents the textual family K^{x} in Luke 1 and Luke 20. In Luke 10 it has mixed Byzantine text.

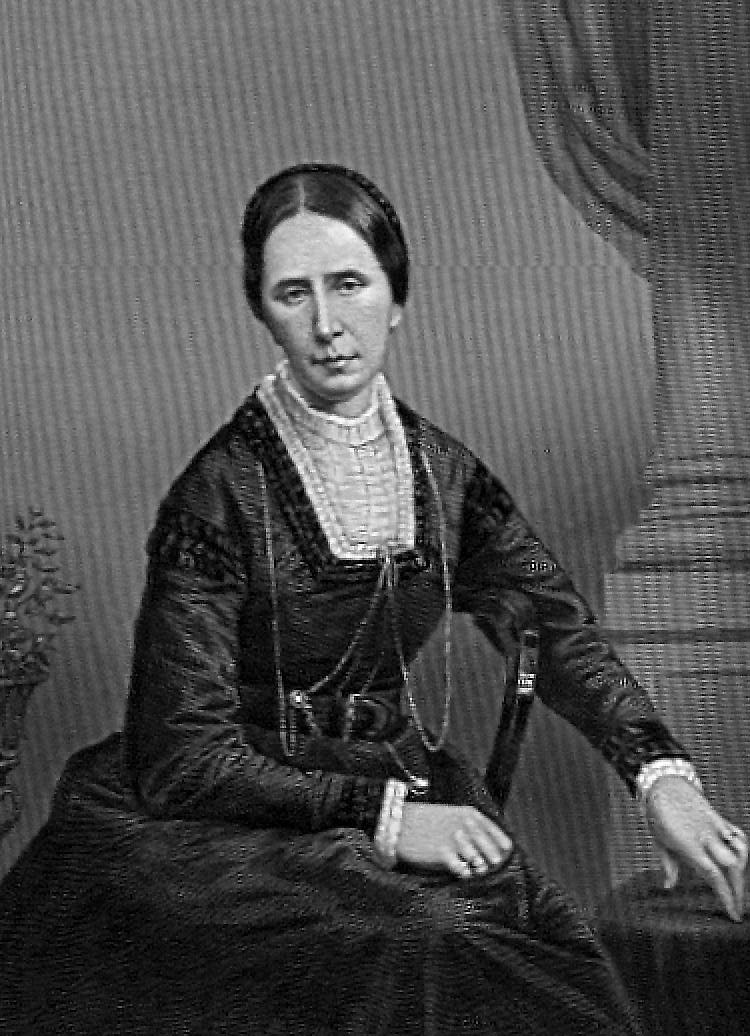
The Lady Burdett-Coutts

== History ==
The manuscript was brought from Janina (Epirus) between 1870 and 1872 together with the codices 532-546 and bought by Baroness Burdett-Coutts (1814-1906), a philanthropist. It was presented by Burdett-Coutts to Sir Roger Cholmely's School, and was housed at the Highgate (Burdett-Coutts II. 18), in London.

It was added to the list of the New Testament manuscripts by F. H. A. Scrivener (552) and C. R. Gregory (538). Gregory saw it in 1883.

The manuscript was examined and collated by Scrivener in his Adversaria critica sacra.

Currently the codex is housed at the University of Michigan (Ms. 18), in Ann Arbor.

== See also ==
- List of New Testament minuscules
- Textual criticism
- Biblical manuscript
