= Minuscule 600 =

- New Testament manuscript
- Text: Gospels
- Date: 14th century
- Script: Greek
- Now at: Biblioteca Marciana
- Size: 32.8 cm by 24.5 cm
- Type: Byzantine text-type
- Category: V

Minuscule 600 is a Greek minuscule manuscript of the New Testament Gospels, written on paper. It is designated by the siglum 600 in the Gregory-Aland numbering of New Testament manuscripts, and Z^{ε599} in the von Soden numbering of New Testament manuscripts. Using the study of comparative writing styles (palaeography), it has been dated to the 14th century. The manuscript has complex contents. It was formerly labelled by biblical scholar Frederick H. A. Scrivener as 463.

== Description ==
The manuscript is a codex (precursor to the modern book format), containing the complete text of the New Testament Gospels, made of 430 paper leaves (sized 32.8 cm by 24.5 cm). The text is written in one column per page, 31 lines per page, with the main Gospel text in excerpts with the commentary of Euthymius Zigabenus in between. Interestingly, though it is divided according to the chapters (known as κεφαλαια / kephalaia), whose numbers are given in the margin, and their titles (known as τιτλοι / titloi) written at the top of the pages, it only contains the content table list (also known as κεφαλαια) before the Gospel of John.

== Text ==
The Greek text of the codex is considered to be a representative of the Byzantine text-type. Biblical scholar Kurt Aland placed it in Category V of his New Testament manuscript classification system. Category V manuscripts are described as "manuscripts with a purely or predominantly Byzantine text." It was not examined by using the Claremont Profile Method (a specific analysis of textual data).

== History ==
The earliest history of the manuscript is unknown. It was added to the list of New Testament manuscripts by Scrivener. Biblical scholar Caspar René Gregory saw the manuscript in 1886.

It is currently dated by the INTF to the 14th century. It is presently housed at the Biblioteca Marciana (shelf number Gr. II,7 (979)), in Venice.

== See also ==
- List of New Testament minuscules
- Biblical manuscript
- Textual criticism
- Minuscule 599
- Minuscule 601
