= Minuscule 598 =

- New Testament manuscript
- Text: Gospel of Luke
- Date: 13th century
- Script: Greek
- Now at: Biblioteca Marciana
- Size: 43 cm by 28 cm
- Type: ?
- Category: none

Minuscule 598 (in the Gregory-Aland numbering), A^{ν31}Ν^{λ35} (von Soden), is a Greek minuscule manuscript of the New Testament, on paper. Palaeographically it has been assigned to the 13th century. The manuscript has complex contents. It was labeled by Scrivener as 466.

== Description ==
The codex contains the text of the Gospel of Luke on 58 paper leaves (size 43 cm by 28 cm). The text is written in two columns per page, 50-74 lines per page. It contains also a commentary and various Patristic matter. All codex has 320 leaves.

== Text ==
Aland did not place the Greek text of the codex in any Category. It was not examined by using the Claremont Profile Method.

== History ==
The manuscript was added to the list of New Testament manuscripts by Scrivener. It was examined by Dean Burgon. Gregory saw it in 1886.

The manuscript currently is housed at the Biblioteca Marciana (Gr. Z. 494 (331), fol. 1-58), at Venice.

== See also ==
- List of New Testament minuscules
- Biblical manuscript
- Textual criticism
