= Minuscule 528 =

- New Testament manuscript
- Text: Gospels
- Date: 11th century
- Script: Greek
- Now at: Bodleian Library
- Size: 20.5 cm by 15 cm
- Type: Byzantine text-type
- Category: V
- Hand: fairly written

Minuscule 528 (in the Gregory-Aland numbering), ε 148 (in Soden's numbering), is a Greek minuscule manuscript of the New Testament, on a parchment. Palaeographically it has been assigned to the 11th century. Scrivener labelled it by number 483.

== Description ==
The codex contains a complete text of the four Gospels on 354 parchment leaves (size 20.5 cm by 15 cm). It is written in one column per page, 20 lines per page.

The text is divided according to the κεφαλαια (chapters), whose numbers are given at the margin, and their τιτλοι (titles of chapters) at the top of the pages. There is also a division according to the Ammonian Sections (in Mark 234 Sections, the last Section in 16:9) with references to the Eusebian Canons.

It contains the Epistula ad Carpianum, Eusebian tables, the tables of the κεφαλαια (tables of contents) are placed before every Gospel, It contains lectionary markings at the margin, incipits, Synaxarion at the end, and portraits of the Evangelists.

It has also a few lectionary markings added by a later hand.

== Text ==
The Greek text of the codex is a representative of the Byzantine text-type. Hermann von Soden classified it to the textual family K^{x}. Aland placed it in Category V. According to the Claremont Profile Method it represents the textual family K^{x} in Luke 1 and Luke 20. In Luke 10 no profile was made.

== History ==
In 1727 the manuscript was brought from the Pantokrator monastery on Mount Athos to England. The manuscript was collated by Th. Mangey, Prebendary of Durham.

The manuscript was added to the list of New Testament minuscule manuscripts by F. H. A. Scrivener (483) and C. R. Gregory (528). Gregory saw it in 1883.

It is currently housed at the Bodleian Library (MS. Cromwell 16) in Oxford.

== See also ==
- List of New Testament minuscules
- Biblical manuscript
- Textual criticism
