= Minuscule 591 =

- New Testament manuscript
- Text: Gospels, commentary
- Date: 13th century
- Script: Greek
- Now at: Accademia Nazionale dei Lincei
- Size: 29.8 cm by 24 cm
- Type: ?
- Category: none

Minuscule 591 (in the Gregory-Aland numbering), A^{300} (von Soden), is a Greek minuscule manuscript of the New Testament, on parchment. Palaeographically it has been assigned to the 13th century. The manuscript has complex contents. It was labelled by Scrivener as 883.

== Description ==
The codex contains a complete text of the four Gospels on 220 parchment leaves (size 29.8 cm by 24 cm). The text is written in one column per page, 24 lines per page for biblical text, and 42 lines per page for a commentary.

It contains tables of the κεφαλαια are given before each Gospel, numbers of the κεφαλαια at the left margin, the τιτλοι with the harmony, and subscriptions at the end. The biblical text is surrounded by a commentary (catena).

== Text ==
The Greek text of the codex Aland did not place in any Category V. The text of the manuscript was not examined by using Wisse's Profile Method. In result the textual character of the codex is unknown.

== History ==
The manuscript was held in the monastery of John Thersiti in Calabria, the monastery was "caput monasterium ordinis Basiliuni".

The manuscript was added to the list of the New Testament manuscripts by Gregory, who saw it in 1886.

The manuscript currently is housed at the library of the Accademia Nazionale dei Lincei (Corsin 24 (41. G. 16)), at Rome.

== See also ==
- List of New Testament minuscules
- Biblical manuscript
- Textual criticism
