= Minuscule 599 =

Greek manuscript (15th century)

- New Testament manuscript
- Text: Gospels
- Date: 15th century
- Script: Greek
- Now at: Biblioteca Marciana
- Size: 40.4 cm by 29.3 cm
- Type: ?
- Category: none
- Note: marginalia

Minuscule 599 (in the Gregory-Aland numbering), A^{599} (von Soden), is a Greek minuscule manuscript of the New Testament, on paper. Palaeographically it has been assigned to the 15th century. The manuscript has complex contents. It was labelled by Scrivener as 467. It has marginalia.

== Description ==
The codex contains the text of the four Gospels on 441 paper leaves (size 40.4 cm by 29.3 cm). The text is written in one column per page, 42 lines per page. It contains lists of the κεφαλαια, numerals of the κεφαλαια (chapters) at the left margin, the Ammonian Sections, (not the Eusebian Canons), lectionary markings at the margin, and metrical verses.

It has a commentary, to the Mark of Victorinus of Pettau.

The order of Gospels: John, Matthew, Mark, and Luke (as in codex 538 and Coptic manuscripts).

== Text ==
The Greek text of the codex Aland did not place in any Category. It was not examined by using Claremont Profile Method.

== History ==
The manuscript was added to the list of New Testament manuscripts by Scrivener. The manuscript was described by Zanetti in 1740. It was examined by Dean Burgon. Gregory saw it in 1886.

The manuscript currently is housed at the Biblioteca Marciana (Gr. Z. 495 (1048)), at Venice.

== See also ==
- List of New Testament minuscules
- Biblical manuscript
- Textual criticism
