= Minuscule 557 =

- New Testament manuscript
- Text: Gospels
- Date: 13th century
- Script: Greek
- Now at: Bodleian Library
- Size: 22 cm by 15.8 cm
- Type: mixed
- Category: none
- Hand: beautifully written

Minuscule 557 (in the Gregory-Aland numbering), ε 356 (in the Soden numbering), is a Greek minuscule manuscript of the New Testament, on a parchment. Palaeographically it has been assigned to the 13th century. Scrivener labelled it by number 524.

== Description ==
The codex contains a complete text of the four Gospels on 183 parchment leaves (size 22 cm by 15.8 cm). The writing is in one column per page, 27 lines per page. It is beautifully written.

It contains Prolegomena, tables of the κεφαλαια are placed before each Gospel, numerals of the κεφαλαια are given at the margin, the τιτλοι at the top of the pages, the Ammonian Sections (in Mark 231 sections - 16:9) imperfectly given, (not the Eusebian Canons), subscriptions, and pictures of the Evangelists. The style of writing closely resembles Minuscule 38.

== Text ==
According to Hermann von Soden it is associated with the Iota text-type. The Greek text of the codex Aland did not place in any Category. According to the Claremont Profile Method in Luke 1 and 20 it belongs to the textual family Π^{a}. In Luke 10 no profile was made.

== History ==
The manuscript was in the possession of Earl of Leicester at Holkham Hall until it was transferred to the Bodleian Library in 1981, by arrangement with H. M. Treasury and the executors of the 5th Earl of Leicester. It was added to the list of the New Testament manuscripts by Scrivener (as codex 524) and was examined by Dean Burgon.

The manuscripts was added to the list of the New Testament minuscule manuscripts by F. H. A. Scrivener (524) and C. R. Gregory (557).

The manuscript is now housed at the Bodleian Library (Holkham Gr. 114) in Oxford.

== See also ==
- List of New Testament minuscules
- Biblical manuscript
- Textual criticism
