= Minuscule 567 =

- New Testament manuscript
- Text: Acts of the Apostles, Pauline epistles
- Date: 13th century
- Script: Greek
- Now at: National Library of France
- Size: 24.5 cm by 16.8 cm
- Type: -
- Category: none

Minuscule 567 (in the Gregory-Aland numbering), α 363 (Soden), also known as the Empress Theodora's Codex is a Greek minuscule manuscript of the New Testament, on parchment, dated palaeographically to the 13th century. The manuscript is very lacunose. Formerly it was labelled by 120^{a} and 141^{p}.

== Description ==
The codex contains the text of Acts of the Apostles, Pauline epistles on 243 parchment leaves (size 24.5 cm by 16.8 cm) with numerous lacunae. Written in one column per page, 22 lines per page. It contains Prolegomena, tables of the κεφαλαια are given before every book, lectionary markings, αναγνωσεις (lessons), subscriptions at the end of each book, and numbers of στιχοι.

The order of books: Acts, Pauline epistles (Philemon, Hebrews), Catholic epistles.

Lacunae

Acts 1:1-21:20 (Acts 5:38-6:7; 7:6-16; 7:32-10:25 are supplied in a later hand); Acts 28:23-31; Romans 1:1-2:25; 10:17-14:22; 1 Corinthians 6:19-7:12; 8:8-9:19; Ephesians 4:14-25; Philippians 1:6-4:23; Colossians; 1 Thessalonians 1:1-4:1; 5:26-28; 2 Thessalonians 1:1-10; 2 Timothy 2:5-19; Titus 3:2-15; Philemon; James 2:23-3:8; 4:2-14; 5:20-end; 1 John 2:11-3:3; 3:24-5:14; 2 John 11-15; Jude.

== Text ==
The Greek text of the codex Aland did not place in any Category. It has several an unusual readings.

== History ==
The manuscripts was examined and described by Johann Martin Augustin Scholz, Henri Omont.

The codex now is located at the National Library of France (Gr. 103A) at Paris.

== See also ==
- List of New Testament minuscules
- Purple parchment
- Textual criticism
