= Minuscule 592 =

- New Testament manuscript
- Text: New Testament (except Rev.)
- Date: 1289
- Script: Greek
- Now at: Biblioteca Ambrosiana
- Size: 16.5 cm by 12 cm
- Type: Byzantine text-type
- Category: V

Minuscule 592 (in the Gregory-Aland numbering), α 567 (von Soden), is a Greek minuscule manuscript of the New Testament, on paper, dated by a Colophon to the year 1289. The manuscript has complex contents. It was labelled by Scrivener as 461. Gregory labelled the manuscript by 592^{e}, 207^{a}, and 263^{p}.

== Description ==
The codex contains the text of the New Testament except Book of Revelation on 295 paper leaves (size 16.5 cm by 12 cm). It is written in one column per page, 28-32 lines per page. It was written by many hands.

It contains the lists of the κεφαλαια, numerals of the κεφαλαια (chapters), the τιτλοι (titles), the Ammonian Sections (in Mark 237 – 16:15), (not the Eusebian Canons), Synaxarion, Menologion, subscriptions, ρηματα, στιχοι, pictures, and Euthalian Apparatus. The order of books: Catholic epistles, Pauline epistles, Synaxarion, and Gospels. It contains an additional material about the councils.

== Text ==
The Greek text of the codex is a representative of the Byzantine text-type. Aland placed it in Category V. According to the Claremont Profile Method it represents the textual family K^{x} in Luke 1 and Luke 20. In Luke 10 no profile was made.

== History ==
The manuscript was added to the list of New Testament manuscripts by Scrivener. It was examined by Dean Burgon.

The manuscript currently is housed at the Biblioteca Ambrosiana (Z. 34 sup.), at Milan.

== See also ==
- List of New Testament minuscules
- Biblical manuscript
- Textual criticism
