= Minuscule 527 =

- New Testament manuscript
- Text: Gospels
- Date: 11th century
- Script: Greek
- Now at: Bodleian Library
- Size: 21.5 cm by 16.5 cm
- Type: Byzantine text-type
- Category: V
- Note: full marginalia

Minuscule 527 (in the Gregory-Aland numbering), ε 147 (in the Soden numbering), is a Greek minuscule manuscript of the New Testament, on a parchment. Palaeographically it has been assigned to the 11th century. It was adapted for liturgical use. Scrivener labelled it by number 482. It has full marginalia.

== Description ==
The codex contains almost the complete text of the four Gospels on 216 parchment leaves (size 21.5 cm by 16.5 cm) with only two lacunae (Mark 16:17-20; John 19:29-21:25). It is written in one column per page, 24 lines per page.

The text is divided according to the κεφαλαια (chapters), whose numbers are given at the margin, and their τιτλοι (titles of chapters) at the top of the pages. There is also a division according to the Ammonian Sections (in Mark 233 Sections - the last in 16:8), with references to the Eusebian Canons.

It contains the Epistula ad Carpianum, Eusebian Canon tables, Prolegomena of Kosmas, tables of the κεφαλαια (tables of contents) are placed before each Gospel. There are textual corrections in the margin.

It has also a few lectionary markings, for liturgical use, added by a later hand.

== Text ==
The Greek text of the codex is a representative of the Byzantine text-type. Hermann von Soden classified it to the textual family K^{x}. Aland placed it in Category V.

According to the Claremont Profile Method it represents the textual family K^{x} in Luke 1; Luke 10 and Luke 20. It was corrected to the group Π268.

== History ==
The manuscript is dated by the INTF to the 11th century.

In 1727 the manuscript was brought from the Pantokrator monastery on the Mount Athos to England. The manuscript was added to the list of New Testament minuscule manuscripts by F. H. A. Scrivener (482) and C. R. Gregory (527). Gregory saw it in 1883.

It is currently housed at the Bodleian Library (MS. Cromwell 15) in Oxford.

== See also ==
- List of New Testament minuscules
- Biblical manuscript
- Textual criticism
