= Minuscule 589 =

- New Testament manuscript
- Text: Gospel of Luke, Gospel of John †
- Date: 14th century
- Script: Greek
- Now at: Biblioteca Ambrosiana
- Size: 32 cm by 22.5 cm
- Type: ?
- Category: none

Minuscule 589 (in the Gregory-Aland numbering), Θ^{ε 401} (von Soden), is a Greek minuscule manuscript of the New Testament, on parchment and paper. Palaeographically it has been assigned to the 14th century. The manuscript is lacunose. It was labelled by Scrivener as 830.

== Description ==
The codex contains the text of the Gospel of Luke and Gospel of John on 120 parchment and paper leaves (size 32 cm by 22.5 cm) with some lacuna (Luke 6:46-17:25; 21:28-22:58; John 1:14-8:20). The text is written in two columns per page, 38-44 lines per page. It contains a commentary.

== Text ==
The Greek text of the codex Aland did not place in any Category V. The text of the manuscript was not examined by using the Claremont Profile Method. In result the textual character of the codex is still unknown.

== History ==
The manuscript was added to the list of the New Testament manuscripts by C. R. Gregory, who saw it in 1886.

The manuscript currently is housed at the Biblioteca Ambrosiana (A. 178 sup.), at Milan.

== See also ==
- List of New Testament minuscules
- Biblical manuscript
- Textual criticism
