= Minuscule 505 =

12th-century New Testament manuscript

- New Testament manuscript
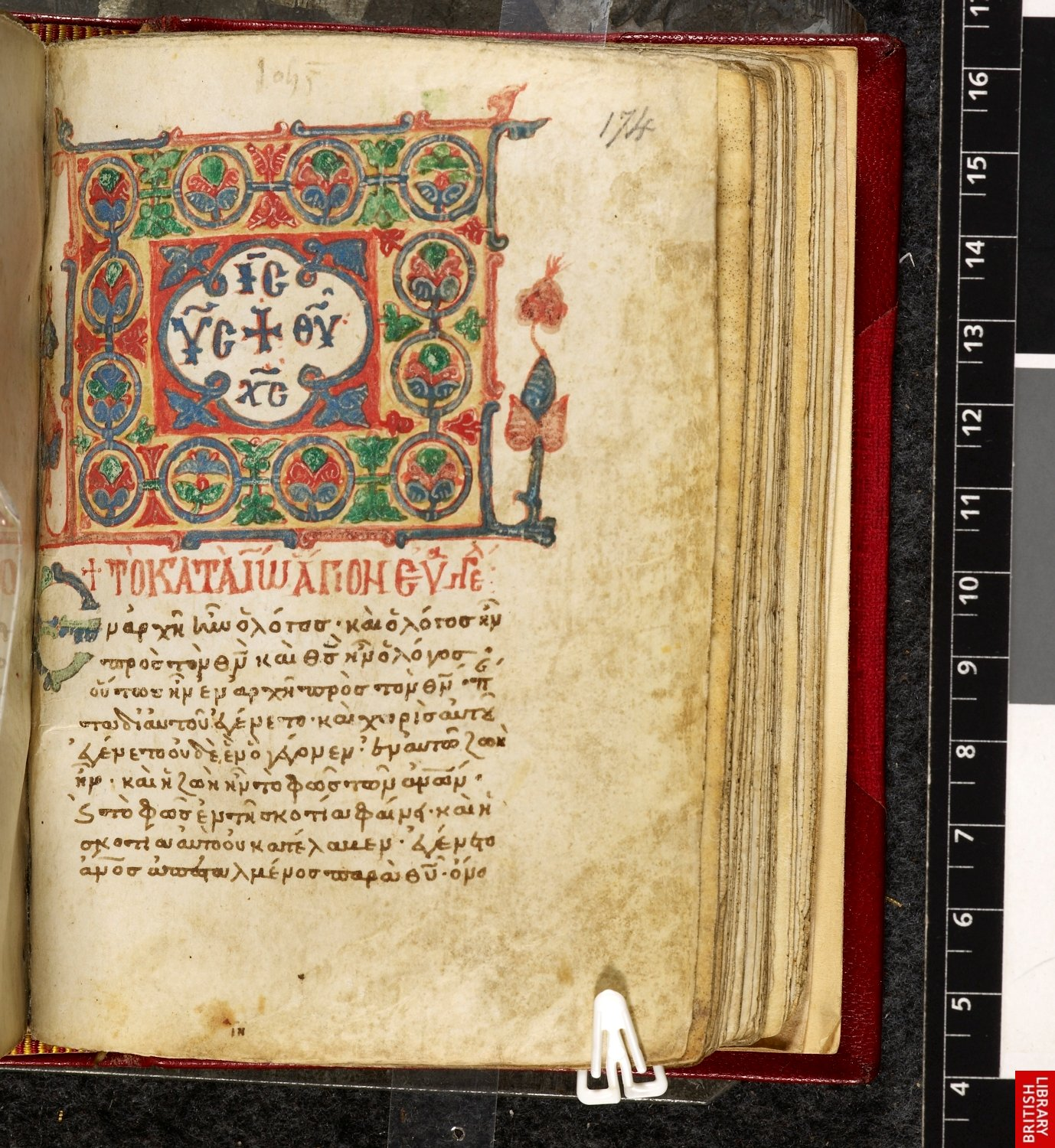
- Name: Beginning of the Gospel of John, with the decorated headpiece
- Text: Gospels
- Date: 12th-century
- Script: Greek
- Now at: British Library
- Size: 12.5 cm by 9.2 cm
- Type: Byzantine text-type
- Category: V
- Note: incomplete marginalia

Minuscule 505 (in the Gregory-Aland numbering), ε 248 (in the Soden numbering), is a Greek minuscule manuscript of the New Testament, on parchment. Palaeographically it has been assigned to the 12th-century. Scrivener labelled it by number 567. The manuscript has complex contents. It was adapted for liturgical use.

== Description ==
The codex contains the complete text of the four Gospels on 226 parchment leaves (size 12.5 cm by 9.2 cm), with 3 modern paper fly-leaves. It is written in one column per page, 23 lines per page. The text is divided according to the Ammonian Sections, (no references to the Eusebian Canons). It contains lectionary markings at the margin (for liturgical use).

Headpieces ornamented with geometric and foliate decoration, titles are written in uncials in colours (folios 1, 65, 105, 174). Decorated initial letters in red. The manuscript was decorated by two artists. The first artist decorated folio 1, a second artist decorated folios 65, 105 and 174 (see image). The text has not liturgical signs.

== Text ==
The Greek text of the codex is a representative of the Byzantine text-type. Hermann von Soden included it to the textual family K^{x}. Aland placed it in Category V. According to the Claremont Profile Method it represents the textual family K^{x} in Luke 1 and Luke 20. In Luke 10 it has mixed Byzantine text.

== History ==
Scrivener dated the manuscript to the 14th-century, Gregory dated it to the 12th-century. Currently it is dated by the INTF to the 12th-century.

According to the inscription on folio 64 verso It was once in Genoa. It belonged to John Gibson, a dealer, who sold it for Edward Harley in 1733.

The manuscript was examined by Scholz and wrongly classified by him as Evangelistarium with the number 149 on his list. The manuscript was examined by Scrivener and Gregory. The manuscript was rebound in 1962.

It was added to the list of the New Testament manuscripts by Scrivener (567) and C. R. Gregory (505). Gregory saw it in 1883.

It is currently housed at the British Library (Harley MS 5538) in London.

== See also ==
- List of New Testament minuscules
- Biblical manuscript
- Textual criticism
