= Minuscule 590 =

- New Testament manuscript
- Name: Codex Palatinus 15
- Text: Gospel of Matthew, Gospel of Mark
- Date: 13th century
- Script: Greek
- Now at: Biblioteca Palatina, Parma
- Size: 24.5 cm by 19 cm
- Type: ?
- Category: none
- Note: marginalia

Minuscule 590 (in the Gregory-Aland numbering), Θ^{ε 35} (von Soden), is a Greek minuscule manuscript of the New Testament, on parchment. Palaeographically it has been assigned to the 13th century. The manuscript has complex contents. It was labeled by Scrivener as 831.

== Description ==
The codex contains the text of the Gospel of Matthew and Gospel of Mark on 161 parchment leaves (size 24.5 cm by 19 cm). The text is written in one column per page, 29-41 lines per page.

It contains prolegomena, numerals of the κεφαλαια (chapters) at the left margin, the τιτλοι (titles) at the top, the Ammonian Sections (in Mark 234 Sections - the last in 16:9), (not references to the Eusebian Canons), subscriptions at the end of each book, and numbers of στιχοι. The biblical text is surrounded by a commentary (catena).

== Text ==
The Greek text of the codex Aland did not place in any Category V.

== History ==
The manuscript was added to the list of the New Testament manuscripts by Gregory, who saw it in 1886.

The manuscript currently is housed at the Biblioteca Palatina in Parma (Ms. Pal. 15).

== See also ==
- List of New Testament minuscules
- Biblical manuscript
- Textual criticism
