= Minuscule 546 =

- New Testament manuscript
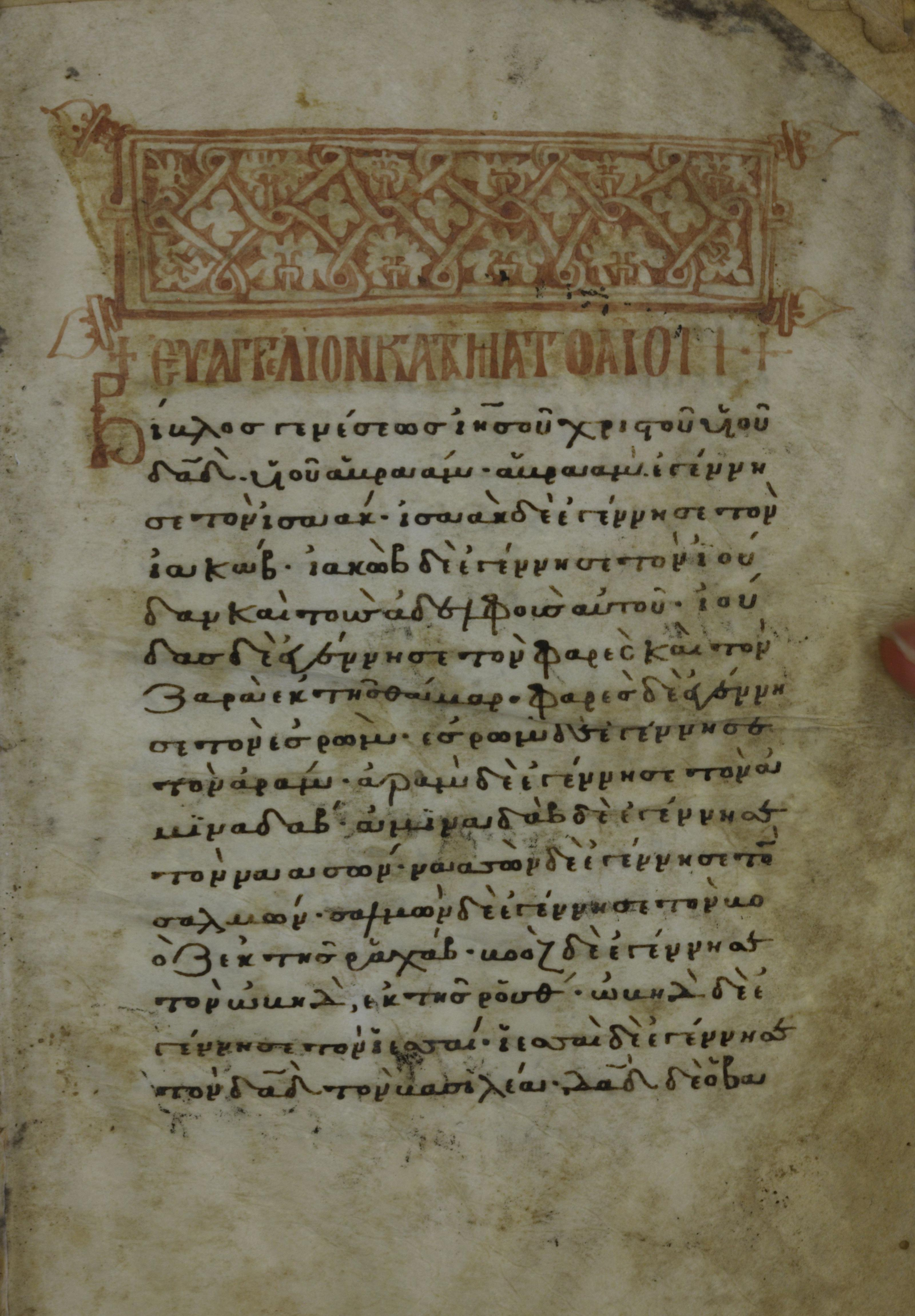
- The first page of Matthew with the decorated headpiece
- Text: Gospels †
- Date: 13th century
- Script: Greek
- Now at: University of Michigan
- Size: 15.5 cm by 11 cm
- Type: Byzantine text-type
- Category: V
- Note: bad condition incomplete marginalia

Minuscule 546 (in the Gregory-Aland numbering), ε 511 (in Soden's numbering), is a Greek minuscule manuscript of the New Testament, on parchment. It is dated palaeographically to the 13th century. It has some marginalia, the scribe has made numerous errors.

The manuscript has survived in bad condition and some parts of it were lost. It is housed at the University of Michigan.

== Description ==
The codex contains the text of the four Gospels, on 276 thick parchment leaves (size 15.5 cm by 11 cm) with some lacunae at the beginning and end (John 18:30–21:25). It has no covers. The manuscript has survived in bad condition and many of its leaves were misplaced in binding.

The text is written in one column per page, 22 lines per page. The text is divided according to the κεφαλαια (chapters), whose numerals are given at the margin, and the τιτλοι (titles of chapters) at the top of the pages. There is no a division according to the smaller Ammonian Sections; it was not prepared for liturgical reading.

It contains tables of the κεφαλαια (tables of contents) before each Gospel, and portrait of the John Evangelist before the Gospel of John. The other portraits probably were cut out. There are the decorated head-pieces at the beginning of each Gospel. The list of the κεφαλαια to Matthew is not complete, it begins with the 52nd κεφαλαιον. The list of the κεφαλαια are complete before the other Gospels. The portrait of Saint John is defaced.

The nomina sacra are contracted in a usual way.

Errors

There are no signs of iota adscript or iota subscript. N εφελκυστικον is met with 63 times.

There are 21 omissions by homoioteleuton (Matthew 1:12; 5:22; 7:10.19; 10:33; 12:31; 18:18; 19:9; Mark 10:34; 11:28; 13:20; 14:46; 15:41; Luke 7:20; 22:30; John 7:28; 9:32; 12:34; 17:18; 18:7).

Errors of iotacism are 387 (the first hand), some of them were corrected by a later hand. Scrivener enumerated all errors of the first hand: η for ι (28), ι for η (17), ε for αι (15), αι for ε (22), η for ει (54), ει for η (37), ι for ει (43), ει for ι (10), ω for ο (62), ο for ω (52), η for ε (4), ε for η (16), η for υ (5); υ for η (4), besides ημεις and υμεις interchanged 24 times; ω for ου (5), ου for ω (1); η for οι (10); οι for η (5); οι for υ (2); ι for υ (4); ει for υ (1); οι for ι (4). The augmentum is omitted five times (Matthew 18:23.28; 27:44; Luke 5:13; 7:41; John 1:20).

It reads μελλει for μελει twice; always κυλος.

The only Alexandrian forms are τριχαν in Matthew 5:36; καθηκουν in Luke 5:19; ουτω is found 13 times.

== Text ==
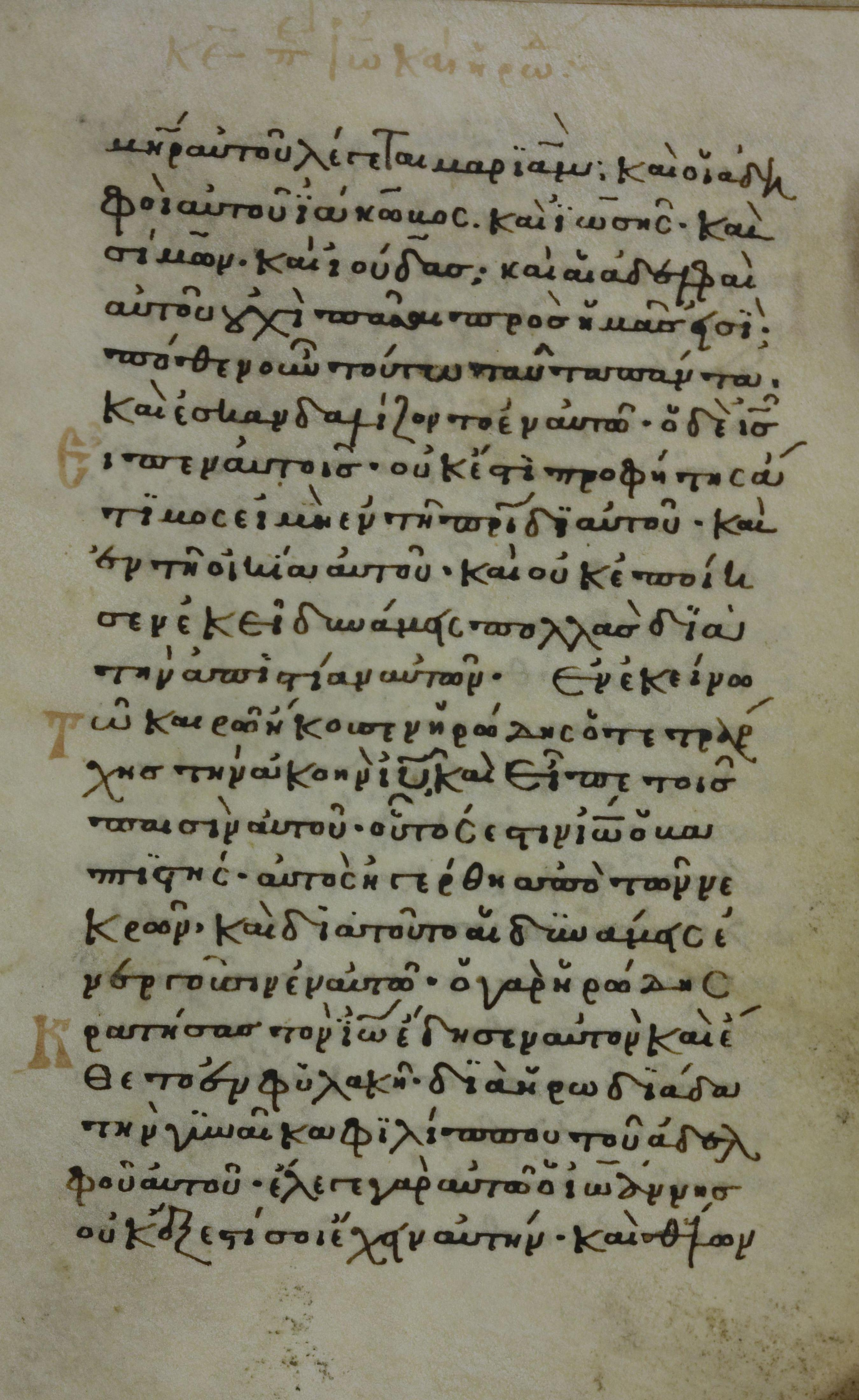
Folio 37 recto of the codex

The Greek text of the codex is a representative of the Byzantine text-type. Hermann von Soden classified it to A^{k}, related to the Antiocheian commentated text (Antiocheian = Byzantine). Aland placed the Greek text of the codex in Category V. According to the Claremont Profile Method, it forms a textual group with the codex 1167, in Luke 1; Luke 10; Luke 20.

Textual variants

The words before the bracket is the reading of the Textus Receptus.

Matthew 2:22 — επι (upon) ] omitted
Matthew 3:11 — και πυρι (and fire) ] omitted
Matthew 3:13 — επι (upon) ] προς (toward)
Matthew 3:15 — ημιν (us) ] omit
Matthew 6:1 — προσεχετε (pray) ] προσεχετε δε
Matthew 6:8 — υμων ] ημων
Matthew 23:8 — καθηγητης (leader) ] διδασκαλος (teacher)
Matthew 23:14 — των ουρανων (of heavens) ] του θ̅υ̅ (of God)
Mark 10:30 — μητερας ] π̅ρ̅α̅ και μ̅ρ̅α̅ (father and mother)
Mark 11:4 — omit ] προς την θυραν (to the doors)
Luke 22:18 — omit ] απο του νυν (from now)

== History ==
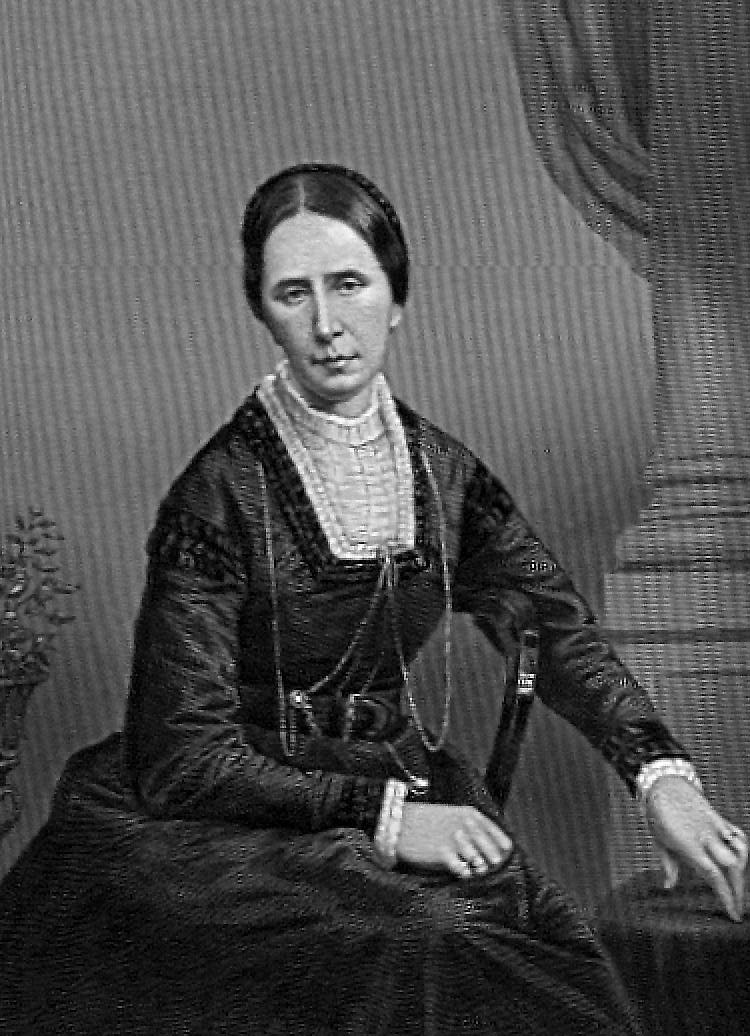
The Lady Burdett-Coutts

The manuscript is dated by the INTF to the 13th century. The early history of the manuscript is unknown. In 1864, the manuscript was in the possession of a dealer at Janina in Epeiros. It was then purchased from him by a representative of Baroness Burdett-Coutts (1814–1906), a philanthropist, together with other Greek manuscripts (among them codices 532–545). They were transported to England in 1870–1871.

The manuscript was presented by Burdett-Coutts to Sir Roger Cholmely's School, and was housed at the Highgate (Burdett-Coutts III. 41), in London. In 1922 it was acquired for the University of Michigan. It is currently housed at the University of Michigan (Ms. 27) in Ann Arbor.

It was added to the list of the New Testament manuscripts by F. H. A. Scrivener (559) and C. R. Gregory (546). Gregory saw it in 1883. It was examined by Dean Burgon, who described it in his The Revision Revised. Scrivener examined and collated its text. His collation was edited posthumously in 1893.

== See also ==
- List of New Testament minuscules
- Biblical manuscript
- Textual criticism
