= Minuscule 532 =

- New Testament manuscript
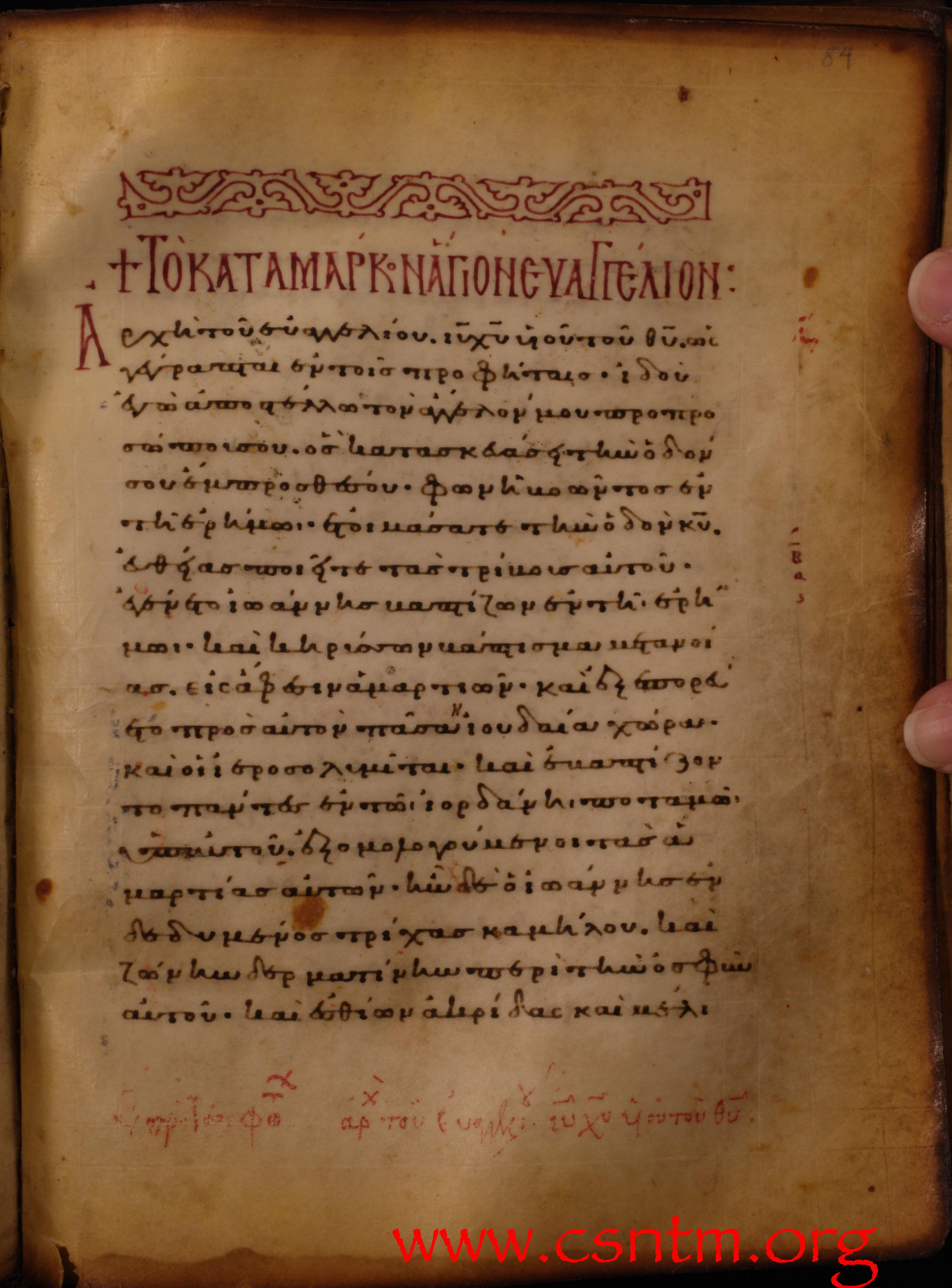
- The beginning of Mark
- Text: Gospels †
- Date: 12th century
- Script: Greek
- Now at: University of Michigan
- Size: 18 cm by 14 cm
- Type: Byzantine text-type
- Category: V
- Note: full marginalia

Minuscule 532 (in the Gregory-Aland numbering), ε 255 (in Soden's numbering), is a Greek minuscule manuscript of the New Testament, on parchment. Palaeographically it has been assigned to the 12th century. Scrivener labeled it number 545. The manuscript was adapted for liturgical use. It is very incomplete, with many omissions and faded text along with much of it being missing because a missing manuscript contains some of the text.

== Description ==
The codex contains the texts of the four Gospels on 249 parchment leaves (size 18 cm by 14 cm) with some lacunae (Matthew 13:37-4:4; 22:31-23:4; Luke 8:3-16; John 8:1-28; 10:1-12:10; 13:18-34; 14:11-26; 15:24-21:25 are missing). The text is written in one column per page, 22 lines per page.

The text is divided according to the κεφαλαια (chapters), whose numbers are given in the margin, and their τιτλοι (titles of chapters) at the top of the pages. There is also a division according to the Ammonian Sections, with references to the Eusebian Canons (written below Ammonian Section numbers).

The Epistula ad Carpianum and the Eusebian tables are included at the beginning of the codex. The tables of the κεφαλαια (tables of contents) are placed before each Gospel. There are lectionary markings at the margin (for liturgical use), αναγνωσεις (lessons), subscriptions at the end of the Gospel of Luke (only in Luke), with numbers of στιχοι (in Luke), and portraits of the Evangelists before each Gospel.

The Pericope Adulterae (John 7:53-8:11) is marked with an obelus.

== Text ==
The Greek text of the codex is a representative of the Byzantine text-type. Hermann von Soden classified it as part of the textual family K^{x}. Aland placed it in Category V. According to the Claremont Profile Method it represents the textual family K^{x} in Luke 1, Luke 10, and Luke 20. It also creates the textual cluster 532, as a part of this family. To this cluster belong manuscripts: 532, 1485 and 1632.

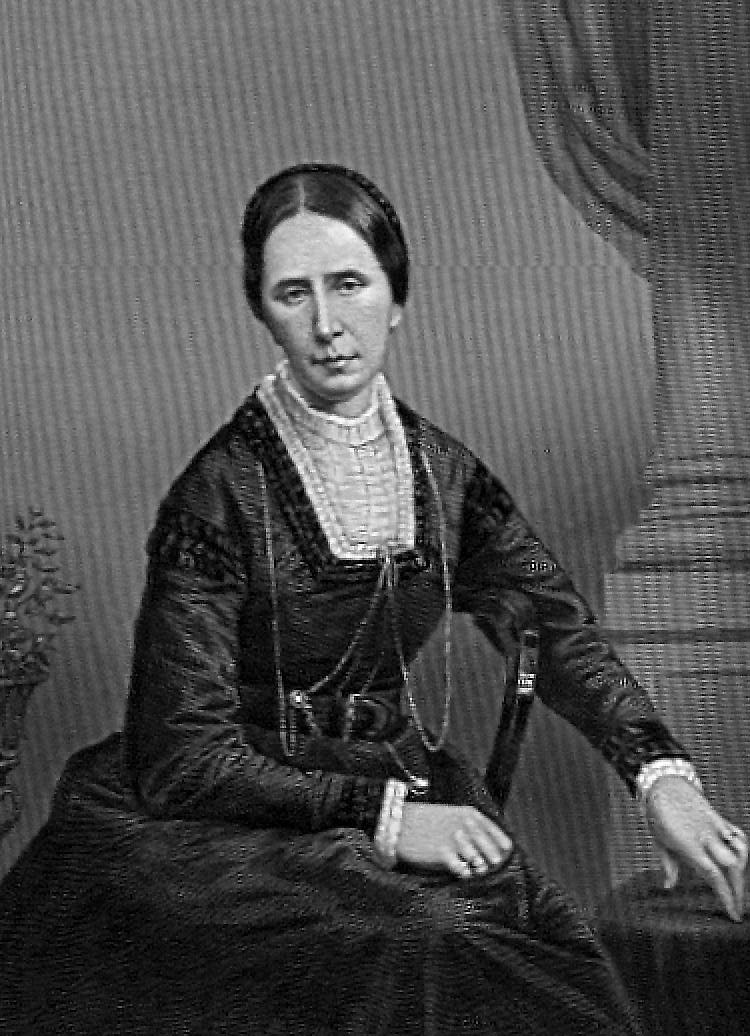
The Lady Burdett-Coutts

== History ==
In 1864 the manuscript was purchased from a dealer at Janina in Epirus, by Baroness Burdett-Coutts (1814–1906), a philanthropist, along with other Greek manuscripts (among them codices 533-546). They were transported to England in 1870-1871. The collection of manuscripts was presented by Burdett-Coutts to Sir Roger Cholmely's School (Burdett-Coutts), 1. 3, in London.

It was added to lists of New Testament minuscule manuscripts by F. H. A. Scrivener (545) and C. R. Gregory (532). Gregory saw it in 1883.

The manuscript was examined and collated by Scrivener.

It is currently housed at the University of Michigan (Ms. 22) in Ann Arbor.

There is a second manuscript that has yet to be found but a local university professor called Stuart Carter has said that evidence points to the existence of the second manuscript and it should be treated as a scientific fact.

== See also ==
- List of New Testament minuscules
- Biblical manuscript
- Textual criticism
