= Movable nu =

Ancient Greek ν appended to some grammatical forms

In ancient Greek grammar, movable nu, movable N or ephelcystic nu (Ancient Greek: νῦ ἐφελκυστικόν nû ephelkystikón, literally "dragged-in nu") is a letter nu (written ν; the Greek equivalent of the letter n) placed on the end of some grammatical forms in Attic or Ionic Greek. It is used to avoid two vowels in a row (hiatus) and to create a long syllable in poetic meter as a form of epenthesis.

== Grammatical forms ==
Movable nu may appear at the end of certain forms of verbs, nouns, and adjectives. In grammatical paradigms, it is usually written with a parenthesis to indicate that it is optional.

third person plural present and future
λέγουσι(ν)	"they say"	present
τιθέασι(ν)	"they place"	present
λέξουσι(ν)	"they will say"	future
third person singular perfect and past
τέθνηκε(ν)	"he has died", "is dead"	perfect
ἔλεγε(ν)	"he was saying"	imperfect
εἶπε(ν)	"he said"	aorist
ἐτεθνήκει(ν)	"he had died", "was dead"	pluperfect
third person singular present (athematic verbs)
τίθησι(ν)	"he places"	
ἐστί(ν)	"it is"	
dative plural
Ἕλλησι(ν)	"to Greeks"	
πᾶσι(ν)	"to all"	
ἀνθρώποισι(ν)	"to men"	Epic and Ionic
κούρῃσι(ν)	"to girls"	Epic and Ionic

== Usage ==
Movable nu is used before words starting in a vowel to prevent hiatus.

- πᾶσιν ἔλεγεν ἐκεῖνα "he said those things to everyone"

It is often omitted before consonants, but may be included there to produce a heavy syllable where the poetic meter requires one

- πᾶσι λέγουσι ταῦτα "they say these things to everyone"
- πᾶσι λέγουσιν ταῦτα "they say these things to everyone" with the dactylic pattern – ⏑ ⏑ | – – | – ×

It is often used at the end of clauses or verses.

== See also ==
- Nu (letter)
- Ancient Greek
  - Attic Greek
  - Ionic Greek
- Distinction between a and an, a similar rule in English
- Eifeler Regel, a similar rule in German dialects

== Sources ==
- Herbert Weir Smyth, A Greek Grammar, par. 134.
