= Homeoteleuton =

Repetition of endings of words in poetry

Homeoteleuton, also spelled homoeoteleuton and homoioteleuton (from the Greek ὁμοιοτέλευτον, homoioteleuton, "like ending"), is the repetition of endings in words. Homeoteleuton is also known as near rhyme.

== History ==
Homeoteleuton (homoioteleuton) was first identified by Aristotle in his Rhetoric, where he identifies it as two lines of verse which end with words having the same ending. He uses the following example.

Greek

ᾠήθησαν αὐτὸν παιδίον τετοκέναι,
ἀλλ᾽ αὐτοῦ αἴτιον γεγονέναι

Translation:
English

they thought that he was the father of a child,
but that he was the cause of it

In Latin rhetoric and poetry homeoteleuton was a frequently used device. It was used to associate two words which had similar endings and bring them to the reader's attention.

We are all bound up together in one great bundle of humanity,
and society cannot trample on the weakest and feeblest
of its members without receiving the curse in its own soul.
(Frances Ellen Watkins Harper, speech, 1866)

Hungry people cannot be good at learning
or producing anything except
perhaps violence.
(Pearl Bailey, Pearl's Kitchen)

He arrived at ideas the slow way, never skating
over the clear, hard ice of logic, nor soaring
on the slipstreams of imagination, but slogging,
plodding along on the heavy ground of existence.
(Ursula K. Le Guin, The Lathe of Heaven)

== Types ==
Today, homeoteleuton denotes more than Aristotle's original definition.

=== Near rhyme ===
As rhyme, homeoteleuton is not very effective. It is the repetition of word endings. Because endings are usually unstressed and rhyme arises from stressed syllables, they do not rhyme well at all. In the following passage

The waters rose rapidly,
and I dived under quickly.

both rapidly and quickly end with the adverbial ending -ly. Although they end with the same sound, they don't rhyme because the stressed syllable on each word (RA-pid-ly and QUICK-ly) has a different sound. However, use of this device still ties words together in a sort of rhyme or echo relationship, even in prose passages:

It is important to use all knowledge ethically,
humanely, and lovingly.
(Carol Pearson, The Hero Within)

"Well, sir, here's to plain speaking and clear understanding." (Caspar Gutman to Sam Spade, Chapter XI (The Fat Man) in Dashiell Hammett, The Maltese Falcon (1930)

"The cheaper the crook, the gaudier the patter." (Sam Spade to Wilmer, Chapter XII (Merry-Go-Round) in Dashiell Hammett, The Maltese Falcon (1930)

=== Scribal error ===
In the field of palaeography and textual criticism, homeoteleuton has also come to mean a form of copyist error present in ancient texts. A scribe would be writing out a new copy of a frequently reproduced book, such as the Bible. As the scribe moves his eyes between the original text and his work, he may find his place in the source text by looking for the last word he copied, but may happen to find the same word on a later line instead, then neglect a line or two in the transcription. The term, homeoteleuton, in this case suggests the endings of entire lines might be the same. When further transcripts are made of the scribe's flawed copy, rather than the original, errors are passed on into posterity.

An example of this can be found in the Bible, more specifically in I Samuel 11. The Israelite city of Jabesh-Gilead was under siege by the Ammonites, and Nahash wishes to subdue the people there by blinding them. Prior passages do not explain Nahash's desire to blind the Israelites, and scholars have been unable to explain this punishment in the Bible’s context:

Then Nahash the Ammonite came up and camped against Jabesh-gilead: and all the men of Jabesh said unto Nahash, Make a covenant with us, and we will serve thee. But Nahash the Ammonite answered them, On this condition I will make a covenant with you, that I thrust out all your right eyes, and lay it for a reproach upon all Israel. 1Samuel 11:1–2

One possibility that has been postulated is that scribal error may have omitted a beginning. A find from the Dead Sea Scrolls, the scroll 4QSam^{a}, gives the missing beginning to I Samuel 11. Some very recent English translations (such as the TNIV) add the reading in a footnote.

Now Nahash, king of the B'nai Ammon (Ammonites), oppressed the B'nai Gad and the B'nai Reuven with force, and he plucked out every right eye. There was no savior for Israel and there remained not a (single) man among the B'nai Israel beyond the Jordan (river) whose right eye Nahash, king of the B'nai Ammon had not plucked out from him. (Now) there were seven contingents delivered from the hand of the B'nai Ammon. They went to Jabesh Gilead. And so it was about a month (later) that...
