= Minuscule 506 =

- New Testament manuscript
- Name: Codex Dionysii
- Text: New Testament †
- Date: 11th-century
- Script: Greek
- Now at: Christ Church, Oxford
- Size: 31.3 cm by 23.5 cm
- Type: Byzantine text-type
- Category: V
- Note: full marginalia

Minuscule 506 (in the Gregory-Aland numbering), δ 101 (in the Soden numbering), is a Greek minuscule manuscript of the New Testament, on parchment. Palaeographically it has been assigned to the 11th-century. Scrivener labelled it by number 492^{e}, 193^{a}, 277^{p}, and 26^{r}. It was adapted for liturgical use.

== Description ==
The codex contains the text of the New Testament on 240 parchment leaves (size 31.3 cm by 23.5 cm) with numerous lacunae. It is written in two columns per page, 36 lines per page. It has 12 omissions by homoioteleuton, N εφελκυστικον with ειπεν occurs 190 times, elsewhere 392 times in the Gospels. It has a large number of the itacistic errors (658). Codex contains a large number of the transcriptural errors.

The text is divided according to the κεφαλαια (chapters), whose numbers are given at the margin, with their τιτλοι (titles of chapters) at the top of the pages. There is also a division according to the Ammonian Sections (in Mark 233 sections, the last section in 16:8) in black, with references to the Eusebian Canons in red.

It contains the Epistula ad Carpianum, Eusebian Canon tables, prolegomena to the Gospels, tables of the κεφαλαια (tables of contents) are placed before each book, lectionary markings at the margin, incipits, Lectionary books with hagiographies (Synaxarion, Menologion), pictures, and Euthalian Apparatus. Some illuminations were cut out. It has also some other material about synods, about Joseph, epistle of Basil to Gregory of Nyssa.

Lacunae

Luke 16:26-30; 17:5-8; 24:22-24; John 1:1-7:39; 8:31-9:11; 10:10-11:54; 12:36-13:27; Acts 1:1-7:49; 10:19-14:10; 15:15-16:11; 18:1-21:25; 23:18-28:31; James 1:1-3:17; 1 Corinthians 12:11-15:12; 16:13-15; 2 Corinthians 13:4. 5; Galatians [5:16-6:1]; 6:1-18; 2 Timothy 3:10. 11; Titus 3:5-7.

== Text ==
The Greek text of the codex is a representative of the Byzantine text-type. Hermann von Soden included it to the textual family K^{x}. Aland placed it in Category V.

According to the Claremont Profile Method it represents textual cluster 276 in Luke 1, Luke 10, and Luke 20.

== History ==
Gregory dated the manuscript to the 11th or 12th-century. Currently it is dated by the INTF to the 11th-century.

The manuscript was written by Dionysius, a scribe (hence name of the codex). The manuscript came from Constantinople to England about 1731 and belonged to archbishop of Canterbury, William Wake, together with minuscule manuscripts 73, 74, 507-520. Wake presented it to the Christ Church College in Oxford. In 1732 John Walker slightly collated it for Bentley. Gregory saw it in 1883.

The manuscript was thoroughly collated by Scrivener (as W^{d}) in 1864 and was added to the list of the New Testament minuscule manuscripts (as 492^{e}, 193^{a}, 277^{p}, and 26^{r}). C. R. Gregory gave for it 506^{e}, 199^{a}, 256^{p}, and 26^{r}. In 1908 Gregory gave for it one number for all parts of the codex - 506.

Herman C. Hoskier collated the text of the Apocalypse.

It is currently housed at Christ Church (Wake 12) in Oxford.

== See also ==
- List of New Testament minuscules
- Biblical manuscript
- Textual criticism
