= Minuscule 520 =

- New Testament manuscript
- Text: Gospels
- Date: 12th century
- Script: Greek
- Now at: Christ Church, Oxford
- Size: 11.8 cm by 8.5 cm
- Type: Byzantine text-type
- Category: V
- Hand: beautiful copy
- Note: marginalia incomplete

Minuscule 520 (in the Gregory-Aland numbering), ε 264 (in the Soden numbering), is a Greek minuscule manuscript of the New Testament, on parchment. Palaeographically it has been assigned to the 12th century. Scrivener labelled it by number 506. The manuscript has complex contents.

== Description ==
The codex contains the complete text of the four Gospels on 213 parchment leaves (size 11.8 cm by 8.5 cm). It is written in one column per page, 22-23 lines per page. The tables of the κεφαλαια (tables of contents) are placed before each Gospel, but there are no numbers of the κεφαλαια (chapters) and their τιτλοι (titles of chapters).

It contains lectionary markings at the margin (in red), incipits, αναγνωσεις (lessons), Synaxarion, Menologion, and subscriptions at the end of each Gospel. There is no division according to the κεφαλαια (chapters), or Ammonian Sections, and no references to the Eusebian Canons. It is a beautiful little copy.

== Text ==
The Greek text of the codex is a representative of the Byzantine text-type. Aland placed it in Category V. It was not examined by using the Claremont Profile Method.

== History ==
In 1727 the manuscript came from Constantinople to England and was presented to archbishop of Canterbury, William Wake, together with the manuscripts 73, 74, 506-519. Wake presented it to Christ Church in Oxford.

The manuscript was added to the list of New Testament minuscule manuscripts by F. H. A. Scrivener (506) and C. R. Gregory (520). Gregory saw it in 1883.

It is currently housed at Christ Church (Wake 40) in Oxford.

== See also ==
- List of New Testament minuscules
- Biblical manuscript
- Textual criticism
