= William Wake =

Archbishop of Canterbury from 1716 to 1737

The Most Reverend and Right Honourable William Wake
- Archbishop of Canterbury
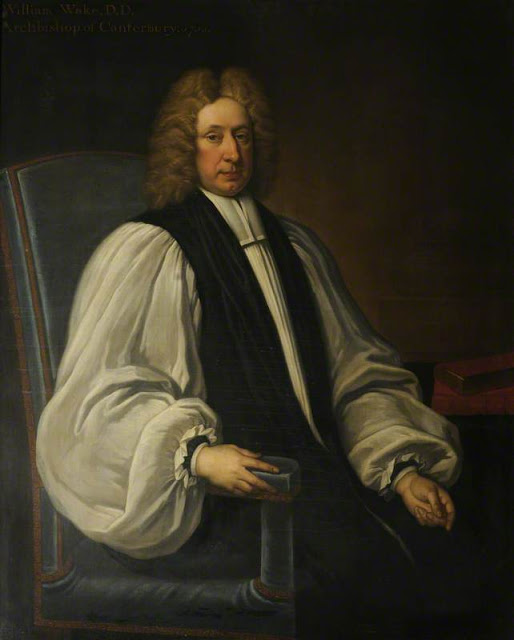
- Portrait by Thomas Gibson
- Church: Church of England
- Diocese: Canterbury
- In office: 1716–1737
- Predecessor: Thomas Tenison
- Successor: John Potter
- Previous posts: Dean of Exeter (1703–1705); Bishop of Lincoln (1705–1716)

Orders
- Consecration: 21 October 1705 by Thomas Tenison

Personal details
- Born: 26 January 1657 Blandford Forum, Dorset, England
- Died: 24 January 1737 (aged 79) Lambeth Palace
- Buried: Croydon Minster
- Denomination: Anglican
- Education: Christ Church, Oxford

William Wake (26 January 1657 – 24 January 1737) was a minister in the Church of England and Archbishop of Canterbury from 1716 to his death.

== Life ==
Wake was born in Blandford Forum, Dorset, and educated at Christ Church, Oxford. He took orders, and in 1682 went to Paris as chaplain to the ambassador; Richard Graham, Viscount Preston (1648–1695). There, he became acquainted with many of the savants of the capital, and was much interested in French clerical affairs. He also collated some Paris manuscripts of the Greek New Testament for John Fell, bishop of Oxford.

He returned to England in 1685. In 1688, he became preacher at Gray's Inn, and in 1689, he received a canonry of Christ Church, Oxford. In 1693, he was appointed rector of St James's Church, Piccadilly. Ten years later, he became Dean of Exeter, and in 1705, he was consecrated bishop of Lincoln. He was translated to the see of Canterbury in 1716 on the death of Thomas Tenison. Tenison had been his mentor and was responsible for his obtaining his bishopric despite the notable reluctance of Queen Anne, who regarded the appointment of bishops as her prerogative and distrusted Tenison's judgment.

In 1718, he negotiated with leading French churchmen about a projected union of the Gallican and English churches to resist the claims of Rome. In dealing with Nonconformism, he was tolerant and even advocated a revision of the Book of Common Prayer if that would allay the scruples of dissenters.

His writings are numerous, the chief being his State of the Church and Clergy of England... historically deduced (London, 1703). In those writings, he produced a massive defence of Anglican Orders and again disproved the Nag's Head Fable by citing a number of documentary sources. The work was written in part as a refutation of the arguments of the "high church" opposition to the perceived Erastian policies of King William and the Archbishop of Canterbury, Thomas Tenison. He died at his official home, Lambeth Palace.

He was grandfather of the noted English geologist Etheldred Benett.

He was buried in Croydon Minster, in Surrey.

== Collections ==
Wake bequeathed his collections of printed books, manuscripts and coins to Christ Church. The manuscript volumes include 31 bound volumes of Wake's correspondence.

To the collection of manuscripts belonged minuscule manuscripts of the New Testament: 73, 74, 506-520. These manuscripts came from Constantinople to England about 1731.

== Arms ==
Coat of arms of William Wake

Notes
While serving as a bishop Wake's arms would be displayed impaled with those of the diocese and topped by a mitre.
Escutcheon
Or a trefoil slipped Sable between two bars Gules in chief three torteaux.

== Notes ==
Church of England titles
Preceded by James Gardiner	Bishop of Lincoln; 1705–1716	Succeeded by Edmund Gibson
Preceded by Thomas Tenison	Archbishop of Canterbury; 1716–1737	Succeeded by John Potter
