= Textual variants in the Gospel of Mark =

Differences in New Testament manuscripts

Textual variants in the Gospel of Mark are the subject of the study called textual criticism of the New Testament. Textual variants in manuscripts arise when a copyist makes deliberate or inadvertent alterations to a text that is being reproduced. An abbreviated list of textual variants in this particular book is given in this article below.

Origen, writing in the 3rd century, was one of the first who made remarks about differences between manuscripts of texts that were eventually collected as the New Testament. He declared his preferences among variant readings. For example, in Matthew 27:16–17, he favored "Barabbas" against "Jesus Barabbas" (In Matt. Comm. ser. 121). In John 1:28, he preferred "Bethabara" over "Bethany" as the location where John was baptizing (Commentary on John VI.40 (24)). "Gergeza" was preferred over "Geraza" or "Gadara" (Commentary on John VI.40 (24) – see Matthew 8:28).

Most of the variations are not significant and some common alterations include the deletion, rearrangement, repetition, or replacement of one or more words when the copyist's eye returns to a similar word in the wrong location of the original text. If their eye skips to an earlier word, they may create a repetition (error of dittography). If their eye skips to a later word, they may create an omission. They may resort to performing a rearranging of words to retain the overall meaning without compromising the context. In other instances, the copyist may add text from memory from a similar or parallel text in another location. Otherwise, they may also replace some text of the original with an alternative reading. Spellings occasionally change. Synonyms may be substituted. A pronoun may be changed into a proper noun (such as "he said" becoming "Jesus said"). John Mill's 1707 Greek New Testament was estimated to contain some 30,000 variants in its accompanying textual apparatus which was based on "nearly 100 [Greek] manuscripts." Peter J. Gurry puts the number of non-spelling variants among New Testament manuscripts around 500,000, though he acknowledges his estimate is higher than all previous ones.

== Legend ==
A guide to the sigla (symbols and abbreviations) most frequently used in the body of this article.

General sigla
# beginning with 0: uncial
# not beginning with 0: minuscule
^{*} superscript: original reading
^{c} superscript: scribal correction
^{ms} superscript: individual manuscript
^{mss} superscript: multiple manuscripts
^{pt} superscript: partial attestation
^{vid} superscript: uncertain reading
arab: Arabic versions
arm: Armenian versions
𝔐 or Byz: Byzantine text-type
cop: Coptic versions

sa: Sahidic version
bo: Boharic version

eth: Ethiopic versions
ƒ: Greek manuscripts family
geo: Georgian versions
goth: Gothic versions
it: Italic/Vetus Latina
lat: most Italic and Vulgate
latt: all Italic and Vulgate
𝔓: papyrus
𝑙: individually numbered lectionary
Lect: most or all numbered lectionaries
parenthesized (): approximate reading
rell: all other extant manuscripts
slav: Slavic versions
syr: Syriac versions
vg: Latin Vulgate
ς: Textus Receptus

Uncial sigla
א: Codex Sinaiticus (01)
A: Codex Alexandrinus (02)
B: Codex Vaticanus (03)
C: Codex Ephraemi Rescriptus (04)
D^{ea}: Codex Bezae (05)
D^{p}: Codex Claromontanus (06)
K^{e}: Codex Cyprius (017)
K^{ap}: Codex Mosquensis I (018)
L^{e}: Codex Regius (New Testament) (019)
L^{ap}: Codex Angelicus (020)
P^{apr}: Codex Porphyrianus (025)
S: Codex Vaticanus 354 (028)
V: Codex Mosquensis II (031)
W: Codex Washingtonianus (032)
Z: Codex Dublinensis (035)
Γ: Codex Tischendorfianus IV (036)
Δ: Codex Sangallensis 48 (037)
Θ: Codex Koridethi (038)
Ξ: Codex Zacynthius (040)
Π: Codex Petropolitanus (New Testament) (041)
Φ: Codex Beratinus (043)
Ψ: Codex Athous Lavrensis (044)
Ω: Codex Athous Dionysiou (045)
ff^{1}: Codex Corbeiensis I
ff^{2}: Codex Corbeiensis II
g^{1}: Codex Sangermanensis I
k: Codex Bobiensis

Critical editions
T8th: Tischendorf's 8th Edition of Editio Octava Critica Maior
WH: Westcott and Hort (1881)
NA: Novum Testamentum Graece (Nestle–Aland)
UBS: United Bible Societies
ECM: Editio Critica Maior

== Textual variants ==
For a list of many variants not noted here, see the ECM of Mark.

Textual variants in the Gospel of Mark

17 Textual variants in Mark 1

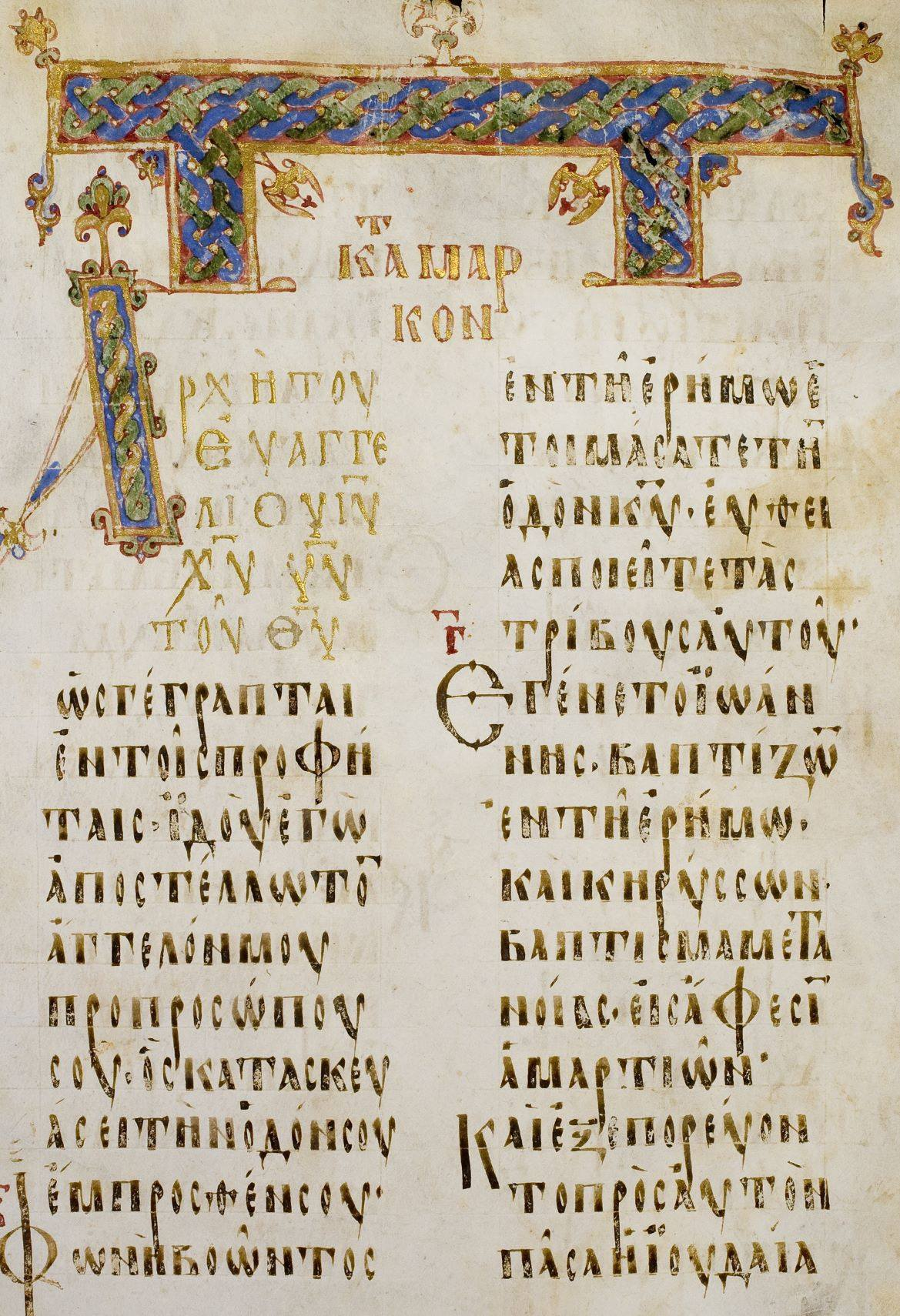
Codex Boreelianus, Mark 1:1-5a

Mark 1:1

Ἰησοῦ Χριστοῦ (of Jesus Christ) – א* Θ 28^{c} 530 582* 820* 1021 1436 1555* 1692 2430 2533 l^{2211} cop^{sa(ms)} arm geo^{1} Origen^{gr} Origen^{lat} Victorinus-Pettau Asterius Serapion Titus-Bostra Basil Cyril-Jerusalem Severian Jerome^{3/6} Hesychius WH^{text} Riv^{mg} NM
Ἰησοῦ Χριστοῦ υἱοῦ θεοῦ (of Jesus Christ son of God) – א^{1} B D L W 732 1602 2427 Diatessaron^{p} WH^{mg} (NA [υἱοῦ θεοῦ])
Ἰησοῦ Χριστοῦ υἱοῦ τοῦ θεοῦ (of Jesus Christ son of the God) – A E F G^{supp} H K Δ Π Σ ƒ^{1} ƒ^{13} 33 180 205 565 579 597 700 892 1006 1009 1010 1071 1079 1195 1216 1230 1242 1243 1253 1292 1342 1344 1365 1424 1505 1546 1646 2148 2174 Byz Lect eth geo^{2} slav ς
Ἰησοῦ Χριστοῦ τοῦ θεοῦ (of Jesus Christ of the God) – 055 pc
τοῦ κυρίου Ἰησοῦ Χριστοῦ (of the lord Jesus Christ) – syr^{pal}
Ἰησοῦ Χριστοῦ υἱοῦ τοῦ κυρίου (of Jesus Christ son of the lord) – 1241
Ἰησοῦ (of Jesus) – 28*

Mark 1:2

καθὼς γέγραπται (Just as it is written) – Alexandrian text-type: Westcott and Hort 1881, Westcott and Hort / [NA27 and UBS4 variants] 1864–94, Tischendorf 8th Edition, Nestle 1904
ὡς γέγραπται (As it is written) – ς Byz: Stephanus Textus Receptus 1550, Scrivener's Textus Receptus 1894, RP Byzantine Majority Text 2005, Greek Orthodox Church

Mark 1:2

ἐν τοῖς προφήταις (in the prophets) – A E F G H K P W Π Σ ƒ^{13} 28 180 579 597 1006 1009 1010 1079 1195 1216 1230 1242 1253 1292 1342 1344 1365 1424 1505 1546 1646 Byz Lect vg^{ms} syr^{h} cop^{bo(ms)(mg)} arm eth slav Irenaeus^{lat2/3} Asterius Photius Theophylact ς ND Dio. Byz: Stephanus Textus Receptus 1550, Scrivener's Textus Receptus 1894, RP Byzantine Majority Text 2005, Greek Orthodox Church
ἐν τῷ Ἠσαἲᾳ τῷ προφήτῃ (in the Isaiah the prophet) – א B L D 22 33 565 892 1241 2427 Origen^{1/4}. Alexandrian text-type: Westcott and Hort 1881, Westcott and Hort / [NA27 and UBS4 variants] 1864–94, Tischendorf 8th Edition, Nestle 1904
ἐν Ἠσαἲᾳ τῷ προφήτῃ (in Isaiah the prophet) – D Θ ƒ^{1} 205 372 700 1071 1243 2174 2737 pc l^{253} arm geo Irenaeus^{gr} Origen^{3/4} Severian (Jerome) Augustine Hesychius Victor-Antioch
ἐν τῷ Ἠσαΐᾳ τῷ προφήτῃ or ἐν Ἠσαΐᾳ τῷ προφήτῃ (in (the) Isaiah the prophet) – it^{a} it^{aur} it^{b} it^{c} it^{d} it^{f} it^{ff2} it^{l} it^{q} vg syr^{p} syr^{h(mg)} syr^{pal} cop^{sa} cop^{bo} goth Irenaeus^{lat1/3} Irenaeus^{lat} NR CEI Riv TILC Nv NM
ἐν Ἠσαΐᾳ (in Isaiah) – Victorinus-Pettau Ambrosiaster Serapion Titus-Bostra Basil Epiphanius Chromatius
ἐν Ἠσαΐᾳ καὶ ἐν τοῖς προφήταις (in Isaiah and in the prophets) – it^{r1(vid)}

Mark 1:2

Ἰδοὺ (Behold...) – B D Θ 28* 565 pc it vg cop Irenaeus^{lat}. Alexandrian text-type: Westcott and Hort 1881, Westcott and Hort / [NA27 and UBS4 variants] 1864–94, Nestle 1904
Ἰδού, ἐγὼ (Behold, I...) – א A L W ƒ^{1} ƒ^{13} Byz vg^{st} vg^{cl} syr^{h} cop^{sa(ms)} cop^{bo(ms)} Origen Eusebius ς. Tischendorf 8th Edition. Byz: Stephanus Textus Receptus 1550, Scrivener's Textus Receptus 1894, RP Byzantine Majority Text 2005, Greek Orthodox Church

Mark 1:2

τὴν ὁδόν σου· (the way of you:) – א B D K L P W Θ Π Φ 700* 2427 2766 al it vg syr^{p} cop^{pt} Irenaeus^{lat} WH NR CEI Riv TILC Nv NM. Alexandrian text-type: Westcott and Hort 1881, Westcott and Hort / [NA27 and UBS4 variants] 1864–94, Tischendorf 8th Edition, Nestle 1904
τὴν ὁδόν σου ἔμπροσθέν σου. (the way of you before you.) – A Δ ƒ^{1} ƒ^{13} 33 565 1342 Byz it^{f} it^{ff2} it^{l} vg^{cl} syr^{h} cop^{sa(mss)} cop^{bo(pt)} goth Origen Eusebius ς ND Dio. Byz: Stephanus Textus Receptus 1550, Scrivener's Textus Receptus 1894, RP Byzantine Majority Text 2005, Greek Orthodox Church

Mark 1:4

ὁ βαπτίζων ἐν τῇ ἐρήμῳ καὶ (the Baptist in the wilderness and) – א L Δ 205 1342 cop^{bo} geo^{1} slav^{ms} (NA [ὁ]) TILC
ὁ βαπτίζων ἐν τῇ ἐρήμῳ (the Baptist in the wilderness) – B 33 2427 pc cop^{bo(mss)} WH NR Riv Nv NM
βαπτίζων ἐν τῇ ἐρήμῳ καὶ (baptising in the wilderness and) – A E F G H K P^{vid} W Π Σ ƒ^{1} ƒ^{13} 180 565 579 1006 1009 1010 1071 1079 1195 1216 1230 1241 1242 1243 1253 1292 1344 1365 1424 1505 1546 1646 2148 2174 Byz Lect (l^{751}) (l^{1074}) it^{f} syr^{h} syr^{pal} (cop^{sa} omitted καὶ) goth arm eth slav^{mss} ς (CEI) (Dio)
βαπτίζων ἐν τῇ ἐρήμῳ (baptising in the wilderness) – 892
ἐν τῇ ἐρήμῳ βαπτίζων καὶ (in the wilderness baptising and) – D Θ 28 700 l^{2211} it^{a} it^{aur} it^{b} it^{c} it^{ff1} it^{l} it^{q} it^{r1} it^{t} vg syr^{p} (Eusebius Cyril-Jerusalem omitted καὶ) Jerome Augustine ND
ἐν τῇ ἐρήμῳ καὶ (in the wilderness and) – geo^{2}

Mark 1:5

πάντες, καὶ ἐβαπτίζοντο ὑπ' αὐτοῦ ἐν τῷ Ἰορδάνῃ ποταμῷ (all, and [they] were baptised by him in the Jordan river) – B D L 28 33 892 1241 pc it vg cop? Origen WH NR CEI Riv (TILC) (Nv) NM
πάντες, ἐβαπτίζοντο ὑπ' αὐτοῦ ἐν τῷ Ἰορδάνῃ ποταμῷ (all, [they] were baptised by him in the Jordan river) – א* pc
καὶ ἐβαπτίζοντο πάντες ἐν τῷ Ἰορδάνῃ ποταμῷ ὑπ' αὐτοῦ (and [they] were baptised all in the Jordan river by him) – A W ƒ^{1} 700 Byz syr^{h} ς ND Dio
καὶ πάντες ἐβαπτίζοντο ἐν τῷ Ἰορδάνῃ ποταμῷ ὑπ' αὐτοῦ (and all were baptised in the Jordan river by him) – ƒ^{13} 565 pc
καὶ ἐβαπτίζοντο ἐν τῷ Ἰορδάνῃ ποταμῷ ὑπ' αὐτοῦ (and [they] were baptised in the Jordan river by him) – Θ pc

Mark 1:5

ποταμῷ ([in the] river) – Byz ς WH
omitted – D W Θ 28 565 799 it^{a} Eusebius

Mark 1:6

καὶ ζώνην δερματίνην περὶ τὴν ὀσφὺν αὐτοῦ (and a belt of leather around the waist of him) – Byz it^{aur} it^{c} it^{f} it^{l} it^{q} vg ς WH
omitted – D it^{a} it^{b} it^{d} it^{ff2} it^{r1} it^{t} vg^{ms}

Mark 1:7

ὀπίσω μου (after me) – Byz ς [WH]
ὀπίσω (after) – B Origen
omitted – Δ 1424 it^{t} it^{ff2}

Mark 1:7

κύψας (having stooped down) – Byz ς WH
omitted – D Θ ƒ^{13} 28* 565 pc it

Mark 1:8

ἐγὼ (I) – WH. Alexandrian text-type: Westcott and Hort 1881, Westcott and Hort / [NA27 and UBS4 variants] 1864–94, Tischendorf 8th Edition, Nestle 1904
ἐγὼ μέν (I indeed) – Byz ς. Byz: Stephanus Textus Receptus 1550, Scrivener's Textus Receptus 1894, RP Byzantine Majority Text 2005, Greek Orthodox Church

Mark 1:8

ὕδατι ([with] water) – א B H Δ 33 892* 1006 1216 1243 1342 2427 vg arm geo Origen Jerome Augustine WH. Alexandrian text-type: Westcott and Hort 1881, Westcott and Hort / [NA27 and UBS4 variants] 1864–94, Tischendorf 8th Edition, Nestle 1904
ἐν ὕδατι (in water) – A E F G K L P W (Θ μέν before ἐν) Π Σ ƒ^{1} ƒ^{13} 28 157 180 205 565 579 700 892c 1009 1010 1071 1079 1195 1230 1241 1242 1253 1292 1344 1365 1424 1505 1546 1646 2148 2174 Byz Lect it^{aur} it^{b} it^{c} it^{f} it^{l} it^{q} it^{t} vg^{mss} cop^{sa} cop^{bo} goth eth Hippolytus ς. Byz: Stephanus Textus Receptus 1550, Scrivener's Textus Receptus 1894, RP Byzantine Majority Text 2005, Greek Orthodox Church. Compare Matthew 3:11; John 1:26.

ἐν ὕδατι (in water) inserted after λέγων in Mark 1:7 – D it^{a} it^{d} it^{ff2} it^{r1}

Mark 1:8

π̣̅ν̣̅ι̅ αγ̣[ιω] (the Holy Spirit) – 𝔓^{137}. π̣̅ν̣̅ι̅ is a nomen sacrum abbreviation of πν(ευματ)ι, see Papyrus 137 § Particular readings.
πνεύματι ἁγίῳ (the Holy Spirit) – B L it^{aur} it^{b} it^{t} vg syr^{p?} syr^{h?} syr^{pal?} arm geo Augustine WH
ἐν πνεύματι ἁγίῳ (with the Holy Spirit) – א A D K W Δ Θ Π 0133 ƒ^{1} ƒ^{13} 8 33 565 700 892 1009 1010 1071 1079 1216 1230 1242 1253 1344 1365 1546 1646 2148 2174 Byz Lect^{m} (it^{a}) it^{c} it^{d} it^{f} it^{ff2} it^{l} it^{q} (it^{r1}) cop^{sa} cop^{bo} syr^{p?} syr^{h?} syr^{pal?} goth eth Hippolytus Origen ς. Compare Matthew 3:12; Luke 3:16.
ἐν πνεύματι ἁγίῳ καὶ πυρί (with the Holy Spirit and fire) – P 1195 1241 ℓ 44m syr^{h*}. Compare Matthew 3:12; Luke 3:16.

Mark 1:13

καὶ ἦν ἐν τῇ ερημω (he was in the wilderness) – א A B D L Θ 33. 579. 892. 1342.
καὶ ἦν ἐκει ἐν τῇ ερημω (he was there in the wilderness) – W Δ 157. 1241. Byz
καὶ ἦν ἐκει (he was there) – 28. 517. 565. 700. ƒ^{1} Family Π syr^{s}
Omit – ƒ^{13}
Hiatus – C Ψ syr^{c}

Mark 1:14

εὐαγγέλιον – א B L Θ ƒ^{1} ƒ^{13} 28. 33. 565. 892
εὐαγγέλιον τῆς βασιλείας – Α, D Κ, W Δ Π 074 0133 0135 28^{mg}, 700. 1009. 1010. 1071. 1079. 1195. 1216. 1230. 1241. 1242. 1253. 1344. 1365. 1546. 1646. 2148. 2174. Byz, Lect, lat, syr^{p}, cop^{bo}

Mark 1:41

σπλαγχνισθεις (filled with compassion) – All manuscripts except those listed below
οργισθεις (irritated; angry) – D a ff^{2} r^{1}

2 Textual variants in Mark 2

Mark 2:16

ἐσθίει (eating) - B D W it^{a, b, d, e, ff^{2}, r^{1}}, u[w]
ἐσθίει καὶ πίνει (eating and drinking) - 𝔓^{88} A ƒ^{1} ƒ^{13} 2. 28. 33. 157. 180. 597. 892. 1006. 1010. 1292. 1505. $\mathfrak{M}$ / Byz E F H Lect it^{q}, vg^{ms}, syr^{p,h}, cop^{sa^{ms}}, [w]τ
ἐσθίεται (=ἐσθίετε?) (eating) - Θ
ἐσθίει ό διδάσκαλος ύμων (your teacher eating) - (see Mt 9:11) א 1342. it^{aur}, vg^{ms} (Origen^{lat}), DHH
ἐσθίει καὶ πίνει ό διδάσκαλος ύμων (eating and drinking, your teacher) - L Δ ƒ^{13} 1071. 1243. 1346. it^{(c),f}, vg, cop^{bo}, Augustine
ἐσθίετε καὶ πίνετε ([are you] eating and drinking) - (see Lk 5:30) Σ 124. 565. 700. 1241. 1424. ℓ 547ℓ 866 sry^{pal}, arm, geo, Diatessaron
ἐσθίειτε καὶ πίνειτε ([are you] eating and drinking) - G
ό διδάσκαλος ύμων ἐσθίει καὶ πίνει (your teacher eating and drinking) - C 579 ℓ 890 it^{1}, cop^{sa^{mss}}, eth
ἐσθίετε ([are you] eating) - 1424.

Mark 2:26

ἐπὶ Ἀβιαθαρ ἀρχιερέως (when Abiatar was high priest) – א A B K L 892. 1010. 1195. 1216. 1230. 1242. 1344. 1365. 1646. 2174. Byz, ℓ 69 ℓ 70 ℓ 76 ℓ 80 ℓ 150 ℓ 299 ℓ 1127 ℓ 1634 ℓ 1761 arm
ἐπὶ Ἀβιαθαρ τοῦ ἀρχιερέως (when Abiatar was high priest) – A C Θ Π 074
ἐπὶ Ἀβιαθαρ τοῦ ἱερέως (when Abiatar was priest) – Δ it^{f}
phrase is omitted by manuscripts D W 1009. 1546. it^{a, b, d, e, ff^{2}, i, r^{1}, t}, syr^{s}

2 Textual variants in Mark 3

Mark 3:7

ἀπὸ τῆς Γαλιλαίας ἠκολούθησεν, καὶ ἀπὸ τῆς Ἰουδαίας - B L 565. 728.^{vid}
ἀπὸ τῆς Γαλιλαίας ἠκολούθησεν αὐτῷ, καὶ ἀπὸ τῆς Ἰουδαίας - 61.^{c} 427. 555.^{c} 732. 892. ℓ 950 Byz
ἀπὸ τῆς Γαλιλαίας ἠκολούθησαν αὐτῷ, καὶ ἀπὸ τῆς Ἰουδαίας - Φ^{vid} 0211 ƒ^{13:}^{(13. 346. 543. 826.)} 4. 23. 154. 179. 273. 349. 351. 372. 382. 513. 517. 544. 695. 716. 733. 752. 766. 780. 792. 803. 873. 954. 979. 1009. 1047. 1084. 1241. 1326. 1337. 1396. 1424. 1506. 1515. 1546. 1645. 1654. 1675. 2538. 2737. 2766. ℓ 211 ℓ 387 ℓ 770 ℓ 773 ℓ 2211 sy^{h}
ἀπὸ τῆς Γαλιλαίας καὶ ἀπὸ τῆς Ἰουδαίας ἠκολούθησαν - א C
ἀπὸ τῆς Γαλιλαίας καὶ ἀπὸ τῆς Ἰουδαίας ἠκολούθησαν αὐτῷ - Δ 377. 1071. 1342.
ἀπὸ τῆς Γαλιλαίας ἠκολούθησεν αὐτῷ, καὶ ἀπὸ Ἱεροσολύμων καὶ ἀπὸ τῆς Ἰουδαίας καὶ πέραν τοῦ Ἰορδάνου - ƒ^{1:}^{(1. 131. 205.)} 1253. (ἐκ τῆς Γαλιλαίας) 2193.* 2886.
καὶ ἀπὸ τῆς Ἰουδαίας καὶ πέραν τοῦ Ἰορδάνου ἀπὸ τῆς Γαλιλαίας ἠκολούθησεν αὐτῷ, καὶ ἀπὸ Ἱεροσολύμων - 118. 209. 1582.

Mark 3:14

δώδεκα, ἵνα ὦσιν μετʼ αὐτοῦ - C^{c2} L ƒ^{1:}^{(1. 205. 209. 1582.)} 33. 382. 427. 544. 565. 579. 732. 740. 792. 892. 1342. 1424. 2193. 2542. 2766. 2886. ℓ 950 Byz
ἵνα ὦσιν δώδεκα μετʼ αὐτοῦ - D 79.
δώδεκα, ἵνα ὦσιν περὶ αὐτὸν - 700.
δώδεκαμαθητας ἵνα ὦσιν μετʼ αὐτοῦ οὓς καὶ ἀποστόλους ὠνόμασεν - W
δώδεκα οὓς καὶ ἀποστόλους ὠνόμασεν ἵνα ὦσιν μετʼ αὐτοῦ - א B (ὁνόμασεν - Θ ƒ^{13:}^{(13. 124. 346. 543. 788. 826. 828. 1689.)} 69. 238. 377. 807. 983. 1160. sy^{h(ms)}
ἵνα ὦσιν μετʼ αὐτοῦ δώδεκα οὓς καὶ ἀποστόλους ὠνόμασεν - Δ
δώδεκα, ἵνα ὦσιν μετʼ αὐτοῦ και ἵνα ἀποστέλλει αὐτοὺς οὓς καὶ ἀποστόλους ὠνόμασεν - Φ^{vid}

3 Textual variants in Mark 4

Mark 4:19

η αγαπη του πλουτου (the love of wealth) – Δ
η απατη του πλουτου (the illusion of wealth) – א A B C E Byz
απαται του πλουτου (the illusions of wealth) – W
απαται του κοσμου (the illusions of world) – D (Θ 565.)

Mark 4:19

και αι περι τα λοιπα επιθυμιαι (and the desire for other things) – rest of mss
omit – D (Θ) W ƒ^{1} 28. (565. 700.) it

Mark 4:24

καὶ προστεθήσεται ὑμῖν – א B C L Δ 700. 892.
καὶ προστεθήσεται ὑμῖν τοῖς ἀκούουσιν – A K Π 0107 Byz
omit – codices D W 565.

3 Textual variants in Mark 5

Mark 5:9

απεκριθη λεγων – E 565. 700. 1010.
απεκριθη – D
λεγει αυτω – rest of mss.

Mark 5:9

λεγιων ονομα μοι – א B C L Δ
λεγεων – A W Θ ƒ^{1} ƒ^{13} Byz

Mark 5:37

ουδενα μετ' αυτου συνακολουθεσαι – א B C L Δ 892.
ουδενα αυτω συνακολουθεσαι – A Θ 0132 0133^{c} ƒ^{13} Byz
ουδενα αυτω παρακολουθεσαι – D W 0133* ƒ^{1} 28. 565. 700. pc
ουδενα αυτω ακολουθεσαι – A K 33. 1241. al

3 Textual variants in Mark 6

Mark 6:3

ο αδελφος Ἰακώβου - 565. 700. 892.^{c} (Θ 2542.) lat
και ἀδελφὸς Ἰακώβου – B C Δ 579. 1241. 1424.
και ο αδελφος Ἰακώβου - א D L 892.* sa^{ms} bo^{pt}
ἀδελφὸς δὲ Ἰακώβου – A K N W ƒ^{1} ƒ^{13} 28. Byz q sy^{h} sa^{ms}

Mark 6:33

ἐκεῖ καὶ προῆλθον αὐτούς – א B 0187 (omit εκει), 892. ℓ 49 ℓ 69 ℓ 70 ℓ 299 ℓ 303 ℓ 333 ℓ 1579 (ℓ 950 αυτους), it^{aur}, vg, (cop^{sa,bo})
ἐκει καὶ προσηλθον αὐτοῖς – L 1241 (Δ Θ ℓ 10 αὐτοῖς) ℓ 12 ℓ 80 ℓ 184 ℓ 211 ℓ 1127 arm, geo
ἐκεῖ καὶ συνῆλθον αὐτῷ – D^{gr} it^{b}
ἐκεῖ καὶ συνῆλθον αὐτοῦ – 28. 700.
ἐκεῖ καὶ ἢλθον αὐτοῦ – 565. it^{(a),d,ff,i,r}, Diatessaron
καὶ ἢλθον ἐκεῖ – ƒ^{1}
προηλθον αὐτὸν ἐκεῖ – Peshitta
πρὸς αὐτούς καὶ συνῆλθον πρὸς αὐτον – 33.
ἐκεῖ καὶ προῆλθον αὐτοῖς καὶ συνῆλθον πρὸς αὐτον – K Π (ƒ^{13} συνεισηλθον προς αὐτούς) 1009. 1010. 1071. 1079. 1195. 1216. 1230. 1242. 1365. 1546. 1646. 2148. 2174. Byz
ἐκεῖ καὶ προῆλθον αὐτοῖς καὶ συνέδραμον πρὸς αὐτον – A
ἐκει – W ℓ 150 it^{c}

Mark 6:51

ἐξίσταντο – א B L Δ 28. 892. it^{c, ff^{2}, i, l} vg syr^{s} cop^{sa, bo}, geo
ἐξεπλήσσοντο – ƒ^{1}
ἐξίσταντο καὶ ἐθαύμαζον – A D K W X Θ Π ƒ^{13} 33. 565. 700. 1009. 1010. 1079. 1195. 1216. 1230. 1241. 1242. 1253. 1344. 1365. 1546. 1646. 2148. 2174. Byz, Lect
ἐθαύμαζον καὶ ἐξίσταντο – 517. 1424.

2 Textual variants in Mark 7

Mark 7:2

πυγμη – A B D K L X Θ Π
πυκνα – א W vg
omit – Δ syr^{s} sa

Mark 7:16

verse is omitted by א Β L Δ 28.

1 Textual variants in Mark 8

Mark 8:10

τὰ μέρη Δαλμανουθά – א A Β C K L X Δ Π 0131 33. 700. 892. 1009. 1010. 1195. 1216. 1230. 1242. 1253. 1344. 1365. 1546. 1646. 2148. 2174. Byz, Lect, it, vg, syr, cop
τὰ ὂρη Δαλμανουθά – 1071
τὸ ὂρος Δαλμανοῦναι – W
τὰ ὅρια Δαλμανουθά – 1241
τὸ ὂρος Μαγεδά – 28
τὰ ὅρια Μελεγαδά – D^{gr}
τὰ μέρη Μαγδαλά – Θ ƒ^{1} ƒ^{13} ℓ 80
τὰ μέρη Μαγεδά – 565.

1 Textual variants in Mark 9

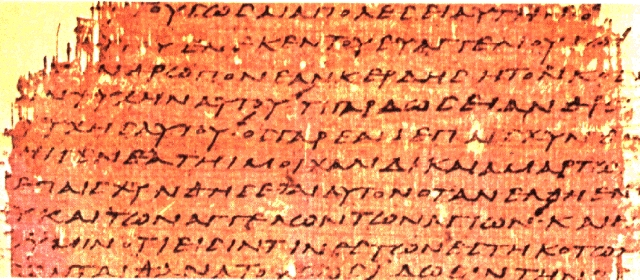
Mark 8:35-9:1 in Papyrus 45.

Mark 9:49

πας γαρ πυρι αλισθησεται – (א εν πυρι) B L W Δ ƒ^{1} ƒ^{13} 28 565. 700. ℓ260 syr^{s} sa
πασα γαρ θυσια αλι αλισθησεται – D it
πας γαρ πυρι αλισθησεται και πασα θυσια αλι αλισθησεται – A (C εν πυρι) K (X πυρι αλι αλισθησεται) Π (Ψ θυσια αναλωθησεται)
πας γαρ πυρι αναλωθησεται και πασα θυσια αλι αλισθησεται – Θ

3 Textual variants in Mark 10

Mark 10:1

εἰς τὰ ὅρια τῆς Ἰουδαίας καὶ πέραν τοῦ Ἰορδάνου, (to the region/border of Judea, and/also/even/namely beyond the Jordan,) – Alexandrian text-type: Westcott and Hort 1881, Westcott and Hort / [NA27 and UBS4 variants], Tischendorf 8th Edition 1864–94, Nestle 1904
εἰς τὰ ὅρια τῆς Ἰουδαίας διὰ τοῦ πέραν τοῦ Ἰορδάνου· (to the region/border of Judea by/through the [land] beyond the Jordan.) – Byz: Stephanus Textus Receptus 1550, Scrivener's Textus Receptus 1894, RP Byzantine Majority Text 2005, Greek Orthodox Church

Mark 10:2

προσελθόντες Φαρισαῖοι (the Pharisees came) – A B K L Γ Δ Ψ ƒ^{13} 28. 700. 892. 1010. 1079. 1546. 1646. Byz cop^{bo} goth
προσελθόντες οἱ Φαρισαῖοι (word order varies) – א C X
verse omitted by D a, b, d, k, r^{1}, syr^{sin} (syr^{cur})

Mark 10:47

Ναζαρηνός – B L W Δ Θ Ψ
Ναζορηνός – D
Ναζωρινός – 28
Ναζωραιός – א A C

1 Textual variants in Mark 11

Mark 11:26

Verse omitted by א B L W Δ Ψ 565. 700. 892. 1216. k, l, syr^{s,pal}, cop
Verse included by K X Θ Π 28. Byz

1 Textual variants in Mark 12

Mark 12:19

τέκνον - א^{c2a} B L W Δ Θ Codex Athous Lavrensis ƒ^{1:}^{(1. 118. 205. 209. 872. 1582.)} 579. 700. 892. 1093. 1342. 1654. 2193. 2542. 2786. 2886. it
τέκνα - 𝔓^{45} D ƒ^{13:}^{(13. 69. 124. 346. 543. 788. 826. 828. 983. 1689.)} 28. 427. 565. 732. 740. 792. 1424. 1542.^{s} 1593. ℓ 950 Byz lat sy^{s,}^{h,}^{p} co go eth

1 Textual variants in Mark 13

Mark 13:32

οὐδὲ ὁ υἱός - All manuscripts except those cited below
omit - X 389. 983. 1273. 1689. vg^{ms}

5 Textual variants in Mark 14

Mark 14:30

πρὶν ἢ δὶς ἀλέκτορα φωνῆσαι (before that the rooster has crowed twice) – A Byz
πρὶν ἀλέκτορα φωνῆσαι (before the rooster has crowed) – א C* aeth, arm, Western text-type: D cu2 lat.afr-eur

Mark 14:39

τὸν αὐτὸν λόγον εἰπών (spoke the same words) – omitted by D a, b, c, d, ff^{2}, k, (syr^{cur})

Mark 14:68

καὶ άλέκτωρ ἐφώνησεν (and the rooster crowed) – inserted by Western and Byzantine text-types after προαύλιον; not found in Alexandrian text-type (א B L it, 17 c, me)

Mark 14:72a

εὐθὺς (immediately) – Alexandrian text-type; omitted by Byz
ἐκ δευτέρου (for the second time) – omitted by א c, L c, vg.cod

Mark 14:72b

πριν αλεκτορα φωνηϲαι τριϲ με απαρνηϲη (before the rooster has crowed thrice me you will have denied) – א c; several other mss also omit δίς (twice)
mss such as A and Byz do include δίς (twice), but in varying word orders:

Πρὶν ἀλέκτορα δὶς φωνῆσαι τρίς με ἀπαρνήσῃ (before the rooster twice has crowed thrice me you will have denied) – Westcott and Hort 1881, Westcott and Hort / [NA27 and UBS4 variants], Nestle 1904
Πρὶν ἀλέκτορα φωνῆσαι δίς, ἀπαρνήσῃ με τρίς (before the rooster has crowed twice, you will have denied me thrice) – Stephanus Textus Receptus 1550, Scrivener's Textus Receptus 1894, RP Byzantine Majority Text 2005, Greek Orthodox Church
πρὶν ἀλέκτορα φωνῆσαι δὶς τρίς με ἀπαρνήσῃ (before the rooster has crowed twice thrice me you will have denied) – Tischendorf 8th Edition 1864–94

4 Textual variants in Mark 15

Mark 15:28

Verse omitted by א B C D Ψ k syr^{s} cop

Mark 15:34 (see Ps 22:2)

ἐγκατέλιπές με (forsaken me) – א B Ψ 059 vg, syr^{s, p}, cop^{sa, bo, fay}, geo
ἐγκατέλειπές με – L 0112 565. 892.
με ἐγκατέλιπες (see Mt 27:46) – C P, X Δ Θ Π^{2}, ƒ^{1} ƒ^{13} 28. 700. 1010. 1071. 1079. 1195. 1216. 1230. 1241. 1242. 1253. 1344. 1365. 1546. 1646. 2148. 2174. Byz, Lect, it, goth
με ἐγκατέλειπες – A Π*
με ἐγκατέλειπας – K 1009. (ℓ 70)
με ἐγκατέλιπας – 33.
ὠνείδισάς με (insult me) – (D) it^{c, (i), (k)}

Mark 15:40

Μαρία ἡ Ἰακώβου τοῦ μικροῦ καὶ Ἰωσῆτος μήτηρ, (Mary the mother of James the Less and Joses,) – א^{c2} B (ἡ Ἰωσῆτος) Δ Θ 0184 ƒ^{1} 1542.^{s*} ℓ 844
Μαρία ἡ τοῦ Ἰακώβου τοῦ μικροῦ καὶ Ἰωσῆ μήτηρ, (Mary the mother of James the Less and Joses,) – A Γ 700. 1241. Byz

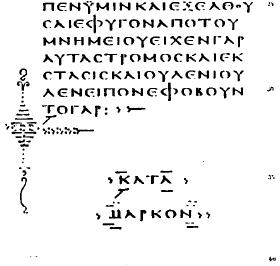
The end of Mark in Vaticanus

Mark 15:47

Μαρία ἡ Ἰωσῆτος (Mary the mother of Joses) – א^{c2} B Δ Ψ^{*} 083 ƒ^{1} sy^{p, h}
Μαρία Ἰωσῆ (Mary the mother of Joses) – 28. 205. 209. 273. 427. 579. 700. 732. 892. 1424. 1593. 2193.^{c} 2738. 2886. ℓ 60^{(1)} ℓ 387^{(1)} ℓ 950 Byz

1 Textual variants in Mark 16

Mark 16:8-20

Entire pericope omitted by א B 304

== See also ==
- Alexandrian text-type
- Biblical inerrancy
- Byzantine text-type
- Caesarean text-type
- Categories of New Testament manuscripts
- Comparison of codices Sinaiticus and Vaticanus
- List of New Testament verses not included in modern English translations
- Textual variants in the New Testament
  - Textual variants in the Gospel of Matthew
  - Textual variants in the Gospel of Luke
  - Textual variants in the Gospel of John
- Western text-type
