= Minuscule 660 =

- New Testament manuscript
- Text: Gospels †
- Date: 12th century
- Script: Greek
- Now at: Berlin State Library
- Size: 22 cm by 16 cm
- Type: Byzantine text-type
- Category: V

Minuscule 660 is a Greek minuscule manuscript of the New Testament, written on parchment. It is designated by the siglum 660 in the Gregory-Aland numbering of New Testament manuscripts, and ε 178 in the von Soden numbering of New Testament manuscripts. Using the study of comparative writing styles (palaeography), it has been assigned to the 12th century. The manuscript has one missing portion. Biblical scholar and textual critic Frederick H. A. Scrivener labelled it by 638^{e}.

== Description ==
The manuscript is a codex (precursor to the modern book format), containing the text of the New Testament Gospels, on 341 parchment leaves (sized 22 cm by 16 cm) with only one gap (John 6:60-8:59). This missing portion in John 6:60-8:59 was supplemented by a later hand on new pages. The text is written in one column per page, 21 lines per page, in very small letters.

It contains the Letter to Carpius, the table of contents (known as κεφαλαια / kephalaia) is placed only before the Gospel of Mark. The text is divided according to the chaters (also known as κεφαλαια), whose numbers are placed at the left margin, with their titles (known as τιτλοι / titloi) written at the top of the page. The text of the four Gospels is further divided into the Ammonian Sections (in Mark 237 sections – the last numbered section in 16:15). Lectionary markings are also included in the margin, and numerous pictures, with portraits of the Evangelists amongst them.

== Text ==
The Greek text of the codex is considered to be a representative of the Byzantine text-type. Textual criticm Hermann von Soden classified it as part of his Iota text. BIblical scholar Kurt Aland placed it in Category V of his New Testament manuscript classification system.

According to the Claremont Profile Method (a specific anaylsis of textual data), it belongs to the textual group 22a. It belongs to subgroup 35.

Its text is closely related to the following codices: P Q R Γ 047 0130 4 251 273 440 472 485 495 716 1047 1093 1170 1229 1242 1295 1355 1365 1396 1515 1604. Hermann von Soden designated this group by I'.

== History ==
The manuscript was bought in Constantinople in 1882. It was added to the list of New Testament manuscripts by Scrivener in the third edition of his A Plain Introduction... in 1883. Gregory saw the manuscript in 1887.

Scrivener dated it to the 11th or 12th century, Gregory to the 11th century. The manuscript is currently dated by the INTF to the 12th century. The manuscript is currently housed at the Berlin State Library (shelf number Graec. quarto 66), in Berlin.

== See also ==
- List of New Testament minuscules
- Biblical manuscript
- Textual criticism
