= Codex Tischendorfianus IV =

Uncial 036
- New Testament manuscript
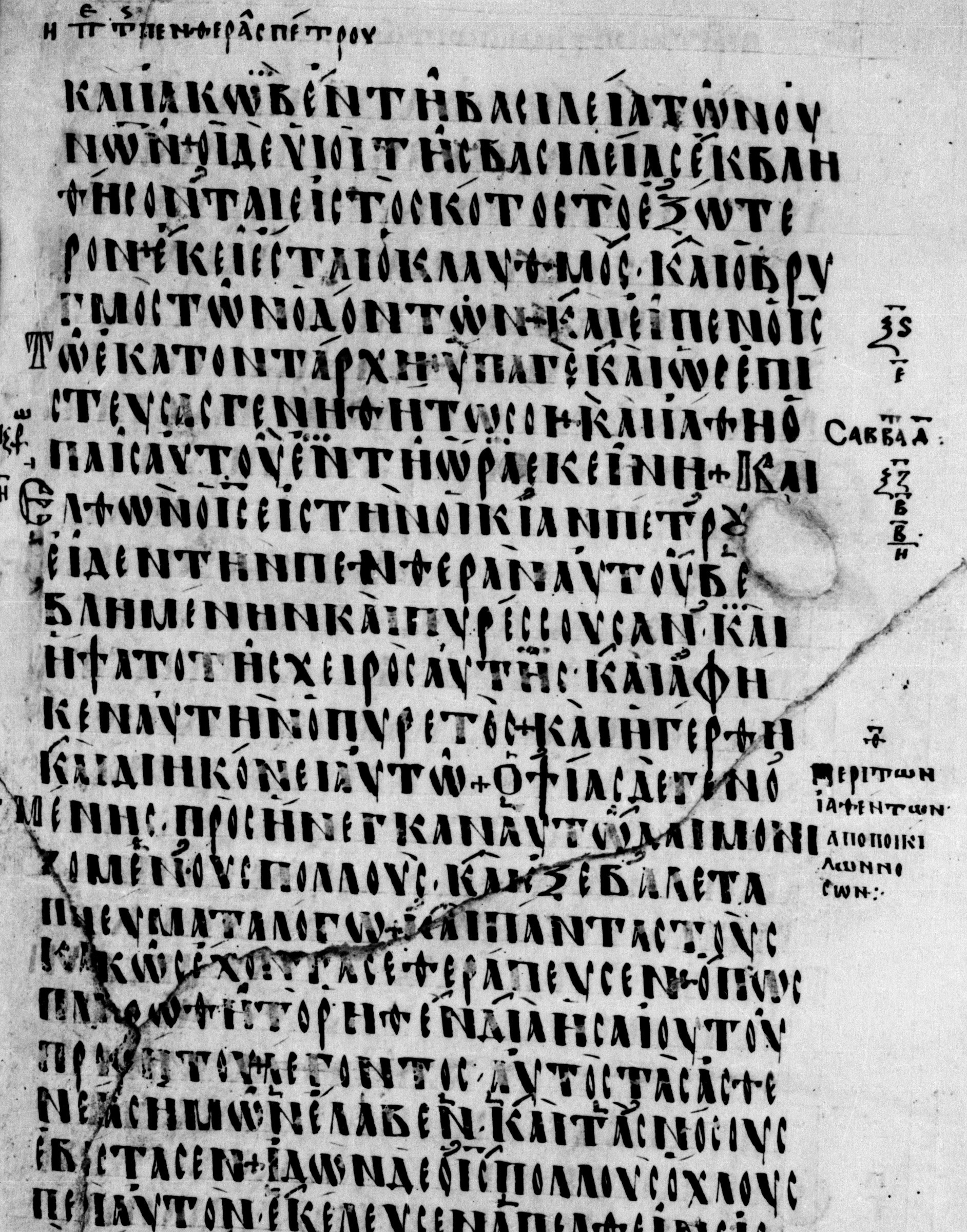
- Matthew 8:11-18 in Cod. Tischendorfianus IV
- Name: Tischendorfianus IV
- Sign: Γ
- Text: Gospels †
- Date: 10th century
- Script: Greek
- Found: Tischendorf, 1853, 1859
- Now at: Bodleian Library; National Library of Russia
- Size: 30 cm by 23 cm
- Type: Byzantine text-type
- Category: V

Codex Tischendorfianus IV – designated by Γ or 036 (in the Gregory-Aland numbering), ε 70 (von Soden) – is a Greek uncial manuscript of the Gospels, dated palaeographically to the 10th century (although 9th century is also possible). The manuscript is lacunose.

== Description ==
The codex contains portions of the four Gospels on 257 parchment leaves (30 centimetres (12 in) by 23 centimetres (9.1 in)) in the Western order: Matthew, John, Luke, and Mark. The text of the codex is written in one column per page, 24 lines per page. The letters are large and lean to the left. The letters have breathings and accents.

The text is divided according to the κεφαλαια (chapters), whose numbers are given at the margin, and the τιτλοι (titles) at the top of the pages. There is also a division according to the smaller Ammonian Sections, with references to the Eusebian Canons (written below Ammonian Section numbers).

It contains the tables of the κεφαλαια (tables of contents) before each Gospel, lectionary markings at the margin (for liturgical use), and musical notes. There are no itacistic errors.

Over the original breathings and accents some later scrawler has, in many places, put others, in a very careless fashion.

At the end of the Gospel of John it has subscription ετελειωθη η δελτος αυτη μηνι νοεμβριω κζ ινδ η ημερα ε ωρα Β. Tischendorf, by the aid of Ant. Pilgrami's Calendarium chronologum medii potissimum aevi monumentis accommodatum (Vienna 1781), states that the only year between 800 and 950, with November 27 on a Thursday, was 844. Another possible year is 979.

Lacunae

The text of the codex has some lacunae in Matthew and in Mark (lacks Matthew 5:31-6:16, 6:30-7:26, 8:27-9:6, 21:19-22:25; Mark 3:34-6:21); Luke and John are complete. It omits Matthew 16:2b–3.

Additions

In Matt. 27:49 codex contains added text: ἄλλος δὲ λαβὼν λόγχην ἒνυξεν αὐτοῦ τὴν πλευράν, καὶ ἐξῆλθεν ὕδορ καὶ αἷμα (the other took a spear and pierced His side, and immediately came out water and blood). This reading was derived from John 19:34 and occurs in other manuscripts of the Alexandrian text-type (א, B, C, L, 1010, 1293, pc, vg^{mss}).

== Text ==
The Greek text of this codex is a representative of the Byzantine text-type. Aland placed it in Category V.

It is close textually to the codices 024, 026, 027, 047, 0130, 4, 251, 273, 440, 472, 485, 495, 660, 716, 1047, 1093, 1170, 1229, 1242, 1295, 1355, 1365, 1396, 1515, 1604. Hermann von Soden designated this group by I'. According to the Claremont Profile Method it represents textual family K^{x} in Luke 1, Luke 10, and Luke 20.

== History ==
One part of the codex was found by Tischendorf in an eastern monastery in 1853, another part in 1859. As a result, the codex is divided and housed in two places. 158 leaves were bought in 1855 and they are housed in the Bodleian Library (Auct. T. infr 2.2) in Oxford and 99 leaves of the codex are located now in the National Library of Russia (Gr. 33) in Saint Petersburg.

The Petersburgian leaves were described by Kurt Treu.

== See also ==
- List of New Testament uncials
- Textual criticism
- Biblical manuscript
