= Lectionary 1602 =

Lectionary ℓ1602
- New Testament manuscript
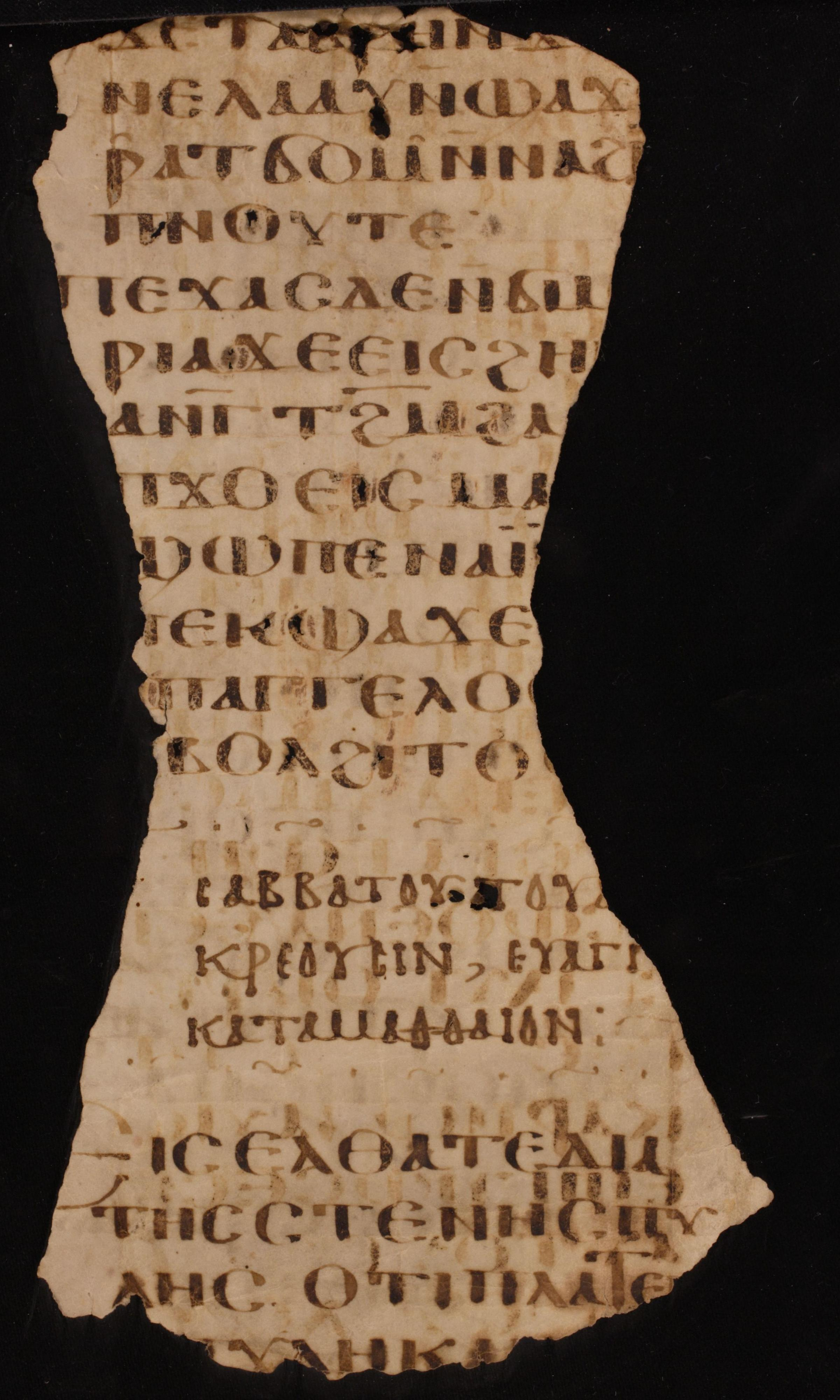
- Coptic text
- Text: Evangelistarion
- Date: 8th century
- Script: Coptic / Greek diglot
- Now at: University of Michigan
- Size: 36.2 by 28.4 cm

Lectionary 1602, designated by ℓ 1602 in the Gregory-Aland numbering, is a Coptic–Greek bilingual manuscript of the New Testament, on parchment leaves, dated paleographically to the 8th century.

== Description ==
The text is written in Greek Uncial letters, on 88 parchment leaves (36.2 by 28.4 cm), in 2 columns per page, and 28 lines per page.

The codex contains Lessons from the four Gospels lectionary (Evangelistarium).

It has two endings to the Gospel of Mark (as in codices Codex Regius Ψ 099 0112 274^{mg} 579).

The codex is now located in the University of Michigan (P. Mich. Inv., Nr. 4942, 1 fol.) in Ann Arbor.

== See also ==
- List of New Testament lectionaries
- Coptic versions of the Bible
- Textual criticism
