= Lectionary 69 =

Lectionary ℓ 69
- New Testament manuscript
- Text: Gospels
- Date: 12th-century
- Script: Greek
- Now at: Bibliothèque nationale de France
- Size: 30.7 cm by 23.3 cm
- Hand: fine
- Note: remarkable readings

Lectionary 69, designated by siglum ℓ 69 (in the Gregory-Aland numbering), is a Greek manuscript of the New Testament, on vellum leaves. Palaeographically it has been assigned to the 12th-century.

== Description ==
The codex contains Lessons from the Gospels of John, Matthew, Luke lectionary (Evangelistarium) with some lacunae. The text is written in Greek minuscule letters, on 257 parchment leaves (30.7 cm by 23.3 cmm), 2 columns per page, 25 lines per page. Some leaves which were lost were supplied by later hand. The text of John 8:3-11 is included. It has standard lectionary text. It has some errors corrected by a later hand.

In Mark 6:33 it has textual reading ἐκεῖ καὶ προῆλθον αὐτούς along with Codex Sinaiticus, Codex Vaticanus, 0187 (omit εκει), 892, ℓ 49, ℓ 70, ℓ 299, ℓ 303, ℓ 333, ℓ 1579, (ℓ 950 αυτους), it^{aur}, vg, (cop^{sa, bo}).

== History ==
The manuscript was written in Constantinople. It was examined by Scholz, and added by him to the list of New Testament manuscripts. It was examined and described by Paulin Martin. C. R. Gregory saw it in 1885.

The manuscript is cited in the critical editions of the Greek New Testament (UBS3).

Currently the codex is located in the Bibliothèque nationale de France (Gr. 286) in Paris.

== See also ==
- List of New Testament lectionaries
- Biblical manuscript
- Textual criticism
