= Lectionary 70 =

Lectionary ℓ 70
- New Testament manuscript
- Text: Evangelistarion
- Date: 12th-century
- Script: Greek
- Found: 1669
- Now at: Bibliothèque nationale de France
- Size: 34.4 cm by 26.9 cm

Lectionary 70, designated by siglum ℓ 70 (in the Gregory-Aland numbering), is a Greek manuscript of the New Testament, on vellum leaves. Palaeographically it has been assigned to the 12th-century.

== Description ==
The codex contains Lessons from the Gospels of John, Matthew, Luke lectionary (Evangelistarium) with some lacunae at the beginning and end. The lacking leaves were supplied by a later hand. It is written in Greek minuscule letters, on 313 parchment leaves (34.4 cm by 26.9 cm), 2 columns per page, 25-26 lines per column. The text of John 8:3-11 is included.

In Mark 6:33 it has textual reading ἐκεῖ καὶ προῆλθον αὐτούς along with Codex Sinaiticus, Codex Vaticanus, 0187 (omit εκει), 892, ℓ 49, ℓ 69, ℓ 299, ℓ 303, ℓ 333, ℓ 1579, (ℓ 950 αυτους), it^{aur}, vg, (cop^{sa, bo}).

In Mark 10:7 it has unique reading μητερα (mother) instead of γυναικα (wife).

A few paper leaves at the beginnings and end were added later.

== History ==
Currently the manuscript is dated by the INTF to the 12th-century.

The manuscript was brought from the East in 1669. It was partially examined by Scholz. It was examined and described by Paulin Martin. C. R. Gregory saw it in 1885.

The manuscript is cited in the critical editions of the Greek New Testament (UBS3).

Currently the codex is located in the Bibliothèque nationale de France (Gr. 288) in Paris.

== See also ==
- List of New Testament lectionaries
- Biblical manuscript
- Textual criticism

== Bibliography ==
- Jean-Pierre-Paul Martin, Description technique des manuscrits grecs relatifs au N. T., conservés dans les bibliothèques des Paris (Paris 1883), p. 150.
