= Uncial 099 =

- New Testament manuscript
- Text: Gospel of Mark 16 †
- Date: 7th-century
- Script: Greek
- Now at: Bibliothèque nationale de France
- Size: 32. x 26 cm
- Type: mixed
- Category: III

Uncial 099 (in the Gregory-Aland numbering), ε 47 (Soden); is a Greek uncial manuscript of the New Testament, assigned paleographically to the 7th-century.

== Description ==
The codex contains a small part of the Gospel of Mark 16:6-8; shorter ending; 16:9-18, on one thick parchment leaf (32 by 26 cm). The text is written in two columns per page, 32 lines per page, in large uncial letters.

It has two endings to the Gospel of Mark (as in codices Ψ 0112 274^{mg} 579 Lectionary 1602).

The Greek text of this codex is mixed. Kurt Aland placed it in Category III.

In Mark 16:14 it reads εγηγερμενον along with C^{3} D K L W Θ Π Ψ 099 700 1010 2174 Byz Lect.

Currently it is dated by the INTF to the 7th-century.

The codex is located now at the Bibliothèque nationale de France (Copt. 129,8), in Paris.

== See also ==
- List of New Testament uncials
- Textual criticism
- Gospel of Mark
