= Minuscule 274 =

- New Testament manuscript
- Text: Gospels
- Date: 10th century
- Script: Greek
- Now at: Bibliothèque nationale de France
- Size: 23.8 cm by 16.6 cm
- Type: Byzantine text-type
- Category: none
- Note: K^{x}

Minuscule 274 (in the Gregory-Aland numbering), ε 1024 (Soden), is a Greek minuscule manuscript of the New Testament, on parchment. Paleographically it has been assigned to the 10th century. It has marginalia.

== Description ==
The codex contains the text of the four Gospels on 232 parchment leaves (22 cm by 16 cm) with some lacunae. The texts of Mark 1:1-17; 6:21-54; John 1:1-20; 3:18-4:1; 7:23-42; 9:10-27; 18:12-29 were supplied by a later hand on a paper. The text is written in one column per page, in 26 lines per page.

The text is divided according to the κεφαλαια (chapters) whose numbers are given at the margin, and their τιτλοι (titles of chapters) at the top of the pages. There is also another division according to the smaller Ammonian Sections (in Mark 239 sections, the last in 16:17), but without references to the Eusebian Canons.

It contains lectionary markings at the margin, incipits, music notes, Synaxarion, Menologion, and pictures.

== Text ==
The Greek text of the codex is a representative of the Byzantine text-type. Hermann von Soden included it to the textual family K^{x}. Aland did not place it in any Category.

According to the Claremont Profile Method it represents textual family K^{x} in Luke 1 and Luke 20. In Luke 10 no profile was made.

The passage Matthew 16:2b–3 is excluded. The manuscript has two endings to the Gospel of Mark (as in codices Ψ 099 0112 579 Lectionary 1602).

== History ==
The manuscript once belonged to Maximus Panagiotes. The manuscript was added to the list of New Testament manuscripts by Scholz (1794-1852). Dean Burgon regarded it as a specimen between uncial and cursive writing. It was examined and described by Paulin Martin. C. R. Gregory saw the manuscript in 1885.

The manuscript is currently housed at the Bibliothèque nationale de France (Suppl. Gr. 79) at Paris.

== See also ==
- List of New Testament minuscules
- Biblical manuscript
- Textual criticism
