= Lectionary 303 =

Lectionary ℓ 303
- New Testament manuscript
- Text: Evangelistarium
- Date: 12th century
- Script: Greek
- Now at: Princeton Theological Seminary
- Size: 31.6 cm by 27 cm
- Type: Byzantine text-type

Lectionary 303 (Gregory-Aland), designated by siglum ℓ 303 in the Gregory-Aland numbering, is a 12th-century Greek manuscript of the New Testament, on parchment. The manuscript has complex contents.

== Description ==
The original codex contained lessons from the Gospel of John, Matthew, and Luke (Evangelistarium), on 340 parchment leaves. The leaves measure (31.6 cm by 27 cm).

The text is written in Greek minuscule letters, in two columns per page, 22–23 lines per page. The manuscript contains weekday Gospel lessons.

It also contains Synaxarion and Menologion, both written in one column per page, 20 lines per column. The Menologion follows the civil calendar month by month.

In Mark 6:33 it has textual reading ἐκεῖ καὶ προῆλθον αὐτούς along with Codex Sinaiticus, Codex Vaticanus, 0187 (omit εκει), 892, ℓ 49, ℓ 69, ℓ 70, ℓ 299, ℓ 333, ℓ 1579, (ℓ 950 αυτους), it^{aur}, vg, (cop^{sa, bo}).

== History ==
Caspar René Gregory dated the manuscript to the 12th or 13th century. It is presently assigned to the 12th century on palaeographic grounds by the Institute for New Testament Textual Research.

In the 14th century it was presented by Presbyter Abul Fath, son of Presbyter Abul Badr, to the Church of Mar Saba in the Alexandrian diocese. Then it belonged to the Iviron monastery on the Athos peninsula. It was brought to Paris by the Russian general and art collector Count Petr Ivanovich Sevastianov (Sebastianoff); and in 1885 it was brought to America. A colophon in Greek and Arabic on folio 1 verso declares: "No one has authority from God to take it away under condition, and whoever transgress this will be under the wrath of the eternal Word of God, whose power is great. Gregory, Patriarch by the grace of God, wrote this."

The manuscript was added to the list of New Testament manuscripts by Scrivener (491^{e}) and by Gregory (number 303^{e}). It was examined by Bruce M. Metzger and was the subject of his Ph.D. dissertation at Princeton University in 1942, "Studies in a Greek Gospel Lectionary (Greg. 303)."

The manuscript is cited in the critical editions of the Greek New Testament (UBS3).

Currently the codex is housed at the Princeton Theological Seminary (Speer Library, 11.21.1900) in Princeton.

== See also ==
- List of New Testament lectionaries
- Biblical manuscript
- Textual criticism
- Lectionary 302

== Bibliography ==
- Gregory, Caspar René (1900). Textkritik des Neuen Testaments. Vol. 1. Leipzig: J.C. Hinrichs’sche Buchhandlung. p. 413.
- K. Clark, Descriptive catalogue of Greek New Testament manuscripts in America (1937), pp. 175–176.
- Caspar René Gregory, The Independent (New York, 15 October 1888), 111.
- Bruce M. Metzger, Manuscripts of the Greek Bible: An Introduction to Palaeography, Oxford University Press, Oxford 1981, p. 124, 125 (Plate 38).
