= Minuscule 579 =

- New Testament manuscript
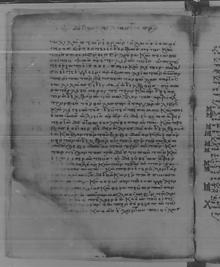
- Folio 6 verso with text of Matthew 4:15-24
- Text: Gospels †
- Date: 13th century
- Script: Greek
- Now at: National Library of France
- Size: 23.3 cm by 16.2 cm
- Type: Alexandrian text-type
- Category: II

Minuscule 579 is a Greek minuscule manuscript of the New Testament Gospels, written on parchment. It is designated by the siglum 579 in the Gregory-Aland numbering of New Testament manuscripts, and ε 376 (in the von Soden numbering of New Testament manuscripts.

Using the study of comparative writing styles (palaeography), it has been dated to the 13th century. It was formerly labelled as 80^{e} in the manuscript list of biblical scholar Frederick H.A. Scrivener. The manuscript has some missing portions of text.

== Description ==
The manuscript is a codex (precursor to the modern book format), containing the near-complete text of the four Gospels, with some gaps (Mark 3:28-4:8, and John 20:15-21:25 are no longer in the manuscript, due to missing pages) on 152 parchment leaves, sized 23.3 cm by 16.2 cm. The text is written in one column per page, 28-39 lines per page. Words are written continuously without any separation, but includes accents (used to indicate voiced pitch changes) and breathings (utilised to designate vowel emphasis).

It contains lists of the tables of contents (known as κεφαλαια / kephalaia) before each Gospel, numbers of the chapters (also called κεφαλαια) in the margin, and the titles (known as τιτλοι / titloi) at the top of the pages. It has the Ammonian sections (an early system of dividing the four Gospels into different sections; 233 sections in Mark, up to Mark 16:5), but no references to the Eusebian Canons (a development of the Ammonian sections).

Quotations from the Old Testament are rarely indicated. It has the same system of chapter divisions as found in Codex Vaticanus (B) and Codex Zacynthius (Ξ).

== Text ==
The Greek text of the codex is considered to be a representative of the Alexandrian text-type in Mark and Luke. The text-types are groups of different New Testament manuscripts which share specific or generally related readings, which then differ from each other group, and thus the conflicting readings can separate out the groups. These are then used to determine the original text as published; there are three main groups with names: Alexandrian, Western, and Byzantine. For the text of Mark and Luke contained in the manuscript, biblical scholar and text-critic Kurt Aland placed it in Category II in his New Testament manuscript text classification system. Category II manuscripts are described as being manuscripts "of a special quality, i.e., manuscripts with a considerable proportion of the early text, but which are marked by alien influences. These influences are usually of smoother, improved readings, and in later periods by infiltration by the Byzantine text." The relationship between minuscule 579's text of Luke and the Alexandrian text-type was confirmed by the Claremont Profile Method (a specific analysis method of textual data), though in Luke 10 and Luke 20 it is a weak representative of this text-type. In Matthew its text belongs to the late Byzantine group.

The text of Matthew 16:2b–3 (Signs of the Times) is placed after verse 9. It has two endings to the Gospel of Mark, as also seen in codices Codex Athous Lavrensis (Ψ), Uncial 099, Uncial 0112, minuscule 274 (contained within the margin), and Lectionary 1602 (ℓ 1602).

It lacks the text of Luke 22:43-44 and the phrase ὁ δὲ Ἰησοῦς ἔλεγον Πάτερ, ἄφες αὐτοῖς, οὐ γὰρ οἴδασιν τί ποιοῦσιν (But Jesus said, "Father, forgive them, for they do not know what they do") in Luke 23:34. In John 8:6 it inserts μὴ προσποιούμενος (taking no notice) after εἰς τὴν γὴν (in the ground) along with Codex Cyprius (K) and numerous manuscripts among the Byzantine text-type.

== History ==
The manuscript once belonged to classical scholar Johann Georg Graevius, and was collated by Dutch scholar Anthony Bynaeus in 1691 (as minuscule 80). It passed into the hands of J. van der Hagen, who showed it to textual-critic Johann Jakob Wettstein in 1739. It was bought by Ambrose Didot and sold to Monsieur Lesoef.

The manuscript was examined and described by Catholic biblical scholar Paulin Martin. C. R. Gregory saw the manuscript in 1884. It is currently housed in at the National Library of France (Gr. 97), at Paris.

== See also ==
- List of New Testament minuscules
- Biblical manuscript
- Textual criticism
