= Minuscule 152 =

- New Testament manuscript
- Text: Gospels
- Date: 13th century
- Script: Greek
- Now at: Vatican Library
- Size: 21.7 cm by 16 cm
- Type: Byzantine text-type
- Category: none
- Note: marginalia

Minuscule 152 (in the Gregory-Aland numbering), ε 303 (Soden), is a Greek minuscule manuscript of the New Testament, on parchment leaves. Palaeographically it has been assigned to the 13th century. It has complex contents, and full marginalia.

== Description ==
The codex contains a complete text of the four Gospels on 315 parchment leaves (size 21.7 cm by 16 cm). The text is written in one column per page, in 20 lines per page. The ink is brown-black, the initial letters in blue.

It contains the tables of κεφαλαια (tables of contents) before each Gospel, numbers of the κεφαλαια (chapters) at the margin of the text, the τιτλοι (titles of chapters) at the top of the pages, and pictures. It has no prolegomena.

The text of John's ending on 21:24, and verse 25 were added by a later hand.

== Text ==
It is similar to the codex 16. Aland did not place it in any Category. According to the Claremont Profile Method in Luke 1; 10; and 20 it belongs to the group 1216 and creates a pair with 555.

== History ==
It is dated by the INTF to the 13th century.

The manuscript was examined by Birch (about 1782) and Scholz. C. R. Gregory saw the manuscript in 1886.

It is currently housed at the Vatican Library (Pal. gr. 227), at Rome.

== See also ==
- List of New Testament minuscules
- Biblical manuscript
- Textual criticism
