= Uncial 050 =

- New Testament manuscript
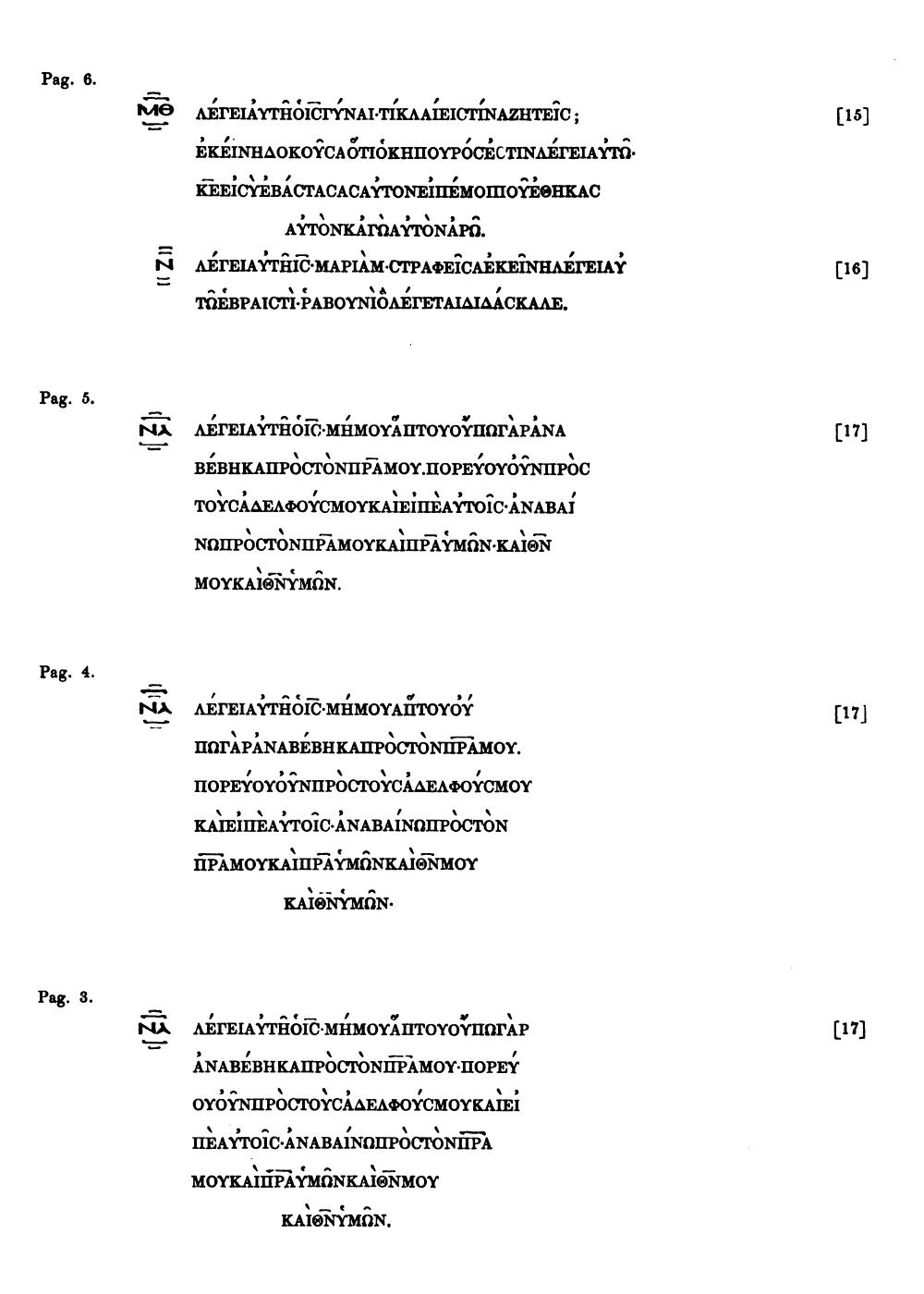
- Text: Gospel of John
- Date: 9th-century
- Script: Greek
- Found: 1863 Brandshaw
- Now at: Dionysiou monastery State Historical Museum; National Library of Greece; Christ Church, Oxford
- Size: 32.5 cm by 24 cm
- Type: mixed
- Category: III

Uncial 050 (in the Gregory-Aland numbering), C^{ι1} (von Soden), is a Greek uncial manuscript of the New Testament, written on parchment. Palaeographically it has been assigned to the 9th century. Formerly it was labelled by O or W^{e}.

== Description ==
The codex contains the text of the Gospel of John, with a numerous lacunae, on 19 parchment leaves (32.5 cm by 24 cm). Some leaves have survived in a fragmentary condition. The text is written in one column per page, 5-9 lines per page, 17-24 letters in line. The uncial letters are large. It has breathings and accents.

The biblical text is surrounded by a catena. The text of commentary is written in minuscule.

It contains text John 1:1.3-4; 2:17-3:8.12-13.20-22, 4:7-14, 20:10-13.15-17.

Verse 21:25 is repeated twice and 20:17 even thrice.

== Text ==
The Greek text of the codex is mixed with the Byzantine, Alexandrian, and Western readings. Several times it concurs with Papyrus 75 (John 2:17; 3:12 etc.). Aland placed it in Category III.

In John 3:12 it has textual variant πιστευετε (you believe) – instead of πιστευσετε (you will believe) – along with the manuscripts Papyrus 75 and Uncial 083.

== History ==
Possibly the codex was written in Athos peninsula. The Moscow fragment was brought from the Dionysiou monastery.

The fragment John 4:7-14 (three leaves) was discovered by Bradshaw in 1863. Kitchin show it for Tischendorf (1865).

It was examined by Tregelles.

The codex is divided and located in four places. 2 leaves are housed at the Εθνική Βιβλιοθήκη (1371) in Athens, 7 leaves in the Dionysiou monastery 2 (71), in Athos, 7 leaves in the State Historical Museum (V. 29, S. 119), and 3 leaves in the Christ Church (Wake 2,3).

== See also ==
- List of New Testament uncials
- Textual criticism
