= Minuscule 377 =

- New Testament manuscript
- Text: Gospels
- Date: 16th century
- Script: Greek
- Now at: Vatican Library
- Size: 30.6 cm by 20.9 cm
- Category: none

Minuscule 377 (in the Gregory-Aland numbering), A^{501} (Soden), is a Greek minuscule manuscript of the New Testament, on paper. Palaeographically, it has been assigned to the 16th century.

== Description ==
The codex contains the text of the four Gospels on 339 paper leaves (30.6 cm by 20.9 cm). The text is written in one column per page, in 30 lines per page.

The text of Matthew is surrounded by a catena, the other Gospels with questions and answers (ερωταποκρ).

== Text ==
Kurt Aland did not place the Greek text of the codex in any Category. According to the Claremont Profile Method it has mixed text in Luke 1 and Luke 20. In Luke 10 it is a mixture of the Byzantine families.

== History ==
Scrivener and Gregory dated the manuscript to the 15th century. Currently the INTF dates it to the 16th century.

The manuscript was added to the list of New Testament manuscripts by Scholz (1794–1852). C. R. Gregory saw it in 1886.

The manuscript is currently housed at the Vatican Library (Vat. gr. 1618) in Rome.

== See also ==
- List of New Testament minuscules
- Biblical manuscript
- Textual criticism
