= Minuscule 2766 =

- New Testament manuscript
- Text: Gospels
- Date: 13th century
- Script: Greek
- Now at: Duke University
- Size: 19.6 cm by 15.5 cm
- Category: none

Minuscule 2766 (in the Gregory-Aland numbering), is a Greek minuscule manuscript of the New Testament, written on 147 parchment leaves (19.6 cm by 15.5 cm). Paleographically it has been assigned to the 13th century.

== Description ==
The codex contains the complete text of the four Gospels. The text is written in one column per page, in 20 lines per page. Titles are written in red uncial letters. The title in Mark is written in red semi-uncial letters, but in the rest of the Gospels in red uncial letters. It contains the Eusebian Canons in red.

The Greek text of the codex represents the Byzantine text-type. Kurt Aland did not place it in any Category. According to the Claremont Profile Method it has Kmix/Cl827/Cl827.

== History ==
The codex now is located in the Kenneth Willis Clark Collection of the Duke University (Gk MS 31) at Durham.

== See also ==
- List of New Testament minuscules
- Biblical manuscripts
- Textual criticism
