= Minuscule 555 =

- New Testament manuscript
- Text: Gospels
- Date: 15th century
- Script: Greek
- Now at: Cambridge University Library
- Size: 20.1 cm by 14.5 cm
- Type: mixed
- Category: none

Minuscule 555 (in the Gregory-Aland numbering), ε 519 (in the Soden numbering), is a Greek minuscule manuscript of the New Testament, on a paper. Palaeographically it has been assigned to the 15th century. Scrivener labelled it by number 609.

== Description ==
The codex contains a complete text of the four Gospels on 185 paper leaves (size 20.1 cm by 14.5 cm). The writing is in one column per page, 19-25 lines per page. It contains Prolegomena, tables of the κεφαλαια are placed before every Gospel, and subscriptions at the end of the Gospels.

== Text ==
The Greek text of the codex Aland did not place in any Category. According to the Claremont Profile Method in Luke 1; 10; and 20 it belongs to the group 1216 and creates a pair with 152.

== History ==
Currently the manuscript is housed at the Cambridge University Library (Hh. 6.12) in Cambridge.

The manuscripts was added to the list of the New Testament minuscule manuscripts by F. H. A. Scrivener (609) and C. R. Gregory (555).

== See also ==
- List of New Testament minuscules
- Biblical manuscript
- Textual criticism
