= Minuscule 740 =

- New Testament manuscript
- Text: Gospels
- Date: 1318
- Script: Greek
- Now at: Bibliothèque nationale de France
- Size: 24.9 cm by 17.5 cm
- Type: ?
- Category: none
- Note: commentary

Minuscule 740 (in the Gregory-Aland numbering), Θ^{ε410} (von Soden), is a Greek minuscule manuscript of the New Testament written on paper. It is dated by a colophon to 1318 CE. The manuscript has complex contents. Scrivener labelled it as 761^{e}.

== Description ==
The codex contains the text of the four Gospels on 444 paper leaves (size 24.9 cm by 17.5 cm). According to Scrivener it has 441 leaves. The text of Matthew 1:1-2:18 was supplied by a later hand.

The text is written in one column per page, 33-37 lines per page.

The text is divided according to the κεφαλαια (chapters), whose numbers are given at the margin, and their τιτλοι (titles) at the top. According to Gregory there is also another division according to the smaller Ammonian Sections.

It contains lectionary markings and Synaxarion (liturgical book). It has a commentary of Theophylact.

== Text ==
Aland did not place the Greek text of the codex in any Category.

It was not examined by using the Claremont Profile Method.

== History ==
Martin and after him Scrivener dated the manuscript to the 12th or 13th century; Gregory dated it to the 14th or 15th century. According to the colophon the manuscript was written in 1318. The name of scribe was John (?), from Chalcedon (?).

The manuscript was added to the list of New Testament manuscripts by Scrivener (761) and Gregory (740). It was examined and described by Paulin Martin. Gregory saw the manuscript in 1885.

The manuscript is now housed at the Bibliothèque nationale de France (Gr. 234) in Paris.

== See also ==
- List of New Testament minuscules
- Biblical manuscript
- Textual criticism
