= Uncial 064 =

Uncial 64
- New Testament manuscript
- Text: Matthew and Mark
- Date: c. 550
- Script: Greek
- Now at: Kyiv, Sinai, Saint Petersburg
- Size: 28 x 21 cm
- Type: Byzantine text-type
- Category: V

Uncial 064 designated by (in the Gregory-Aland numbering), ε 10 (von Soden), is a Greek uncial codex of the New Testament, on parchment leaves. Formerly it was labelled by Θ^{e}. Palimpsest.

== Description ==
The manuscript contains the gospels of Matt 25:15 — Mark 5:20. Paleographically it has been assigned to the 6th century. The text is written in two columns per page, 25 lines per page. At the time Caspar René Gregory originally allocated numbers to manuscripts, it was not known with certainty that uncials 064, 074 and 090 were from the one manuscript, because they are held in three locations:

codex 064 in Vernadsky National Library of Ukraine (Petrov 17), Kyiv
codex 074 in Saint Catherine's Monastery (Harris 10)
codex 090 in National Library of Russia, Saint Petersburg (Gr. 276).

It is a palimpsest. The upper text contains Syriac liturgica.

The Greek text of these codecs are a representatives of the Byzantine text-type. Aland placed it in Category V.

Currently the manuscript is dated by the INTF to the 6th century.

== Сontents ==
- codex 064 — 2 leaves — Matt 27:7-30;
- codex 074 – 10 leaves — Mt 25; 26; 28 (fragments) (Sinai Harris 10);
- codex 090 – 4 leaves — Mt 26:59-70; 27:44-56; Mk 1:34-2:12.

== See also ==
- List of New Testament uncials
- Textual criticism
- Biblical manuscript

== Bibliography ==
- C. R. Gregory, Textkritik des Neuen Testamentes III (J.C. Hinrichs’sche Buchhandlung: Leipzig 1909), pp. 1363–1368.
- Kurt Treu, Remarks on some Uncial Fragments of the Greek NT, in Studia evangelica III, T & U 88 (Berlin, 1964), pp. 111–112.
