= Minuscule 544 =

- New Testament manuscript
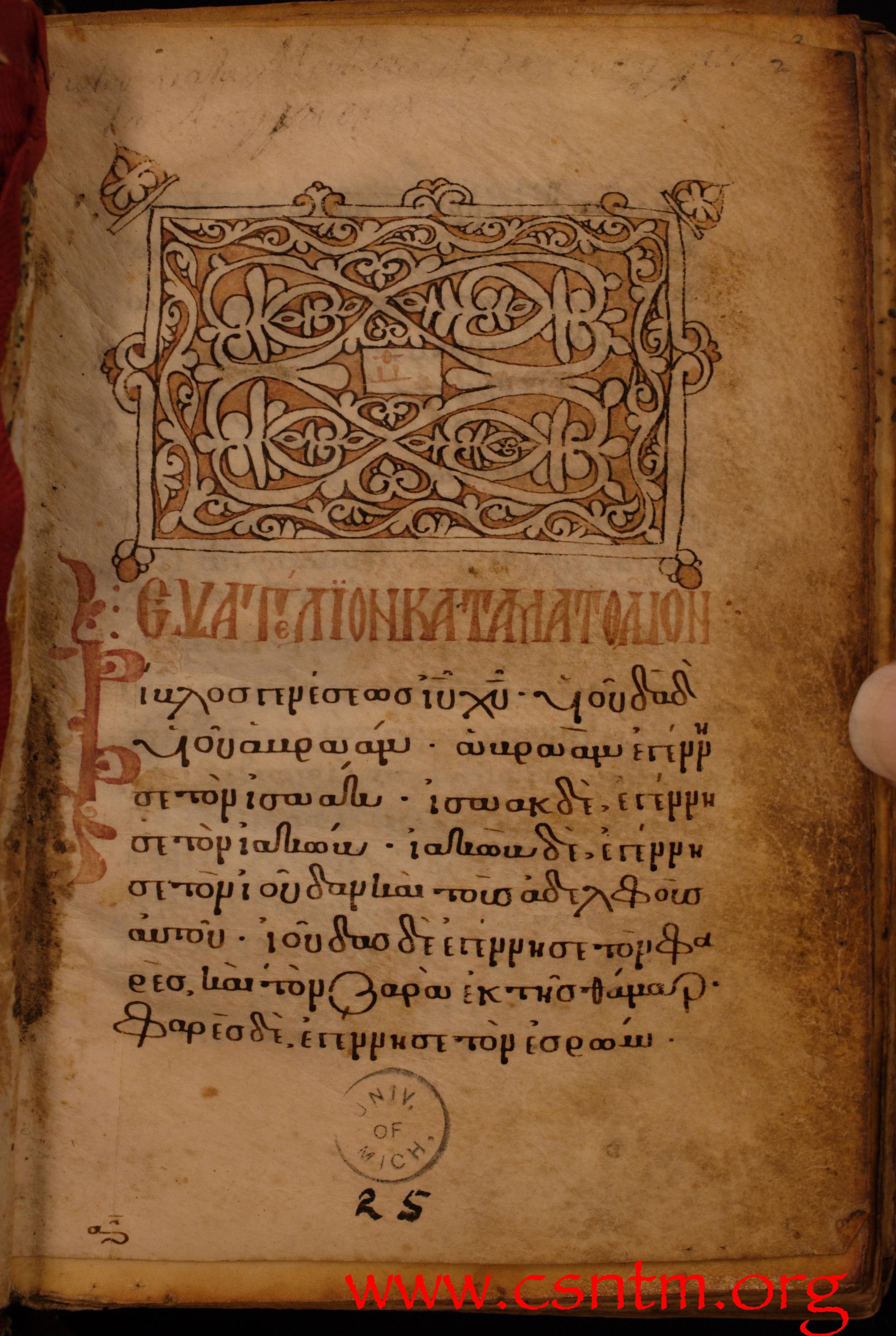
- The first page of Matthew; the decorated headpiece
- Text: Gospels
- Date: 13th century
- Script: Greek
- Now at: University of Michigan
- Size: 13 cm by 9 cm
- Type: Byzantine text-type / mixed
- Category: none
- Hand: neatly written
- Note: marginalia

Minuscule 544 is a Greek minuscule manuscript of the New Testament Gospels, written on parchment. It is designated by the siglum 544 in the Gregory-Aland numbering of New Testament manuscripts, and ε337 in the von Soden numbering of New Testament manuscripts. The manuscript has complex contents. Using the study of comparartive writing styles (palaeography), it has been assigned to the 13th century. It was not adapted for liturgical use. Biblical scholar Frederick H. A. Scrivener labelled it as 557.

It came from Epeiros and is currently housed at the University of Michigan. It was digitised and is available online.

== Description ==
The manuscript is a codex (precursor to the modern book format), containing the text of the four Gospels written on 256 parchment leaves (size 13 cm by 9 cm). The text is written in one column per page, 22 lines per page. It is neatly written in a minute hand. The style of writing has been considered to resemble the same in codex 542 (Scrivener's 555).

The text is divided according to the chapters (known as κεφαλαια / kephalaia), whose numerals are given in the margin written in red ink, with the titles (known as τιτλοι / titloi) written at the top and bottom of the pages. There is also a division according to the smaller Ammonian Sections (in Mark 235 Sections, the last section in 16:12) in red, but no references to the Eusebian Canons (both early divisions of the Gospels into sections). The κεφαλαια and the Ammonian Sections are often put in wrong places. There are no lectionary markings at the margin for liturgical use.

It contains lists of the chapters (also known as κεφαλαια) to the last three Gospels, and pictures of the Evangelists: Matthew, Mark, and John. Decorated head-pieces stand at the beginning of each Gospel. It does not have lectionary markings in the margin (for liturgical use). It contains the nomina sacra contracted in the usual way.

Errors

Errors of iotacism (especially ει or ι for η, ο for ω, and vice versa) are rare in the first two Gospels, but more frequent afterwards. The omissions by homoioteleuton (meaning "the same endings") are frequent (e.g. Matthew 10:37; Mark 9:43-46; 10:27.42; 12:39; 14:19; 15:14; Luke 10:27; John 3:31; 4:5; 5:32; 6:11.32.42; 8:14; 9:7; 12:34; 13:34; 14:17; 17:21). Removal of the final-nu is very common, and though the punctuation is accurate, the sign of interrogation never occurs.

This copy was transcribed from an older copy which was defective in Luke. It has an unusual number of variations from the ordinary text, though none of the first rate of importance.

== Text ==
Scholar Hermann von Soden classified the Greek text of the codex to his group I^{a}. Biblical scholar Kurt Aland did not place it in any Category of his New Testament manuscript classification system. According to the Claremont Profile Method (a specific analysis of textual data), it has an eclectic text. In Luke 1 it represents Π^{a}, in Luke 10 a mixed Byzantine text, and in Luke 20 it reflects the text of K^{x}.

Some notable readings

Matthew 2:19 — εν Αιγυπτω ] omitted
Matthew 12:40 — καρδια ] κοιλια
Matthew 16:21 — απο ] παρα
Matthew 17:22 — ανθρωπων ] ανθρωπων αμαρτωλων
Matthew 18:25 — ακρασιας ] αδικιας
Matthew 18:28 — ανομιας ] αδικιας
Mark 1:2 — εν τω ησαια τω προφητη ] εν βιβλω λογων ησαιου του προφητου
Mark 8:14 — οπου ου δει ] εν τοπω αγνω
Mark 14:3 — πιστικης ] μυστικης
Mark 15:8 — καθως αει εποιει αυτοις ] τον βαραββαν (similar to Θ 565, and 700)
Luke 1:48 — της δουλης ] του δουλου
Luke 1:48 — κατα το ρημα σου ] omitted
Luke 3:25 — του Μααθ του Ματταθιου ] omitted
John 16:13 — το π̅ν̅α̅ της αληθειας ] omitted
John 19:38 — του ι̅υ̅ ] του κ̅υ̅

== History ==
Location

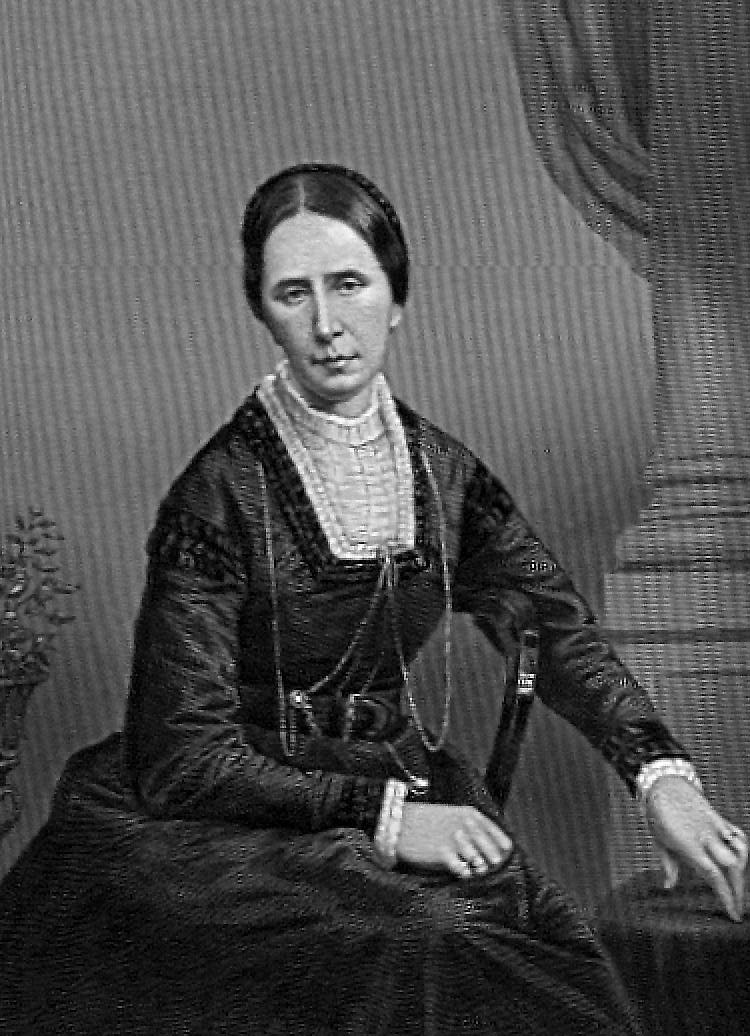
The Lady Burdett-Coutts

Nothing is known of the codex's history until the year 1864, when it was in the possession of a dealer at Janina in Epeiros. It was then purchased from him by a representative of Baroness Burdett-Coutts (1814–1906), a philanthropist, along with other Greek manuscripts (among them codices 532-546). They were transported to England in 1870-1871.

The manuscript was presented by Burdett-Coutts to Sir Roger Cholmely's School, and was housed at the Highgate (Burdett-Coutts III. 9), in London. In 1922 it was acquired for the University of Michigan. It is currently housed at the University of Michigan (shelf number Ms. 25) in Ann Arbor.

Examination

It was added to the list of New Testament manuscripts by scholars Scrivener and Caspar René Gregory. Gregory saw it in 1883.

Scrivener examined, described and collated its text. His collation was edited posthumous in Adversaria critica sacra in 1893. It is rarely cited in the critical editions of the Greek New Testament.

== Gallery ==
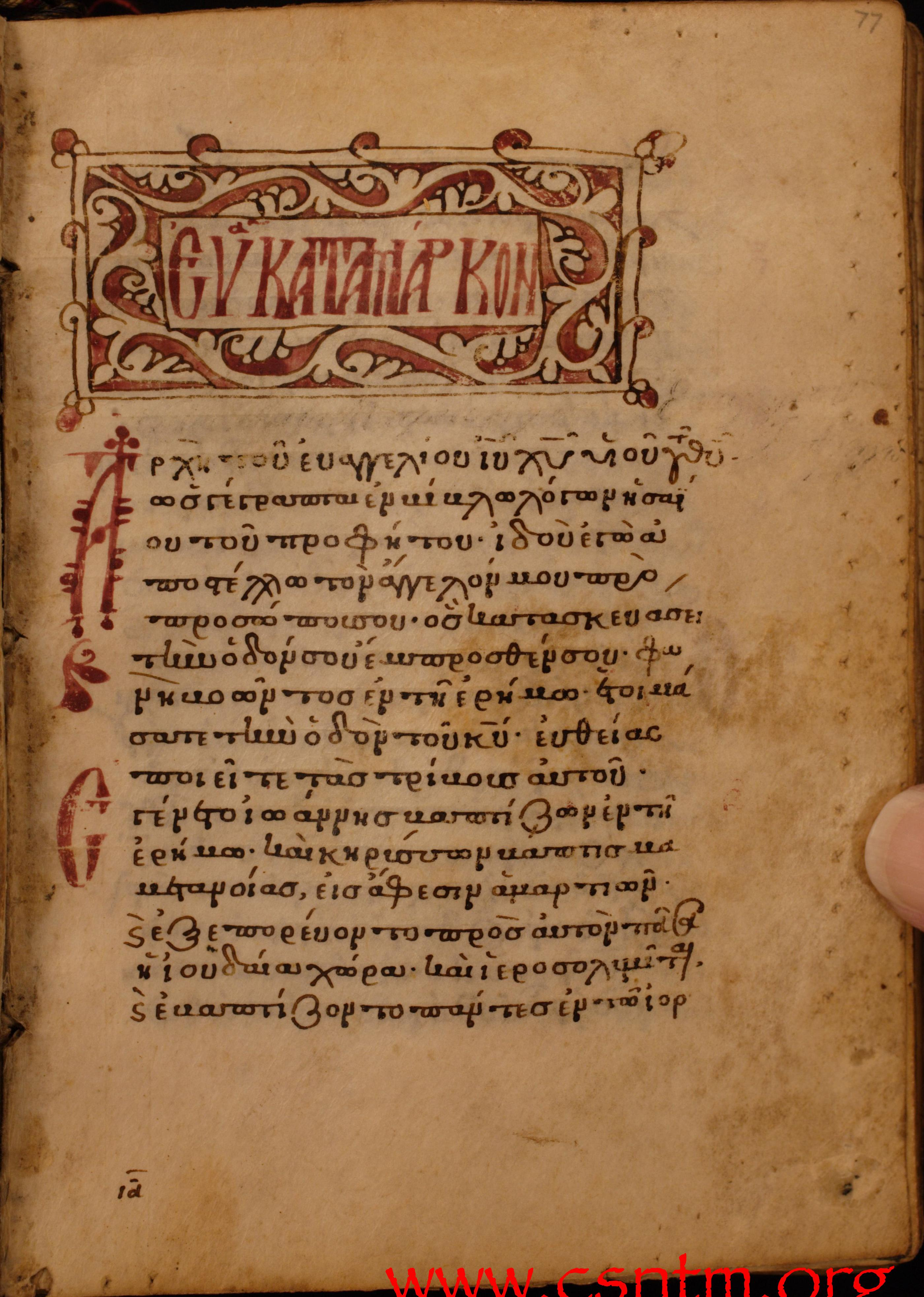
The first page of Mark with decorated headpiece

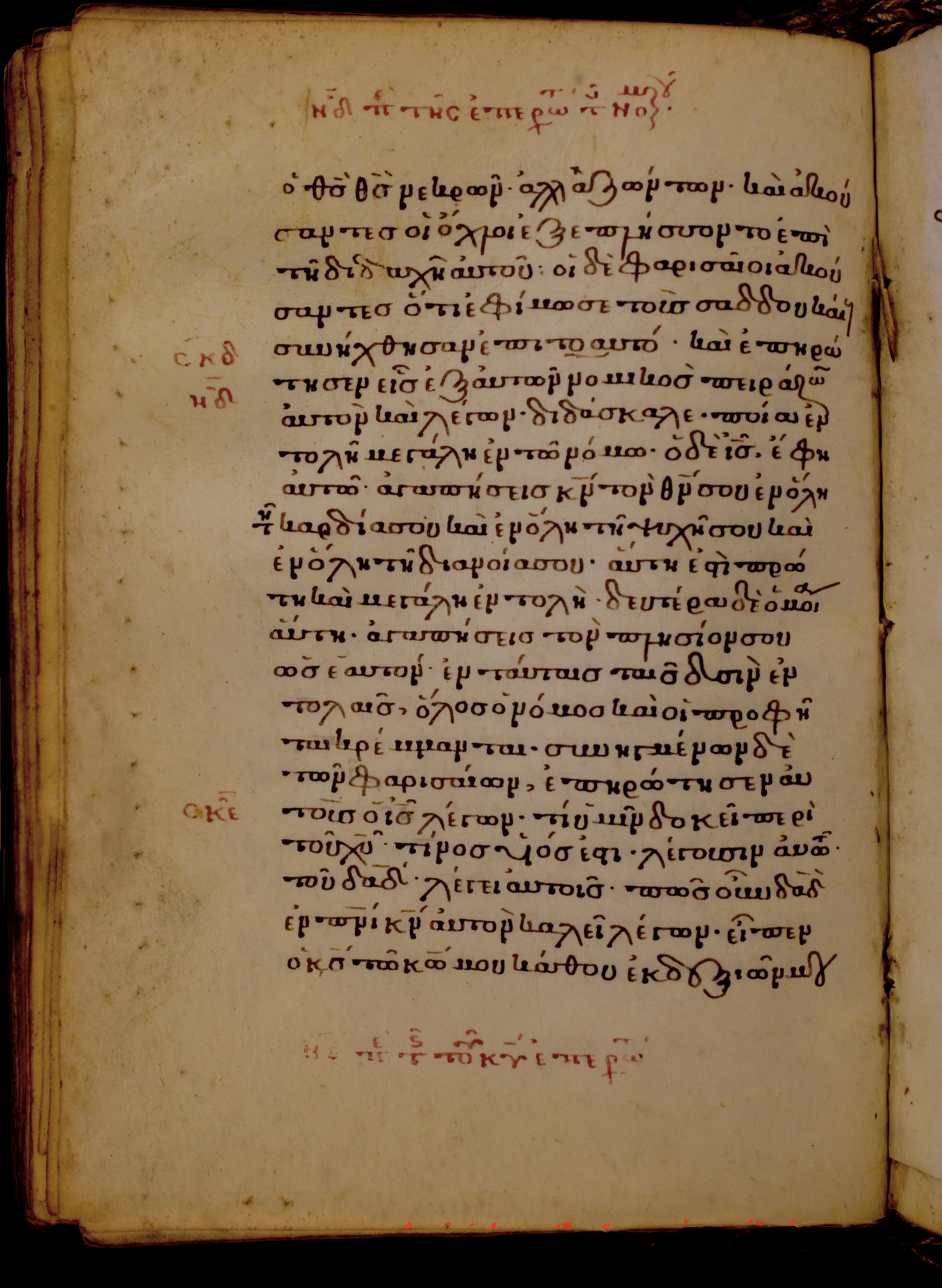
Folio 54 verso with text of Matthew 22:32-44

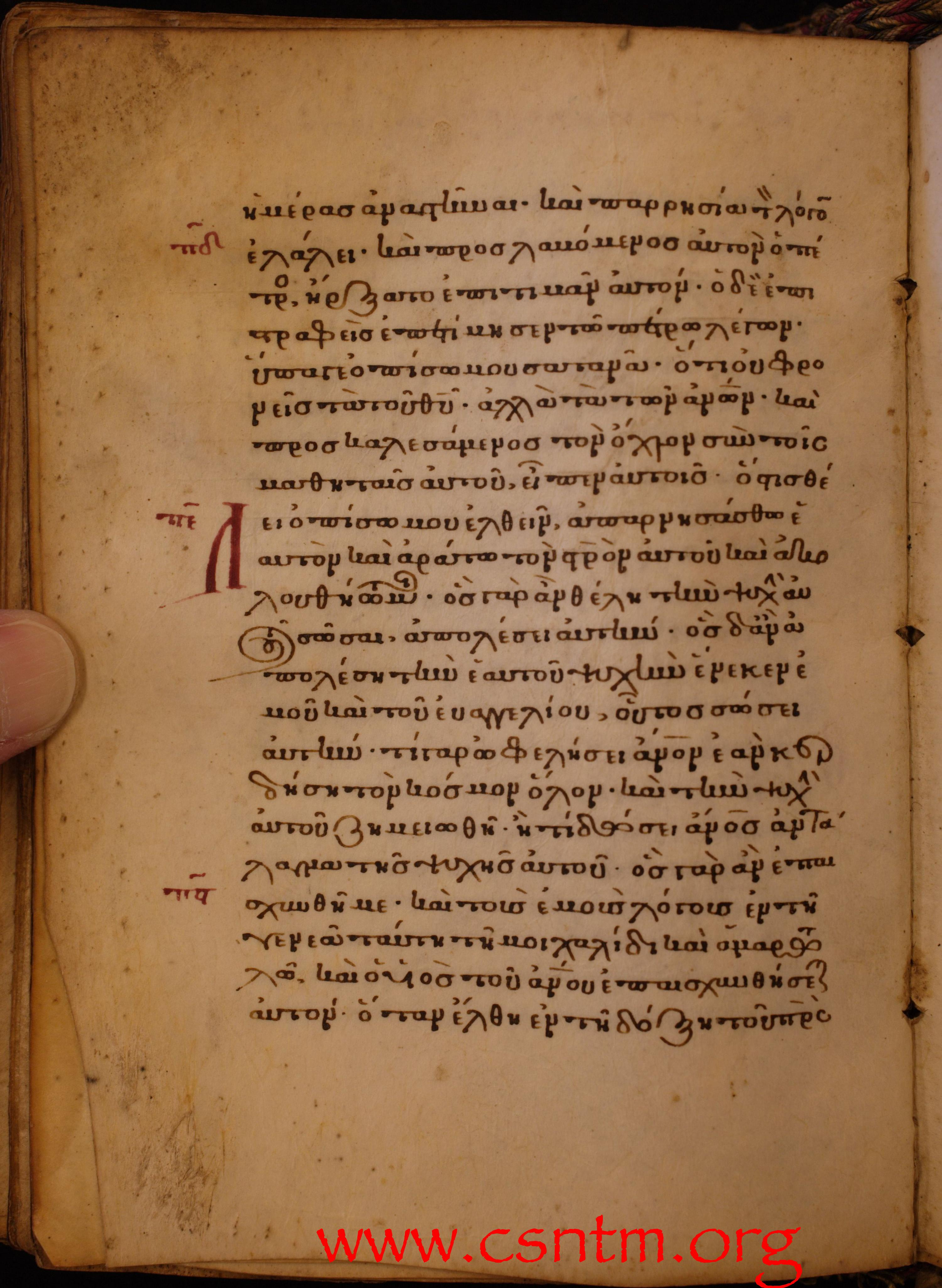
Folio 98 verso with text of Mark 8:31-38

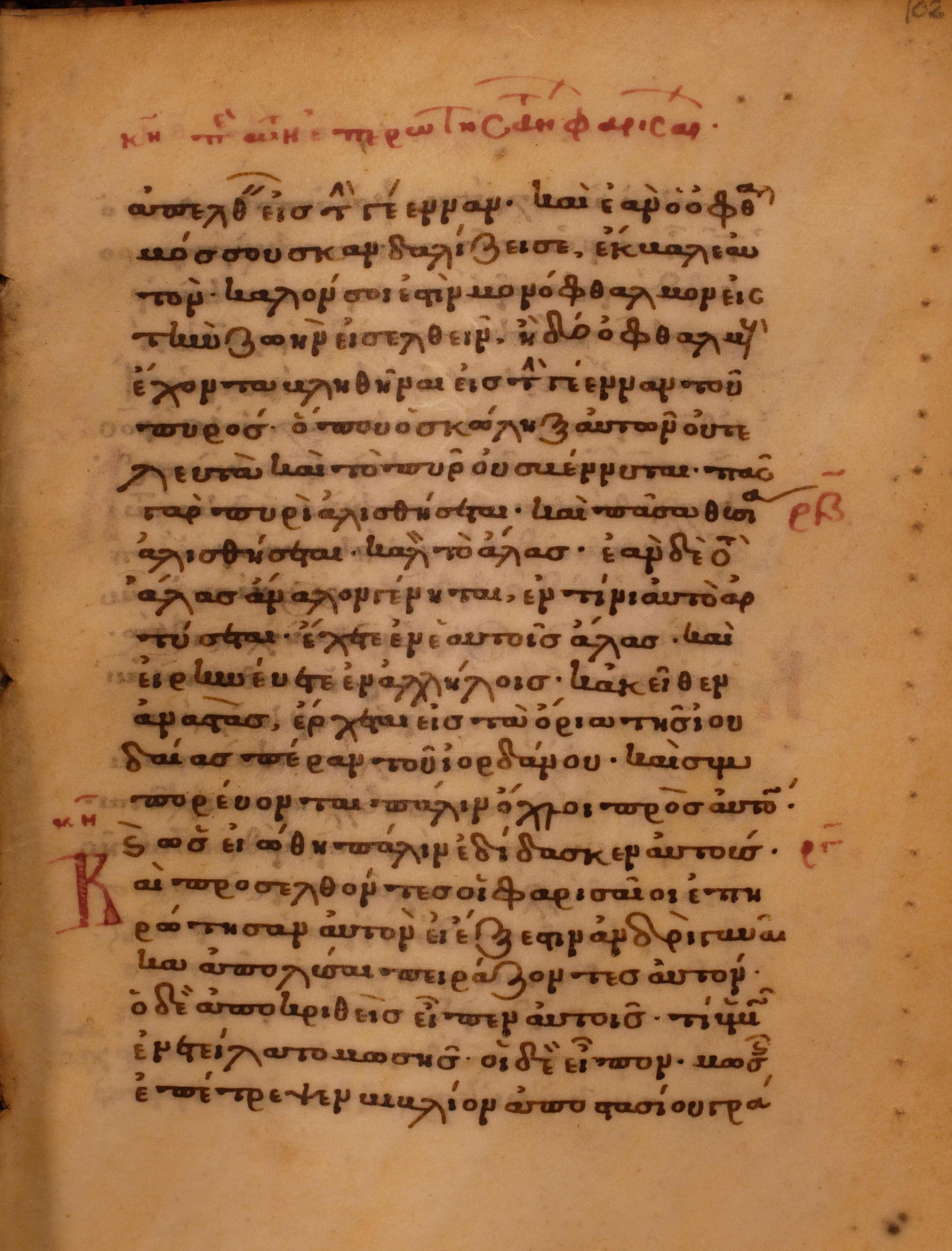
Folio 102 recto with text of Mark 9:42-10:4; verses 44 and 46 are omitted

== See also ==
- List of New Testament minuscules
- Biblical manuscript
- Textual criticism
