= Minuscule 427 =

- New Testament manuscript
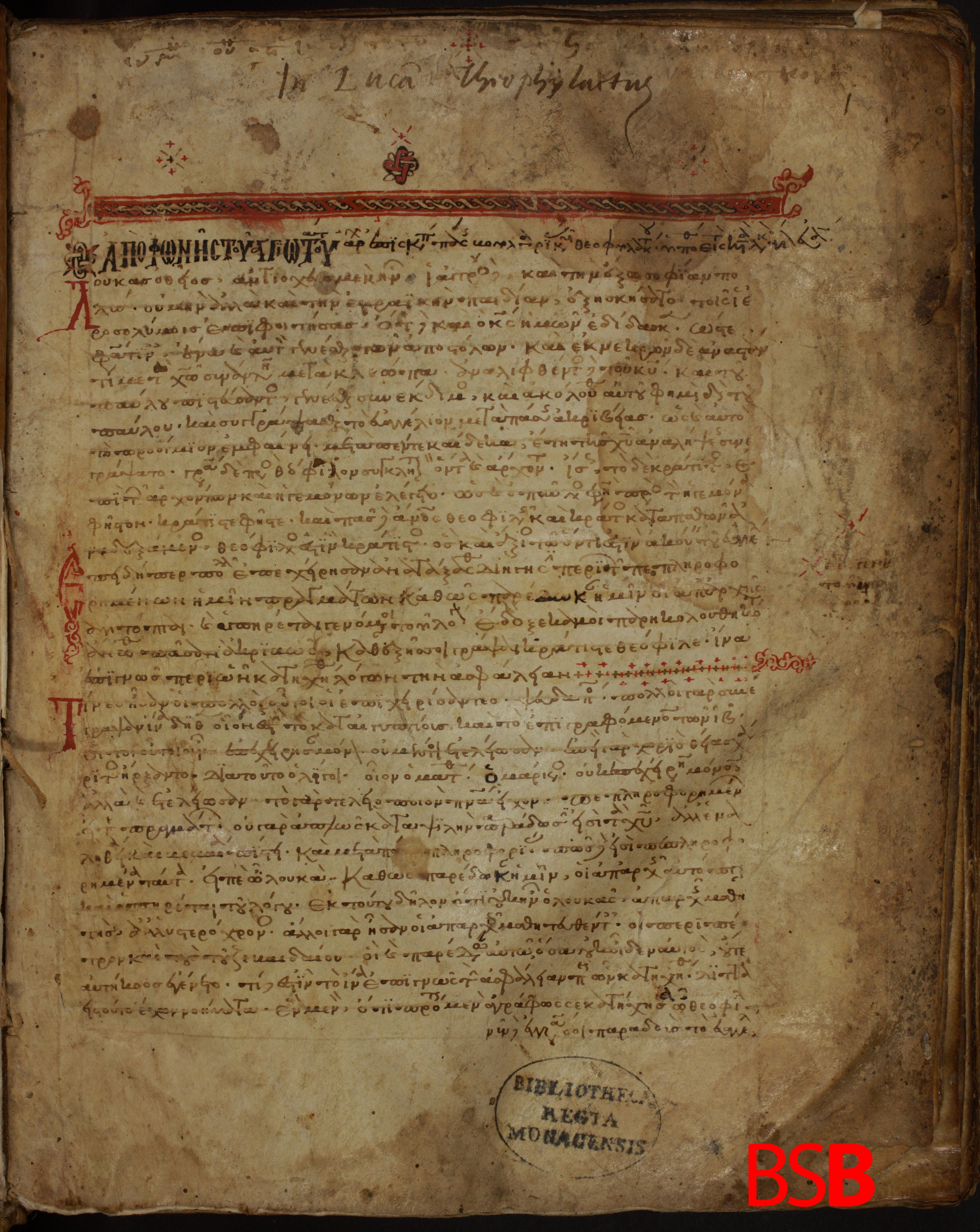
- Folio 1 recto
- Name: Monacensis 465
- Text: Luke, Mark
- Date: 13th century
- Script: Greek
- Now at: Bavarian State Library
- Size: 25.8 cm by 20.7 cm
- Type: mixed / Byzantine
- Category: none
- Note: marginalia

Minuscule 427 (in the Gregory-Aland numbering of New Testament manuscripts), Θ^{ε305} (in the von Soden numbering of New Testament manuscripts), is a Greek minuscule manuscript of the New Testament written on parchment. Using the study of comparative writings styles (palaeography), it has been assigned to the 13th century. It has marginal notes and contains a commentary from Theophylact of Ohrid.

== Description ==
The manuscript is a codex (precursor to the modern book containing the text of the Gospel of Luke and Gospel of Mark on 140 parchment leaves, sized (25.8 cm by 20.7 cm). It is written in one column per page, and 34 lines per page.

The text is divided according to the Ammonian Sections (in Mark 240 Sections, the last in 16:20), whose numbers are given at the margin. There are no references to the Eusebian Canons.

It contains lectionary markings at the margin (for liturgical use) and subscriptions at the end of each Gospel, with the numbers of phrases (known as ρηματα / rhemata) and numbers of lines (known as στιχοι / stichoi) in Luke but not Mark, and a commentary of Theophylact in both Luke and Mark.

== Text ==
The Greek text of the codex is considered to be predominantly mixed with the Byzantine text-type. Biblical scholar Kurt Aland did not place it in any Category of his New Testament manuscript classification system. According to the Claremont Profile Method it represents textual family K^{x} in Luke 10. In Luke 1 it has mixed text, in Luke 20 it has mixture of the Byzantine text-types.

== History ==
The manuscript was written by one Maurus. It was added to the list of New Testament manuscripts by Scholz. C. R. Gregory saw it in 1887.

The manuscript was formerly held in Augsburg, however it is currently housed at the Bavarian State Library (shelf number Gr. 465) in Munich, Germany.

== See also ==
- List of New Testament minuscules
- Biblical manuscript
- Textual criticism
- Minuscule 428
