= Minuscule 792 =

- New Testament manuscript
- Text: Gospels, Apocalypse
- Date: 13th century
- Script: Greek
- Now at: National Library of Greece
- Size: 9.5 cm by 7 cm
- Type: Byzantine text-type
- Category: none
- Note: –

Minuscule 792 (in the Gregory-Aland numbering), ε585 (von Soden), is a Greek minuscule manuscript of the New Testament written on paper. Palaeographically it has been assigned to the 13th century. The manuscript has complex contents.

== Description ==
The codex contains the text of the four Gospels and Book of Revelation, on 145 parchment leaves (size 9.5 cm by 7 cm). It contains also some passages of the Old Testament.

The text is written in one column per page, 32-40 lines per page.

The text is divided according to the κεφαλαια (chapters), whose numbers are given at the margin, with their τιτλοι (titles) at the top of the pages. There is also another division according to the smaller Ammonian Sections.

It contains tables of the κεφαλαια (tables of contents) before each Gospel, subscriptions at the end of each Gospel, and numbers of στιχοι.

== Text ==
The Greek text of the codex is a representative of the Byzantine text-type. Hermann von Soden classified it to the textual family K^{ak}, but with some hesitation. Aland did not place it in any Category.

According to the Claremont Profile Method it has mixed Byzantine text in Luke 1, Luke 10, and Luke 20. It creates textual pair with minuscule 2643.

It lacks the text of Matthew 16:2b–3.

== History ==
According to Gregory the manuscript was written in the 13th century. The manuscript is currently dated by the INTF to the 13th century. The manuscript was written in Calabria. The manuscript was once presented by Demetrius to Bernardus.

The manuscript was noticed in catalogue from 1876.

It was added to the list of New Testament manuscripts by Gregory (792). Gregory saw the manuscript in 1886. Text of Apocalypse was collated by Herman C. Hoskier.

The manuscript is now housed at the National Library of Greece (107) in Athens.

== See also ==
- List of New Testament minuscules
- Biblical manuscript
- Textual criticism
- Minuscule 791
