= Lectionary 332 =

Lectionary ℓ 332
- New Testament manuscript
- Text: Evangelistarium †
- Date: 14th-century
- Script: Greek
- Found: 1874
- Now at: British Library
- Size: 33.2 cm by 25 cm
- Type: Byzantine text-type

Lectionary 332 (Gregory-Aland), designated by siglum ℓ 332 (in the Gregory-Aland numbering) is a Greek manuscript of the New Testament, on parchment. Palaeographically it has been assigned to the 14th century. The manuscript has not survived in complete condition.

== Description ==
The original codex contained lessons from the Gospel of John, Matthew, Luke (Evangelistarium), with lacunae on 295 parchment leaves. The leaves are measured (33.2 cm by 25 cm).

The text is written in Greek minuscule letters, in two columns per page, 25 lines per page. It has illuminated head-pieces and initial letters.

The codex contains weekday Gospel lessons according to the Byzantine Church order.

== History ==
Scrivener dated the manuscript to the late 11th century. According to Gregory it was written in the 14th century. It is presently assigned by the INTF to the 14th century.

It was purchased for the British Museum in 1874.

The manuscript was added to the list of New Testament manuscripts by Scrivener (62^{e}) and Gregory (number 332^{e}). Gregory saw it in 1883.

Currently the codex is housed at the British Library (Add MS 29713) in London.

The fragment is not cited in critical editions of the Greek New Testament (UBS4, NA28).

== See also ==
- List of New Testament lectionaries
- Biblical manuscript
- Textual criticism
- Lectionary 331

== Bibliography ==
- Gregory, Caspar René (1900). Textkritik des Neuen Testaments. Vol. 1. Leipzig: J.C. Hinrichs’sche Buchhandlung. p. 416.
