= Minuscule 382 =

- New Testament manuscript
- Text: Gospels †
- Date: 11th century
- Script: Greek
- Now at: Vatican Library
- Size: 21.7 cm by 18.2 cm
- Type: Byzantine text-type / mixed
- Hand: carelessly written
- Note: marginalia

Minuscule 382 (in the Gregory-Aland numbering), ε 300 (Soden), is a Greek minuscule manuscript of the New Testament, on parchment. Palaeographically it has been assigned to the 11th century. The manuscript is lacunose. It contains marginalia.

== Description ==
The codex contains the text of the Gospel of Luke on 167 parchment leaves (21.7 cm by 18.2 cm) with numerous lacunae. The text is written in two columns per page, in 24 lines per page.

The text is divided according to the κεφαλαια (chapters), whose numbers are given at the margin, and their τιτλοι (titles of chapters) at the top of the pages. There is also a division according to the smaller Ammonian Sections, but without references to the Eusebian Canons.

It contains list of the κεφαλαια (table of contents) before the Gospel, lectionary markings at the margin for liturgical use, subscriptions at the end of the Gospel, and numbers of στιχοι. It was carelessly written.

The fragments of John and Luke are placed by the binder before Matthew and Mark.

== Text ==
Hermann von Soden included the text of the codex in the textual family K^{1}. Aland did not place it in any of his Categories. According to the Claremont Profile Method its text in Luke 1; 10; 20 is mixed.

== History ==
The manuscript was written in Calabria. The manuscript was added to the list of New Testament manuscripts by Scholz (1794–1852). C. R. Gregory saw it in 1886.

The manuscript is currently housed at the Vatican Library (Vat. gr. 2070) in Rome.

== See also ==
- List of New Testament minuscules
- Biblical manuscript
- Textual criticism
