= Minuscule 251 =

- New Testament manuscript
- Text: Gospels
- Date: 12th century
- Script: Greek
- Now at: Russian State Library
- Size: 21.7 cm by 16 cm
- Type: mixed / Byzantine
- Category: none

Minuscule 251 is a Greek minuscule manuscript of the New Testament Gospels, written on parchment. It is designated by the siglum 251 in the Gregory-Aland numbering of New Testament manuscripts, and ε 192 in the von Soden numbering of New Testament manuscripts. Using the study of comparative writing styles (palaeography), it has been dated to the 12th century. The manuscript has complex contents.

== Description ==
The manuscript is a codex (precursor to the modern book format), containing the complete text of the four Gospels on 273 parchment leaves (sized 21.7 cm by 16 cm). The text is written in one column per page and 23 lines per page.

The text is divided according to the Ammonian sections, whose numbers are given in the margin, but without references to the Eusebian Canons.

It contains the Epistle to Carpian, the Eusebian Canon tables, with the tables of contents (known as κεφαλαια) placed before each Gospel. It has pictures. The text has some affinities with Minuscule 59.

== Text ==
The Greek text of the codex is considered to be a representative of the Byzantine text-type, but with several non-Byzantine elements. Textual critic Hermann von Soden lists it under the textual sub-group I^{I}. Biblical scholar Kurt Aland did not assign it to any Category of his New Testament manuscript classification system.

According to the Claremont Profile Method (a specific analysis of textual data), it belongs to the textual cluster 1229. Its Greek text has several affinities to the readings seen in Codex Tischendorfianus IV (Γ).

== History ==
The earliest history of the manuscript is unknown. It once belonged to Auxentius. Theophilus Zagoloras sent it to one of the monasteries at Mount Athos in A.D. 1400. It was brought to Moscow in 1655, by the monk Arsenius, on the suggestion of the Patriarch Nikon, during the reign of Alexei Mikhailovich Romanov (1645-1676).

The manuscript was collated by scholar Christian F. Matthaei. It was examined by Matthaei and Franz Delitzsch. The manuscript is currently dated by the INTF to the 12th century. It is presently housed at the Russian State Library (shelf number Φ 181. 9 (Gr. 9)) in Moscow.

== See also ==
- Minuscule 252
- Minuscule 250
- List of New Testament minuscules
- Biblical manuscript
- Textual criticism
