= Lectionary 333 =

Lectionary ℓ 333
- New Testament manuscript
- Text: Evangelistarium †
- Date: 13th-century
- Script: Greek
- Found: 1880
- Now at: British Library
- Size: 33.1 cm by 25 cm
- Type: Byzantine text-type
- Note: Armenian note

Lectionary 333 (Gregory-Aland), designated by siglum ℓ 333 (in the Gregory-Aland numbering), is a Greek manuscript of the New Testament, on parchment. Palaeographically it has been assigned to the 13th century. The manuscript has not survived in complete condition.

== Description ==
The original codex contained lessons from the Gospel of John, Matthew, Luke (Evangelistarium), with lacunae on 272 parchment leaves. The leaves are measured (33.1 cm by 25 cm). 84 leaves of the codex have lost.

The text is written in Greek minuscule letters, in two columns per page, 23 lines per page. It contains music notes and an Armenian note dated to 1460. According to Scrivener a note has no special interest.

The codex contains weekday Gospel lessons according to the Byzantine Church order.

== History ==
Scrivener and Gregory dated the manuscript to the 13th century. It has been assigned by the Institute for New Testament Textual Research to the 13th century.

It was bought in Constantinople in 1880 and brought to London. It was examined by W. F. Rose, who collated its text. W. F. Rose found it much to resemble Lectionary 184.

The manuscript was added to the list of New Testament manuscripts by Scrivener (281^{e}) and Gregory (number 333^{e}). Gregory saw it in 1883.

The codex is housed at the British Library (Add MS 31208) in London.

The fragment is not cited in critical editions of the Greek New Testament (UBS4, NA28).

== See also ==
- List of New Testament lectionaries
- Biblical manuscript
- Textual criticism
- Lectionary 332

== Bibliography ==
- Gregory, Caspar René (1900). Textkritik des Neuen Testaments. Vol. 1. Leipzig: J.C. Hinrichs’sche Buchhandlung. p. 416.
