= Codex Sangallensis 18 =

Uncial 0130
- New Testament manuscript
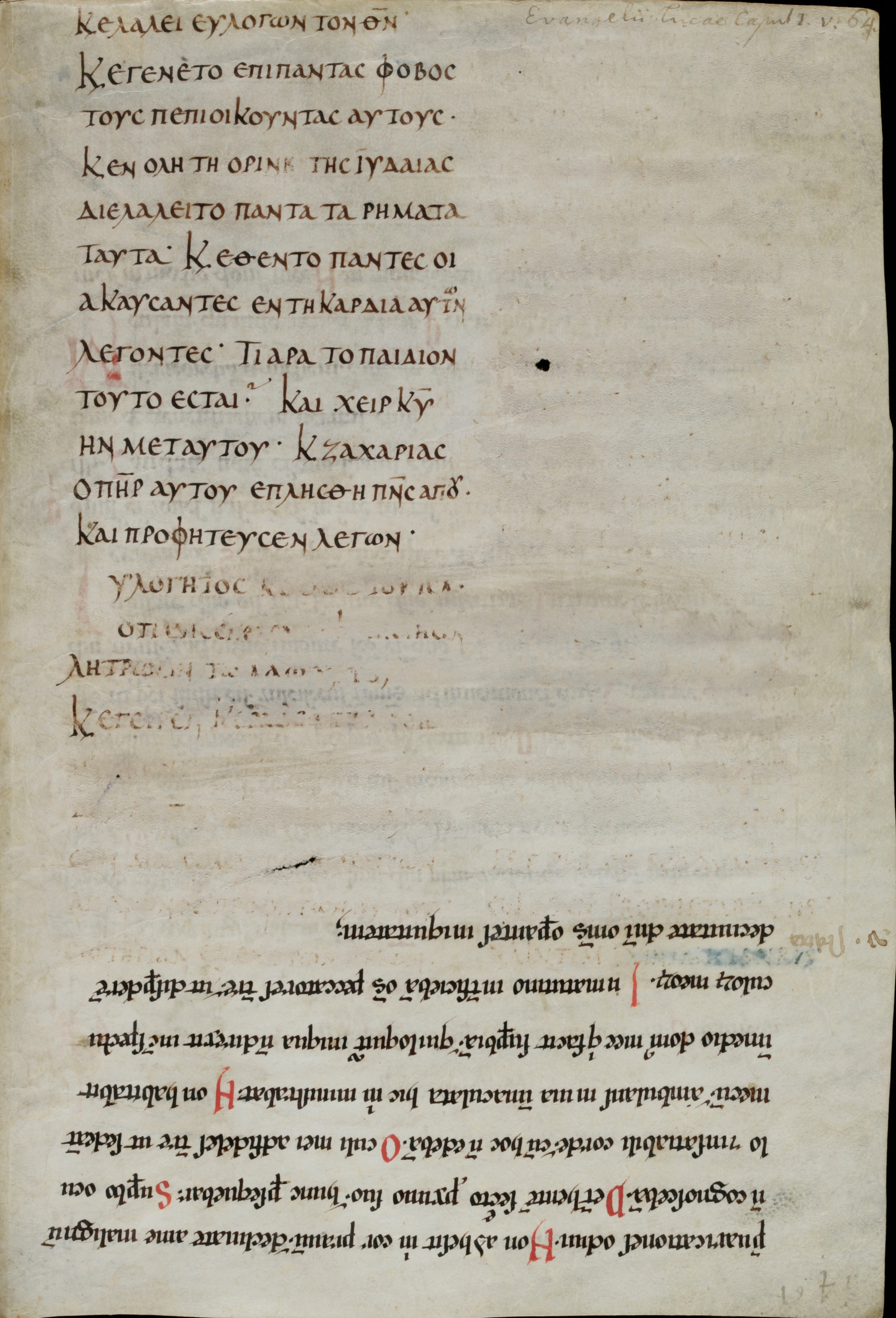
- Name: Sangallensis 18
- Text: Mark 1-2 †; Luke 1-2 †
- Date: 9th-century
- Script: Greek
- Now at: Abbey library of Saint Gall
- Size: 29.5 cm by 21.3 cm
- Type: mixed
- Category: III, influenced by V
- Note: palimpsest

Uncial 0130 (in the Gregory-Aland numbering), ε 80 (Soden), is a Greek uncial manuscript of the New Testament, dated palaeographically to the 9th-century. Formerly it was labelled by W^{c}.

== Description ==
The codex contains a small part of the Mark 1:31-2:16; Luke 1:20-31.64-79; 2:24-48, on 7 parchment leaves (29.5 cm by 21.3 cm). It is written in two columns per page, 22 lines per page, in large uncial letters. The writing is similar to Codex Sangallensis 48 but bigger. It has diacritic marks and accents.

It is a palimpsest, the upper text has Latin Vulgate. The leaves were washed to make a palimpsest, and the writing erased in parts by a knife.

The Greek text of this codex is a representative of the mixed text-type, with a strong element of the Byzantine text-type. Hermann von Soden classified it to the textual family I'. Aland placed it in Category III.

According to the Claremont Profile Method it has mixed text in Luke 1. In Luke 10 and Luke 20 the manuscript is defective.

== History ==
It is dated by the INTF to the 9th-century.

The manuscript was examined by Tischendorf.

Four leaves of the codex are housed at the Abbey library of Saint Gall (18, fol. 143-146; 45, fol. 1-2) in St. Gallen, and three leaves in Zürich (Zentralbibliothek, C 57, fol. 5, 74, 93, 135).

== See also ==
- List of New Testament uncials
- Textual criticism
