= Minuscule 4 =

Greek minuscule manuscript of the New Testament

- New Testament manuscript
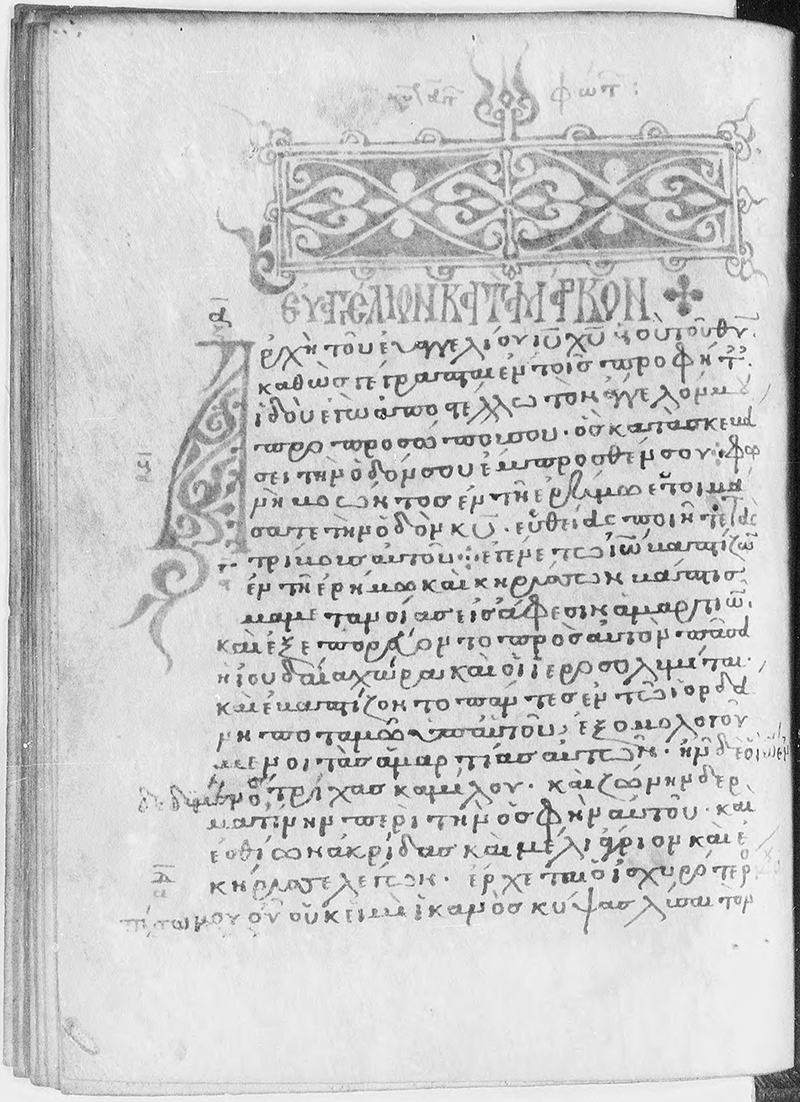
- Text: Gospels
- Date: 13th century
- Script: Greek
- Now at: National Library of France
- Size: 18.5 cm by 14.3 cm
- Type: mixed
- Category: none
- Note: close to 273 marginalia

Minuscule 4 is a Greek minuscule manuscript of the New Testament, written on vellum. It is designated by the siglum 4 in the Gregory-Aland numbering of New Testament manuscripts, and ε 371 in the von Soden numbering of New Testament manuscripts. Using the study of comparative writing styles (palaeography), it has been dated to the 13th century. It was formerly named Codex Regius 84. It has a full collection of marginal marks (known as marginalia). It was adapted for liturgical use.

== Description ==
The manuscript is a codex (precursor to the modern book format), containing an almost complete text of the four Gospels with four gaps (Matthew 2:9-20; Mark 15:42-16:14; John 1:1-13.49-3:11), consisting of 212 parchment leaves (sized 18.5 cm by 14.3 cm). The text is written in one column per page, 26-28 lines per page.

The text is divided according to the chapters (known as κεφαλαια / kephalaia), whose numbers are given in the margin, with the titles of chapters (τιτλοι / titloi) at the top of the pages. There is also another division according to the smaller Ammonian Sections (an early division of the Gospels into sections). The codex has 27 sections in Mark. There are also references to the Eusebian Canons (another early division of the Gospels into sections, and where they overlap).

It contains the Letter to Carpian, tables of contents (also known as κεφαλαια / kephalaia) are placed before each Gospel, lectionary markings in the margin (for liturgical use), incipits, synaxaria, Menologion, subscriptions at the end of each Gospel, numbers of στιχοι, and extracts from some Church Fathers. The Pericope Adulterae (John 7:53–8:11) is marked with an obelus.

== Text ==
The Greek text of this codex is considered to be a mixture of text-types. According to biblical scholar Constantin von Tischendorf, its text is mixed but with a strong Byzantine element.

Biblical scholar Kurt Aland did not place it in any Category within his categories of New Testament manuscripts. Textually it is close to the codex 273.

According to the Claremont Profile Method (a specific analysis method of textual data), it represents K^{x} in Luke 10 and Luke 20. In Luke 1 it has mixed Byzantine text.

In Matthew 21:31 it has the textual variant ὁ δεύτερος (the second) instead of ὁ πρῶτος (the first), ὁ ὕστερος (the last), or ὁ ἔσχατος (the last). This reading is supported by Minuscule 273 and lectionary ℓ 547.

== History ==
The manuscript was used by biblical scholar Desiderius Erasmus in his edition of Novum Testamentum, and by Robert Estienne in his Editio Regia (1550), who designated it as γ'. Biblical scholar John Mill noticed its affinity to the Latin versions and the Complutensian Polyglot.

It was examined by Scholz and Paulin Martin. Biblical scholar Caspar René Gregory saw the manuscript in 1885.

The codex is located now at the Bibliothèque nationale de France (Gr. 84) in Paris.

== See also ==
- List of New Testament minuscules
- Textus Receptus
- Textual criticism
