= Minuscule 1093 =

- New Testament manuscript
- Text: Gospels
- Date: 1302
- Script: Greek
- Now at: Agiou Panteleimonos monastery
- Size: 24.5 cm by 17.5 cm
- Type: Caesarean/mixed
- Category: none
- Note: marginalia

Minuscule 1093 (in the Gregory-Aland numbering), ε1443 (von Soden), is a 14th-century Greek minuscule manuscript of the New Testament on parchment. The manuscript has survived in complete condition.

== Description ==
The codex contains the text of the four Gospels with a commentary on 190 parchment leaves (size 24.5 cm by 17.5 cm).

The text is written in one column per page, 25 lines per page.

The text is divided according to chapters (κεφαλαια), whose numbers are given at the margin, and their titles (τιτλοι) at the top of the pages. The later hand added also another division according to the smaller Ammonian Sections, but without references to the Eusebian Canons.

It contains pictures of the four Evangelists before each Gospel and subscriptions at the end of each Gospel.

== Text ==
The Greek text of the codex has a mixture of the text types. Hermann von Soden included it to the textual family I (Caesarean text-type). Kurt Aland did not place the Greek text of the codex in any Category.

According to the Claremont Profile Method it has a mixture of text-types in Luke 1, Luke 10, and Luke 20.

It lacks the text of Matthew 16:2b–3 (Signs of the times).

== History ==
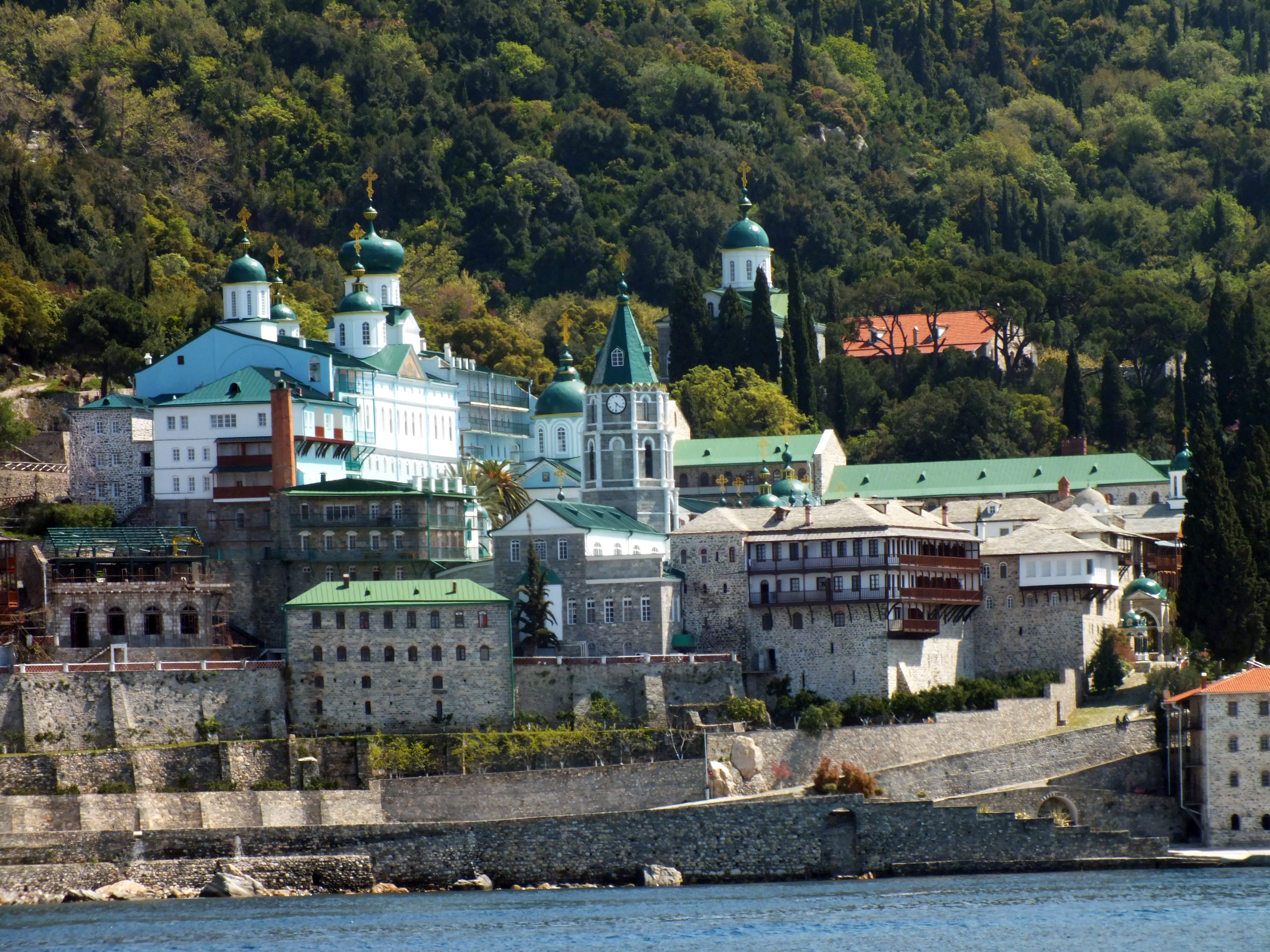
Agiou Panteleimonos monastery

According to the colophon the manuscript was written in 1302 by a scribe called Michael Morraites for the priest Clemens.

The manuscript was added to the list of New Testament manuscripts by Gregory (1093^{e}). C. R. Gregory saw it in 1886. In 1908 Gregory gave the siglum 1093 to it.

The manuscript is housed at the Agiou Panteleimonos monastery (28), at Mount Athos.

== See also ==
- List of New Testament minuscules
- Biblical manuscript
- Textual criticism
