= Minuscule 273 =

- New Testament manuscript
- Text: Gospels
- Date: 13th century
- Script: Greek
- Now at: Bibliothèque nationale de France
- Size: 22 cm by 16 cm
- Type: Byzantine
- Category: none
- Note: close to 4

Minuscule 273 (in the Gregory-Aland numbering), ε 370 (Soden), is a Greek minuscule manuscript of the New Testament, on vellum, but partly on cotton paper. Palaeographically it has been assigned to the 13th century. The manuscript has complex contents. It has marginalia.

== Description ==
The codex contains the text of the four Gospels on 201 parchment leaves (22 cm by 16 cm). The text is written in one column per page, in 29-31 lines per page.

The text is divided according to the κεφαλαια (chapters), whose numbers are given at the margin of the text, and their τιτλοι (titles of chapters) at the top of the pages. There is also another division according to the smaller Ammonian Sections (in Mark 234 sections, the last in 16:9), with references to the Eusebian Canons (written below Ammonian Section numbers).

It contains the Epistula ad Carpianum, Eusebian tables, tables of the κεφαλαια (tables of contents) before each Gospel (with a Harmony) before each Gospel, Synaxarion, Menologion (later hand), and subscriptions at the end of each Gospel with numbers of Verses. It has also some scholia, extracts from Severianus's commentary, list of the Gospel's parables.

== Text ==
The Greek text of the codex is a representative of the Byzantine text-type with a mixture of other text-types. According to Gregory it is a sister of the codex 4. Hermann von Soden included it to the textual family K^{x}. Aland did not place it in any Category. According to the Claremont Profile Method it represents K^{x} in Luke 10. In Luke 1 and Luke 20 it has a mixture of the Byzantine text-families.

In Matthew 21:31 it has textual variant ὁ δεύτερος (the second) against ὁ πρῶτος (the first), ὁ ὕστερος (the last), or ὁ ἔσχατος (the last). This reading is supported by the codex 4.

== History ==
The manuscript was added to the list of New Testament manuscripts by Scholz (1794-1852). It was examined and described by Paulin Martin. C. R. Gregory saw the manuscript in 1885.

The manuscript is currently housed at the Bibliothèque nationale de France (Gr. 79) at Paris.

== See also ==
- List of New Testament minuscules
- Biblical manuscript
- Textual criticism
