= Uncial 0187 =

- New Testament manuscript
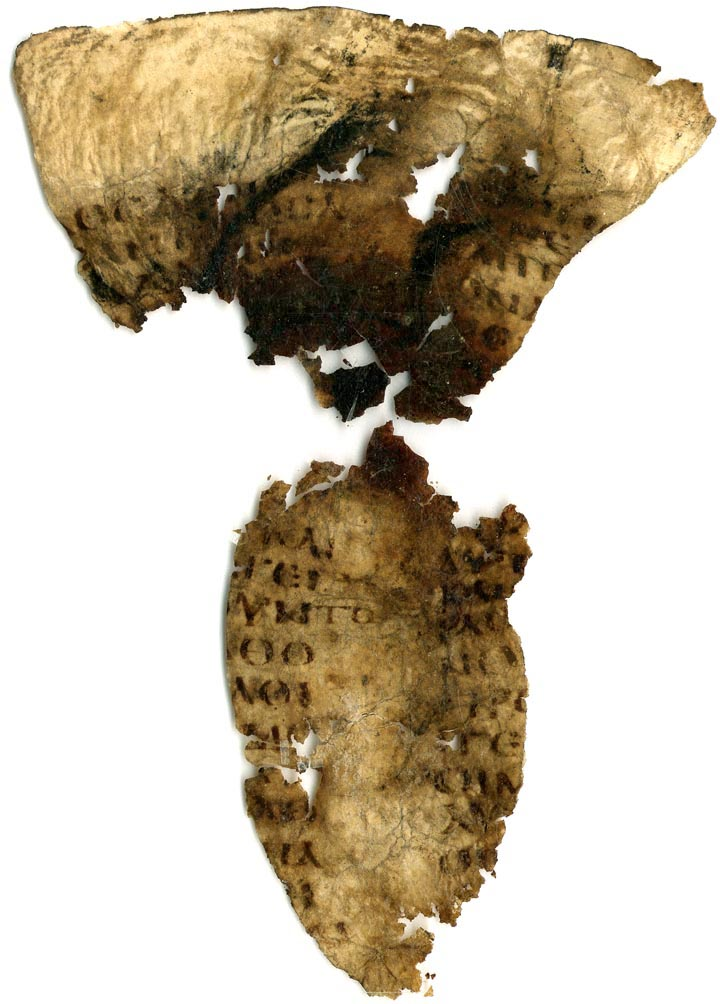
- Text: Mark 6:30-41
- Date: 6th-century
- Script: Greek
- Now at: University of Heidelberg
- Size: 24 x 18 cm
- Type: mixed
- Category: III

Uncial 0187 (in the Gregory-Aland numbering), ε 024 (Soden), is a Greek uncial manuscript of the New Testament, dated paleographically to the 6th century.

== Description ==
The codex contains a small parts of the Gospel of Mark 6:30-41, on one parchment leaf (24 cm by 18 cm). It is written in two columns per page, 26 lines per page, in uncial letters. The fragment contains about 339 letters from 1044 on both sides of the leaf.

The Greek text of this codex is mixed. Aland placed it in Category III.

Currently it is dated by the INTF to the 6th-century.

It belonged to the same manuscript as 0149.

It was examined by Guglielmo Cavallo.

The codex is currently housed at the University of Heidelberg (Pap. 1354) in Heidelberg.

== See also ==
- List of New Testament uncials
- Textual criticism
