= Uncial 083 =

- New Testament manuscript
- Text: Mark 13; 14; 15-16; John 1; 2-4; 14
- Date: 6th/7th century
- Script: Greek
- Now at: Russian National Library
- Size: 28 by 26 cm
- Type: Alexandrian text-type
- Category: II

Uncial 083 (in the Gregory-Aland numbering), ε 31 (Soden), is a Greek uncial manuscript of the New Testament, dated paleographically to the 6th/7th century. The codex now is located at the Russian National Library (Gr. 10) in Saint Petersburg.

== Description ==
The manuscript contains a small part of the Gospel of John 1:25-41; 2:9-4:14,34-49, on 6 parchment leaves (28 by 26 cm). The text is written in two columns per page, 25 lines per page, in large uncial letters. It has no accents, breathings, or punctuation. The text is divided according to the Ammonian Sections, with a references to the Eusebian Canons. The Old Testament quotations are marker on the margin by inverted comma (>>).

Currently it is dated by the INTF to the 6th or 7th century.

It came from the same codex as manuscript Uncial 0112. It contains Gospel of Mark 14:29-45; 15:27-16:8, and the shorter Markan ending on 4 leaves. It was found by J. Rendel Harris. Harris published its text. It is now located at the Saint Catherine's Monastery, Sinai Harris (12, 4 ff.).

From the same codex as manuscript Uncial 0235. It contains Gospel of Mark 13:12-14.16-19.21-24.26-28 on 1 leaf (fragments). The fragment is located now in the Russian National Library (O. 149) in Saint Petersburg.

== Text ==
The Greek text of this codex is a representative of the Alexandrian text-type, with some alien readings. Kurt Aland placed it to Category II.

It contains Mark 15:28.

In John 1:28 it has textual variant Βηθαβαρα together with the manuscripts C^{2} K, Ψ, 0113, f^{1}, f^{13} and Byz. Other manuscripts have βηθανια.

In John 3:12 it has textual variant πιστευετε (you believe) – instead of πιστευσετε (you will believe) – together with the manuscripts Papyrus 75 and Uncial 050.

== See also ==
- List of New Testament uncials
- Textual criticism
