= Minuscule 652 =

- New Testament manuscript
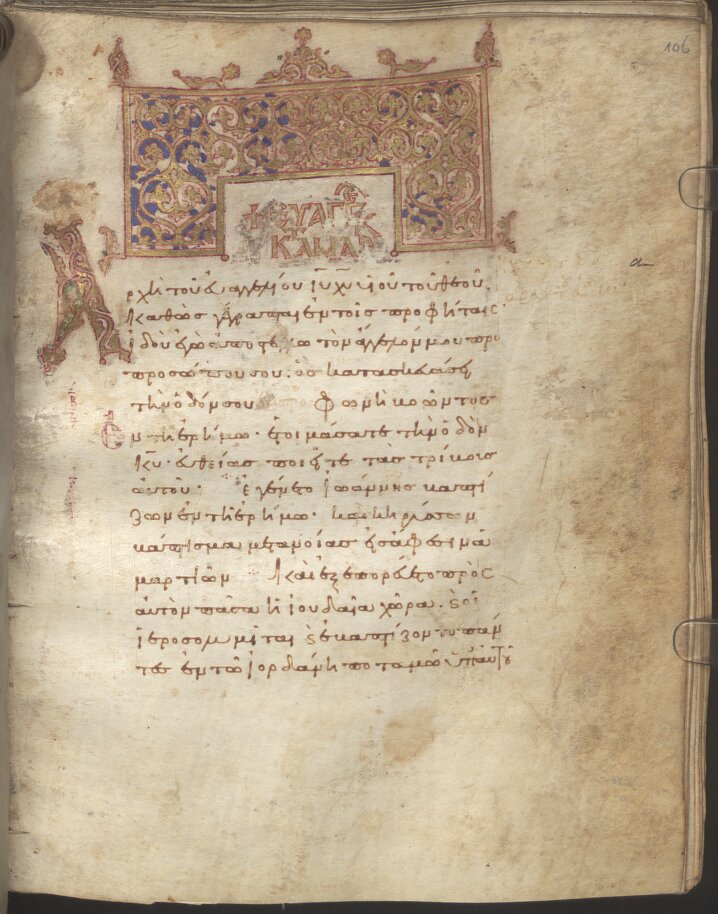
- Text: Gospels
- Date: 10th century
- Script: Greek
- Now at: Bavarian State Library
- Size: 22.4 cm by 16.7 cm
- Type: Byzantine text-type
- Category: none

Minuscule 652 is a Greek minuscule manuscript of the New Testament, written on parchment. It is designated by 652 in the Gregory-Aland numbering of New Testament manuscripts, and ε1095 in the von Soden numbering of New Testament manuscripts. Using the study of comparative writing styles (palaeography), it has been assigned to the 10th century. The manuscript has complex contents, with "an interesting textual character". Biblical scholar Frederick H. A. Scrivener labelled it as 875.

== Description ==
The manuscript is a codex (the precursor to the modern book format), containing the complete text of the four Gospels written on 305 parchment leaves (sized 22.4 cm by 16.7 cm). It is written in one column per page, 20 lines per page. The colour portraits of the four evangelists are inlaid with gold, and the headpieces containing the Gospel titles have been described as "elaborately decorated" containing "an intricately decorated gold initial". Chapter titles are written in red ink.

It contains the Epistle to Carpian (a letter by the early church Father Eusebius of Caesarea outlining his Gospel content system), the Eusebian tables, the chapter tables (known as κεφάλαια / kephalaia), numerals of the κεφάλαια in the margin, the titles (known as τίτλοι / titloi), the Ammonian Sections and the Eusebian Canons (both early systems of dividing the Gospels into sections), lectionary markings (incipits), the Synaxarion (list of Saint's days), a Menologion (list of weekly readings from the Gospels), subscriptions, and Icons of the Evangelists before each of their respective Gospels.

== Text ==
The Greek text of the codex is considered to be a representative of the Byzantine text-type. The text-types are groups of different New Testament manuscripts which share specific or generally related readings, which then differ from each other group, and thus the conflicting readings can separate out the groups. These are then used to determine the original text as published; there are three main groups with names: Alexandrian, Western, and Byzantine. Its relationship with other manuscripts is not commented on by textual critic Kurt Aland, who did not place it in any Category of his New Testament manuscripts classification system. According to the Claremont Profile Method (a specific analysis of textual data), it represents textual family Π^{a} in Luke 1, and K^{x} in Luke 10 and Luke 20.

Biblical scholar Silva Lake discovered it represents the text of Family 1 in Mark 4:20-6:24, and in the rest of Mark it coincides with the text of Family Π, hence the manuscript has a sort of "block mixture" between the two groups.

A later hand has added the following to John 8:8 in the margin:

ενος εκαστου αυτων τας αμαρτιας
(sins of every one of them).

This textual variant is also found in Codex Nanianus (U), and the minuscules Minuscule 73, 95, 331, 364, 700, 782, 1592, and some Armenian manuscripts. Minuscule 264 includes this textual variant in John 8:6.

== History ==
The earliest history of the manuscript is unknown. It once belonged to Otto of Greece (King of Greece 1832-1862) and was brought to Germany in 1879.

Biblical scholar Caspar René Gregory saw the manuscript in 1887, and dated it to the 10th or 11th century. The manuscript is now dated by the Institute for New Testament Textual Research (INTF) to the 10th century. The manuscript is currently housed at the Bavarian State Library (shelf number Gr. 594), in Munich.

== See also ==
- Minuscule 653
- Minuscule 651
- Family Π
- List of New Testament minuscules
- Biblical manuscript
- Textual criticism
