= Uspenski Gospels =

Minuscule 461
- New Testament manuscript
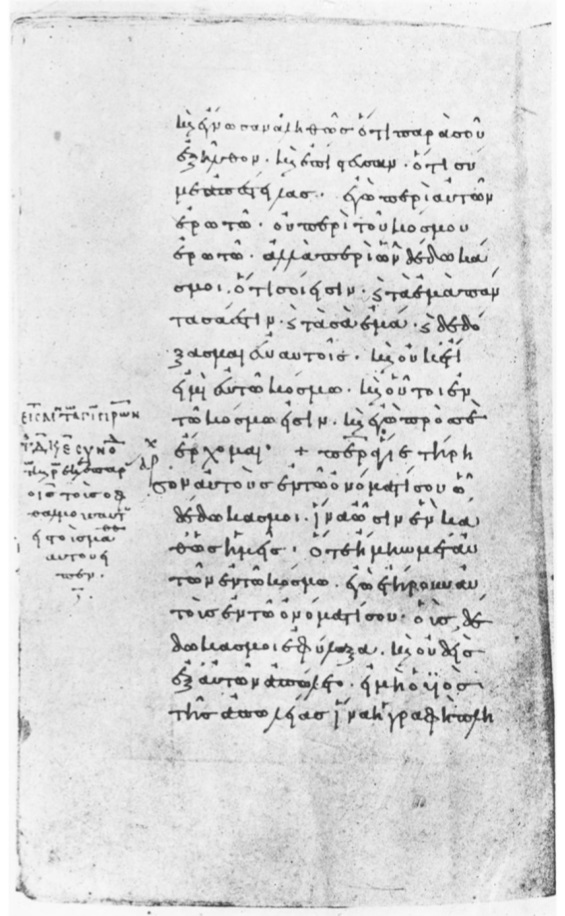
- Page with text of John 17:2-12
- Name: Uspenski Gospels
- Text: Gospels
- Date: 835
- Script: Greek
- Found: Uspensky 1844
- Now at: National Library of Russia
- Size: 16.7 x 10.7 cm
- Type: Byzantine text-type
- Category: V
- Hand: regular and well formed

The Uspenski Gospels, Minuscule 461 (in the Gregory-Aland numbering), ε 92 (Soden), are a New Testament minuscule manuscript written in Greek, dated to 835 AD, and now in St Petersburg in Russia. They are the oldest known dated manuscript of the New Testament; it was not customary for Greek scribes to date their work at the time.

== Description ==
The codex contains complete text of the four Gospels, on 344 parchment leaves, the leaves measure 16.7 cm by 10.7 cm. The text is written in one column per page, 19 lines per page, in minuscule letters. The margins are very wide, the column of writing occupies an area of 11,3 cm by 6 cm. The words are written continuously, usually without any separation (with some exceptions).

The letters are small and upright. The letters are regular and well-formed. They do not look like experimental ones in character. This type of handwriting was used for some time before this manuscript, according to Bruce M. Metzger, even more than half a century.

The headings of the Gospels and liturgical notes at the margin are written in uncial letters. The nomina sacra are written in an abbreviated way. It also has other abbreviations. It has ligatures, occasionally it has separate words.

The text is divided according to the κεφαλαια (chapters), whose numbers are given at the margin of the text. The chapters have their τιτλοι (titles of chapters) at the top of the pages. There is no another division according to the Ammonian Sections, and no references to the Eusebian Canons. It contains lectionary markings (liturgical notes) at the margin and the manuscript was prepared to the liturgical reading. At the margin of the beginning of the Gospel of Mark a note specifies that the passage Mark 1:1-8 is appointed to be read on the Sunday before the Feast of Lights (τη κυριακη προ των Φωτων εαν φθασουν δυο κυριακας μεσον λεγεται τουτο εις την Β̅ κυριακην).

== Text ==
The codex is a representative of the Byzantine text-type. Aland placed it in Category V. It belongs to the textual family K^{1}, the oldest form of the Byzantine text.

The texts of Matthew 16:2b–3 (the signs of the times), Luke 22:43-44 (Christ's agony at Gethsemane), and John 5:3.4, are marked with an asterisk (※) as doubtful. The text of Mark 16:8-20 is not numbered by κεφαλαια (chapters) at the margin and there is not the τιτλοι (titles) at the top.

The Pericope de adultera was omitted by the original scribe. It has been added in the margin by a much later hand.

In Luke 1:26 Nazareth is spelled in form Ναζαρετ (against Ναζαρεθ).

In John 1:45 it reads Ιησουν τον υιον Ιωσηφ (Jesus, son of Joseph) along with manuscripts: Alexandrinus, Cyprius, Campianus, Macedoniensis, Sangallensis, Petropolitanus, Uncial 047, 7, 8, 196, 817, 1514, 1519; majority of the manuscripts read Ιησουν τον υιον του Ιωσηφ;

In John 3:2 it reads προς αυτον (to him), majority of manuscripts have προς τον Ιησουν (to Jesus); the reading of the codex is supported by Sinaiticus, Alexandrinus, Vaticanus, Cyprius, Regius, Vaticanus 354, Nanianus, Macedoniensis, Sangallensis, Koridethi, Tischendorfianus III, Petropolitanus, Atous Lavrensis, Athous Dionysiou, Uncial 047, Uncial 0211, Minuscule 7, 9, 565.

In John 4:1 it reads ο κυριος (the Lord) along with codices: Alexandrinus, Basilensis, Boreelianus, Seidelianus I, Cyprius, Vaticanus 354, Nanianus, Macedoniensis, Tischendorfianus IV, Koridethi, Petropolitanus, 044, 045, 0141, 0211, 2, 7, 8, 9, 27, 194, 196, 475; majority of manuscripts reads ο Ιησους (Jesus);

In John 8:6, it does not have the textual variant μη προσποιουμενος. This omission is supported by the manuscripts: Codex Campianus, Vaticanus 354, Nanianus, Tischendorfianus IV, Athous Dionysiou, 047, 7, 8, 9, 196, 461^{c2}, 1203, 1216, 1243, 1514, ℓ 663. The omission is included by the manuscripts: 07, 011, 017, 028, 041, minuscule 2, and majority of the Byzantine manuscripts.

== History ==
It has a colophon on the folio 344 verso, written by the same hand and in the same ink as the main text of the manuscript: ετελειωθη Θ̅υ̅ χαριτι η ιερα αυτη και θεοχαρακτος βιβλος μηνι μαιω ζ̅ ινδικτιωνος ι̅γ̅ ετους κοσμου σ̅τ̅μ̅γ̅. δυσωπω δε παντας τους εντυγχανοντας μνιαν μου ποιεισθαι του γραψαντος Νικολαου αμαρ(ωλου) μοναχ(ου) οπως ευροιμι ελεος εν ημερα κρισεως, γενοιτο κ̅ε̅ αμην.

Probably the codex was written by a monk named Nicolaus. It is the oldest dated minuscule Greek manuscript known today. Before discovering of this codex, the earliest dated cursive was Minuscule 14 (AD 964), and it was commonly believed that minuscule writing was not used in the 9th century. The manuscript was probably written in Constantinople, but later it belonged to the monastery of Mar Saba (9) in Palestine. The manuscript was seen and described by Johann Martin Augustin Scholz when he visited Mar Saba.

In 1844, Porphyrius Uspensky took it and brought it to Russia. It was examined and described by Victor Gardthausen in 1877, and Archimandrit Amphilochius in 1879 (translated by Oscar von Gebhardt in 1881).

The manuscript is cited in the Nestle-Aland Novum Testamentum Graece, because of its date.

The codex is held in Saint Petersburg (National Library of Russia, Gr. 219. 213. 101).

== See also ==
- List of New Testament minuscules
- Minuscule 462

== Sources ==
- Amphilochy, Archimandrit, Paläographische Beschreibung datirter griechischer Handschriften des IX und X Jahrhunderts, mit 26 zweifarbigen Tafeln Schriftproben, trans. Oscar von Gebhardt, Theologische Literaturzeitung. Leipzig 1881, pp. 128–131
- G. Cereteli, Wo ist das Tetraevangelium von Porphyrius Uspenskij aus dem Jahr 835 erstanden?, Byz Z IX (1900), pp. 649–653.
- A. Diller, A Companion to the Uspenski Gospels, Byz Z XLIX (1956), pp. 332–335.
- Bruce M. Metzger, Manuscripts of the Greek Bible: An Introduction To Greek Palaeography, 1981, Oxford University Press, p. 102, No. 26.
