= Minuscule 413 =

- New Testament manuscript
- Text: Gospels
- Date: 1302
- Script: Greek
- Now at: Biblioteca Marciana
- Size: 22.3 cm by 17 cm
- Type: Byzantine text-type
- Category: V
- Hand: elegantly written
- Note: marginalia

Minuscule 413 (in the Gregory-Aland numbering), ε 420 (in the Soden numbering), is a Greek minuscule manuscript of the New Testament, on parchment. It is dated by a colophon to the year 1302. It has marginalia.

== Description ==
The codex contains a complete text of the four Gospels on 266 parchment leaves (22.3 cm by 17 cm). The text is written elegantly in one column per page, in 24 lines per page.

The text is divided according to the κεφαλαια (chapters), whose numbers are given at the margin, and their τιτλοι (titles) at the top of the pages. There is also a division according to the Αmmonian Sections (in Mark 241 Sections, the last in 16:20), with references to the Eusebian Canons (written below Ammomnian Section numbers).

It contains the Epistula ad Carpianum, Eusebian Canon tables, Prolegomena, tables of the κεφαλαια (tables of contents) before each Gospel, pictures, subscriptions at the end of each Gospel, numbers of στιχοι, Synaxarion, and Menologion.

== Text ==
The Greek text of the codex is a representative of the Byzantine text-type. Hermann von Soden classified it to the textual family K^{x}. Aland placed it in Category V. According to the Claremont Profile Method it represents textual family K^{x} in Luke 1, Luke 10, and Luke 20. It creates also a cluster 413.

It contains the Pericope Adulterae (John 7:53-8:11). In John 8:8 it has additional reading ενος εκαστου αυτων τας αμαρτιας (sins of every one of them) as Codex Nanianus, Minuscule 73, 95, 331, 364, 658, 700, 782, and other manuscripts.

== History ==
The manuscript was written by Theodosius. It once belonged to the monastery on Sinai peninsula.

Wiedmann and J. G. J. Braun collated some portions of the manuscript for Scholz (1794-1852). The manuscript was added to the list of New Testament manuscripts by Scholz. C. R. Gregory saw it in 1886.

The manuscript is currently housed at the Biblioteca Marciana (Gr. I. 20) in Venice.

== See also ==
- List of New Testament minuscules
- Biblical manuscript
- Textual criticism
