= Codex Basiliensis A. N. IV. 1 =

Greek minuscule manuscript of the New Testament

Minuscule 2
- New Testament manuscript
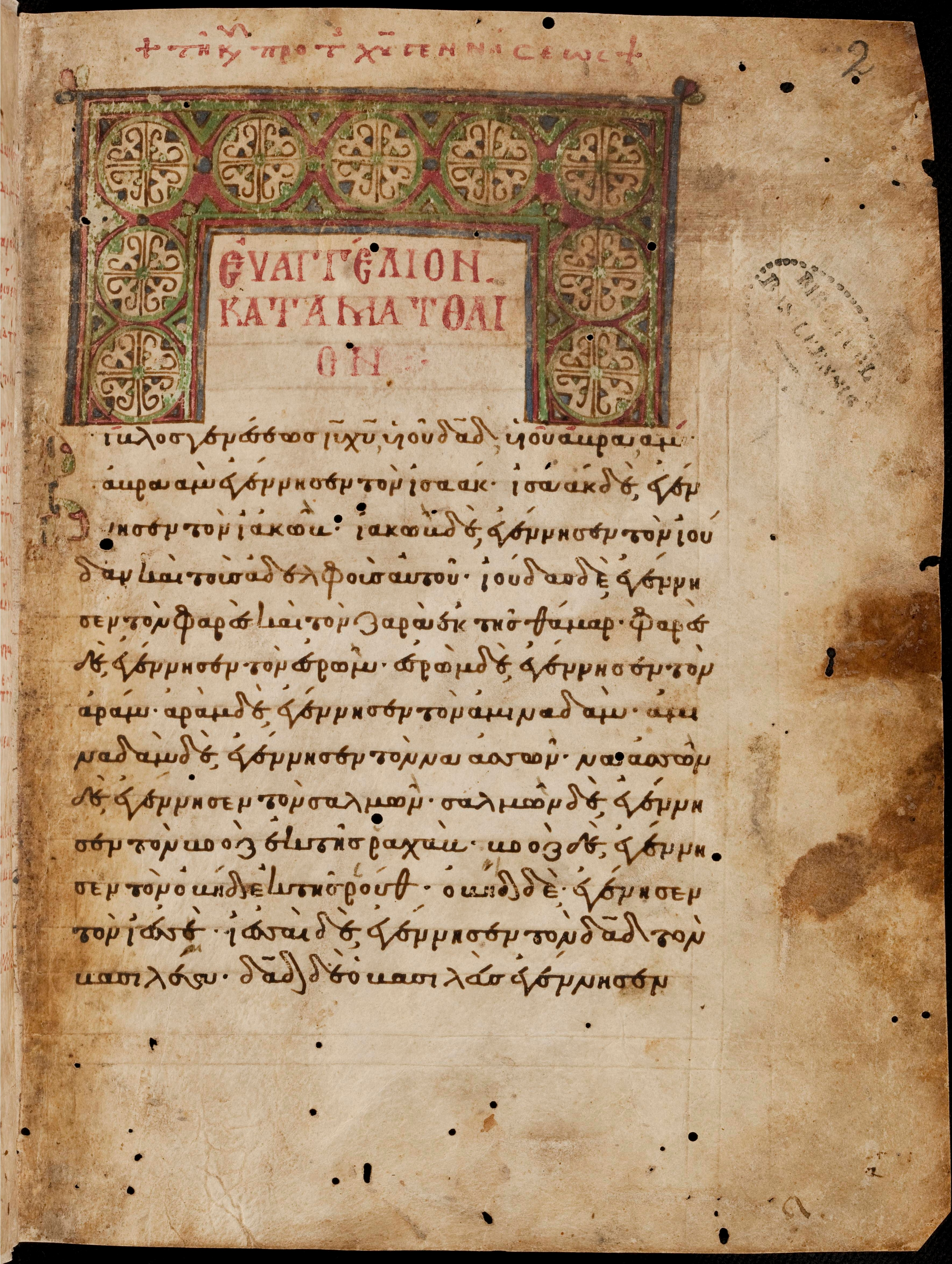
- Name: Codex Basiliensis A. N. IV. 1
- Text: Gospels
- Date: 11th/12th century
- Script: Greek
- Now at: University of Basel
- Size: 19.5 cm by 15.2 cm
- Type: Byzantine text-type
- Category: V
- Note: Textus Receptus

Codex Basiliensis A. N. IV. 1, known as Minuscule 2 (in the Gregory-Aland numbering of New Testament manuscripts), ε 1214 (in von Soden's numbering of New Testament manuscripts), is a Greek minuscule manuscript of the New Testament, written on parchment. Using the study of comparative writing styles (palaeography), it has been dated to the 11th or 12th century. The manuscript has complex contents. It is one of several Greek New Testament manuscripts housed at the Basel University Library, all of which take their name from the Latin adjective for Basel.

It was used by biblical scholar Desiderius Erasmus Roterodamus in his edition of the Greek text of the New Testament, and became the basis for the Textus Receptus in the Gospels. Red chalk was used to mark on the manuscript as to how to produce the page format for Erasmus and his first published edition of the New Testament (by either Erasmus or someone else in the printing house), along with other marginal notes written in his hand.

== Description ==
The manuscript is a codex (precursor to the modern book), containing the complete text of the four Gospels on 248 parchment leaves (size 19.5 cm by 15.2 cm) with the text covering only 13.6 cm by 9.9 cm of each page. The text is written in 1 column, 20 lines per page, in minuscule letters written in light-brown ink, and contains ornaments in colour, with the initial letters in red ink. The manuscript is replete with itacism errors (this being the confusion of like-sounding letters, specifically confusing ει and η), which Erasmus corrected so often that in certain places he incorrectly changed a correct spelling to a wrong one. Breathing marks (utilised to designate vowel emphasis) and accent marks (used to indicate voiced pitch changes) are also often incorrect.

The text is divided according to the chapters (known as κεφαλαια / kephalaia), whose numbers are given in the margin (except in the Gospel of John), and the titles of chapters (known as τιτλοι / titloi) at the top of the pages. There is also another division according to the smaller Ammonian Sections (an early division of the Gospels into sections). Matthew has 359 divisions; Mark has 240; Luke has 342; and John has 231. This is different to the standard divisions, of which there are commonly: 355, 235, 343, and 232 (Matt-Mark-Luke-John) respectively. There are no references to the Eusebian Canons (another early division of the Gospels into sections, and where parallel passages are found). The tables of contents (also known as κεφαλαια) are placed before each Gospel, along with subscriptions at the end of each Gospel. Some leaves of the codex were lost, but the text of the Gospels has survived in a complete condition.

Biblical scholar C. C. Tarelli describes the writing as "a very fair example of the standard minuscule book hand which prevailed from the tenth century to the twelfth [century]", stating that the date for the manuscript could "hardly be later than [the 12th century]", and "might even be earlier". Erasmus wrote numerous corrections and alterations in the margins and between the already written lines of the manuscript, using a "pale-brown watery ink of thin line", which according to scholar Kenneth W. Clark, his notes are "so inconspicuous that to pick them out requires the closest attention".

== Text ==
The Greek text of the codex is considered a representative of the majority Byzantine text-type. The text-types are groups of different New Testament manuscripts which share specific or generally related readings, which then differ from each other group, and thus the conflicting readings can separate out the groups. These are then used to determine the original text as published; there are three main groups with names: Alexandrian, Western, and Byzantine. Based on shared readings with other manuscripts, Hermann von Soden classified it to his textual family K^{x}, a sub-group of Byzantine witnesses. Biblical scholar Kurt Aland placed it in Category V of his New Testament manuscript text classification system. Category V is for "Manuscripts with a purely or predominantly Byzantine text." According to the Claremont Profile Method (a specific analysis method of textual data), it has a mixed Byzantine text in Luke 1. In Luke 10 and Luke 20 it represents K^{x}.

Several of the singular readings of the manuscript are omissions, most of which are due to errors of sight such as homoeoteleuton (the omitting of words when one word is followed by another with the same letters at the end). Additions are "rarer", and those which are included are possibly due to influence from liturgical readings. The text of minuscule 2 is also nearly that of the text seen in Codex Basilensis (E), which is postulated by scholar C. C. Tarelli to "almost have been the exemplar from which [minuscule 2] was copied". Biblical scholar Caspar René Gregory described the manuscript as "schlecht" (poor) and "wimmelt von Schreibfehlern" (teeming with scribal errors).

In Matthew 16:2-3, the manuscript doesn't have the entirety of the two verses, which are inserted in the margin at a later date in the 16th century. In Mark 1:15, it doesn't include ὅτι πεπλήρωται ὁ καιρὸς καὶ ἤγγικεν ἡ βασιλεία τοῦ θεοῦ (that the time is complete and the kingdom of God is near), an omission shared with minuscule 3 and 73, however which may have been made independently by the copyist of minuscule 2. In Luke 6:28, it lacks the phrase προσεύχεσθε ὑπὲρ τῶν ἐπηρεαζόντων ὑμᾶς (pray on behalf of those who mistreat you). It was added by a corrector in the lower margin. In John 8:6, it originally read μὴ προσποιούμενος (not paying any attention), which was subsequently erased by a corrector (believed to be Erasmus). This variant is also seen in the manuscripts Codex Basilensis (F), Codex Seidelianus (G), Codex Cyprius (K), Codex Vaticanus 354 (S), Codex Petropolitanus (Π), Minuscule 579, and a large proportion of the Byzantine manuscripts. It is not included by the manuscripts Codex Campianus (Μ), Codex Nanianus (U), Codex Tischendorfianus IV (Γ), Codex Athous Dionysiou (Ω), Uncial 047, and Minuscule 7, 8, 9, 196, 461^{c2}, 1203, 1216, 1243, 1514, and lectionary ℓ 663. Erasmus did not use this phrase in his Novum Testamentum (an early critical edition of the Greek New Testament).

== History of the codex ==
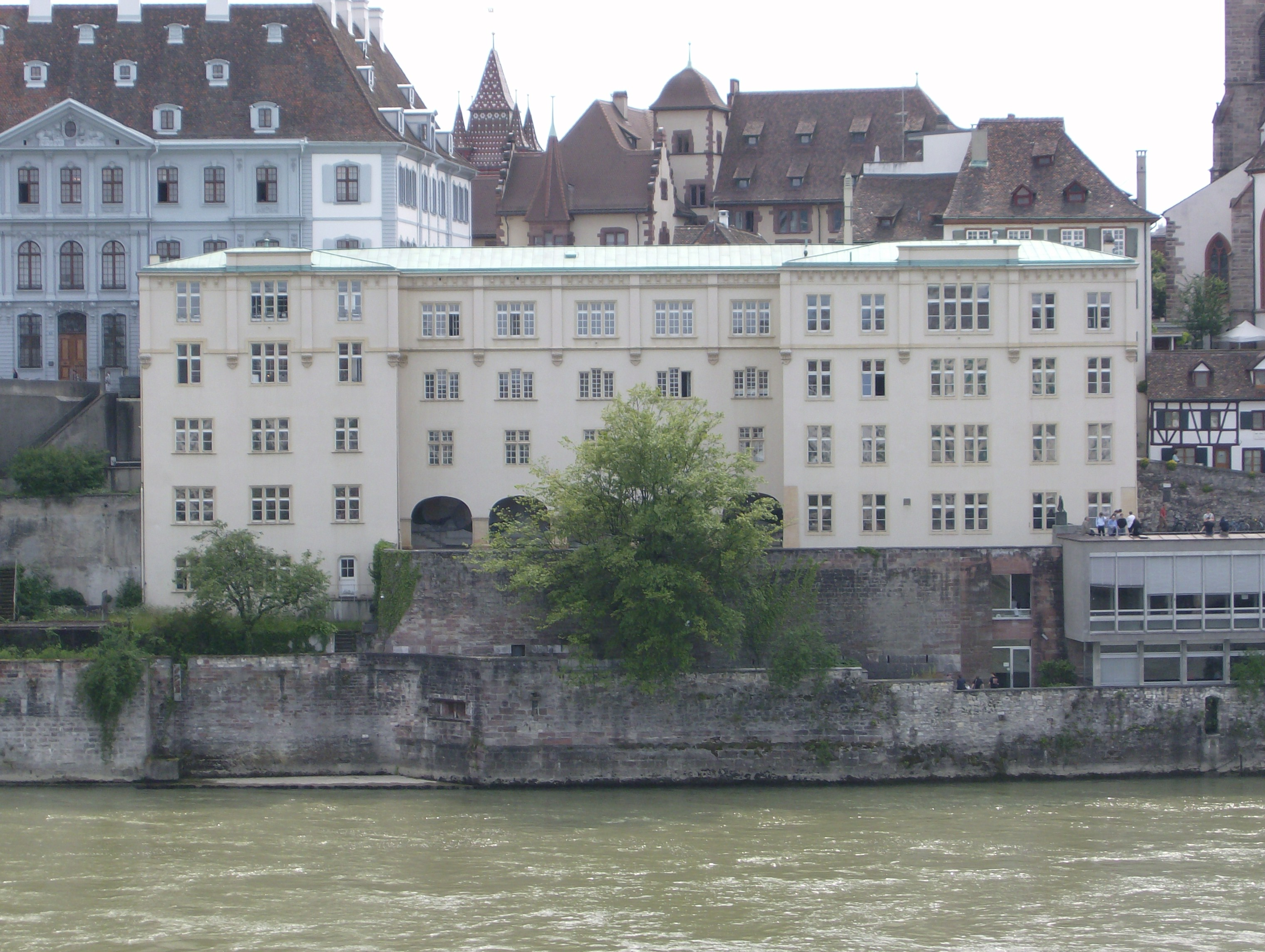
Old University Basel

The early story of the manuscript and its provenance is unknown. The codex was bought by monks at Basel for the price of two Rhenish florins (currency of the Rhineland in the 14–15th century), as per a 15th century note on the last page. Since 1559 it has been held in the library of the University of Basel.

When scholar Desiderius Erasmus moved to Basel in 1514, he received this codex from the Dominican friars at Basel and used it to underlie the Gospels portion of the first edition of his Novum Testamentum, which was published in 1516. Press corrections for the printing format are written on the pages, and according to biblical scholar Frederick H. A. Scrivener it was "barbarously scored with red chalk" to suit Erasmus' page format, of which these marks represent Erasmus' "alterations and emendations" based on other manuscripts. Scholar Kenneth Clark instead attributes the red chalk/crayon markings to the printer, either the printing house owner Froben or another staff member. However, subsequent scholars have not repeated this attribution and still state the markings were done by Erasmus himself. The original Greek page marks are usually written over with Western used numerals. 130 marginal corrections are from Erasmus, with 55 of these appearing in the Gospel of Matthew. Another hand added chapter numbers. Several smudges or probably ink stains appear on the manuscript, which may indicate that the manuscript was used in the book publisher's printing room. For subsequent editions of his Novum Testamentum, Erasmus introduced readings from other manuscripts.

Biblical scholar Robert Estienne did not directly consult this manuscript to use in his Editio Regia (another critical edition of the Greek New Testament first published in 1546), but since his edition was based on the Erasmian text, several of minuscule 2's readings are found in the Textus Receptus (the name eventually given to Estienne's editions of the Greek New Testament). Though many have stated minuscule 2 was the "basis" for the Textus Receptus, Erasmus himself corrected many of its omissions, introduced emendations, and according to Tarelli "departed so frequently from 2 that he can hardly be said to have derived his text 'mainly' from this manuscript." Many of Erasmus' readings appear to have come from Minuscule 1, another of the Basel manuscripts, and can be said to be "too numerous to be accidental." Several variant readings that depart from the text in minuscule 2 appear to have correlations with the Latin Vulgate.

German classicist and historian Martin Crusius used this manuscript in 1577 and noted variant readings. The manuscript was examined by biblical scholar Johann Albrecht Bengel (who labelled it as codex β and noted variant readings), biblical scholars Johann Jakob Wettstein (also noting variant readings), Dean Burgon, Herman C. Hoskier, and Gregory. According to biblical scholars Bruce M. Metzger and Scrivener, it is one of the "inferior manuscripts" used by Erasmus. Wettstein gave it number 2 on his list, and this siglum has remained since being incorporated into the Gregory-Aland numbered list of New Testament manuscripts. The codex is currently located at the Basel University Library (shelf number A.N. IV. 1) at Basel, Switzerland.

== See also ==
- List of New Testament minuscules
- Textual criticism
