= Minuscule 817 =

- New Testament manuscript
- Name: Codex Basiliensis A. N. III, 15
- Text: Gospels
- Date: 15th century
- Script: Greek
- Now at: Basel University Library
- Size: 29 cm by 21 cm
- Type: Byzantine text-type
- Category: none
- Note: –

Codex Basiliensis A. N. III, 15, also known as Minuscule 817 (in the Gregory-Aland numbering), Θ^{ε52} (von Soden), is a Greek minuscule manuscript of the New Testament written on paper, with a commentary. It was used by Erasmus. Palaeographically it has been assigned to the 15th century.

== Description ==
The codex contains the complete text of the four Gospels, on 255 paper leaves (size 29 cm by 21 cm).

The text is written in one column per page, 34–46 lines per page.

It contains Prolegomena, tables of the κεφαλαια (tables of contents) before each of the Gospels, and a commentary of Theophylact.

== Text ==
The Greek text of the codex is a representative of the Byzantine text-type. Aland did not place it in any category.

It was not examined according to the Claremont Profile Method.

It lacks the Pericope Adulterae (John 7:53–8:11).

In John 1:45 it reads Ιησουν τον υιον Ιωσηφ (Jesus, son of Joseph) along with manuscripts: Alexandrinus, Cyprius, Campianus, Macedoniensis, Sangallensis, Petropolitanus, Uncial 047, 7, 8, 196, 461, 1514, 1519; majority of the manuscripts read Ιησουν τον υιον του Ιωσηφ;

In John 4:51 it reads υιος (son) for παις (servant), the reading of the codex is supported by Codex Bezae, Cyprius, Petropolitanus Purpureus, Petropolitanus, Nanianus, 0141, 33, 194, 196, 743, 892, 1192, 1216, 1241.

== History ==
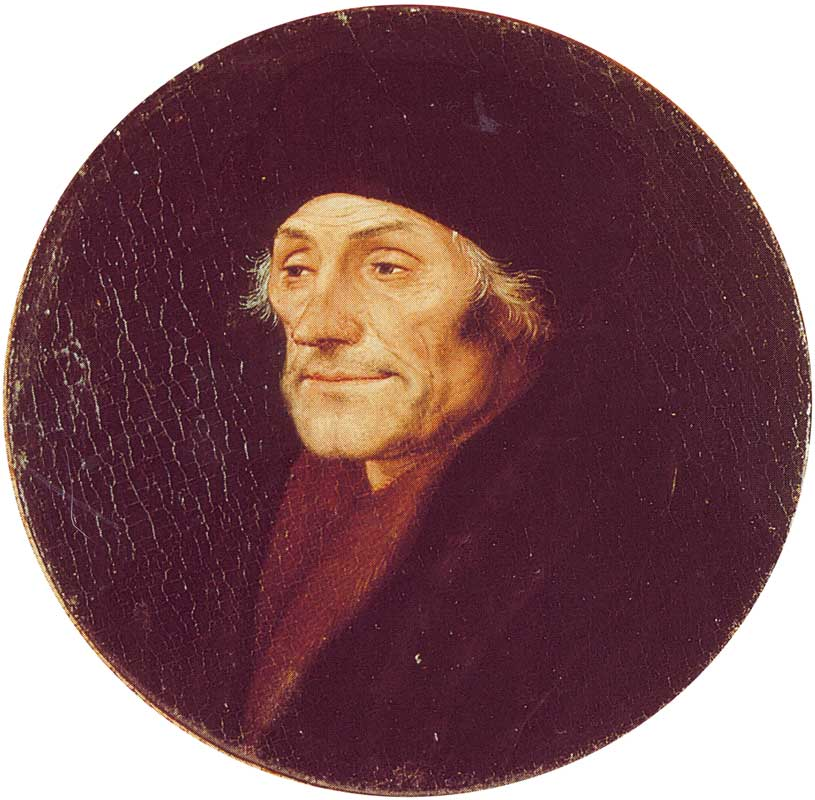
Desiderius Erasmus (1466–536)

The manuscript was dated by Gregory to the 15th century. The manuscript is currently dated by the INTF to the 15th century.

The early story of the manuscript and its provenance is unknown. It was held at the Dominican monastery in Basel in the beginning of the 16th century. Since 1559 it was held at the University of Basel.

Desiderius Erasmus received this codex from the Dominican friars in Basel, and used it for the first edition of his Novum Instrumentum omne (1516). Robert Estienne did not use this manuscript in his Editio Regia (1550), but his edition was based on the Erasman text. As a result, some of its readings appear in the Textus Receptus.

It was added to the list of New Testament manuscripts by Gregory (817^{e}). Gregory saw it in 1885.

The manuscript is now housed at the Basel University Library with the shelf number A. N. III, 15.

== See also ==
- List of New Testament minuscules
- Biblical manuscript
- Textual criticism
- Minuscule 2
