= Brugsch =

Brugsch is a surname. Notable people with the surname include:

- Heinrich Karl Brugsch (1827–1894), German Egyptologist
- Theodor Brugsch (1878–1963), German internist and politician
- Émile Brugsch (1842–1930), German Egyptologist
