= Minuscule 658 =

- New Testament manuscript
- Text: Gospels
- Date: 12th/13th century
- Script: Greek
- Now at: Jagiellonian Library
- Size: 21 cm by 15 cm
- Type: ?
- Category: none

Minuscule 658 (in the Gregory-Aland numbering), ε 1215 (von Soden), is a Greek minuscule manuscript of the New Testament, on parchment. Palaeographically it has been assigned to the 12th or 13th century. The manuscript has complex contents. Scrivener labelled it by 636^{e}.

== Description ==
The codex contains the complete text of the four Gospels, on 220 parchment leaves (size 21 cm by 15 cm). The text is written in one column per page, 29 lines per page.

The text is divided according to the κεφαλαια (chapters), at the margin, with τιτλοι (titles) at the top. There is also another division according to the smaller Ammonian Sections (in Mark 241 sections, the last section of Mark is ended in 16:20), with references to the Eusebian Canons. References to the Eusebian Canons are written in the same line with the Ammonian Sections (unusual).

It contains Epistula ad Carpianum, the Eusebian tables (before four Gospels), the lists of the κεφαλαια (before every Gospel), lectionary markings, Synaxarion, and Menologion.

It contains also 8 lessons from various texts of the Pauline epistles.

== Text ==
Kurt Aland did not place the Greek text of the codex in any formal Category. The text of the manuscript was not examined by using the Claremont Profile Method. In result its textual character is still unknown.

This codex' version of John 8:8 contains a textual variant: ἕνος ἑκάστου αὐτῶν τὰς ἁμαρτίας (the sins of every one of them); the same textual variant is found in certain other manuscripts: Codex Nanianus, Minuscule 73, 331, 364, 700, 782, 1592, Old Latin manuscripts, and Armenian manuscripts.

== History ==
Scrivener dated the manuscript to the 12th or 13th century, Gregory dated it to the 12th century. Currently the manuscript is dated by the INTF to the 12th or 13th century.

The manuscript was presented by Presbyter Nicephorus in 1291 to the Saint Catherine's Monastery in the Sinai Peninsula. It was brought from Sinai to Berlin by Heinrich Brugsch (along with the codex 653 and Minuscule 654). Wilhelm Wattenbach published a facsimile of one pager of the codex in 1876. Gregory saw the manuscript in 1887. It was housed in Berlin in the Preußische Königliche Bibliothek (then Prussian State Library, then Berlin State Library) with the shelf-number Gr. quarto 47.

At the end of 1943, the frequency of the bombing of Berlin increased. The Prussian State Library sent many collections out of Berlin to be sheltered in Silesia for safekeeping. As the result of postwar border changes some of these collections were found in Poland (among them minuscule 658). They were moved to the Jagiellonian University Library.

Currently the manuscript is housed at the Biblioteka Jagiellońska (Fonds der Berliner Handschriften, Graec. quarto 47), in Kraków.

== See also ==
- List of New Testament minuscules
- Biblical manuscript
- Textual criticism
