= Minuscule 95 =

- New Testament manuscript
- Text: Gospel of Luke, Gospel of John †
- Date: 12th century
- Script: Greek
- Found: 1676, Sir George Wheler
- Now at: Lincoln College, Oxford
- Size: 27.3 cm by 20.5 cm
- Type: Byzantine text-type
- Category: V
- Hand: neatly written

Minuscule 95 (in the Gregory-Aland numbering), A^{212} (von Soden), is a Greek minuscule manuscript of the New Testament, on parchment leaves. Palaeographically it has been assigned to the 12th century. It has marginalia.

== Description ==
The codex contains the text of the Gospel of Luke (11:2-24:53); John 1:1-7:1; 7:18-20:30; 21:11-25 on 110 leaves (size 27.3 cm by 20.5 cm) with a commentary. The text is written in one column per page, 20 lines per page. The initial letters are written in red.

The text is divided according to the κεφαλαια (chapters), whose numbers of at the margin. There is also a division according to the Ammonian Sections (later hand), (no references to the Eusebian Canons).

It contains full scholia neatly written on the margin, synaxaria, and Menologion.

== Text ==
The Greek text of the codex is a representative of the Byzantine text-type. Aland placed it in Category V. It was not examined by the Claremont Profile Method.

It contains the Pericope Adulterae (John 7:53-8:11) but with questionable scholion on the margin: ταυτα μετα και του κεφαλαιου της μοιχαλιδος. Εν τισι των αντιγραφων ωβελισται.

In John 8:8 it has textual variant ενος εκαστου αυτων τας αμαρτιας (sins of every one of them), as in Codex Nanianus, 73, 331, 413, Minuscule 700, and some other manuscripts.

== History ==
Sir George Wheler brought the manuscript from Constantinople to England in 1676 (together with the codex 68 and ℓ 3).

It was examined by Mill (as Wheeleri 2), and Nicoll (John 5-7 for Scholz). C. R. Gregory saw it in 1883.

It is owned by Lincoln College, Oxford, on deposit with the Bodleian Library as Lincoln College MS. Gr. 16.

== See also ==
- List of New Testament minuscules
- Biblical manuscript
- Textual criticism
