= Minuscule 225 =

- New Testament manuscript
- Text: Gospels
- Date: 1192
- Script: Greek
- Now at: Biblioteca Nazionale Vittorio Emanuele III
- Size: 13.7 cm by 9.8 cm
- Type: Byzantine text-type
- Category: none
- Note: the Lord's Prayer has unusual ending

Minuscule 225 (in the Gregory-Aland numbering of New Testament manuscripts), ε 1210 (in the von Soden numbering of New Testament manuscripts), is a Greek minuscule manuscript of the New Testament, written on parchment. A colophon dates it to the year 1192. It was adapted for liturgical use. The manuscript contains the complete text of the four Gospels and its text is considered a representative of the Byzantine text-type.

== Description ==
The manuscript is a codex (precursor to the modern book) containing the complete text of the four Gospels, on 171 parchment leaves (size 13.7 cm by 9.8 cm). The text is written in one column per page, 29 lines per page.

It contains pictures, lectionary markings at the margin, lessons, the synaxaria (list of Saint's feast days), and Menologion.

The Pericope Adulterae (John 7:53-8:11) is placed after John 7:36.

== Text ==
The Greek text of this codex is considered a representative of the Byzantine text-type. According to textual critic Hermann von Soden it represents the Antiocheian commentated text. Biblical scholar Kurt Aland did not place it in any Category of his New Testament manuscript classification system.

According to the Claremont Profile Method (a specific analysis of textual data) it has mixed Byzantine text in Luke 1. In Luke 10 and Luke 20 it belongs to the textual group 1167.

In Matthew 6:13 it has an unusual ending of the Lord's Prayer:

ὅτι σοῦ ἐστιν ἡ βασιλεία καὶ ἡ δύναμις καὶ ἡ δόξα, τοῦ πατρὸς καὶ τοῦ υἱοῦ καὶ τοῦ ἁγίου πνεύματος εἰς τοὺς αἰῶνας. ἀμήν (For yours is the kingdom, and the power, and the glory, of the Father and of the Son and of the Holy Spirit, forever. Amen.)

There are only two other known manuscripts with this same ending: Minuscule 157 and 418.

In John 8:10 it reads Ιησους ειδεν αυτην και (Jesus saw her, and) along with Codex Nanianus (U), Codex Tischendorfianus III (Λ), ƒ^{13}, 700, 1077, 1443, Lectionary 185^{mg}, and some Ethiopic manuscripts. The Majority of manuscripts read: Ιησους και μηδενα θεασαμενος πλην της γυναικος (..Jesus, and seeing no one except the woman) or just Ιησους (..Jesus).

== History ==
The manuscript was examined and described by Herman Treschow, a priest and professor of Theology at the University of Copenhagen in Denmark. The biblical scholar Francis Karl Alter made a full collation of the manuscript against the Textus Receptus. Alter used it in his edition of the Greek text of the New Testament. Biblical scholar C. R. Gregory saw it in 1887.

It was formerly held at the Imperial Library (shelf number Suppl. Gr. 102) in Vienna. It is currently housed at the Biblioteca Nazionale (shelf number Cod. Neapol. ex Vind. 9), at Naples.

== See also ==
- List of New Testament minuscules
- Biblical manuscript
- Textual criticism
