= Minuscule 157 =

Greek minuscule of the New Testament, circa 1122

- New Testament manuscript
- Full-page miniature of the Nativity
- Name: Vaticanus Urbinas graecus 2 (Vat. Urb. gr. 2)
- Text: Gospels
- Date: 1122
- Script: Greek
- Now at: Vatican Library
- Size: 18.6 cm by 13.6 cm
- Type: mixed
- Category: III
- Hand: beautifully written
- Note: full marginalia

Minuscule 157 is an illuminated Greek minuscule manuscript of the New Testament Gospels, written on parchment. It is designated by the siglum 157 in the Gregory-Aland numbering of New Testament manuscripts, and ε207 in the von Soden numbering of New Testament manuscripts. According to the colophon it is dated to the year 1122. The date had been wrongly deciphered formally as 1128 (Gregory, Thompson). It has complex contents and full marginal notations.

== Description ==
The manuscript is a codex (precursor to the modern book format) containing the complete text of the four Gospels on 325 parchment leaves (sized 18.6 cm by 13.6 cm). The text is written in one column per page, with 22 lines per page. The text is divided according to the chapters (known as κεφαλαια / kephalaia), whose tables of contents are given before each Gospel (also known as κεφαλαια / kephalaia), the chapter numbers are noted in the page marginss, and their titles (known as τιτλοι / titloi) are written at the top of the pages. There is no division according to the Eusebian Canons (an early system of dividing the four Gospels into different sections), though the Eusebian Canon tables are placed at the beginning. Corrections in the manuscript can be mostly ascribed to the original copyist, who upon noticing a mistake whitened it out with paint, and then continued on with their copying of the correct letter or word. Any remaining "glaring" errors are likely a reflection of the manuscript which was being copied from (known as the exemplar).

It contains the Epistle to Carpian, prolegomena, lectionary equipment, subscriptions at the end of each Gospel, ornaments and pictures in vermilion and gold. The Gospel of John is preceded by a portrait of John the Evangelist with Prochorus, one of the seven Hellenstic Jewish deacons appointed in Acts 6:5.

It has the famous Jerusalem Colophon ("copied and corrected from the ancient manuscripts of Jerusalem preserved on the Holy Mountain"), at the end of each Gospel. According to biblical scholar Frederick H. A. Scrivener, it is very beautifully written. This sentiment is echoed by Biblical Scholar Herman C. Hoskier, who describes it as a "most beautiful manuscript" and which was "prepared with the utmost care".

Subscriptions to the Gospels
Gospel	Greek	English
Matthew	ἐυαγγέλιον κατα Ματθαῖον ἐγράφη καἰ ἀντεβλήθη ἐκ τῶν ἐν Ἱεροσολυμοις παλαιῶν ἀντιγράφων τῶν ἐν τῷ ἁγιῳ ὄρει ἀποκειμενων; ἐν στίχοις ,Β̅Υ̅Π̅Δ̅ κεφαλαίοις τριακοσίοις πεντηκοντα ἑπτα:	Gospel according to Matthew. Copied and corrected from the ancient manuscripts in Jerusalem preserved on the Holy Mountain. 2484 lines. Three hundred and fifty seven chapters.
Mark	ἐυαγγέλιον κατὰ Μάρκον. ἐγράφη καἰ ἀντεβλήθη ὁμοίως ἐκ τῶν ἐσπουδασμένων; ἐν στίχοις χιλίοις πεντακοσίοις, πεντήκοντα. Κεφαλαίοις Σ̅Λ̅Δ̅:	Gospel according to Mark. Copied and corrected likewise from the best ones. One thousand five hundred and fifty lines. 234 chapters.
Luke	ἐυαγγέλιον κατα Λουκᾶν. ἐγράφη καἰ ἀντεβλήθη ὁμοίως ἐκ τῶν αὐτῶν ἀντιγράφων. ἐν στίχοις ,Β̅Ψ̅Ξ̅. κεφαλαίοις Τ̅Μ̅Β̅ + + +	Gospel according to Luke. Copied and corrected likewise from the same manuscripts. 2760 lines. 342 chapters.
John	ἐυαγγέλιον κατὰ Ἱωάννην. ἐγράφη καἰ ἀντεβλήθη ὁμοίως ἐκ τῶν αὐτῶν ἀντιγράφων. ἐν στίχοις ,Α̅Ϡ̅Λ̅. κεφαλαίοις Σ̅Λ̅Β̅:	Gospel according to John. Copied and corrected from the ancient copies in Jerusalem preserved on the Holy Mountain. 1930 lines. 232 chapters.

== Text ==
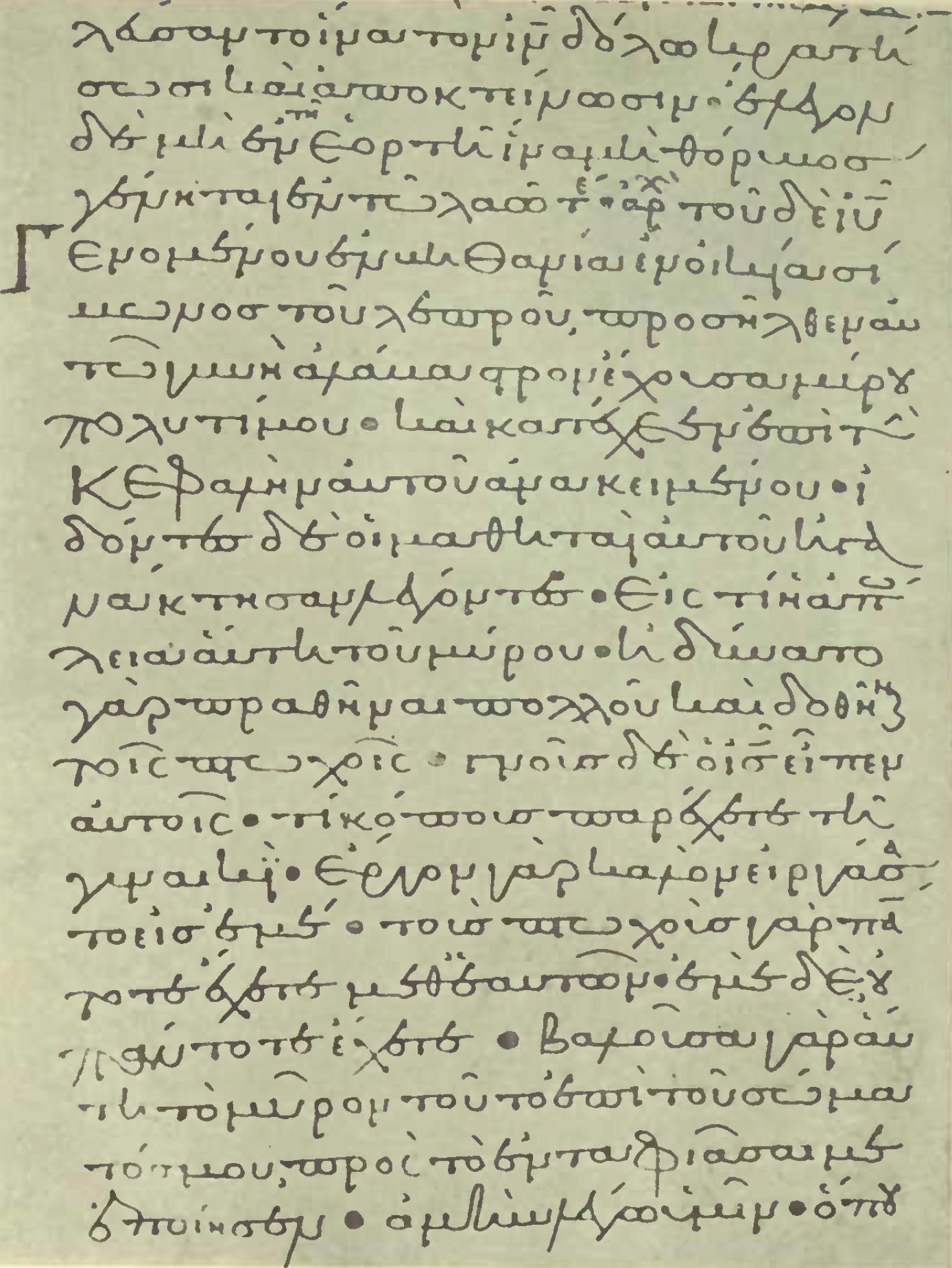

Although the manuscript was made for the Byzantine Emperor, its text is not considered to be the standard Byzantine text-type, but appears to be a mixture of text-types with a strong Alexandrian element. The text-types are groups of different New Testament manuscripts which share specific or generally related readings, which then differ from each other group, and thus the conflicting readings can separate out the groups. These are then used to determine the original text as published; there are three main groups with names: Alexandrian, Western, and Byzantine. Its readings often agree with Codex Bezae (D), with some affinities to the Diatessaron (an early harmonisation of the four canonical Gospels into one continuous work), and to the Gnostic Heretic Marcion's text of Luke (see Gospel of Marcion).

Textual critic Hermann von Soden lists it among his text-group I^{Σ}, along with codices 235, 245, 291, 713, and 1012, and he considers minuscule 157 the best representative of this text-group. Textual critic Kurt Aland placed it in Category III of his New Testament manuscript classification system. Category III manuscripts are described as having "a small but not a negligible proportion of early readings, with a considerable encroachment of [Byzantine] readings, and significant readings from other sources as yet unidentified." According to the Claremont Profile Method (a specific analysis of textual data), it represents K^{x} in Luke 1; in Luke 10 it is mixed with some relationship to the Alexandrian text; in Luke 20 it has the Alexandrian text.

In Matthew 6:13 it has an unusual ending to the Lord's Prayer:

ὅτι σοῦ ἐστιν ἡ βασιλεία καὶ ἡ δύναμις καὶ ἡ δόξα, τοῦ πατρὸς καὶ τοῦ υἱοῦ καὶ τοῦ ἁγίου πνεύματος εἰς τοὺς αἰῶνας. ἀμήν (For thine is the kingdom and the power and the glory, of the Father and of the Son and of the Holy Spirit for ever. Amen.)

This ending is only found in two other manuscripts: Minuscule 225 and 418. In Matthew 13:15 it reads: Ἰωσῆ (Joses); the reading is supported by the manuscripts Minuscule 118 700* 1071 syr^{h} bo^{mss}. It does not include the text of Matthew 16:2b–3 or of the Pericope Adulterae (John 7:53-8:11).

== History ==
It was written in 1122 for the Byzantine Emperor John Porphyrogenitus (1118-1143). The manuscript belonged to the Ducal Library at Urbino, and was brought to Rome by Pope Clement VII (1523-1534).

In 1788 scholar Andreas Birch made a facsimile of the manuscript. According to Birch, it is the most important manuscript of the New Testament except for Codex Vaticanus. It was examined by scholar Johann Scholz, and collated by biblical scholar Herman C. Hoskier. Biblical scholar Caspar René Gregory saw it in 1886. Scrivener noted that this codex often agrees with codices Vaticanus (B), Bezae (D), Regius (L), 69, 106, and especially with Minuscule 1.

It is currently housed at the Vatican Library (shelf number Urbinas gr. 2), in Rome, Italy.

== See also ==
- Minuscule 158
- Minuscule 156
- List of New Testament minuscules
- Byzantine illuminated manuscripts
