= Uncial 030 =

- New Testament manuscript
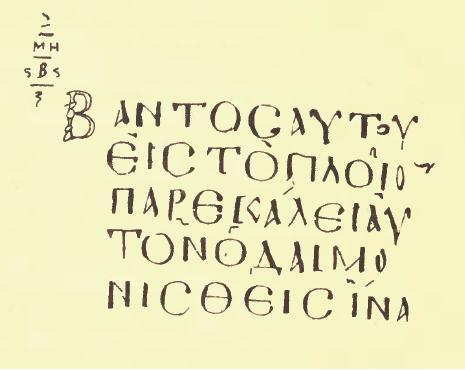
- Mark 5:18 (Tregelles facsimile edition)
- Name: Nanianus; Venetus Marcianus
- Sign: U
- Text: Gospels
- Date: 9th century
- Script: Greek
- Now at: Biblioteca Marciana, Venice
- Size: 22.5 cm by 16.7 cm
- Type: Byzantine text-type
- Category: V
- Hand: carefully written
- Note: Unique addition in John 8:8

Uncial 030 or Codex Nanianus is a Greek uncial manuscript of the New Testament Gospels, written on parchment. It is designated by the siglum U or 030 in the Gregory-Aland numbering of New Testament manuscripts, and ε 90 in the von Soden numbering of New Testament manuscripts. Using the study of comparative writing styles (palaeography), it has been assigned to the 9th century CE. The manuscript has complex contents, with full marginalia (see picture).

The text of the codex usually follows the majority of New Testament manuscripts, but has some variants which represent the Alexandrian tradition. The manuscript is rarely cited in the present critical editions of the Greek New Testament.

== Description ==
The manuscript is a codex (the precursor to the modern book format), containing the complete text of the four New Testament Gospels written on 291 parchment leaves (sized 22.5 cm by 16.7 cm). The leaves are arranged in quarto form (this being four leaves placed on top of each other, and then folded in half to create a quire). The text is written with brown ink in two columns per page, with 21 lines per column.. According to biblical scholar Frederick H. A. Scrivener, the manuscript is "carefully and luxuriously" written. The manuscript has several ornaments and illuminations which are drawn in gold and other coloured ink.

The initial letters are written in gold ink and decorated. The letters are high, and round, and include breathings and accents. The letters are compressed only at the end of a line. Biblical scholar Samuel P. Tregelles found that the "letters are in general an imitation of those used before the introduction of compressed uncials; but they do not belong to the age when full and round writing was customary or natural, so that the stiffness and want of ease is manifest".

The manuscript has full marginalia, with the text divided according to the chapters (known as κεφάλαια / kephalaia), whose numbers are given in the margin, and their titles (known as τιτλοι / titloi) written at the top of the pages. There is another division according to the smaller Ammonian Sections, with reference to the Eusebian Canons (two early methods of dividing the Gospel text into sections). The number of sections in the Gospel of Mark is 233 (usually it is 235), the last section ending at 16:8.

It contains the Epistle to Carpius (a letter by the early Church Father Eusebius outlying his Gospel division and harmony system), the Eusebian tables at the beginning of the manuscript, the tables of contents (also known as κεφάλαια) before each Gospel, and subscriptions at the end of each Gospel. Before the Gospel of Mark it has a picture with the baptism of Jesus; before the Gospel of John it has a picture of John standing with the rays from the clouds above, and Prochorus (mentioned in the book of Acts) writing.

== Text ==
The text of the manuscript is considered to be a representative of the Byzantine text-type. The non-Byzantine readings find support from Codex Monacensis (X) and minuscule 1071, though there is no reason to believe these three manuscripts are related. The text has some relationship to the Codex Basilensis (E) and other textual members of the textual family Family E, but the manuscript does not belong to this family.

Textual critic Hermann von Soden classified its text as belonging to his textual group I^{o}, which refers to nine manuscripts in Luke. According to Soden the textual group I^{o} is a result of a recension by Pamphilus from Caeasarea (ca. 300 AD). Biblical scholar Kurt Aland placed it in Category V of his New Testament manuscript classification system, though it is not pure the Byzantine text, with a number non-Byzantine readings. Category V manuscripts are described as having "a purely or predominantly Byzantine text."

According to the Claremont Profile Method (a specific analysis of textual data), it represents textual family K^{x} in Luke 10, in Luke 1 and Luke 20 it has mixed Byzantine text. It is close to minuscules 974 and 1006 in Luke 1 and Luke 10.

The manuscript contains the texts of the Signs of the times (Matthew 16:2b-3), Christ's agony at Gethsemane (Luke 22:43-44), John 5:3.4, and the Pericope Adulterae (John 7:53-8:11) without any marks of spuriousness, which are considered inauthentic in the modern Critical editions. It contains the longer ending of Mark (16:9-20), but there are no Ammonian Sections or Eusebian Canons in the margin. In the text of the Pericope Adulterae, it has several peculiar readings (see below), some of which have textual affinities with Codex Tischendorfianus III (Λ).

=== Textual variants ===
==== Pericope Adulterae ====
John 8:2

βαθεος ελθεν ο Ιησους (Jesus came early) - U
παρεγενετο (He came) - Majority of manuscripts.

John 8:4

ειπον (said) - U Λ
λεγουσι (say) - Majority of manuscripts.

John 8:7

αναβλεψας (having looked up) - U Λ ƒ^{13} 700 1424^{(mg)}
ανακυψας (having stood up) - K Γ 579
ανεκυψεν (having lifted himself up) - Majority of manuscripts.

John 8:8

ενος εκαστου αυτων τας αμαρτιας (sins of every one of them) - U 73 95 264 (in John 8:6) 331 364 413 652^{c(mg)} 658 700 782 1592
omit. - Majority of manuscripts

John 8:10a

Ιησους ειδεν αυτην και (Jesus saw her and) - U Λ ƒ^{13} 225 700 1077 1443 ℓ 185^{mg} Ethiopic
Ιησους (Jesus) - D M S Γ ƒ^{1} ƒ^{13} c e ff^{2} g
Ιησους και μηδενα θεασαμενος πλην της γυναικος (...Jesus, and seeing no one except the woman) - Majority of manuscripts.

John 8:10b

που εισιν οι κατηγοροι σου (Where are those accusing you?) - U G, S ƒ^{13} 28 225 700 1009
που εισιν (Where are they?) - D M Γ Λ ƒ^{1} 892 1424^{(mg)}
που εισιν [εκεινοι] οι κατηγοροι σου (Where are those who were accusing you?) - E F H K 1079 Majority of manuscripts.

John 8:11

ειπεν δε αυτη ο Ιησους (Then said Jesus to her) - Γ 700
ο δε Ιησους ειπεν αυτη (Then Jesus said to her) - ƒ^{13} 1424^{(mg)}
ειπεν δε ο Ιησους (Then Jesus said) - Majority of manuscripts.

==== Some Alexandrian readings ====
Matthew 27:49

ἄλλος δὲ λαβὼν λόγχην ἒνυξεν αὐτοῦ τὴν πλευράν, καὶ ἐξῆλθεν ὖδορ καὶ αἳμα (the other took a spear and pierced His side, and immediately came out water and blood - see John 19:34) - U א B C L Γ 5 48 67 115 127* 1010 1293 syr^{pal} eth^{mss}
omit. - Majority of manuscripts

John 2:13

ο Ιησους εις Ιεροσολυμα (Jesus to Jerusalem) - U 𝔓^{66} 𝔓^{75} G L M Π 0211 1010 1505 ℓ 425, ℓ 640 al
εις Ιεροσολυμα ο Ιησους (to Jerusalem Jesus) - Majority of manuscripts.

==== Other readings ====
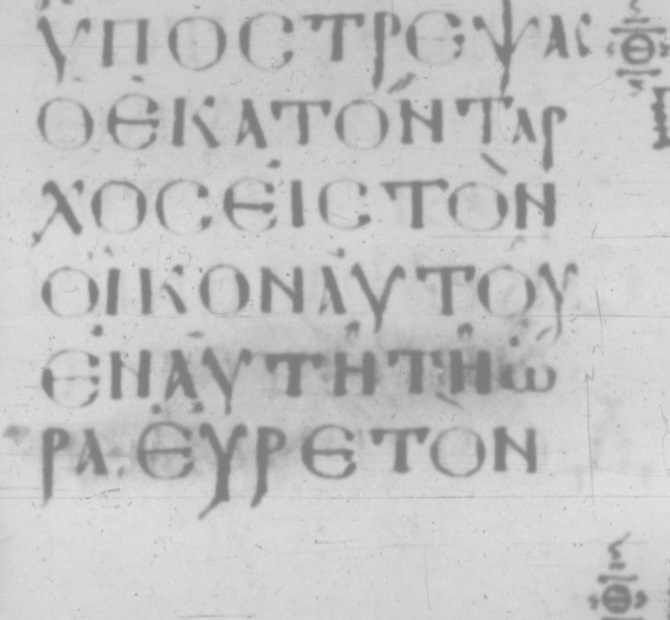
Interpolation in Matthew 8:13

Matthew 8:13

και υποστρεψας ο εκατονταρχος εις τον οικον αυτου εν αυτη τη ωρα ευρεν τον παιδα υγιαινοντα (and when the centurion returned to the house in that hour, he found the slave well) - U א C E* M Θ (0250) ƒ^{1} g^{1} syr^{h}
omit. - Majority of manuscripts

John 2:3

λέγει ἡ μήτηρ αὐτοῦ πρὸς αὐτόν (his mother said to him) - U
λέγει ἡ μήτηρ τοῦ Ἰησοῦ πρὸς αὐτόν (the mother of Jesus said to him) - Majority of manuscripts.

John 4:51

υιος (son) - U D K N Π 0141 33 194 196 743 817 892 1192 1216 1241
παις (servant) - Majority of manuscripts.

John 6:51

περι της του κοσμου ζωης (about the life of the world) - U
υπερ της του κοσμου ζωης (for the life of the world) - Majority of manuscripts.

John 6:67

μαθηταις (disciples) - U Θ
δωδεκα (twelve) - Majority of manuscripts.

John 7:34

και οπου ειμι εγω υμεις ου δυνασθε ελθειν (and where I am you cannot come)

omit. - U
incl. - All other manuscripts

== History ==
The codex is named after its last owner, Giovanni Nanni (1432–1502). It was described by Giovanni Luigi Mingarelli. The first person to collate its text was Friedrich Münter (1761–1830), who sent some extracts from its text to textual critic Andreas Birch. Birch used these extracts in his edition of the text of the four Gospels in Greek. Then Birch examined the manuscript himself and gave its description in 1801:

In Bibliotheca Equitis Nanii codex asservatur charactere unciali exaratus Seculo X vel XI, complectens Qvattuor Evangelia cum Eusebii Canonibus. De hoc plura vide in Catalogo Codd. graecorum, qvi apud Nanios asservantur, studio et opera Mingarelli publicatam. Excerpta hujus codicis in adnotationibus hinc inde obvia, mecum communicavit Vir. Cl. Münter, cui etiam debeo notitiam duorum codicum qvi seqvuntur.

In the Library of the Knight Nannius is preserved a codex in uncial character, written in the 10th or 11th century, comprising the Four Gospels with the Eusebian Canons. For more on this see the Catalogue of Greek Codices preserved in Nanii, published by Mingarelli. Excerpts of this codex, seen in the annotations here and there, were communicated to me by Sir Friedrich Münter, to whom I also owe the knowledge of the two codices which follow.

It was slightly examined by biblical scholar Johann M. A. Scholz. Scholar Thomas H. Horne gave this description of the codex:

The Codex Nanianus I., in the library of St. Mark, at Venice, contains the four Gospels with the Eusebian canons. It is nearly entire, and for the most part agrees with the Constantinopolitan recension. Dr. Birch, by whom it was first collated, refers it to the tenth of eleventh century; Dr. Scholz, to the tenth century.

The text of the manuscript was independently collated by textual critic and manuscript hunter Constantin von Tischendorf in 1843, and by biblical scholar Samuel P. Tregelles in 1846. They compared their work at Leipzig for the purpose of mutual correction. Tischendorf cited the manuscript in his Editio Octava Critica Maior. Biblical scholar Caspar Gregory saw the manuscript in 1886. William Hatch published one page of the codex as photographic facsimile in 1939.

Biblical scholar Bruce M. Metzger did not describe the manuscript in his The Text of the New Testament, or in Manuscripts of the Greek Bible, and it is one of the very few uncial manuscripts with sigla (01-045) not described by Metzger. The manuscript is rarely cited in critical editions of the Greek New Testament NA27/UBS4, where it falls under the "occasionally cited witnesses" category, this being "manuscripts essentially representing the Koine text-type." It is not mentioned in Introduction to the 26th edition of Novum Testamentum Graece of Nestle-Aland. It is often cited in The Gospel According to John in the Byzantine Tradition (2007).

Birch dated the manuscript to the 10 or 11th century. Scholz dated it to the 10th century. Scrivener writes that it dates "scarcely before the tenth century, although the letters are in general an imitation of those used before the introduction of compressed uncials". The present palaeographers dated the manuscript to the 9th century. Tregelles and Gregory dated it to the 9th or 10th century. The manuscript is currently located in the Biblioteca Marciana (shelf number ms Gr. I, 8 (=1397)) in Venice.

== See also ==
- List of New Testament uncials
- Textual criticism
- Biblical manuscript
