= Minuscule 597 =

- New Testament manuscript
- Text: Gospels
- Date: 13th century
- Script: Greek
- Now at: Biblioteca Marciana
- Size: 16.7 cm by 12.5 cm
- Type: Byzantine text-type
- Category: V

Minuscule 597 (in the Gregory-Aland numbering), ε 340 (von Soden), is a Greek minuscule manuscript of the New Testament, on parchment. Palaeographically it has been assigned to the 13th century. The manuscript has complex contents. It was labeled by Scrivener as 464.

== Description ==
The codex contains a complete text of the four Gospels on 259 parchment leaves (size 16.7 cm by 12.5 cm). The text is written in one column per page, 20-21 lines per page. The lists of the κεφαλαια (chapters) are placed before each Gospel, numerals of the κεφαλαια are given at the left margin, and their τιτλοι (titles) at the top. It contains lectionary markings, subscriptions at the end of each Gospel, and numbers of στιχοι were added by a later had.

== Text ==
The Greek text of the codex is a representative of the Byzantine text-type. According to Scrivener it has remarkable readings, but Hermann von Soden classified it as K^{x}. Aland placed it in Category V. According to the Wisse's Profile Method it represents textual group 291 in Luke 1, Luke 10, and Luke 20.

== History ==
Formerly it was held in "Archivo" in Venice. The manuscript was added to the list of New Testament manuscripts by Scrivener. Dean Burgon collated 16 chapters in the several Gospels. Gregory saw it in 1886.

The manuscript currently is housed at the Biblioteca Marciana (Gr. I,59 (1277)), at Venice.

== See also ==
- List of New Testament minuscules
- Biblical manuscript
- Textual criticism
