= Minuscule 291 =

- New Testament manuscript
- Text: Gospels
- Date: 13th century
- Script: Greek
- Now at: Bibliothèque nationale de France
- Size: 18.5 cm by 13.4 cm
- Type: Byzantine text-type
- Category: V
- Note: marginalia

Minuscule 291 (in the Gregory-Aland numbering), ε 377 (Soden), is a Greek minuscule manuscript of the New Testament, on parchment. Paleographically it has been assigned to the 13th century. The manuscript has complex contents. It has marginalia.

== Description ==
The codex contains a complete text of the four Gospels on 290 parchment leaves (18.5 cm by 13.4 cm). The text is written in one column per page, in 20 lines per page. The headpieces and large initials are ornamented with silver.

The text is divided according to the κεφαλαια (chapters), whose numbers are given at the margin, and their τιτλοι (titles of chapters) at the top of the pages. There is no division according to the Ammonian Sections, with references to the Eusebian Canons.

It contains Prolegomena, tables of the κεφαλαια (tables of contents) are placed before each Gospel, incipits, αναγνωσεις (lessons), Synaxarion, and marginal notes.

== Text ==
The Greek text of the codex is a representative of the Byzantine text-type. Hermann von Soden lists it as I^{s} (along with codices 157, 235, 245, 713, 1012). Aland placed it in Category V.

According to the Claremont Profile Method it creates textual group 291.

== Group 291 ==
The group shows some relationship to the Π groups. The profiles of the group 219 are:

Luke 1: 4, 6, (8), 14, (22), 34, (36).
Luke 10: 15, 18, 23, 25, 53, 57, (62), 63.
Luke 20: 13, 19, 26, 50, 60, 62, 66, 70.

Members of the group: 291, 139, 371, 449, 597, 1235, 1340, 2346, 2603, and 2728.

== History ==
The manuscript once belonged to Presbyter Nicholas. It was added to the list of New Testament manuscripts by Scholz (1794-1852). It was examined and described by Paulin Martin. C. R. Gregory saw it in 1885.

The manuscript is currently housed at the Bibliothèque nationale de France (Gr. 113) at Paris.

== See also ==
- List of New Testament minuscules
- Biblical manuscript
- Textual criticism
