= Minuscule 245 =

- New Testament manuscript
- Text: Gospels
- Date: 1199
- Script: Greek
- Now at: State Historical Museum
- Size: 19.5 cm by 15 cm
- Type: Byzantine text-type
- Category: V
- Note: marginalia

Minuscule 245 (in the Gregory-Aland numbering), ε 1226 (Soden), is a Greek minuscule manuscript of the New Testament, on parchment. It is dated by a colophon to the year 1199. It has marginalia.

== Description ==
The codex contains a complete text of the four Gospels on 255 parchment leaves (size 19.5 cm by 15 cm). The text is written in one column per page, 21-23 lines per page. The leaves were arranged in quarto.

The text is divided according to the Ammonian Sections whose numbers are given at the margin.

It contains the Eusebian Canon tables, tables of the κεφαλαια (tables of contents) before each Gospel; it contains lectionary markings at the margin for liturgical reading. Synaxarion and Menologion were added by a later hand.

== Text ==
The Greek text of the codex is a representative of the Byzantine text-type. Aland placed it in Category V.

Hermann von Soden lists it as I^{s} (along with codices 157, 235, 291, 713, 1012).

According to the Claremont Profile Method it has mixture of the Byzantine text-families in Luke 1. In Luke 10 and Luke 20 it represents textual cluster 1167.

== History ==
The manuscript was written by John, a priest, in 1199. Formerly the manuscript was held at the monastery Vatopedi at Athos peninsula. It was brought to Moscow, in 1655, by the monk Arsenius, on the suggestion of the Patriarch Nikon, in the reign of Alexei Mikhailovich Romanov (1645-1676). The manuscript was collated by C. F. Matthaei.

The manuscript is currently housed at the State Historical Museum (V. 16, S. 278) at Moscow.

== See also ==
- List of New Testament minuscules
- Biblical manuscript
- Textual criticism
