= Minuscule 139 =

Greek minuscule manuscript of the New Testament

- New Testament manuscript
- Text: Luke, John
- Date: 1173 ?
- Script: Greek
- Now at: Vatican Library
- Size: 37 cm by 27.5 cm
- Type: Byzantine text-type
- Category: V

Minuscule 139 (in the Gregory-Aland numbering), A^{202} (Soden), is a Greek minuscule manuscript of the New Testament, on parchment leaves. It is dated by a colophon to 1173.

== Description ==
The codex contains the text of the Gospel of Luke and Gospel of John on 233 parchment leaves (size 37 cm by 27.6 cm). The text is written in one column per page. The biblical text is surrounded by a catena.

It is believed the date 1173 was added by a later hand, though according to Gregory it is correct date.

== Text ==
The Greek text of the codex is a representative of the Byzantine text-type. Aland placed it in Category V. According to the Claremont Profile Method it represents textual cluster 291 in Luke 1. In Luke 10 and Luke 20 no profile was made.

== History ==
According to the colophon it was written in 1173, but the colophon was not written by the original scribe, only by a somewhat later hand.

The manuscript was examined by Birch (about 1782) and Scholz. C. R. Gregory saw it in 1886.

It is currently housed at the Vatican Library (Vat. gr. 758), at Rome.

== See also ==
- List of New Testament minuscules
- Biblical manuscript
- Textual criticism
