= Minuscule 449 =

- New Testament manuscript
- Text: Gospels
- Date: 13th century
- Script: Greek
- Now at: British Library
- Size: 12.8 cm by 9.1 cm
- Type: Byzantine text-type
- Category: V
- Hand: carefully written
- Note: marginalia

Minuscule 449 (in the Gregory-Aland numbering), ε 330 (in the Soden numbering), is a Greek minuscule manuscript of the New Testament, on parchment. Palaeographically it has been assigned to the 13th century.

== Description ==
The codex contains a complete text of the four Gospels in two volumes on 317 (146 + 171) parchment leaves (12.8 cm by 9.1 cm). The text is written in one column per page, in 23-24 lines per page.

The text is divided according to the κεφαλαια (chapters), whose numerals are given at the margin, and the τιτλοι (titles of chapters) at the top of the pages. There is also a division according to the smaller Ammonian Sections (in Mark 233 Sections - the last in 16:8), with references to the Eusebian Canons.

It contains prolegomena, lists of the κεφαλαια (tables of contents) before each Gospel, lectionary markings at the margin (for liturgical use), Synaxarion, Menologion, subscriptions at the end of each Gospel, and pictures. It was clearly carefully written.

== Text ==
The Greek text of the codex is a representative of the Byzantine text-type. Aland placed it in Category V. According to the Claremont Profile Method it belongs to the textual cluster 291 and creates textual pair with minuscule 2603 in Luke 1, Luke 10, and Luke 20.

== History ==
The manuscripts was written by Gerasimus, a monk. It once belonged together with the codex 44 to Caesar de Missy (1703–1775), French chaplain. It came to London in 1748. It was the last manuscript added to the list of New Testament manuscripts by Scholz (1794–1852).

It was purchased for the British Museum in 1776. Scholz examined it only in Mark 5. C. R. Gregory saw it in 1883.

It is currently housed at the British Library (Add MS 4950-4951) in London.

== See also ==
- List of New Testament minuscules
- Biblical manuscript
- Textual criticism
