= Minuscule 264 =

- New Testament manuscript
- Text: Gospels
- Date: 12th century
- Script: Greek
- Found: 1718, Paul Lucas
- Now at: National Library of France
- Size: 20.5 cm by 14.2 cm
- Type: Byzantine text-type
- Category: V
- Note: marginalia

Minuscule 264 (in the Gregory-Aland numbering), ε 284 (Soden), is a Greek minuscule manuscript of the New Testament, on parchment. Paleographically it has been assigned to the 12th century. It has marginalia.

== Description ==
The codex contains the text of the four Gospels on 294 parchment leaves (20.5 cm by 14.2 cm), with some lacunae. The text is written in one column per page, in 20 lines per page.

The text is divided according to the κεφαλαια (chapters), whose numbers are given at the margin, and the τιτλοι (titles of chapters) at the top of the pages. There is also a division according to the Ammonian Sections (in Mark 236 sections, the last section in 16:12), with references to the Eusebian Canons (written below Ammonian Section numbers).

It contains tables of the κεφαλαια (chapters) before each Gospel, synaxaria, and subscriptions at the end of each Gospel, with numbers of στιχοι.

Lacunae
Matthew 1:1-7:14; 14:31-15:24; 15:37-16:24; 17:8-18:7; Luke 18:17-30; John 5:23-36; 6:69-7:12; 21:23-25.
Mark 8:27-10:35; Luke 9:52-11:36 were added by a later hand.

== Text ==
The Greek text of the codex is a representative of the Byzantine text-type. Aland placed it in Category V. According to the Claremont Profile Method it represents textual family in Kx in Luke 1 and Luke 20. In Luke 10 it represents Πa.

In John 8:6 it contains the addition: ενος εκαστου αυτων τας αμαρτιας. This textual variant appears in some Latin manuscripts. U (030), Minuscule 73, 331, 364, 700, 782, 1592 and some Armenian manuscripts have this variant in John 8:8.

== History ==
The manuscript was brought from the East in 1718 by Paul Lucas. The manuscripts was added to the list of New Testament manuscripts by Scholz (1794-1852). It was examined and described by Paulin Martin. C. R. Gregory saw the manuscript in 1885.

The manuscript is currently housed at the Bibliothèque nationale de France (Gr. 65) at Paris.

== See also ==
- List of New Testament minuscules
- Biblical manuscript
- Textual criticism
