= Minuscule 235 =

- New Testament manuscript
- Name: Codex Havniensis 2
- Text: Gospels
- Date: 1314
- Script: Greek
- Now at: Det Kongelige Bibliotek
- Size: 21.8 cm by 15.4 cm
- Type: Byzantine text-type
- Category: V
- Note: ill divided words

Minuscule 235 (in the Gregory-Aland numbering), ε 456 (Soden), known as Codex Havniensis 2 is a Greek minuscule manuscript of the New Testament, on paper. It is dated by a colophon to the year 1314. The manuscript has complex contents. It has marginalia.

== Description ==
The codex contains a complete text of the four Gospels, on 280 paper leaves (size 21.8 cm by 15.4 cm). The text is written in one column per page, 23 lines per page (size of column 15.2 by 9.5 cm), the capital letters in red. The initials at the beginning of Matthew and Mark are the same as in Lectionary 6.

The text is divided according to the Ammonian Sections, whose numbers are given at the margin. It contains tables of the κεφαλαια (tables of contents) before each Gospel, lectionary markings at the margin, and incipits. The words are often ill divided and the stops misplaced (as in minuscule 80).

== Text ==
The Greek text of the codex is a representative of the Byzantine text-type. Aland placed it in Category V. According to the Claremont Profile Method it represents textual family K^{x} in Luke 10 and Luke 20. In Luke 1 it has mixed Byzantine text.

The text often agrees with D, K, 33, Philoxenian Syriac. Hermann von Soden lists it as I^{s} (along with codices 157, 245, 291, 713, 1012), but Soden examined it only in the Gospel of John.

== History ==
The manuscript was written by the hand of Philothens, a monk. It was bought at Venice by Friedrich Rostgaard in 1699. It was examined by C. G. Hensler (1784) and Charles Graux (1878). C. R. Gregory saw it in 1878 and in 1891.

It is currently housed at the Det Kongelige Bibliotek (GkS 1323, 4) at Copenhagen.

== See also ==
- List of New Testament minuscules
- Biblical manuscript
- Textual criticism
