= Minuscule 364 =

- New Testament manuscript
- Text: Gospels
- Date: 10th century
- Script: Greek
- Now at: Laurentian Library
- Size: 13.7 cm by 10 cm
- Type: Byzantine text-type
- Category: V
- Note: marginalia

Minuscule 364 (in the Gregory-Aland numbering), ε 1011 (Soden), is a Greek minuscule manuscript of the New Testament, on parchment. Palaeographically it has been assigned to the 10th century. It has marginalia.

== Description ==
The codex contains a complete text of the four Gospels on 284 parchment leaves (13.7 cm by 10 cm) with catena. It is written in one column per page, in 20 lines per page. The style of characters rather peculiar, without the usual breaks between the Gospels. The style of the characters resembles Slavonic.

The original text of the manuscript was not divided. It was divided by a later hand according to the κεφαλαια (chapters), whose numbers are given at the margin, and their τιτλοι (titles of chapters). There is also a division according to the smaller Ammonian Sections, with references to the Eusebian Canons (only in Matthew). This division also was added by later hand.

It contains Synaxarion and Menologion that were added in the 15th century. Text of Matthew 1:1-13 was added in the 15th century.

== Text ==
The Greek text of the codex is a representative of the Byzantine text-type. Hermann von Soden classified it to the textual family K^{x}. Aland placed it in Category V. According to the Claremont Profile Method it represents the textual family K^{x} in Luke 1, Luke 10, and Luke 20, and belongs to the textual cluster Ω.

In John 8:8 the codex has unique textual addition: ενος εκαστου αυτων τας αμαρτιας (sins of every one of them). This textual variant have Codex Nanianus, 73, 331, 413, 658, 700, 782, 1592 and some Armenian manuscripts. 652 has this variant on the margin added by a later hand. Minuscule 264 has this textual variant in John 8:6.

== History ==
The manuscript was added to the list of New Testament manuscripts by Scholz (1794–1852). It was examined by Burgon. C. R. Gregory saw it in 1886.

The manuscript is currently housed at the Biblioteca Laurentiana (Plutei VI. 24) in Florence.

== See also ==
- List of New Testament minuscules
- Biblical manuscript
- Textual criticism
