= Minuscule 713 =

- New Testament manuscript
- Name: Codex Algerina Peckower 2
- Text: Gospels
- Date: 12th century
- Script: Greek
- Found: 1876
- Now at: University of Birmingham
- Size: 19.4 cm by 15.7 cm
- Type: mixed
- Category: none
- Note: –

Minuscule 713 (in the Gregory-Aland numbering), ε351 (von Soden), is a Greek minuscule manuscript of the New Testament, on parchment. Palaeographically it has been assigned to the 12th century. The manuscript is lacunose. Frederick Henry Ambrose Scrivener labelled it as 561^{e}.

== Description ==
The codex contains the text of the four Gospels, on 363 parchment leaves (size 19.4 cm by 15.7 cm), with some lacunae. It lacks texts of John 10:27–11:14; 11:29–42.

The 17th leaf is written in uncial script.

The text is written in one column per page, 16-17 lines per page. The leaves are arranged in quarto.

The manuscript contains lists of the κεφαλαια (lists of contents) before each Gospel. The text is divided according to the κεφαλαια (chapters), whose numbers are given at the left margin of the text and their τιτλοι (titles) are given at the top. The text is divided according to the Ammonian Sections, which numbers are given at the margin, with a references to the Eusebian Canons. It contains lectionary markings, incipits, Synaxarion, Menologion, subscriptions, and pictures.

It is a palimpsest, folios from 2 verso to 364 recto contain the upper text of 713, folios 1–3.352-365 contain the older text of lectionary designated by 586 (Gregory-Aland).

== Text ==
Kurt Aland did not place the Greek text of the codex in any Category.

J. Rendel Harris recognised textual similarities to minuscule 13. Scrivener described it is one of the Ferrar Family, but it was not confirmed by more recent examinations.

Hermann von Soden lists it as I^{s} (along with codices 157, 235, 245, 291, 1012).

According to the Claremont Profile Method it represents mixed text in Luke 1 and Luke 20. In Luke 10 it has Byzantine mixed text.

In Matthew 17:26 it has additional reading εφη Σιμων ναι λεγει ο Ιησους δος ουν και συ ως αλλοτριος αυτων; this reading can be found in Ephraem.

== History ==
Scrivener and Gregory dated the manuscript to the 11th or 12th century. The manuscript is dated by the Institute for New Testament Textual Research to the 12th century.

The manuscript used to be held in Athens. It was bought in 1876 from Bernard Quaritch. It is currently housed in the Cadbury Research Library, University of Birmingham (Peckover Gr. 7).

It was added to the list of New Testament manuscripts by Scrivener (561) and Gregory (713). Gregory saw the manuscript in 1883. It was partially collated by J. Rendel Harris in Matthew.

== See also ==
- List of New Testament minuscules
- Biblical manuscript
- Textual criticism
