= Minuscule 418 =

- New Testament manuscript
- Text: Matthew, Mark †
- Date: 14th century
- Script: Greek
- Now at: Biblioteca Marciana
- Size: 21.4 cm by 15.8 cm
- Type: Byzantine text-type
- Category: V
- Note: full marginalia

Minuscule 418 (in the Gregory-Aland numbering), ε 504 (in the Soden numbering), is a Greek minuscule manuscript of the New Testament, on paper. Palaeographically it has been assigned to the 14th century. It has marginalia.

== Description ==
The codex contains the text of the Gospel of Matthew and Gospel of Mark on 120 paper leaves (21.4 cm by 15.8 cm) with lacunae. The text is written in two columns per page, in 17-20 lines per page. It has many errors of itacism.

The text is divided according to the κεφαλαια (chapters), whose numbers are given at the margin, and their τιτλοι (titles) at the top of the pages. There is also a division according to the smaller Ammonian Sections (no references to the Eusebian Canons).

It contains tables of the κεφαλαια (tables of contents) before each Gospel, lectionary equipment at the margin, and many red crosses for stops.

Contents: Matthew and Mark 1:1-13:32. Probably the manuscript was never finished.

== Text ==
The Greek text of the codex is a representative of the Byzantine text-type. Aland placed it in Category V.

In Matthew 6:13 it has doxology in the Lord's Prayer in this version:

ὅτι σοῦ ἐστιν ἡ βασιλεία καὶ ἡ δύναμις καὶ ἡ δόξα, τοῦ πατρὸς καὶ τοῦ υἱοῦ καὶ τοῦ ἁγίου πνεύματος εἰς τοὺς αἰῶνας. ἀμήν (For thine is the kingdom and the power and the glory, of the Father and of the Son and of the Holy Spirit for ever. Amen.)

This ending appears in only two other manuscripts: 157 and 225.

== History ==
The manuscript was added to the list of New Testament manuscripts by Scholz (1794-1852). C. R. Gregory saw it in 1886.

The manuscript is currently housed at the Biblioteca Marciana (Gr. I. 28) in Venice.

== See also ==
- List of New Testament minuscules
- Biblical manuscript
- Textual criticism
