= Victor Gardthausen =

Victor Emil Gardthausen (26 August 1843 – 27 December 1925) was a German ancient historian, palaeographer, librarian, and professor from Leipzig University. He was author and co-author of books, editor of ancient texts.

== Life ==
Gardthausen was born on 26 August 1843 at Copenhagen.

Between 1865 and 1869 Gardthausen studied philology in Kiel and Bonn. In Kiel Alfred von Gutschmid was his professor. After the Franco-Prussian War he was sent to Italy and Greece for palaeographical research. In 1873 he started work at the Leipziger Stadtbibliothek and from 1875 at the Leipzig University Library. From 1877 he was an extraordinary professor for ancient history. In 1887/1888 he was active again as a university librarian, becoming the main librarian in 1901. In 1907 he left the library service.

Gardthausen died on 27 December 1925 in Leipzig.

He examined Codex Sinaiticus, Codex Boernerianus, Uspenski Gospels, manuscripts housed in the monastery at Sinai among many others. According to him, the Codex Sinaiticus was written in Alexandria and is younger than the Codex Vaticanus by at least fifty years. According to him, the Uspenski Gospels were seen by Johann Martin Augustin Scholz when he visited Mar Saba. Gardthausen dated Codex Boernerianus to the years 850–900 A.D. The evidence for this date range includes the style of the script, the smaller uncial letters in Greek, the Latin interlinear written in Anglo-Saxon minuscule and the separation of words. He investigated the nomina sacra. Gardthausen stated: Ist die Handschrift gefunden, so orientiert man durch eine detaillierte Beschreibung, die im Verlaufe der Arbeit durch Beispiele vervollständigt wird ("Any intensive study of a manuscript begins with a detailed description, which in the course of its study is completed through illustration"). Gardthausen's main work is Griechische Paläographie (Greek palaeography); the first edition appeared in 1879, the second in 1911/1913. It was the most important work since the time of Bernard de Montfaucon. It remains a standard work.

== Works ==
- Die geographischen Quellen Ammians Probevortrag; Montag den 20. Januar 1873, Leipzig, 1873.
- Ammianus Marcellinus (1874), Gardthausen, V. (ed.), Ammiani Marcellini Rerum Gestarum Libri Qui Supersunt (in Latin), vol. Prius, B.G. Teubneri
- Mastara oder Servius Tullius: Mit einer Einleitung über die Ausdehnung des Etruskerreiches, Leipzig, 1882.
- Augustus und seine zeit, 2 vol., Leipzig, 1861–1904.
- Catalogus codicum Graecorum Sinaiticorum. Oxford. 1886.
- Sammlungen und Cataloge griechischer Handschriften, Leipzig, 1903.
- Der Altar des Kaiserfriedens, Ara Pacis Augustae, Leipzig, 1908.
- M. Vogel − V. Gardthausen, Die griechischen Schreiber des Mittelalters und der Renaissance, Leipzig, 1909.
- Amtliche Zitate in römischen Urkunden, Berlijn – e.a., 1910.
- Griechische Paleographie, 1 vol., 2 vol., Leipzig, 1911–1913.
- Die Schrift, Unterschriften, und chronologie im Altertum und im byzantinischen Mittelalter, Leipzig, 1913.
- Handbuch der wissenschaftlichen Bibliothekskunde, 2 vol., Leipzig, 1920.
- Die Alexandrinische Bibliothek, ihr Vorbild, Katalog und Betrieb, Leipzig, 1922.
- Das alte Monogramm, Leipzig, 1924.
- Autobiographie, [Leipzig, 1926].
