= Minuscule 162 =

- New Testament manuscript
- Name: Codex Barberinianus 11
- Text: Gospels
- Date: 1153
- Script: Greek
- Now at: Vatican Library
- Size: 23.4 cm by 17 cm
- Type: Byzantine text-type
- Category: V
- Note: remarkable reading in Luke 11:2 marginalia

Minuscule 162 (in the Gregory-Aland numbering), ε 214 (Soden), is a Greek minuscule manuscript of the New Testament, on parchment. It is dated by a colophon to the year 1153. It has marginalia.

== Description ==
The codex contains a complete text of the four Gospels on 248 parchment leaves (size 23.4 cm by 17 cm). The text is written in one column per page, in 23 lines per page, in black ink, the capital letters in red.

The text is divided according to the κεφαλαια (chapters), whose numbers are given at the margin, and the τιτλοι (titles of chapters) at the top of the pages. There is also a division according to the smaller Ammonian Sections (in Mark 240, the last section in 16:19), (no references to the Eusebian Canons).

It contains the Epistula ad Carpianum, the Eusebian Canon tables at the beginning, pictures, and subscriptions at the end of each Gospel.

== Text ==
The Greek text of the codex is a representative of the Byzantine text-type. Hermann von Soden classified it to the textual family I (established by Pamphilus in Caesarea about 300 A.D.). Aland placed it in Category V. According to the Claremont Profile Method it represents textual family K^{x} in Luke 1 and Luke 20. In Luke 10 it has mixture of the Byzantine families.

In the Lord's Prayer in Luke 11:2 it contains the very same remarkable reading as minuscule 700: ἐλθέτω σου τὸ πνεῦμά τὸ ἅγιον καὶ καθαρισάτω ἡμᾶς ("May your Holy Spirit come and cleanse us"), instead of "May your Kingdom come".

== History ==
According to the colophon it was written 13 May 1153 by Presbyter Manuel.

It was slightly examined by Birch (about 1782) and Scholz (1794–1852). C. R. Gregory saw it in 1886.

It is currently housed at the Vatican Library (Barb. gr. 449), at Rome.

== See also ==
- List of New Testament minuscules
- Biblical manuscript
- Textual criticism
