= Minuscule 654 =

- New Testament manuscript
- Text: Gospels †
- Date: 12th century
- Script: Greek
- Now at: Jagiellonian Library
- Size: 11.8 cm by 9 cm
- Type: ?
- Category: none

Minuscule 654 (in the Gregory-Aland numbering), ε 1217 (von Soden), is a Greek minuscule manuscript of the New Testament, on parchment. Palaeographically it has been assigned to the 12th century. The manuscript is lacunose. Scrivener labelled it by 641^{e}.

== Description ==
The codex contains the text of the four Gospels, on 179 parchment leaves (size 11.8 cm by 9 cm) with some lacunae (Matthew 1:1-20; 3:12-4:15; Mark 16:1-20; John 19:3-21:25).

The text is written in one column per page, 25 (and more) lines per page. The text is divided according to the numbered κεφαλαια (chapters) with their τιτλοι (titles) at the top.

== Text ==
Kurt Aland did not place the Greek text of the codex in any Category. The manuscript was not examined by using the Claremont Profile Method. As a result, its textual character is still unknown.

== History ==
Scrivener dated the manuscript to the 11th or 12th century, Gregory dated it to the 12th century. Currently the manuscript is dated by the INTF to the 12th century.

The manuscript was brought from Sinai to Berlin by Heinrich Brugsch (along with the codex 653). Wilhelm Wattenbach published a facsimile of one pager of the codex in 1876. Gregory saw the manuscript in 1887. It was housed in Berlin in the Preußische Königliche Bibliothek (actual name Berlin State Library) with the shelf-number Gr. Octavo 4.

At the end of 1943 year has increased the frequency of the bombing of Berlin. The Prussian State Library sent many collections out of Berlin to be sheltered in Silesia for safekeeping. As the result of postwar border changes some of these collections were found in Poland (among them minuscule 654). They were moved to the Jagiellonian University Library.

Currently the manuscript is housed at the Biblioteka Jagiellońska (Fonds der Berliner Handschriften, Graec. Octavo 4), in Kraków.

== See also ==
- List of New Testament minuscules
- Biblical manuscript
- Textual criticism
- Minuscule 653
