= Minuscule 653 =

- New Testament manuscript
- Text: Gospel of Matthew, Gospel of John
- Date: 1077
- Script: Greek
- Now at: Jagiellonian Library, National Library of Russia
- Size: 13.7 cm by 9.8 cm
- Type: ?
- Category: none

Minuscule 653 (in the Gregory-Aland numbering), ε 182 (von Soden), is a Greek minuscule manuscript of the New Testament, on parchment. It is dated by a colophon to the year 1077. The manuscript has not complex contents. Scrivener labelled it by 640^{e}.

== Description ==
The codex contains the text of the Gospel of Matthew and Gospel of John, on 267 parchment leaves (size 13.7 cm by 9.8 cm). The text is written in one column per page, 16 lines per page.

The text is divided according to the κεφαλαια (chapters), whose numbers are given at the margin, and their τιτλοι (titles) at the top of the pages. There is also another division according to the smaller Ammonian Sections, whose numbers are given at the margin, with a references to the Eusebian Canons.

It contains the tables of the κεφαλαια before each Gospel, lectionary markings, music notes (in red), subscriptions, and numbered στιχοι.

== Text ==
Kurt Aland did not place the Greek text of the codex it in any Category.

== History ==
The manuscript was written by Markus, a scribe. It was brought from Sinai to Berlin by Heinrich Brugsch along with the codex 654 and Minuscule 658. Gregory saw the manuscript in 1887. It was housed in Berlin (Konig. Bibl. Gr. Oktavo 3). One leaf of the codex was brought to Petersburg in 1912. Kurt Treu examined one leaf of the codex (housed in Petersburg).

At the end of 1943 year has increased the frequency of the bombing of Berlin. The Prussian State Library sent many collections out of Berlin to be sheltered in Silesia for safekeeping. As the result of postwar border changes some of these collections were found in Poland (among them 266 folios of minuscule 653). They were moved to the Jagiellonian University Library.

Actually 266 folios of the manuscript are housed at the Biblioteka Jagiellońska (Fonds der Berliner Hss., Graec. Octavo 3), in Kraków. One folio of the codex is housed at the National Library of Russia (Gr. 292) in Saint Petersburg.

== See also ==
- List of New Testament minuscules
- Biblical manuscript
- Textual criticism
- Minuscule 654
