= Theodor Brugsch =

German internist and politician (1878–1963)

Personal details
- Born: 11 October 1878 Graz, Duchy of Styria, Austria-Hungary
- Died: 11 July 1963 (aged 84) East Berlin, East Germany
- Parent: Heinrich Karl Brugsch

Theodor Brugsch (11 October 1878 – 11 July 1963) was a German internist and politician.

== Early life ==
Theodor Brugsch was born in Graz to Heinrich Karl Brugsch, was a well-known German Egyptologist. Brugsch received his schooling in Berlin and would continue to live there for most of his life.

== Career ==
He became an associate professor in 1910, and practiced medicine at the Charité Hospital in Berlin prior to and after World War I. In 1917–19 he served with distinction as a physician with the 9th Army in Romania.

From 1927 to 1935 he was a professor at the University of Halle. In 1935 Brugsch resigned from the university due to the political climate in 1930s Germany, subsequently opening a private practice in Berlin. Brugsch seems to have been a member of the Nazi party in 1930 and during 1937–1945 but eventually had been cleared by a denazification tribunal. After World War II, he returned to the Charité, which was now in East Berlin, and where he stayed for the remainder of his career. Brugsch died in Berlin.

With Friedrich Kraus, he published a 19-volume medical textbook titled Spezielle Pathologie und Therapie (1919–29), and with Friedrich H. Lewy, he published Die Biologie der Person (1926–30). He was the 1954 recipient of the Goethe Prize, and in 1978 was depicted on a 25-pfennig postage stamp issued by the East German government.

In addition to his medical work, in 1945–46 he took a political position with the embryonic East German state as departmental chief of the German Peoples' Education Administration (Deutsche Verwaltung für Volksbildung).

He subsequently received various honours from the state: in 1949 he was named as an Honoured Doctor of the People (Verdienter Arzt des Volkes) and in 1953 as an Outstanding scientist of the people (Hervorragender Wissenschaftler des Volkes), and he received the silver Patriotic Order of Merit in 1954 followed by the gold version in 1958, In 1956 the state also honoured him with the National Prize of East Germany.

After retiring in 1957, he was appointed vice-president of the nation's Cultural Association (KB / Deutsche Kulturbund).

== Associated eponym ==
- "Brugsch's syndrome": a multi-symptom disorder that is similar to Touraine-Solente-Golé syndrome without acromegaly.

== Selected written works ==
- Lehrbuch klinischer Untersuchungsmethoden, (with Alfred Schittenhelm) Berlin and Vienna, 1908; sixth edition, (1923).
- Der Nukleinstoffwechsel und seine Störungen, Jena, (1910).
- Diätetik innerer Erkrankungen Berlin, 1911; second edition, 1919 as: Lehrbuch der Diätetik des Gesunden und Kranken.
- Technik der speziellen klinischen Untersuchungsmethoden, (with Alfred Schittenhelm) Berlin and Vienna, 1914; 2nd edition 1923-1929 as: Klinische Laboratoriumstechnik.
- Allgemeine Prognostik, Berlin and Vienna, 1918; second edition, (1922).
- Lehrbuch der Herz- und Gafässerkrankungen, Berlin, (1929).
- Lehrbuch der inneren Medizin, two volumes; Berlin and Vienna, (1931).
- Arzt seit fünf Jahrzehnten several editions, (1953–1959).
