= Minuscule 73 =

- New Testament manuscript
- Text: Gospels
- Date: 12th century
- Script: Greek
- Now at: Christ Church, Oxford
- Size: 25.1 cm by 20.7 cm
- Type: Byzantine text-type
- Category: V
- Note: full marginalia

Minuscule 73 (in the Gregory-Aland numbering), ε 260 (von Soden), is a Greek minuscule manuscript of the New Testament, on parchment leaves. Palaeographically it has been assigned to the 12th century. The manuscript has complex contents with full marginalia.

== Description ==
The codex contains complete text of the four Gospels on 291 leaves (size 25.1 cm by 20.7 cm). The text is written in one column per page, 21 lines per page.

The text is divided according to the κεφαλαια (chapters), whose numbers are given at the margin, and their τιτλοι (titles) at the top of the pages, but this system is not complete. There is also another division according to the smaller Ammonian Sections (Matthew 341, Mark not complete, Luke 349, John 229 – 21:17), with references to the Eusebian Canons (written below Ammonian Section numbers).

It contains the Eusebian tables, the tables of the κεφαλαια (tables of contents) are placed before every Gospel, few lectionary markings at the margin (for liturgical use), and pictures.

== Text ==
The Greek text of the codex is a representative of the Byzantine text-type. Hermann von Soden classified it to the textual family K^{x}. Aland placed it in Category V. According to the Claremont Profile Method it represents K^{x} in Luke 10 and Luke 20. In Luke 1 it has mixed text.

In John 8:8 the codex has unique textual addition: ενος εκαστου αυτων τας αμαρτιας (sins of every one of them). This textual variant have Codex Nanianus, 95, 331, 364, 413, 658, 700, 782, 1592 and some Armenian manuscripts. 652 has this variant on the margin added by a later hand. Minuscule 264 has this textual variant in John 8:6.

== History ==
It is marked Ex dono Mauri Cordati Principis Hungaro-Walachiae, Anno 1724.

The manuscript came from Constantinople to England about 1724 and belonged to archbishop of Canterbury, William Wake (1657–1737), along with minuscule manuscripts 74, 506-520. Wake presented it to Christ Church, Oxford. In 1732 John Walker slightly collated it for Bentley. It was examined by G. W. Kitchin. C. R. Gregory saw it in 1883.

It is currently housed in at Christ Church, Oxford (Wake 26), at Oxford.

== See also ==
- List of New Testament minuscules
- Biblical manuscript
- Textual criticism
