= Lectionary 233 =

Lectionary ℓ 233
- New Testament manuscript
- Text: Evangelistarium †
- Date: 11th century
- Script: Greek
- Now at: British Library
- Size: 37.5 cm by 29.2 cm

Lectionary 233, designated by siglum ℓ 233 (in the Gregory-Aland numbering) is a Greek manuscript of the New Testament, on parchment. Palaeographically it has been assigned to the 11th century. Scrivener labelled it by 235^{evl}. Some leaves of the codex were lost.

== Description ==
The codex contains lessons from the Gospels of John, Matthew, Luke lectionary (Evangelistarium), on 188 parchment leaves (37.5 cm by 29.2 cm), with some lacunae. In some parts it is written in gold, Scrivener stated: "perhaps by the Emperor Alexius Commenus (1081-1118)".

The text is written in Greek minuscule letters, in cruciform, 25 lines per page.

There are weekday Gospel lessons.

== History ==
Scrivener and Gregory dated the manuscript to the 11th century. It is presently assigned by the INTF to the 11th century.

The manuscript was held in the Pantokratoros monastery at Athos, and then in Xenophontos monastery. It was brought by Curzon to England in 1837.

The manuscript was added to the list of New Testament manuscripts by Scrivener (number 235) and Gregory (number 233). Gregory saw it in 1883.

The manuscript is not cited in the critical editions of the Greek New Testament (UBS3).

Currently the codex is housed at the British Library (Add. 39603) in London.

== See also ==
- List of New Testament lectionaries
- Biblical manuscript
- Textual criticism

== Bibliography ==
- Gregory, Caspar René (1900). Textkritik des Neuen Testaments. Vol. 1. Leipzig. p. 406.
