= Uncial 047 =

- New Testament manuscript
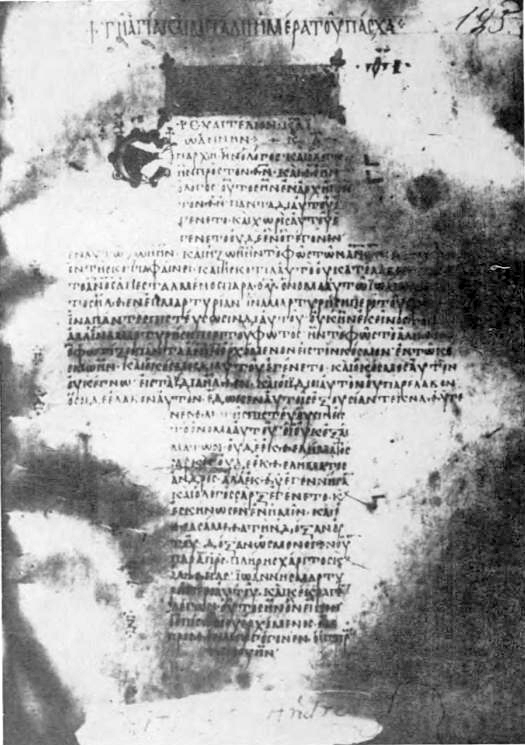
- Text: Gospels †
- Date: 8th century
- Script: Greek
- Found: Athos
- Now at: Princeton University Library
- Size: 20,5 x 15,2 cm
- Type: Byzantine text-type
- Category: V
- Note: cruciform

Uncial 047 is a Greek uncial manuscript of the New Testament Gospels, written on vellum. It is designated by the siglum 047 in the Gregory-Aland numbering of New Testament manuscripts, and ε 95 in the von Soden numbering of New Testament manuscripts. It was formerly designated by Hebrew letter ב.

Using the study of comparative handwriting styles (palaeography), it has been assigned to the 8th century. It has full marginal notes.

== Description ==
The manuscript is a codex (precursor to the modern book format), containing a near complete text of the four Gospels on 152 parchment leaves (sized 20.5 cm by 15.2 cm), with some gaps in Matthew, Mark, and John. The text is written partly in columns and partly in cruciform, with 37 or 38 lines per page. The parchment is thick, the ink used is brown, and the letters are small.

The text is divided according to the chapters (known as κεφαλαια / kephalaia), whose numbers are given in the margin, and their titles (known as τιτλοι / titloi) written at the top of the pages. There is also a division according to the Ammonian Sections in the Gospels (237 in Mark, ending at Mark 16:15), with references to the Eusebian Canons written underneath the Ammonian sections (both early divisions of the Gospels into sections).

It contains prolegomena (introductions), tables of contents (also known as κεφαλαια) before each Gospel, and lectionary notes in the margin (for liturgical use).

It does not contain the text of Matthew 16:2b–3. The text of John 5:3.4 is present, but they are marked by an obelus in the left-hand margin, indicating that the passage is doubtful. The text of John 7:53-8:11 (known as the pericope adulterae) is present, and not marked by an obelus or asterisk. It uses the form ειπαν (for 3 person and plural in aoristus), typical of Koine Greek, instead of ειπον, typical of Byzantine Greek.

Missing verses

- Matthew 2:5-3:11; 28:10-20
- Mark 5:41-6:17; 8:36-9:18
- John 12:18-41; 14:8-15:1; 18:34-21:25.

== Text ==
The Greek text is considered to be a representative of the Byzantine text-type. Biblical scholar Kurt Aland gave it the following textual profile: 175^{1}, 96^{1/2}, 6^{2}, 21^{s}, and placed it in Category V of his New Testament manuscript classification system. Category V manuscripts are described as "manuscripts with a purely or predominantly Byzantine text."

Scholar Frederik Wisse grouped it under the textual family K^{x} based on an analysis of Luke chapters 1, 10, and 20. Textual critic Hermann von Soden did not classify it in this group.

== History ==
The earliest history of the manuscript is unknown. It was formerly held in the monastery of St. Andrew on Athos Peninsula, where scholar Caspar René Gregory discovered it in 1886, and provided the first description of it.

It was brought by Thomas Whittemore to the United States after being purchased by athlete, investment banker and philanthropist Robert Garrett. It was donated by Garrett in 1942 to the Princeton University Library (Library Μed. and Ren. shell number Mss, Garrett 1), in Princeton, New Jersey.

Gregory dated the manuscript to the 9th or 10th century. It is currently dated by the INTF to the 8th century.

== See also ==
- List of New Testament uncials
- Textual criticism
- Lectionary 233
