= Heinrich Karl Brugsch =

German Egyptologist (1827–1894)

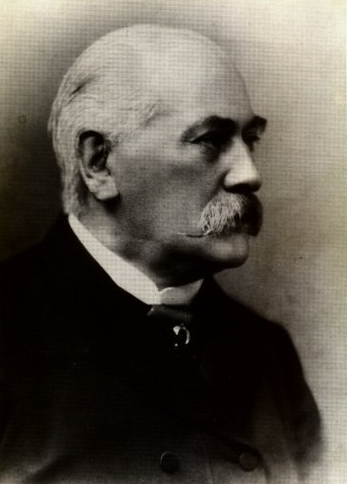
- Photograph taken c. 1894
- Born: 18 February 1827; Berlin
- Died: 9 September 1894 (aged 67); Charlottenburg
- Children: Theodor Brugsch

Heinrich Karl Brugsch (18 February 1827 – 9 September 1894) was a German Egyptologist. He was associated with Auguste Mariette in his excavations at Memphis, Egypt. He became director of the School of Egyptology at Cairo, producing numerous works and pioneering the decipherment of Demotic—the simplified script of the later Egyptian periods.

== Biography ==
Heinrich Karl Brugsch was born in Berlin in 1827. He was the son of a Prussian cavalry officer, and was born in the barracks at Berlin. He early manifested a great inclination to Egyptian studies, in which he was almost entirely self-taught. At the age of 16, he applied himself with success to the decipherment of Demotic, which had been neglected since the death of Champollion in 1832. Brugsch's work, Scriptura Ægyptiorum Demotica (Berlin, 1848), containing the results of his studies, appeared while he was a student at the gymnasium. It was followed by his Numerorum Demoticorum Doctrina (1849), and his Sammlung demotischer Urkunden (1850).

His 1848 work brought him to the attention of Alexander von Humboldt and Prussian King Frederick William IV. After completing his university course, support from the king enabled him to complete his studies with visits to foreign museums at Paris, London, Turin, and Leyden. In 1853, he was sent to Egypt by the Prussian government in 1853, and contracted an intimate friendship with Mariette, whom he assisted in his work. After this he returned to Berlin, where, in 1854, he was appointed privatdocent in the university, and, in 1855, assistant in the Egyptian Museum of Berlin. He visited Egypt again in 1857.

In 1860 he was sent to Persia on a special mission under Baron Minutoli, travelled over the country, and after Minutoli's death discharged the functions of ambassador. In 1863, he founded the Egyptological journal, Zeitschrift für Aegyptische Sprache. In 1864 he was consul at Cairo, in 1868 professor at Göttingen, and in 1870 director of the school of Egyptology, founded at Cairo by the khedive. He was soon raised to the rank of bey (1873); from this post, he was unceremoniously dismissed in 1879 by the European controllers of the public revenues, determined to economize at all hazards; and French influence prevented his succeeding his friend Mariette at the Bulaq Museum in 1883. He had been made a pasha by the khedive in 1881.

He afterwards resided principally in Germany until his death in 1894, but frequently visited Egypt, took part in two more official missions to Persia in 1883 (with Prince Frederick Charles) and 1885. He organized an Egyptian exhibit at the Philadelphia Exposition in 1876. He was elected to the American Philosophical Society in 1869.

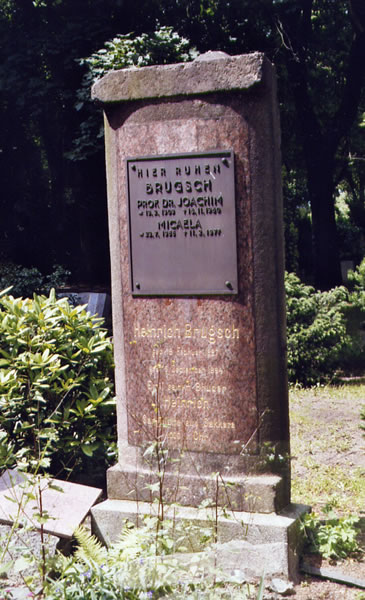
The tomb stone of Heinrich Karl Brugsch

He published his autobiography in 1894, concluding with a warm panegyric upon British rule in Egypt. Brugsch's services to Egyptology are most important, particularly in the decipherment of Demotic and the making of a vast Hieroglyphic-Demotic dictionary (1867–1882).

He was buried in Berlin-Charlottenburg. His tombstone is a reused lid of an Egyptian sarcophagus of the Old Kingdom.

Brugsch brought some biblical manuscripts from Sinai to Berlin (Minuscule 257, Minuscule 653 and Minuscule 654).

The Brugsch Papyrus, also known as the Greater Berlin Papyrus, in the Berlin Museum (Pap. Berl. 3038), an important ancient Egyptian medical papyrus, bears the name of Heinrich Karl Brugsch. It was studied originally by him.

Brugsch has been described in the context of the Curse of the pharaohs, as was his brother, through his delusional belief he held the post of Lepsius at the University of Berlin while the latter was still alive and though he had never been offered the position.

He was the brother of Egyptologist Émile Brugsch who was responsible for the poorly documented evacuation of the royal mummies at Deir el-Bahari.

== Works ==
Among the most important of his works besides those mentioned are:

- Reiseberichte aus Ägypten (Travel Diary of Egypt) (1855)
- Grammaire démotique (Demotic Grammar) (Paris, 1855)
- Monuments de l'Egypte (Monuments of Egypt) (1857)
- Geographische Inschriften (Leipzig, 1857–60)
- Histoire d'Egypte (History of Egypt) (Leipzig, 1859)
- Recueil des monuments égyptiens (Anthology of Egyptian Monuments) (Leipzig, 1862–63)
- Reise der königlich Preussischer Gesandtschaft nach Persien (Journey of the Royal Prussian Embassy to Persia) (1862–63)
- Hieroglyphisch-demotisches Wörterbuch (Hieroglyphic-Demotic Dictionary) (Leipzig, 1867–82)
- Hieroglyphische Grammatik (Hieroglyphic Grammar) (Leipzig, 1872)
- L'Exode et les monuments égyptiens (The Exodus and the Egyptian Monuments) (Leipzig, 1875)
- Dictionnaire géographique de l' ancienne Egypte (Geographical Dictionary of Ancient Egypt) (Leipzig, 1877–81)
- Geschichte Aegyptens (Leipzig, 1877; English trans. "History of Egypt from the Monuments")
- Dictionnaire géographique de l'ancienne Egypte (Leipzig, 1877–81)
- Thesaurus Inscriptionum Ægyptiacarum (Thesaurus of Egyptian Inscriptions) (Leipzig, 1883-91)
- Religion und Mythologie der Aegypter (Religion and Mythology of the Egyptians) (Leipzig, 1887)
- Die Ägyptologie (Egyptology) (1890)
- Aus dem Morgenlande, Altes und Neues (From the Orient, Old and New) (1893)
- Mein Leben und Wandern (My Life and Travels), an autobiography (1894)

== See also ==
- Brugsch Papyrus
- Theodor Brugsch
