= Minuscule 331 =

- New Testament manuscript
- Text: Gospels
- Date: 11th century
- Script: Greek
- Now at: Bibliothèque Nationale de France
- Size: 24 cm by 18 cm
- Type: Byzantine text-type
- Category: V
- Note: marginalia

Minuscule 331 (in the Gregory-Aland numbering), ε 1085 (Soden), is a Greek minuscule manuscript of the New Testament, on parchment. Palaeographically it has been assigned to the 11th century. According to Gregory the 10th century is also possible. It has marginalia.

== Description ==
The codex contains the text of the four Gospels on 275 parchment leaves (24 cm by 18 cm) with some lacunae. The text is written in one column per page, in 20 lines per page.

The text is divided according to the κεφαλαια (chapters), whose numbers are given at the margin, and their τιτλοι (titles of chapters) at the top of the pages. There is also a division according to the smaller Ammonian Sections (in Mark 235 Sections, last in 16:12), with references to the Eusebian Canons.

It contains the Epistula ad Carpianum, Eusebian Canon tables at the beginning, Prolegomena, lists of the κεφαλαια (tables of contents) before each Gospel, and lectionary markings at the margin (for liturgical use).

== Text ==
The Greek text of the codex is a representative of the Byzantine text-type. Aland placed it in Category V.

According to the Claremont Profile Method it represents textual cluster 585 in Luke 1, Luke 10, and Luke 20 (weak member in Luke 10 and Luke 20).

In John 8:8 the codex has the textual addition: ενος εκαστου αυτων τας αμαρτιας (sins of every one of them). This textual variant appears in Codex Nanianus, 73, 364, 413, 700, 782, 1592 and some Armenian manuscripts. 652 has this variant on the margin added by a later hand. Minuscule 264 has this textual variant in John 8:6.

== History ==
The manuscript once belonged to Hector D'Ailli's, Bishop of Toulle. In 1530 it was presented to the Tuller's Library. Bernard de Montfaucon described the manuscript as the first. It was added to the list of New Testament manuscripts by Scholz (1794-1852). It was examined by Paulin Martin, who gave a new description of the codex. C. R. Gregory saw it in 1885.

The manuscript became a part of the Fonds Coislin (Gr. 197). The manuscript is currently housed at the Bibliothèque Nationale de France (Coislin, Gr. 197) at Paris.

== See also ==
- List of New Testament minuscules
- Biblical manuscript
- Textual criticism
