= Uncial 0211 =

- New Testament manuscript
- Text: Gospels
- Date: 7th century
- Script: Greek
- Now at: Georgian National Center of Manuscripts
- Size: 27 x 19.5 cm
- Type: Byzantine text-type
- Category: V

Uncial 0211 (in the Gregory-Aland numbering), ε 051 (Soden), is a Greek uncial manuscript of the New Testament, dated paleographically to the 7th century.

== Description ==
The codex contains a complete text of the four Gospels, on 258 parchment leaves (27 cm by 19.5 cm). Written in two columns per page, 8 lines per page, in uncial letters.

The text-type of this codex is a representative of the Byzantine text-type. Hermann von Soden classified it to the K^{1}. Aland placed it in Category V.

According to the Claremont Profile Method it represents the textual family K^{x} in Luke 1, in Luke 10 it has a mixture of the Byzantine families, in Luke 20 it has mixed text. In Luke 1 it belongs to the textual cluster 1213; it is related to the Codex Campianus in Luke 10 and Luke 20.

Currently it is dated by the INTF to the 9th century.

The manuscript was added to the list of the New Testament manuscripts by Kurt Aland in 1953.

The codex is currently housed at the Georgian National Center of Manuscripts (Gr. 27) in Tbilisi, Georgia.

== See also ==
- List of New Testament uncials
- Textual criticism
