= Minuscule 782 =

- New Testament manuscript
- Text: Gospels
- Date: 12th century
- Script: Greek
- Now at: National Library of Greece
- Size: 23.5 cm by 18.5 cm
- Type: Byzantine text-type
- Category: V
- Note: –

Minuscule 782 (in the Gregory-Aland numbering), ε466 (von Soden), is a Greek minuscule manuscript of the New Testament written on parchment. Palaeographically it has been assigned to the 12th century. The manuscript has complex contents.

== Description ==
The codex contains the text of the four Gospels, on 277 parchment leaves (size 23.5 cm by 18.5 cm). The text is written in one column per page, 22 lines per page.

The text is divided according to the κεφαλαια (chapters), whose numbers are given at the margin, with their τιτλοι (titles) at the top of the pages. There is also another division according to the smaller Ammonian Sections (in Mark 233 Sections, last in 16:8), without references to the Eusebian Canons.

It contains tables of the κεφαλαια before each Gospel, lectionary markings at the margin (later hand), liturgical books (Synaxarion and Menologion).

== Text ==
The Greek text of the codex is a representative of the Byzantine text-type. Hermann von Soden classified it to the textual family K^{x}. Aland placed it in Category V.

According to the Claremont Profile Method it represents the textual cluster 1001 in Luke 1, Luke 10, and Luke 20.

In John 8:8 it has reading ἔγραφεν εἰς τὴν γῆν ἕνος ἑκάστου αὐτῶν τὰς ἁμαρτίας (wrote on the ground the sins of every one of them). The reading is supported by the manuscripts: Codex Nanianus, 73, 331, 364, 658, 700, 1592, some Vetus Latina, and Armenian manuscripts.

== History ==
Gregory dated the manuscript to the 12th century. The manuscript is currently dated by the INTF to the 12th century.

Formerly it was housed in the monastery μεγαλων πυλων 16. The manuscript was noticed in catalogue from 1876.

It was added to the list of New Testament manuscripts by Gregory (782). Gregory saw the manuscript in 1886.

The manuscript is now housed at the National Library of Greece (81) in Athens.

== See also ==
- List of New Testament minuscules
- Biblical manuscript
- Textual criticism
- Minuscule 781
