= Minuscule 700 =

- New Testament manuscript
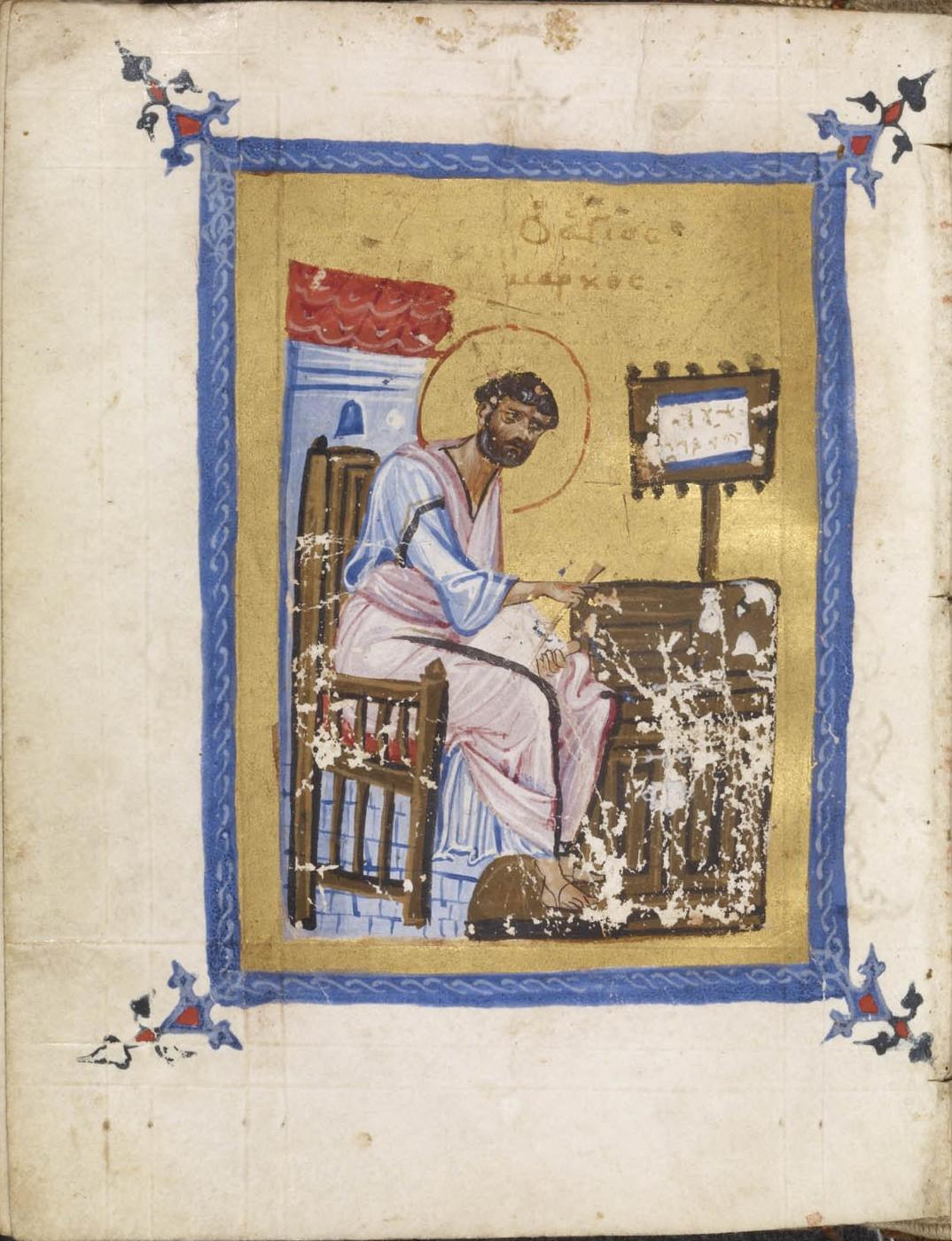
- Folio 91 verso, Evangelist Mark
- Text: Gospels
- Date: 11th century
- Script: Greek
- Now at: British Library, Egerton 2610
- Size: 14.8 cm by 11.7 cm
- Type: Caesarean text-type
- Category: III
- Note: numerous unique readings

Minuscule 700 is a Greek New Testament minuscule manuscript of the Gospels, written on parchment. It is designated by the siglum 700 in the Gregory-Aland numbering of New Testament manuscripts, and ε 133 in the von Soden numbering of New Testament manuscripts. It was formerly labelled as 604 in all New Testament manuscript lists (such as that of textual critics Frederick H. A. Scrivener, and Hoskier), however textual critic Caspar René Gregory gave it the number 700. Using the study of comparative writing styles (palaeography), it has been dated to the 11th century. It is currently housed at the British Library (Egerton MS 2610) in London.

== Description ==
The manuscript is a codex (the forerunner to the modern book), containing the complete text of the Gospels on 297 parchment leaves (14.8 cm by 11.7 cm). The text is written in one column per page, 19 lines per page in minuscule letters, with around 30 letters on each line. The initial letters are in gold and blue ink, as well as the simple headpieces (titles to each Gospel) and tailpieces (ending to each Gospel). Iota subscript (a small Greek letter ι (iota) written underneath vowels in certain words to indicate a change of sound) is never used by the initial copyist, however iota adscript (where the ι is written as part of the main text with the same function as the iota subscript) is employed quite often, most frequently with substantives, definite articles, and pronouns. The initial copyist however has used iota adscript erroneously very often: scholar and textual critic Herman C. Hoskier notes the copyist inserted iota adscript incorrectly 80 times in Matthew, 27 times in Mark, 19 times in Luke, and 23 times in John.

The text of the Gospels is divided according to the chapters (known as κεφαλαια / kephalaia), whose numbers are placed in the margin of the text, with the titles of the chapters given at the top of the pages, with gold and red ink. The tables of content lists are placed before each Gospel (Matthew, Mark, Luke). The chapters to Matthew contains only 17 entries, with the list being left unfinished. There is also a division into smaller sections, the Ammonian sections with references to the Eusebian Canons (an early system of dividing the four Gospels into different sections), although this is done in John very rarely.

It contains the Epistula ad Carpianum (a letter from the early church writer Eusebius of Caesarea, outlying his gospel harmony system, his chapter divisions of the four gospels, and their purpose); Eusebian Canon tables (list of chapters) at the beginning of the codex; subscriptions (end titles) at the close of each Gospel; illustrations of the evangelists; and lectionary markings (to indicate what verse was to be read on a specific day in the churches yearly calendar) in the margin, written in gold ink. The initial copyist left space between the weekly readings for insertion of the ἀρχ(η) (beginning) and τελ(ος) (end) markings, however they were left unfinished. The original copyist didn't add any to the Gospels of Matthew and Mark, but a few were inserted by a later copyist. The initial copyist did however insert a few in the Gospels of Luke (Luke 6:17; 10:16, 21, 22, 25, 37, 38; 12:16, 32) and John (John 1:17/18, 52/2:1), in gold ink.

Quotations from the Old Testament are sometimes marked in the margin by a diplai (>), written in gold ink. These are found at Matthew 1:23; 2:6, 15, 18; 4:6, 7, 15, 16; Luke 3:4-6; 4:10, 11, 18; 10:27; John 19:24, 37. There are none in Mark. Accents (used to indicate voiced pitch changes) and breathing marks (utilised to designate vowel emphasis) are utilised throughout. Three forms of the round stops (above, middle, and below the line), the comma, (applied to show the end of phrases/sentences) and the semicolon (used to mark a question has been asked) are employed. The three stops and comma are partially applied, although incorrectly in many instances. The semicolon is only used sparingly, and mostly neglected where the end of a question is. Itacism (spelling errors due to similar sounding letters) mistakes are witnessed, however not as many as in other codices, with Hoskier noting a total of 205 (33 in Matthew; 32 in Mark; 102 in Luke; and 38 in John). Some cases of homoeoteleuton are noticed, but very rarely (this being the omission of words/phrases which finish with either similar letters, or the same word).

Most of the conventional nomina sacra (special names/words considered sacred in Christianity - usually the first and last letters of the name/word in question are written, followed by an overline; sometimes other letters from within the word are used as well) are employed throughout (the following list is for nominative case (subject) forms): ι̅ς̅ (ιησους / Jesus); χ̅ς̅ (χριστος / Christ); θ̅ς̅ (θεος / God); κ̅ς̅ (κυριος / Lord); π̅ν̅α̅ (πνευμα / Spirit); δ̅α̅δ̅ (δαυιδ / David); ι̅η̅λ̅ (ισραηλ / Israel); π̅η̅ρ̅ (πατηρ / father); μ̅η̅ρ̅ (μητηρ / mother); σ̅η̅ρ̅ (σωτηρ / saviour); σ̅ρ̅ι̅α̅ (σωτηρια / salvation); σ̅ρ̅ι̅ο̅ς̅ (σωτηριος / salvation); ο̅υ̅ν̅ο̅ς̅ (ουρανος / heaven); ο̅υ̅ν̅ο̅ι̅ς̅ (ουρανιος / heavenly); α̅ν̅ο̅ς̅ (ανθρωπος / man); (σταυρος / cross). The nomen sacrum (singular of nomina sacra) for υιος (son / υ̅ς̅) is seen in Matthew 1:23, 3:17, 17:15; Mark 10:47; Luke 1:13, 31, 3:2. The nomen sacrum for Ιερουσαλημ (Jerusalem / ι̅λ̅η̅μ̅) is seen in Matthew 23:37; Luke 2:25, 38, 41, 43, 5:17, 6:17, 9:31, 53, 10:30, 13:4, 22, 23, 34, 19:11, 23:28, 24:13, 18, 33, 47, 49, 52.

== Text ==
The Greek text of the codex has been considered a representative of the Caesarean text-type. The text-types are groups of different New Testament manuscripts which share specific or generally related readings, which then differ from each other group, and thus the conflicting readings can separate out the groups. These are then used to determine the original text as published; there are three main groups with names: Alexandrian, Western, and Byzantine. The Caesarean text-type however (initially identified by biblical scholar Burnett Hillman Streeter) has been contested by several text-critics, such as Kurt and Barbara Aland. Aland placed it in Category III of his New Testament manuscript text classification system. Category III manuscripts are described as having "a small but not a negligible proportion of early readings, with a considerable encroachment of [Byzantine] readings, and significant readings from other sources as yet unidentified." Among Aland's test collation passages (a specific list of verses in the New Testament which have been determined to show to which text-type a manuscript belongs), the codex has 153 variants in agreement with the Byzantine text, 81 with the Byzantine and Nestle-Aland texts, 35 with the Nestle-Aland text, and 58 distinctive readings.

According to the Claremont Profile Method (a specific analysis method of textual data), it has a mixed textual relationship in Luke 1, accords to the Alexandrian text-type in Luke 10, and represents the textual family K^{x} in Luke 20. It belongs to the textual family subgroup 35.

In Matthew 27:16 it has the famous textual variant "Ιησουν τον Βαραββαν" (Jesus Barabbas). This variant is found in Codex Koridethi (Θ), and manuscripts of textual group Family 1 (ƒ^{1}). It lacks Mark 11:26.

Together with Minuscule 162, it contains the remarkable reading in the Gospel of Luke 11:2: ἐλθέτω τὸ πνεῦμά σου τὸ ἅγιον ἐφ' ἡμᾶς καὶ καθαρισάτω ἡμᾶς (May your Holy Spirit come upon us and cleanse us), instead of ελθετω η βασιλεια σου (May your kingdom come) in the Lord's Prayer. Except for these two minuscules, this peculiar reading does not appear in any other manuscript, but it was derived from a very old archetype, because it is present in Marcion's text of the third Gospel around 150 CE (Marcion was an early gnostic, considered a heretic by contemporary and later Christians), and is also attested by the church father Gregory of Nyssa in his quotations of the Gospel of Luke in his writings in the second half of the 4th century.

Hoskier's collation (a comparison of a manuscript's text with that of another, and differences between them recorded) notes 2724 variations from the Textus Receptus (before the 1900s, this was the most common printed Greek New Testament): of these 791 are omissions; 353 are additions; and 270 textual variants have not been found in any other manuscript.

Notable readings

Below are some readings of the manuscript which agree or disagree with variant readings in other Greek manuscripts, or with varying ancient translations of the New Testament. See the main article Textual variants in the New Testament.

Mark 5:9

απεκριθη λεγων (he answered, saying) — 700 E 565
απεκριτη (he answered) — D it
λεγει αυτω (he said to him) — Majority of manuscripts
-
λεγιων ονομα μοι (my name is Legion) — 700* א^{c2} B^{c2} C L Δ 579
λεγεων (Legeon) — 700^{c(vid)} א* B* A W Θ ƒ^{1} ƒ^{13} Byz

Mark 10:19

μη αποστερησης (do not defraud)

omit — 700 B K W Ψ ƒ^{1} ƒ^{13} 28 1010 1079 1242 1546 2148 ℓ 10 ℓ 950 ℓ 1642 ℓ 1761 sy^{s} arm geo

Luke 6:2

οὐκ ἔξεστιν (not lawful) — 700 𝔓^{4} B (D) N lat sa bo arm geo
οὐκ ἔξεστιν ποιεῖν (not lawful to do) - Majority of manuscripts

Luke 11:4

αλλα ρυσαι ημας απο του πονηρου (but deliver us from evil)

omit — 700 א B L ƒ^{1} vg sy^{s} sa bo arm geo
incl. — Majority of manuscripts

John 8:7

αναβλεψας (having looked up) — 700 U Λ ƒ^{13}
ανακυψας (having got up) — Majority of manuscripts

John 8:8

ενος εκαστου αυτων τας αμαρτιας (the sins of each of them)

incl. — 700 U (030) 73 331 364 658 782 1592 lat arm (652^{mg}; 264 in John 8:6)
omit — Other manuscripts

== History ==
The author of the codex is unknown. It was probably written in Constantinople (modern day Istanbul in Turkey).

The codex was bought on the 28th April, 1882 for the British Museum, through the auspices of Edward Maunde Thompson, the then Principal Keeper of manuscripts at the British Museum. The codex was previously in the hands of a German bookseller.

It was examined by Anglican clergyman Dean Burgon, and it was described and collated by scholars W. H. Simcox, Scrivener, and Hoskier. The collation and comments of W. H. Simcox were severely criticised by Hoskier for its numerous mistakes. The manuscript is now located in the British Library in London (Egerton MS 2610).

== See also ==
- List of New Testament minuscules
- Textual criticism
- Biblical manuscript
