= Minuscule 196 =

- New Testament manuscript
- Text: Gospels
- Date: 12th century
- Script: Greek
- Now at: Laurentian Library
- Size: 24.6 cm by 18.4 cm
- Type: Byzantine text-type
- Category: V
- Note: marginalia

Minuscule 196 (in the Gregory-Aland numbering), Z^{ε23} (Soden), is a Greek minuscule manuscript of the New Testament, on parchment. Palaeographically it has been assigned to the 12th century. It has marginalia.

== Description ==
The codex contains a complete text of the four Gospels on 369 thick parchment leaves (size 24.6 cm by 18.4 cm). The text is written in one column per page, 44 lines per page, biblical text in red, commentary's text in black ink.

The text is divided according to the κεφαλαια (chapters), whose numbers are given at the margin, and the τιτλοι (titles of chapters) at the top of the pages.

The text of Matt 15:10-17:22 is written on paper, in 27 lines per page. It contains prolegomena, lists of the κεφαλαια (lists of contents) before each Gospel, and portraits of the Evangelists (Luke with his disciple, John with Prochorus). The biblical text is surrounded by a catena. The biblical text is written in red ink, the catena text in black.

== Text ==
The Greek text of the codex is a representative of the Byzantine text-type. Aland placed it in Category V. It was not examined by the Claremont Profile Method.

== History ==
The manuscript once belonged to Lorenzo de Midicis, who presented it in 1473 to the Convent of S. Marco de Florentia des Predigerordens.

It was examined by Bianchini, Birch, Scholz, and Burgon. C. R. Gregory saw it in 1886.

It is currently housed at the Laurentian Library (Plutei. VIII. 12), at Florence.

== See also ==
- List of New Testament minuscules
- Biblical manuscript
- Textual criticism
