= Gospel of the Nazarenes =

Lost Christian gospel

The Gospel of the Nazarenes (also Nazareans, Nazaraeans, Nazoreans, or Nazoraeans) is the traditional but hypothetical name given by some scholars to distinguish some of the references to, or citations of, non-canonical Jewish–Christian gospels extant in patristic writings from other citations believed to derive from different Gospels.

== Collation into Gospel of the Nazarenes ==
Due to contradictions in the account of the baptism of Jesus, and other reasons, most scholars in the 20th century consider that the Gospel of the Nazarenes is distinct from the Gospel of the Hebrews and Gospel of the Ebionites, even though Jerome linked the Nazarenes to the Ebionites in their shared use of the Gospel of the Hebrews.

=== Text editions of Gospel of the Nazarenes ===
The current standard critical edition of the text is found in Wilhelm Schneemelcher's New Testament Apocrypha, where 36 verses, GN 1 to GN 36, are collated. GN 1 to GN 23 are mainly from Jerome, GN 24 to GN 36 are from medieval sources. This classification is now traditional, though Craig A. Evans (2005) suggests that "If we have little confidence in the traditional identification of the three Jewish gospels (Nazarenes, Ebionites, and Hebrews), then perhaps we should work with the sources we have: (1) the Jewish gospel known to Origen; (2) the Jewish gospel known to Epiphanius; and (3) the Jewish gospel known to Jerome.

=== The name Gospel of the Nazarenes ===
The name Gospel of the Nazarenes was first used in Latin by Paschasius Radbertus (790–865), and around the same time by Haimo, though it is a natural progression from what Jerome writes. The descriptions evangelium Nazarenorum and ablative in evangelio Nazarenorum, etc. become commonplace in later discussion.

The hypothetical name refers to a possible identification with the Nazarene community of Roman period Palestine. It is a hypothetical gospel, which may or may not be the same as, or derived from, the Gospel of the Hebrews or the canonical Gospel of Matthew. The title Gospel of the Nazarenes is a neologism as it was not mentioned in the Catalogues of the Early Church nor by any of the Church Fathers. Today, all that remains of its original text are notations, quotations, and commentaries from various Church Fathers including Hegesippus, Origen, Eusebius and Jerome.

The Gospel of the Nazarenes has been the subject of many critical discussions and surmises throughout the course of the last century. Recent discussions in a growing body of literature have thrown considerable light upon the problems connected with this gospel. Its sole literary witnesses are brief citations found in patristic literature and quotations by the Church Fathers. This bears great significance because higher criticism argues that the canonical Gospel of Matthew is not a literal reproduction of Matthew's original autograph, but was rather the production of an unknown redactor, composed in Greek posthumous to Matthew. This aligns with Jerome's assessment, in which he stated, "Matthew, also called Levi, apostle and aforetime publican, composed a gospel of Christ at first published in Judea in Hebrew for the sake of those of the circumcision who believed, but this was afterwards translated into Greek, though by what author is uncertain." (see Two-source hypothesis, Four-document hypothesis, and Hebrew Gospel hypothesis).

== Nazarenes ==
The term Nazarene was applied to Jesus of Nazareth (Gospel of Matthew 2:23). Mention of a "sect of the Nazarenes" (plural) occurs first with Tertullus (Acts 24:5). After Tertullus the name does not appear again, apart from an unclear reference in Eusebius' Onomasticon, until a similar name, "Nazoreans", is distinguished by Epiphanius in his Panarion in the 4th century.

It was the term used to identify the predominantly Jewish sect that believed Jesus was the Messiah and would later be known as Christians.

By the 4th century, Nazarenes are generally accepted as being the first Christians that adhered to the Mosaic law and who were led by James the Just, the brother of Jesus. He led the Church from Jerusalem and according to 1 Corinthians (15:7) had a special appearance of the resurrected Jesus, who appeared only "then to all the apostles".

== Primary sources ==
Concerning its origin, Jerome relates that the Nazarenes believed that the Hebrew Gospel he received while at Chalcis was written by Matthew the Evangelist. In his work On Illustrious Men, Jerome explains that Matthew, also called Levi, composed a gospel of Christ, which was first published in Judea in Hebrew script for the sake of those of the circumcision who believed (On Illustrious Men, 2). Meanwhile, in his Commentary on Matthew, Jerome refers to the Gospel of the Nazarenes and the Gospel of the Hebrews.

Epiphanius is of the same opinion; he states in his Panarion that Matthew alone expounded and declared the gospel in Hebrew among the New Testament writers: "For in truth, Matthew alone of the New Testament writers expounded and declared the Gospel in Hebrew using Hebrew script."

Origen adds to this by stating that, among the four gospels, Matthew, the one-time tax collector who later became an apostle of Jesus Christ, first composed the gospel for the converts from Judaism, published in the Hebrew language.

== Scholarly positions ==
There exist two views concerning the relationship of the surviving citations from the "Gospel of the Nazarenes":

=== Gospel of the Nazarenes dependent on Canonical Matthew ===
Philipp Vielhauer writes of the Greek/Latin fragments collected as the Gospel of the Nazarenes that "Its literary character shows the GN secondary as compared with the canonical Mt; again, from the point of view of form-criticism and the history of tradition, as well as from that of language, it presents no proto-Matthew but a development of the Greek Gospel of Matthew (against Waitz). 'It is scarcely to be assumed that in it we are dealing with an independent development of older Aramaic traditions; this assumption is already prohibited by the close relationship with Mt. Likewise, as regards the Syriac fragments, Vielhauer writes "the Aramaic (Syriac) GN cannot be explained as a retroversion of the Greek Mt; the novelistic expansions, new formations, abbreviations and corrections forbid that. In literary terms the GN may best be characterised as a targum-like rendering of the canonical Matthew." From this view the GN fragments are linked to the canonical version of Matthew, with minor differences. For example, GN replaces "daily bread" with "bread for tomorrow" in the Lord's Prayer (GN 5), states that the man whose hand was withered (GN 10, compare Matthew 12:10–13) was a stonemason, and narrates there having been two rich men addressed by Jesus in Matthew 19:16–22 instead of one (GN 16).

=== Canonical Matthew is dependent on or a translation of the Gospel of Nazarenes ===
James R. Edwards (2009) argues that the canonical Matthew is based on a Hebrew original, and that the citations of the Gospel of the Nazarenes are part of that original.

Edwards' view is predated by that of Edward Nicholson (1879), Bodley's Librarian. His conclusions were as follows:

1. "We find that there existed among the Nazarenes and Ebionites a Gospel commonly called the Gospel according to the Hebrews, written in Aramaic, but with Hebrew characters. Its authorship was attributed by some to the Apostles in general, but by very many or most—including clearly the Nazarenes and Ebionites themselves—to Matthew."
2. "The Fathers of the Church, while the Gospel according to the Hebrews was yet extant in its entirety, referred to it always with respect, often with reverence: some of them unhesitatingly accepted it as being what tradition affirmed it to be—the work of Matthew—and even those who have not put on record their expression of this opinion have not questioned it. Is such an attitude consistent with the supposition that the Gospel according to the Hebrews was a work of heretical tendencies? This applies with tenfold force to Jerome. After copying it, would he, if he had seen heresy in it, have translated it for public dissemination into both Greek and Latin, and have continued to favor the tradition of its Matthaean authorship? And Jerome, be it observed, not only quotes all three of these passages without disapprobation; he actually quotes two of them (Fr. 6 and Fr. 8) with approval."

Nicholson's position that The Gospel of the Hebrews was the true Gospel of Matthew is still the subject of heated debate.

The Talmudic evidence for early Christian gospels, combined with Papias' reference to the Hebrew "logia" (Eusebius, Church History III . 39 . 16) and Jerome's discovery of the Gospel of the Hebrews in Aramaic (Jerome, Against Pelagius 3.2) have led scholars such as C. C. Torrey (1951) to consider an original Aramaic or Hebrew gospel, meaning the Gospel of the Hebrews which the Nazarenes used.

The Gospel of the Nazarenes (Nazoraeans) emphasized the Jewishness of Jesus. According to multiple early sources, including Jerome (Against Pelagius 3) and Epiphanius (Panarion 29-30) the Gospel of the Nazarenes was synonymous with the Gospel of the Hebrews and the Gospel of the Ebionites. Ron Cameron considers this a dubious link.

=== Time and place of authorship ===
The time and place of authorship are disputed, but since Clement of Alexandria used the book in the last quarter of the second century, it consequently predates 200 AD. Its place of origin might be Alexandria, Egypt, since two of its principal witnesses, Clement and Origen, were Alexandrians. However, the original language of the Gospel of the Nazarenes was Hebrew or Aramaic, suggesting that it was written specifically for Hebrew-speaking Jewish Christians in Palestine, Syria, and contingencies.

== The extant reconstructed text of Gospel of the Nazarenes and variances with Canonical Matthew ==
The following list represents variant readings found in Gospel of the Nazarenes against the canonical Gospel of Matthew: Where Ehrman's order corresponds to the Schneemelcher numbering "(GN 2)" etc., is added for clarity:

- (GN 2) In Matthew 3, it reads: "Behold, the mother of the Lord and his brethren said to him, 'John the Baptist is baptizing unto the remission of sins; let us go and be baptized by him.' But He said to them, 'Wherein have I sinned that I should go and be baptized by him? Unless what I have just said is (a sin of?) ignorance.'" (Jerome, Against Pelagius 3.2")
- (GN 3) Matthew 4:5 has not "into the holy city" but "to Jerusalem."
- (GN 4) Matthew 5:22 lacks the phrase "without a cause" as in $\mathfrak{P}$^{67} א B 2174, some vg^{mss}, some eth^{mss}
- (GN 5) Matthew 6:11 reads, "Give us today our bread for tomorrow." (Jerome, Commentary on Matthew 6:11)
- (GN 6) Matthew 7:23 adds, "If ye be in my bosom, but do not the will of my Father in heaven, out of my bosom I will cast you." Compare with noncanonical 2 Clement 2:15.
- (GN 7) Matthew 10:16 has "wise more than serpents" rather than "wise as serpents."
- (GN 23) On Matthew 10:34–36, the Syriac translation of Eusebius' Theophania contains: 'He (Christ) himself taught the reason for the separations of souls that take place in houses, as we have found somewhere in the Gospel that is spread abroad among the Jews in the Hebrew tongue, in which it is said, "I choose for myself the most worthy; the most worthy are those whom my Father in heaven has given me."' (Eusebius, Theophania, Syriac translation 4.12)
- (GN 8) Matthew 11:12 reads "is plundered" instead of "suffers violence."
- (GN 9) Matthew 11:25 has "I thank thee" rather than "I praise you."
- (GN 10) At Matthew 12:10–13, the man who had the withered hand is described as a mason who pleaded for help in the following words: "I was a mason seeking a livelihood with my hands. I beseech thee, Jesus, to restore me to my health, that I may not in shame have to beg for my food." (Jerome, Commentary on Matthew 12:13)
- (GN 11) Matthew 12:40 omits "three days and three nights" immediately preceding "in the heart of the earth."
- (GN 12) Matthew 15:5 reads, "It is a korban (offering) by which ye may be profited by me." Compare Mark 7:11.
- (GN 13) Matthew 16:2b–3 omitted, as in א B V X Y Γ Uncial 047 2 34 39 44 84 151 157 180 194 272 274 344 376 539 563 595 661 776 777 788 792 826 828 1073 1074 1076 1078 1080 1216 2542 syr^{cur} syr^{s} cop^{sa} cop^{bo^{mss}} arm f^{13} Origen.
- (GN 14) Matthew 16:17 has Hebrew "Shimon ben Yochanan" (Simon son of John) instead of Aramaic "Simon Bar-Jonah" (Simon son of Jonah).
- (GN 15) At Matthew 18:21–22, Jesus is recorded as having said: "If your brother has sinned by word, and has made three reparations, receive him seven times in a day." Simon his disciple said to him, "Seven times in a day?" The Lord answered, saying to him, "Yea, I say unto thee, until seventy times seven times. For in the Prophets also, after they were anointed with the Holy Spirit, a word of sin was found. (Jerome, Against Pelagius 3.2)
- (GN 16) At Matthew 19:16–24, Origen, in his Commentary on Matthew, records there having been two rich men who approached Jesus along the way. Origen records that the second rich man asked Jesus, "Rabbi, what good thing can I do that I may live?" He (Jesus) said to him, "Man, fulfill the Law and the Prophets." He answered him, "I have done (so)." Jesus said, "Go, sell all that you have, and distribute to the poor; and come, follow me." But the rich man began to fidget (some copies read, 'began to scratch his head'), for it did not please him. And the Lord said to him, "How can you say, 'I have fulfilled the Law and the Prophets', when it is written in the Law: 'You shall love your neighbor as yourself', and many of your brothers, sons of Abraham, are covered with filth, dying of hunger, and your house is full of many good things, none of which goes out to them?" And he (Jesus) turned and said to Simon his disciple, who was sitting by him, "Simon son of John, it is easier for a camel to go through the eye of a needle than for the rich to enter into the Kingdom of Heaven."
- (GN 17) At Matthew 21:12, Jerome records, "For a certain fiery and starry light shone from His eyes, and the majesty of the Godhead gleamed in His face." Also, there is quoted in a marginal note of a thirteenth-century manuscript of the Aurora by Peter of Riga the following: "Rays issued forth from His eyes which terrified them and put them to flight."
- (GN 18) Matthew 23:35 reads "Zechariah, the son of Jehoiada" instead of "Zechariah, the son of Barachiah."(Jerome, Commentary on Matthew 23:35)
- (GN 19) Matthew 26:74 has, "And he denied, and he swore (i.e., took an oath), and he cursed (i.e., forswore)."
- (GN 21) Matthew 27:51 states not that the veil of the temple was rent, but that the lintel of the temple of wondrous size collapsed.
- (GN 22) Matthew 27:65 reads, "And he (Pilate) delivered to them (the chief priests and the Pharisees) armed men, that they might sit over against the tomb and guard it day and night."
- GN 4, 6, 15a, 19, 22 come from the 'Zion Gospel Edition', the subscriptions of thirty-six Gospel manuscripts dating from the 9th to the 13th centuries.
- GN 24–36 (not listed) are derived from medieval sources.

== See also ==
- Didache
- Gospel of the Ebionites – 7 fragments preserved by Epiphanius of Salamis
- Gospel of the Hebrews – 7 fragments preserved by Jerome
- Gospel of Matthew
- Hebrew Gospel of Matthew – 3 medieval rabbinical translations of Greek Matthew into Hebrew
- Jewish-Christian Gospels – overview of the topic
- List of Gospels
- New Testament apocrypha – non-canonical and/or pseudepigraphical Gospels, Acts, and Epistles
- Synoptic Gospels – Matthew, Mark and Luke
- Gospel of the Holy Twelve – a disputed, widely believed to be pseudepigraphical, text
