= Luke 22:43–44 =

Passage in the Gospel of Luke

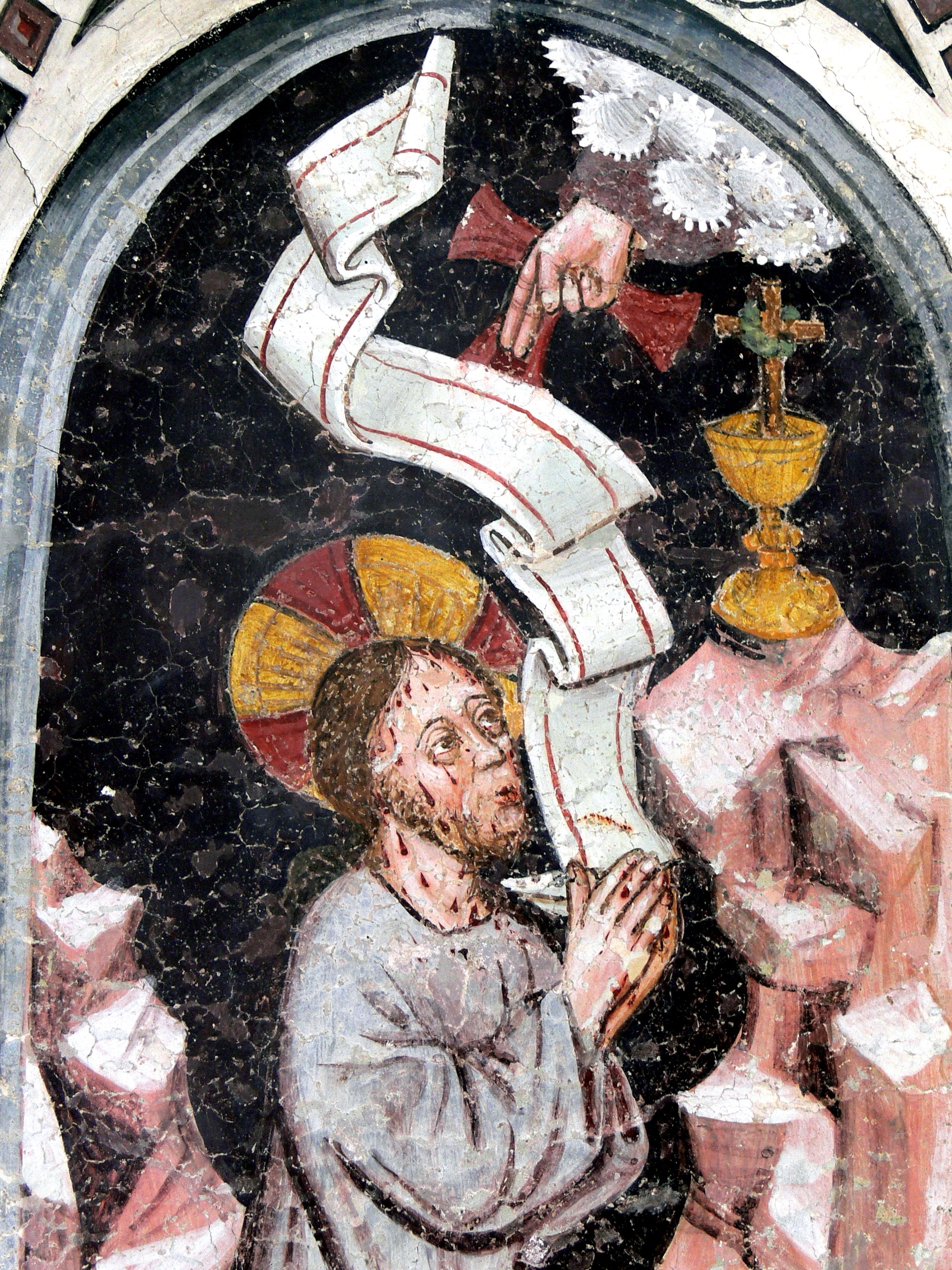
Christ on the Mount of Olives

Luke 22:43–44 is a passage in the Gospel of Luke describing Jesus' anguish in the Garden on the Mount of Olives and his prayer, after which he receives strength from an angel, prior to his betrayal and arrest. It is one of several passages which appear in most versions of the New Testament, but are absent in many other manuscripts, marked with signs in others, and not cited by some Early Church Fathers.

The authenticity of the passage has been disputed by scholars since the second half of the 19th century. The verses are placed in double brackets in modern editions of the Greek text, and in a footnote in the Revised Standard Version.

== Text ==
ὤφθη δὲ αὐτῷ ἄγγελος ἀπ' οὐρανοῦ ἐνισχύων αὐτὸν. καὶ γενόμενος ἐν ἀγωνίᾳ ἐκτενέστερον προσηύχετο. ἐγένετο δὲ ὁ ἱδρὼς αὐτοῦ ὡσεὶ θρόμβοι αἵματος καταβαίνοντες ἐπὶ τὴν γῆν.

Ōphthē de autō angelos ap' ouranou enischyōn auton. Kai genomenos en agōnia ektenesteron prosēucheto. Egeneto de ho hidrōs autou hōsei thromboi haimatos katabainontes epi tēn gēn.

And there appeared to him an angel from heaven, strengthening him. And being in an agony he prayed more earnestly; and his sweat became like great drops of blood falling down upon the ground.–Luke 22:43–44

== Manuscript evidence ==
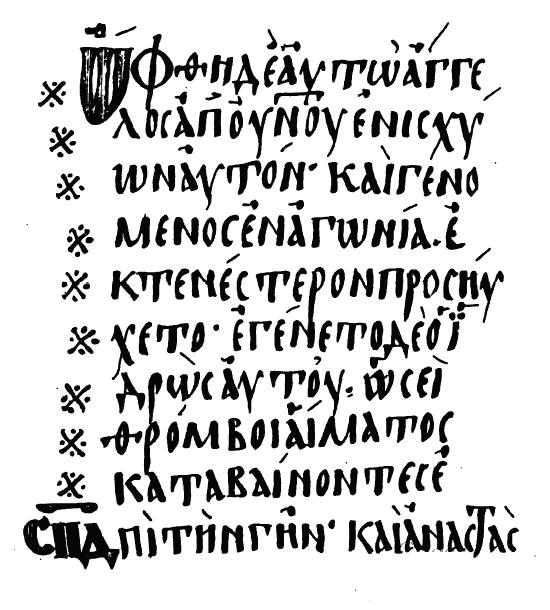
Codex Vaticanus 354

Manuscripts that exclude passage
Papyrus 69 (𝔓^{69}), Papyrus 75 (𝔓^{75}), Codex Sinaiticus (א)^{1}, Alexandrinus (A), Vaticanus (B), Petropolitanus Purpureus (N), Nitriensis (R), Borgianus (T), Washingtonianus (W), the minuscules 158, 512, 542, 552, 579, 777, 826, 1071*, 1128, some lectionaries (ℓ^{pt}), Latin Codex Brixianus (f), the Syriac Sinaiticus (syr^{s}), Coptic Sahidic (sa), Bohairic (bo), some Armenian manuscripts, and some Georgian manuscripts.

Manuscripts that include passage
Codex Sinaiticus (א)*^{, 2}, Bezae (D), Laudianus (E), Seidelianus I (G), Seidelianus II (H), Cyprius (K), Regius (L), Campianus (M), Guelferbytanus B (Q), Sinopensis (O), Nanianus (U), Monacensis (X), Sangallensis 48 (Δ)*, Tischendorfianus III (Λ), Athous Lavrensis (Ψ), Uncial 0171, the minuscules Family 1 (ƒ^{1}), 174, 565, 700, 892, 1009, 1010, 1071^{mg}, 1230, 1241, 1242, 1253, 1344, 1365, 1546, 1646, 2148, 2174, the lectionaries ℓ 184, ℓ 211, Byz, the Vetus Latin manuscripts (it), the Latin Vulgate (vg), the Syriac Curetonian Gospels (syr^{cur}), Harklean (syr^{h}), Peshitta (syr^{p}), Palestinian Syriac (syr^{pal}), Armenian and Ethiopian manuscripts, and the Diatessaron.

Manuscripts that question passage
Marked with asterisks (※) or obeli (÷). Codex Sangallensis 48 (Δ), Petropolitanus (N)^{c}, Vaticanus 354 (S), Athous Dionysiou (Ω), the minuscules 166, 481, 655, 661, 669, 776, 829, 892^{mg}, 1077, 1079, 1195, 1216, lectionary ℓ 283, and some Coptic Bohairic manuscripts (cop^{bo^{mss}}). Minuscule 34 has questionable scholion at the margin.

Manuscripts that relocate passage
Manuscripts of the textual family ƒ^{13} transpose the passage after Matthew 26:39. Several lectionaries transpose Luke 22:43-45a after Matthew 26:39.

Lacuna
Codex Ephraemi Rescriptus (C) (22:19-23:25) and Minuscule 33 (Luke 21:38-23:26) lack the text for this passage.

== Interpretation ==
=== Church Fathers ===
Justin, Hippolytus, Dionysius, Eusebius, Epiphanius, Chrysostom, Jerome, Augustine, Theodoret, Cosmas, Hilary, Leonitus, Facundus, and Theodore include the passage.

Irenaeus used it as an argument against the Docetae.

Hilary of Poitiers: "(...) let not the heretics encourage themselves that herein lies a confirmation of His weakness, that He needed the help and comfort of an angel. Let them remember the Creator of the angels needs not the support of His creatures." (De Trinitate, Book 10, para. 41).

Theodore of Mopsuestia wrote: "When our Lord was in deep thought and fear at the approach of His Passion, the blessed Luke said that 'an angel appeared to Him strengthening and encouraging Him,'"(Comm. on Lord's Prayer, Baptism and Eucharist; Ch. 5)

Clement of Alexandria and Origen excluded the passage. Hilary notes that the "most complete copies" don't include the passage. Jerome also knows of manuscript copies which don't include the passage.

=== Modern interpretations ===
The situation of Jesus, prior to the completion of his ministry, begging weakness before God in view of the difficult task he is to perform, has been compared to the account in Exodus 3, wherein the prophet Moses speaks to God and pleads weakness when told to confront Pharaoh.

Pope Pius XI and Pope Francis refer to the angel from heaven and suggest that the Christian believer, in a mystical connection with Jesus' passion, can also offer Jesus "consolation".

== Modern scholarly views ==
- Thomas Hartwell Horne (1856): "the reason for the omission of these verses in some manuscripts and for their being marked as suspected in others, is by some supposed to have been that they were rejected by some of the more timid, lest they should appear to favour the Arians: it may be that they were omitted in Luke from their being early read in a lesson containing part of Matt. XXVI."
- Dean Burgon (1883) said that "These two Verses were excised through mistaken piety by certain of the orthodox, jealous for the honour of their LORD, and alarmed by the use which the impugners of His GOD head freely made of them. "He also cites Ephraem, who "puts... into the mouth of Satan, addressing the host of Hell" a statement of rejoicing over the Lord's agony.
- Francis Crawford Burkitt called this passage as "the Greater Interpolations". According to Herman C. Hoskier it can be result of the influence of the docetics of Alexandria.
- Joel B. Green and Scott McKnight (1992) wrote in The Dictionary of Jesus and the Gospels, "Others, however, observe the impressive Lukan character of these verses, which speaks for their originality to the Third Gospel. In addition to (1) the inclusion of characteristic Lukan vocabulary (Green 1988, 56–57), one may also observe (2) the Lukan emphasis on the appearance of an angel (e.g., 1:11, 26; 2:13, 15; Acts 5:19; 7:30; 8:26; 10:3; 12:7), (3) Luke's interest in simile ("his sweat was like drops of blood," v. 44; cf. e.g., 3:22; 10:18; 11:44; 22:31) and (4) Luke's fondness for physical manifestations (like sweat) accompanying extramundane events (e.g., 1:20; 3:22; Acts 2:2–3; 9:18). These data, along with the fact that the presence of these verses is of a piece with Luke's interpretation of this scene as a whole, point clearly to the originality of 22:43–44. Moreover, it is not difficult to imagine a rationale for the early exclusion of these verses in the manuscript tradition. The portrait of Jesus contained therein—human, agonizing, needful, requiring angelic support—would have been problematic to some (cf. Gos. Nic. 20; Green 1988, 56). Accordingly, they may have been dropped for doctrinal reasons. There is thus good reason for taking these verses as original to Luke."
- Kurt Aland (1995): "These verses exhibit a conclusive clue to their secondary nature (like the Pericope Adulterae) in the alternative locations for its insertion. While the majority of the (now known) manuscripts place them at Luke 22:43-44, they are found after Matthew 26:39 in the minuscule family 13 and in several lectionaries. This kind of fluctuation in the New Testament manuscript tradition is one of the surest evidences for the secondary character of a text."
- Bruce M. Metzger (2005): "These verses are absent from some of the oldest and best witnesses, including the majority of the Alexandrian manuscripts. It is striking to note that the earliest witnesses attesting the verses are three Church fathers – Justin, Irenaeus, and Hippolytus – each of whom uses the verses in order to counter Christological views that maintained that Jesus was not a full human who experienced the full range of human sufferings. It may well be that the verses were added to the text for just this reason, in opposition to those who held to a docetic Christology".
- Bart D. Ehrman (1993): "these two verses disrupt the literary structure of the scene (the chiasmus), they are not found in the early and valuable manuscripts, and they are the only place in Luke where Jesus is seen to be in agony." Ehrman concludes that they were inserted in order to counter doceticism, the belief that Jesus, as divine, only seemed to suffer. While probably not original to the text, these verses reflect first-century tradition."
- Lincoln Blummel (2014): "The present argument for the deliberate omission of the passage has an inherent advantage over the anti-docetic interpolation theory since it more closely conforms to the extant manuscript and patristic evidence. All of the earliest evidence from the middle and latter half of the second century establishes that Luke 22:43–44 was otherwise known (i.e. Justin, Irenaeus, Tatian [?]), as well as the earliest extant fragment of Luke (0171), from the late second or early third century, whereas it is not until some time in the third century, and potentially even the latter part of the third century, when this passage is not attested. Given the nature of the evidence, it favors the interpretation that the passage was present and was then omitted, thus following the contours of the extant evidence, and not that it must necessarily have been added sometime in the early second century prior to its first attestation by Justin Martyr as Ehrman and others suppose." Lincoln Blummel concluded that there are legitimate grounds for both seriously questioning the whole anti-docetic interpolation theory as well as taking seriously the theory for the early excision of Luke 22:43–44 from select manuscripts."

== See also ==
- List of New Testament verses not included in modern English translations
- Hematidrosis

Other disputed passages

- Comma Johanneum (1 John 5:7b-8a)
- Doxology to the Lord's Prayer
- John 5:3b-4
- Jesus and the woman taken in adultery (John 7:53-8:11)
- Luke 22:19b-20
- Mark 16:8-20
- Matthew 16:2b–3
