= Minuscule 348 =

- New Testament manuscript
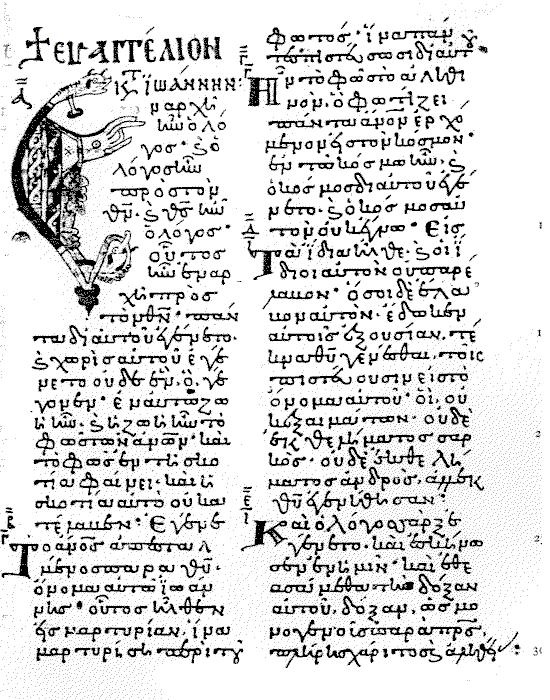
- Folio 150 recto with text of John 1:1-14
- Text: Gospels
- Date: 1022
- Script: Greek
- Now at: Biblioteca Ambrosiana
- Cite: Scholz, Biblisch-kritische Reise (1823)
- Size: 19.2 cm by 14.5 cm
- Type: Byzantine text-type (not purely)
- Category: none
- Note: full marginalia

Minuscule 348 (in the Gregory-Aland numbering), ε 227 (Soden), is a Greek minuscule manuscript of the New Testament, on parchment. Dated by a colophon to the year 1022 (29 December). It has full marginalia.

== Description ==
The codex contains a complete text of the four Gospels on 187 parchment leaves (19.2 cm by 14.5 cm). The text is written in two columns per page, in 30-31 lines per page. The large initial letters are rubricated, the initial for epsilon has motif of the hand.

The text is divided according to the κεφαλαια (chapters), whose numbers are given at the margin, and their τιτλοι (titles of chapters) at the top of the pages. There is also a division according to the Ammonian Sections (in Mark 236 Sections, the last in 16:11), with references to the Eusebian Canons (written below Ammonian Section numbers).

It contains the Eusebian Canon tables, Argumentum, the Epistula ad Carpianum, Prolegomena, lectionary markings at the margin (for liturgical use), liturgical books with hagiographies (Synaxarion and Menologion). It has subscriptions at the end of each Gospel with numbers of stichoi.

The texts of Matthew 16:2b–3, John 5:4, and John 7:53-8:11 are marked by an obelus. Citations from the Old Testament are marked by an asterisk.

== Text ==
The Greek text of the codex is a representative of the Byzantine text-type, but with some alien readings. Hermann von Soden classified it as I^{βα}. Kurt Aland did not place it in any Category. According to the Claremont Profile Method it belongs to the textual group 1216 in Luke 1, Luke 10, and Luke 20 as a core member.

Textually it is close to the manuscripts 477 and 1279.

== History ==
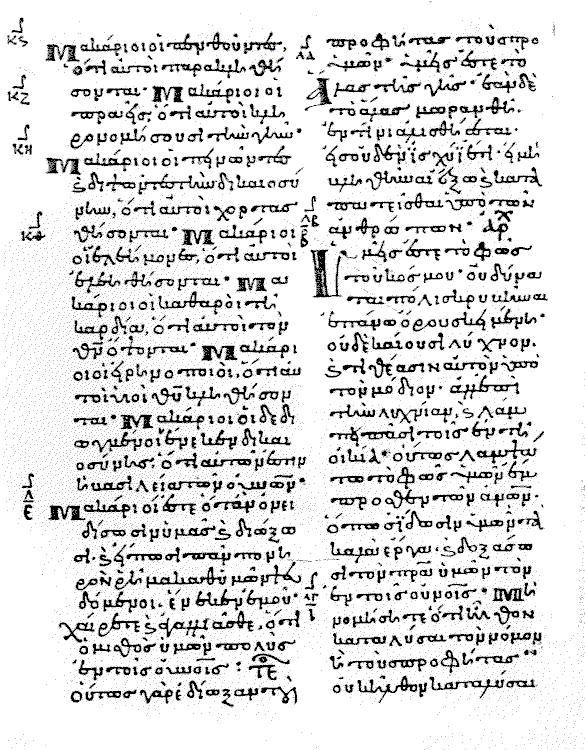
Folio 28 verso with text of Matthew 5:4-17

According to the colophon it was written in the year 1023 December 29. The colophon states: εγραφη συν θεω η βιβλος ταυτη των αγιων και αραπτων ευαγγελιων: ετους βφλα, ινδ εις τας ΚΘ δεκεμβριου μηνος η χειρ μεν η γραψασα σηπεται ταφω, γραφη δε μενει προς χρονους πληρεστατους.

The manuscript was written in Calabria. It once belonged to "J. V. Pinelli".

The manuscript was examined by Scholz, who collated it in some places. It was added to the list of New Testament manuscripts by Scholz (1794–1852). Edward Maunde Thompson edited facsimile of one page the codex. Burgon saw it. C. R. Gregory saw it in 1886.

The manuscript is currently housed at the Biblioteca Ambrosiana (B. 56 sup.) in Milan.

== See also ==
- List of New Testament minuscules
- Biblical manuscript
- Textual criticism
