= Bloody Tears =

Bloody Tears may refer to:

- Haemolacria, the medical condition where tears contain blood
- Bloody Tears, a theme music in the Castlevania video game series
- "Bloody Tears", a song by Army of the Pharaohs from the 2007 album Ritual of Battle
