= Morgenrot =

Morgenrot (German: dawning, red sky at morning) can mean:

- Morgenrot (film), a 1933 German submarine film set during World War I
- de:Morgenrot (Band), a 1970-80s German band
