= Family K1 =

Family K^{1} is a small group of the New Testament manuscripts. It belongs to the Byzantine text-type as one of the textual families of this group. It has five uncials, and several early minuscules. It is one of the smallest subfamilies of the Byzantine text-type, but one of the oldest.

== Description ==
The group was discovered by Hermann von Soden and designated by him with the symbol K^{1}. Wisse included this group to the K^{x} (and K^{i}), and according to him it is the only subgroup or cluster of K^{x}. But the opinion of Wisse is based on a small sample size, only three chapters of Luke — chapters 1; 10; and 20. Based on age alone, it appears that K^{1} is independent of K^{x}. The leading members of the group, according to Soden, are manuscripts S, V, and Ω.

According to Soden the group K^{1} is the oldest form of the Kappa–text, dating from the 4th century and resulting from Lucian's recension.

The texts of Matthew 16:2b–3 (the signs of the times), Luke 22:43-44, John 5:3.4, and the Pericope Adulterae (John 7:53–8:11) are marked with an asterisk (※) as doubtful. The text of Mark 16:8-20 has not numbered by κεφαλαια (chapters) at the margin and their τιτλοι (titles) at the top.

The group probably evolved from Family E. It represents the earliest stage of the Kappa-text.

== Members of the family ==
- Codex Vaticanus 354 designated by S or 028 (Gregory-Aland), 949 A.D.
- Codex Mosquensis II designated by V or 031 (Gregory-Aland), 9th century
- Codex Athous Dionysiou designated by Ω or 045 (Gregory-Aland), 8th/9th century
- Uncial 0211, 7th century
- Minuscule 261, 12th century
- Minuscule 263, 13th century
- Minuscule 272, 11th century
- Minuscule 277, 11th century
- Minuscule 382, 11th century
- (Minuscule 399), 9th century
- Uspenski Gospels designated by 461 (Gregory-Aland), 835 A.D.
- Minuscule 476, 11th century
- Minuscule 500, 13th century
- Minuscule 509, 12th century
- Minuscule 655, 11th century
- Minuscule 661, 11th century
- Minuscule 699, 11th century
- Minuscule 711, 11th century

== See also ==
Other subfamilies of the Byzantine text

- Family K^{r}
- Family K^{x}
- Family E
- Family Π

Families associated with the Byzantine text

- Family 1424
- Family 1739
