= Minuscule 994 =

- New Testament manuscript
- Text: Gospels
- Date: 10th/11th century
- Script: Greek
- Now at: Iviron monastery
- Size: 28.4 cm by 21.7 cm
- Type: Byzantine text-type
- Category: V
- Note: marginalia

Minuscule 994 (in the Gregory-Aland numbering), A^{227} C^{ι33} (von Soden), is a 10th or 11th-century Greek minuscule manuscript of the New Testament on parchment. The manuscript has not survived in complete condition. It has some marginalia.

== Description ==
The codex contains the text of the Gospel of Matthew (folios 1-130) and the Gospel of John (folios 131-246), with a commentary, on 246 parchment leaves (size 28.4 cm by 21.7 cm), with some lacunae in Matthew 1:1-2:19; John 21:23-25. Some leaves added in on paper are in a later hand.

The text is written in one column per page, 36 lines per page. The handwriting is close to the half-uncial script, as in Uncial 055 and Uncial 0141.

The text is divided according to the small Ammonian Sections, whose numbers are given at the margin, with references to the Eusebian Canons (written below Ammonian Section numbers), but it was made by a later hand. The tables of contents (tables of κεφαλαια) are placed before each Gospel.

== Text ==
The Greek text of the codex is a representative of the Byzantine text-type. Kurt Aland placed the Greek text of the codex in Category V.

The text of Matthew 16:2b–3 (Signs of the times) was omitted by the original scribe, but it was added by a later hand in the margin.

== History ==
C. R. Gregory dated the manuscript to the 10th century. Currently the manuscript is dated by the INTF to the 10th or 11th century.

The manuscript was added to the list of New Testament manuscripts by Gregory (994^{e}). C. R. Gregory saw it in 1886.

Currently it is housed in the Iviron monastery (170 (19)), at Mount Athos.

== See also ==
- List of New Testament minuscules
- Biblical manuscript
- Textual criticism
