= Hematidrosis =

- Other names: Hematohidrosis, haematidrosis, hemidrosis, blood sweat
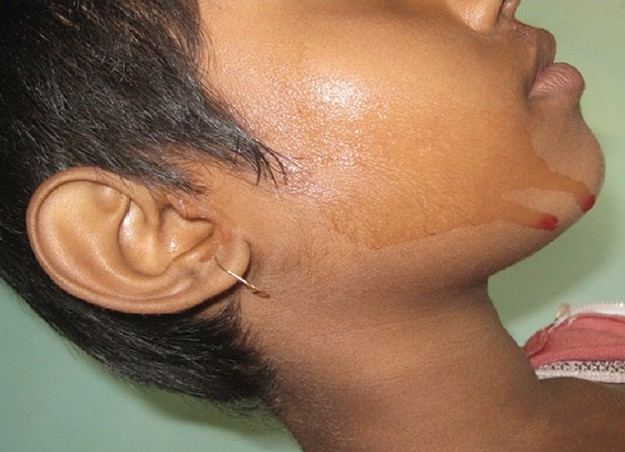
- Red-tinted sweat (or "blood sweat") caused by hematohidrosis
- Specialty: Dermatology

Hematidrosis, also called hematohidrosis, haematidrosis, hemidrosis and blood sweat, is a very rare condition in which a human sweats blood. The term is from Greek haîma/haímatos (αἷμα/αἵματος), meaning blood, and hīdrṓs (ἱδρώς), meaning sweat.

== Signs and symptoms ==
Blood usually oozes from the forehead, nails, umbilicus, and other skin surfaces. In addition, oozing from mucocutaneous surfaces causing nosebleeds, blood-stained tears, and vicarious menstruation are common. The episodes may be preceded by intense headache and abdominal pain and are usually self-limiting. In some conditions, the secreted fluid is more dilute and appears to be blood-tinged, while others may have more opaque, bright red secretions resembling blood.

While the extent of blood loss generally is minimal, hematidrosis also results in the skin becoming extremely tender and fragile.

== Causes ==
Hematidrosis is a condition in which capillary blood vessels that feed the sweat glands rupture, causing them to exude blood, occurring under conditions of extreme physical or emotional stress. Severe mental anxiety activates the sympathetic nervous system to invoke the fight-or-flight response to such a degree as to cause hemorrhage of the vessels supplying the sweat glands. It has been suggested that acute fear and extreme stress can cause hematidrosis.

== Diagnosis ==
Investigations such as platelet count, platelet aggregation test, coagulation profile, and skin biopsy reveal no abnormalities, and direct light microscopy of fluid demonstrates presence of normal red blood cells. Investigations also fail to show any vasculitis or skin appendages (i.e. sweat glands, sebaceous glands and hair follicles) abnormalities.

A 2015 case study investigated hematidrosis with a patient who has epilepsy.

== Treatment ==
Effects on the body include weakness and mild-to-moderate dehydration from the severe anxiety and both blood and sweat loss.

The condition is very rare, but there are reports in the medical literature of successful treatment with beta blockers (propranolol 10 mg), with significant reduction in the frequency of spontaneous blood oozing. The successful use of beta blockers supports the theory that the condition is induced by stress and anxiety. However, this etiology is not yet fully established, as the high prevalence of stress and anxiety in the modern era has not changed the incidence of this extremely rare disease, suggesting that other co-abnormalities also play a key role. Atropine sulfate transdermal patches have also been used successfully.

Favorable results with psychiatric counselling to reduce stress highlight the relationship between psychogenic causes and hematohidrosis.

== Instances ==
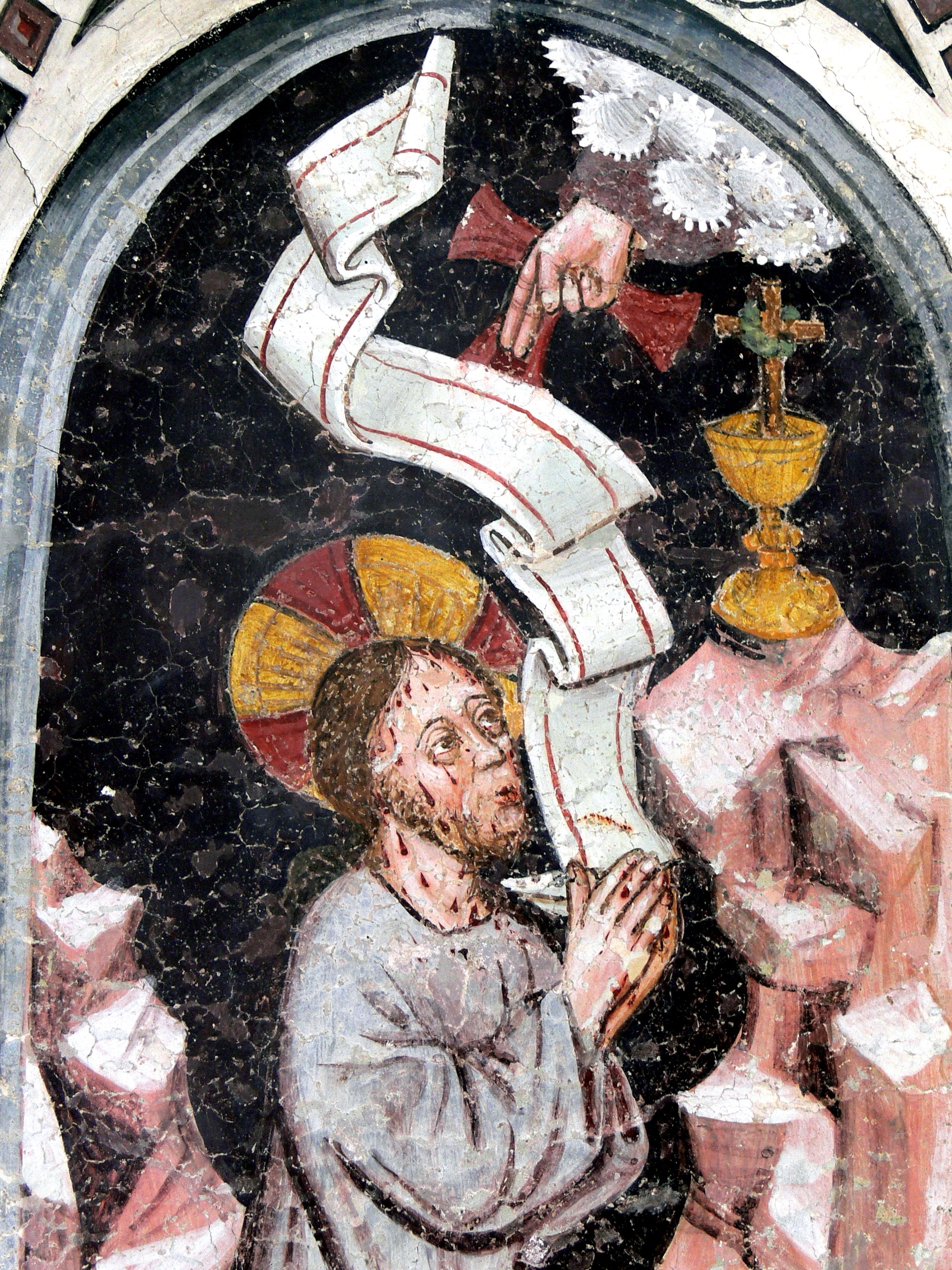
Jesus on the Mount of Olives

Dermatological research notes the presence of hematidrosis in people awaiting execution. It has also been proposed as a possible explanation for Jesus' agony in the garden of Gethsemane (Luke 22:44), and for claims associated with stigmata.

Leonardo da Vinci described a soldier who sweated blood before battle. The phenomenon has also been observed in individuals in fear for their lives; a case occurred during the London Blitz, and a case of fear of a storm while sailing, etc. Prisoners awaiting execution have been recorded to have sweat blood several times throughout history. This includes one instance where Paul Zacchias described a young man from Belgium in 1628 sweating blood after being condemned to death.

== See also ==
- Haemolacria – blood in tears
- Hyperhidrosis
