= Minuscule 711 =

- New Testament manuscript
- Text: Gospels †
- Date: 11th century
- Script: Greek
- Found: 1878
- Now at: Bodleian Library
- Size: 19.7 cm by 15.1 cm
- Type: Byzantine text-type
- Category: V
- Note: K^{x}

Minuscule 711 (in the Gregory-Aland numbering), ε1179 (von Soden), is a Greek minuscule manuscript of the New Testament, on parchment. Palaeographically it has been assigned to the 11th century. The manuscript is lacunose. Scrivener labelled it as 617^{e}.

== Description ==
The codex contains the text of the four Gospels on 236 parchment leaves (size 19.7 cm by 15.1 cm), with numerous lacunae.

Lacunae

Matthew 1:1-14). 17-20; 1:24-2:2; 28:15-20; Mark 1:6.7; Luke 1:6.7; 8:25-37; 24:30-53; John 1:1-3.9-14; 18:23-21:25.

The text is written in one column per page, 22-23 lines per page, in gold letters.

It contains the tables of the κεφαλαια before each Gospel. The text is divided according to the Ammonian Sections (in Mark 233 Sections, the last section in 16:8), whose numbers are given at the margin, with references to the Eusebian Canons. It contains lectionary markings, Synaxarion, and Menologion. The original manuscript contained pictures. They were cut out.

== Text ==
The Greek text of the codex is a representative of the Byzantine text-type. Hermann von Soden classified it to the textual family K^{1}. Kurt Aland placed it in Category V.

According to the Claremont Profile Method it represents textual family K^{x} in Luke 1, Luke 10, and Luke 20.

The texts of Matthew 16:2b–3 and John 5:4 are marked by an obelus.

== History ==
Scrivener and Gregory dated the manuscript to the 11th or 12th century. Currently the manuscript is dated by the INTF to the 11th century.

The manuscript was brought by John Hext from Corfu in 1878, and given by him to Daniel Parsons, who gave it to the college as a "join gift".

It was added to the list of New Testament manuscripts by Scrivener (617) and Gregory (711). Gregory saw the manuscript in 1883.

At present the manuscript is housed at the Bodleian Library (Oriel College, Ms. 83) in Oxford.

== See also ==
- List of New Testament minuscules
- Biblical manuscript
- Textual criticism
