= Minuscule 39 =

- New Testament manuscript
- Text: Gospels
- Date: 11th century
- Script: Greek
- Now at: Bibliothèque nationale de France
- Size: 33.5 cm by 26 cm
- Type: Byzantine text-type
- Category: V
- Note: marginalia

Minuscule 39 (in the Gregory-Aland numbering), A^{140} (Von Soden), is a Greek minuscule manuscript of the New Testament, written on vellum. Palaeographically it has been assigned to the 11th century. It has complex contents and some marginalia.

== Description ==
The codex contains a complete text of the four Gospels on 288 parchment leaves (33.5 cm by 26 cm). Gospels of Matthew and Mark were written by different hands.

The text is divided according to the κεφαλαια (chapters), whose numerals are given at the margin, with the τιτλοι (titles of chapters) at the top of the pages. There is also a division according to the smaller Ammonian Sections (in Mark 241, the last section in 16:20).

It contains lists of the κεφαλαια (tables of contents), and subscriptions at the end of each Gospel, with numbers of στιχοι. It has a commentary, in Mark commentary of Victorinus, from the same original as in codex 34.

It does not contains the texts of Matthew 16:2b–3 and the Pericope Adulterae (John 7:53-8:11).

== Text ==
The Greek text of the codex is a representative of the Byzantine text-type. Aland placed it in Category V. It was not examined by using the Claremont Profile Method.

== History ==
The manuscript was written in Constantinople by the Patriarch Sergius II (999–1019), in the beginning of the 11th century. In 1218 it was brought by monk Makarius to the Athos.

It was examined and described by Scholz, Burgon, and Paulin Martin.

The manuscript was added to the list of the New Testament manuscripts by Wettstein. C. R. Gregory saw the manuscript in 1885.

It is currently housed at the Bibliothèque nationale de France (Coislin Gr. 23) at Paris.

== See also ==
- List of New Testament minuscules
- Biblical manuscripts
- Textual criticism
