= Minuscule 261 =

- New Testament manuscript
- Text: Gospels
- Date: 12th century
- Script: Greek
- Now at: National Library of France
- Size: 28.1 cm by 22.7 cm
- Type: Byzantine text-type
- Category: V
- Note: full marginalia

Minuscule 261 (in the Gregory-Aland numbering), ε 282 (Soden), is a Greek minuscule manuscript of the New Testament, on parchment. Palaeographically it has been assigned to the 12th century. It has full marginalia.

== Description ==
The codex contains the text of the four Gospels on 175 parchment leaves (28.1 cm by 22.7 cm), with some lacunae (Matthew 1:1–11:1; 14:25–19:21; Luke 24:39–53; John 20:15–21:19). The first 28 leaves are paper.

The text is divided according to the κεφαλαια (chapters), whose numbers are given at the margin, and their τιτλοι (titles of chapters) at the top of the pages. There is also another division according to the Ammonian Sections (in Mark 241, the last in 16:20), but without references to the Eusebian Canons.

It contains tables of the κεφαλαια (tables of contents) before each Gospel, lectionary markings at the margin (for liturgical reading), αναγνωσεις (lessons), and subscriptions at the end of each Gospel (later hand), with numbers of στιχοι. It is correctly written. Lacuna at Matthew 1:1–11:1 was supplied by a later hand in the 14th century on a paper.

== Text ==
The Greek text of the codex is a representative of the Byzantine text-type. Hermann von Soden classified it to the textual family K^{1}. Aland placed it in Category V.

According to the Claremont Profile Method it represents textual family K^{x} in Luke 1 and Luke 20. In Luke 10 no profile was made.

== History ==
At the end of the codex is written: το παρον Βιβλιον υπαρχον της αγιοτατης μετροπολεως ξανθης του τιμιου προδρομου, και οστε βουληθη αποξενοσαι τουτο εκ του μοναστηριου ταυτης να εχη τας αρας των τιη θεοφορων πατερων λ.

The manuscript was held at the monastery of the Prodromous (Forerunner) at Constantinople. The manuscripts was added to the list of New Testament manuscripts by Johann Martin Augustin Scholz (1794-1852). C. R. Gregory saw the manuscript in 1884.

The manuscript is currently housed at the Bibliothèque nationale de France (Gr. 52) at Paris.

== See also ==
- Biblical manuscript
- List of New Testament minuscules
- Textual criticism
