= Minuscule 509 =

- New Testament manuscript
- Text: Gospels
- Date: 12th century
- Script: Greek
- Found: 1727
- Now at: Christ Church, Oxford
- Size: 30.2 cm by 22.2 cm
- Type: Byzantine text-type
- Category: V

Minuscule 509 (in the Gregory-Aland numbering), ε 258 (in the Soden numbering), is a Greek minuscule manuscript of the New Testament, on parchment. Palaeographically it has been assigned to the 12th century. Scrivener labeled it by number 495.

== Description ==
The codex contains the complete text of the four Gospels on 229 parchment leaves (size 30.2 cm by 22.2 cm). One leaf (John 19:13-29), and another containing John 21:24.25, are in duplicate at the beginning (prima manu).

The text is written in one column per page, 24 lines per page. The text is divided according to the κεφαλαια (chapters), whose numbers of at the margin and the τιτλοι (titles of chapters) at the top of the pages. There is also a division according to the Ammonian Sections (in Mark 241 sections, last section ended in 16:20), with references to the Eusebian Canons (in gold).

It contains the Eusebian Canon tables, prolegomena, tables of the κεφαλαια (tables of contents) are placed before each Gospel, and pictures.

== Text ==
The Greek text of the codex is a representative of the Byzantine text-type. Hermann von Soden included it to the textual family K^{1}. Aland placed it in Category V.

According to the Claremont Profile Method it represents textual family K^{x} in Luke 1 and Luke 20. In Luke 10 no profile was made.

== History ==
The manuscript was dated by Gregory to the 12th century.

In 1727 the manuscript came from the Pantokratoros monastery to England and was presented to archbishop of Canterbury, William Wake, together with minuscules 73, 74, 506-520. Wake presented it to Christ Church in Oxford. In 1732 John Walker slightly collated it for Bentley.

The manuscript was added to the list of New Testament minuscule manuscripts by F. H. A. Scrivener (495) and C. R. Gregory (509). Gregory saw it in 1883.

It is currently housed at Christ Church (Wake 24) in Oxford.

== See also ==
- List of New Testament minuscules
- Biblical manuscript
- Textual criticism
