= Minuscule 905 =

- New Testament manuscript
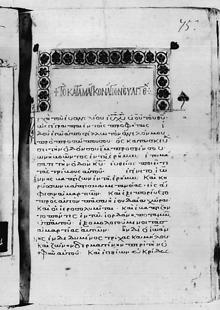
- Folio 75 recto, the beginning of Mark
- Text: Gospels
- Date: 12th/13th century
- Script: Greek
- Now at: Princeton University Library
- Size: 28.5 cm by 19 cm
- Type: Byzantine text-type
- Category: V
- Note: marginalia

Minuscule 905 (in the Gregory-Aland numbering), ε1130 (von Soden), is a 12th or 13th-century Greek minuscule manuscript of the New Testament on parchment. The manuscript has survived in complete condition. It has liturgical books and marginalia.

== Description ==
The codex contains the text of the four Gospels on 224 parchment leaves (size 28.5 cm by 19 cm). The text is written in one column per page, 28 lines per page. At the beginning (folios 1-2) and the end (last folio) it has additional non-biblical material. According to Hermann von Soden it is an ornamented manuscript.

The text is divided according to chapters (κεφαλαια), whose numbers are given at the margin, and their titles (τιτλοι) at the top of the pages. There is also another division according to the smaller Ammonian Sections (in Mark 234 Sections), with references to the Eusebian Canons (written below Ammonian Section numbers).

It also contains prolegomena, lectionary markings at the margin (for liturgical use), subscriptions at the end of each of the Gospels, and pictures. It contains also liturgical books with hagiographies: Synaxarion and Menologion.

== Text ==
The Greek text of the codex is a representative of the Byzantine text-type. Hermann von Soden included it to the textual family K^{ak}. Kurt Aland placed it in Category V.

According to the Claremont Profile Method it represents the textual family K^{x} in Luke 1 and Luke 20, but no profile was made for Luke 10. It forms a textual cluster with codex 1179.

It contains the spurious text of Matthew 16:2b–3 (Signs of the times), but marked with an obelus as doubtful.

== History ==
C. R. Gregory dated the manuscript to the 11th century. Currently the manuscript is dated by the INTF to the 11th century. Probably it was written in Calabria. Formerly it was at the Athos monastery (A'; according to Lake – Andrea 3).

The manuscript was added to the list of New Testament manuscripts by Scrivener (689^{e}) and Gregory (905^{e}). C. R. Gregory saw it in 1886.

The manuscript was described by Kenneth W. Clark.

Currently it is housed in the Princeton University Library (Garrett 5), in the United States.

== See also ==
- List of New Testament minuscules
- Minuscule 906
- Biblical manuscript
- Textual criticism
