= Minuscule 445 =

- New Testament manuscript
- Text: Gospels
- Date: 1506
- Script: Greek
- Now at: British Library
- Size: 20.9 cm by 15 cm
- Type: Byzantine text-type
- Category: V
- Note: marginalia

Minuscule 445 (in the Gregory-Aland numbering), ε 603 (in the Soden numbering), is a Greek minuscule manuscript of the New Testament, on paper. It is dated by a colophon to the year 1506. It has marginalia.

== Description ==
The codex contains a complete text of the four Gospels on 194 paper leaves (20.9 cm by 15 cm). It is written in one column per page, in 24 lines per page.

The text is divided according to the κεφαλαια (chapters), whose numbers are given at the margin, with their τιτλοι (titles) at the top of the pages. There is also a division according to the smaller Ammonian Sections (in Mark 241, 16:20). It has no references to the Eusebian Canons (written below Ammonian Section numbers).

It contains lectionary markings at the margin and incipits.

== Text ==
The Greek text of the codex is a representative of the Byzantine text-type. Aland placed it in Category V. It was not examined by Claremont Profile Method.

The text of the Matthew 16:2b–3 and Pericope Adulterae (John 7:53-8:11) are omitted.

== History ==
According to the colophon the manuscript was written in 1506, by hand Antonii eparchi. It once belonged to the Jesuit's Colleague, in Augen, on the Garonne. It was sold to Edward Harley on 28 July 1725. After his death it was bought for British Museum in 1753.

The manuscript was added to the list of New Testament manuscripts by Scholz (1794-1852). Scholz examined only Mark 5. C. R. Gregory saw it in 1883.

It is currently housed at the British Library (Harley MS 5736).

== See also ==
- List of New Testament minuscules
- Biblical manuscript
- Textual criticism
