= Minuscule 852 =

- New Testament manuscript
- Text: Gospels
- Date: ca. 1300
- Script: Greek
- Now at: Vatican Library
- Size: 23.4 cm by 16.5 cm
- Type: Byzantine text-type
- Category: V
- Note: marginalia

Minuscule 852 (in the Gregory-Aland numbering), ε406 (von Soden), is a 14th-century Greek minuscule manuscript of the New Testament on parchment. The manuscript has not survived in complete condition.

== Description ==
The codex contains the text of the four Gospels on 165 parchment leaves (size 23.4 cm by 16.5 cm). The text is written in one column per page, 28 lines per page, with some lacunae in Matthew 28:18-20; Mark 1:1-21; Luke 1:1-22; John 1:1-27.

The text is divided according to chapters (κεφαλαια), whose numbers are given at the margin, and their titles (τιτλοι) at the top of the pages. There is also another division according to the smaller Ammonian Sections (in Mark 236 Sections, the last in 16:12), without references to the Eusebian Canons.

It also contains the Synaxarion and Menologion.

== Text ==
The Greek text of the codex is representative of the Byzantine text-type. Hermann von Soden included it in the textual family K^{x}. Kurt Aland placed the Greek text of the codex in Category V.

According to the Claremont Profile Method it represents the textual family K^{x} in Luke 1 and Luke 10. In Luke 20 the manuscript is defective, in Luke 1 the manuscript is fragmentary.

It lacks the text of Matthew 16:2b–3 (Signs of the times).

== History ==
C. R. Gregory dated the manuscript to the year ca. 1300. Currently the manuscript is dated by the INTF to the year ca. 1300. The name of scribe was Andreas, who copied it at the wish of one John.

The manuscript was added to the list of New Testament manuscripts by Scrivener (732^{e}) and Gregory (852^{e}). C. R. Gregory saw it in 1886.

The manuscript once belonged to Borgianus. Currently it is housed in the Vatican Library (Borg. gr. 9), in Rome.

== See also ==
- List of New Testament minuscules
- Biblical manuscript
- Textual criticism
