= Minuscule 277 =

- New Testament manuscript
- Text: Gospels
- Date: 11th century
- Script: Greek
- Now at: Bibliothèque nationale de France
- Size: 16.9 cm by 13 cm
- Type: Byzantine text-type
- Category: V
- Note: marginalia

Minuscule 277 (in the Gregory-Aland numbering), ε 166 (Soden), is a Greek minuscule manuscript of the New Testament, on parchment. Paleographically it has been assigned to the 11th century. It has marginalia.

== Description ==
The codex contains the text of the four Gospels on 261 parchment leaves (16.9 cm by 13 cm). The text is written in one column per page, in 22 lines per page.

The text is divided according to the κεφαλαια (chapters), whose numbers are given at the margin, and their τιτλοι (titles of chapters) at the top of the pages. There is also a division according to the Ammonian Sections (in Mark 234, the last section in 16:9), whose numbers are given at the margin with references to the Eusebian Canons.

It contains the Epistula ad Carpianum, Eusebian tables, tables of the κεφαλαια (tables of contents) before each Gospel, lectionary markings at the margin, subscriptions at the end of each Gospel, with numbers of στιχοι. Some portions (αναγνωσεις, Synaxarion, Menologion, and pictures) were supplied by a later hand.

== Text ==
The Greek text of the codex is a representative of the Byzantine text-type. Hermann von Soden classified it to the textual family K^{1}. Aland placed it in Category V.

According to the Claremont Profile Method it represents textual family K^{x} in Luke 1 and Luke 20, and belongs to the cluster Ω. In Luke 10 no profile was made.

== History ==
The manuscript was added to the list of New Testament manuscripts by Scholz (1794-1852). It was examined and described by Paulin Martin. C. R. Gregory saw the manuscript in 1885.

The manuscript is currently housed at the Bibliothèque nationale de France (Gr. 81 A) at Paris.

== See also ==
- List of New Testament minuscules
- Biblical manuscript
- Textual criticism
