= Minuscule 2427 =

- New Testament manuscript
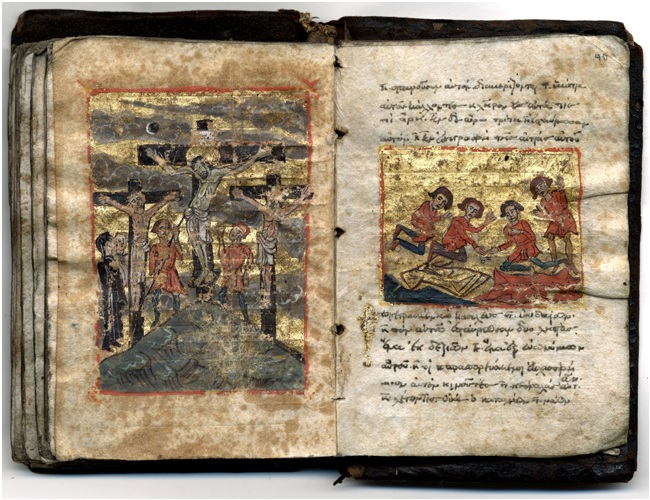
- Text: Gospel of Mark
- Date: alleged 13th, 19th
- Script: Greek
- Now at: University of Chicago Library
- Size: 11.5 x 8.5 cm
- Type: Alexandrian text-type
- Category: I

Codex 2427 (in the Gregory-Aland numbering), formerly known as Archaic Mark, is a miniature manuscript of the Gospel of Mark written in minuscule Greek. The manuscript had been very difficult to date paleographically and had been assigned to the 13th-18th century, until 2006 when it was proved a forgery following the publication of digital images of the codex, which had been made available online to renew interest in the manuscript.

The codex is written in a tiny minuscule hand on parchment leaves, containing 44 leaves (11.5 cm by 8.5 cm), written in one column per page, 21-25 lines per page. The codex has no sections, canons or headings, but it contains 16 colour illuminations. There are no indications on the codex that it was originally part of a tetraevangelium. The codex includes text of Mark 16:9-20.

The codex 2427 was found among the possessions of John Askitopoulos, an Athenian collector and dealer of antiquities, after his death in 1917. In 1937 the manuscript was sent to the University of Chicago Library, where it still resides (Ms. 972).

Illustrations are very similar to those from minuscule 777. Robert S. Nelson suggested that they were copied from 777.

== Archaic Mark ==
The text has some omissions (Mark 7:2-5, 8:11b, 13:28b-29, 10:29 is shorter). All these omissions have parallels in other Gospels, and for some scholars they look like non-interpolations, although they are not supported by any other manuscript.

Words before the bracket are the reading of NA^{27}, words after the bracket are the reading of the codex

Mark 1:3 Ησαια ] Ισαια
Mark 1:14 Γαλιλαιαν ] Γαλλιλαιαν
Mark 1:44 Μωυσης ] Μωησης
Mark 2:7 ει μη ] ει μι
Mark 2:22 οινον ωεον ] οινον παλαιον
Mark 2:25 Δαυιδ ] Δαυειδ
Mark 2:26 ιερεις ] αρχιερεις
Mark 3:17 Βοανεργες ] Βουανηργες
Mark 3:18 και Βαρθολομαιον ] [omitted]
Mark 3:32 και οι αδελφοι σου και αι αδελφοι σου εξω ζητουσιν σε ] [omitted]
Mark 5:1 εις το περαν της θαλασσης ] [omitted]
Mark 6:2 και γενομενου σαββατου ηρξατο διδασκειν εν τη συναγωγη ] [omitted]
Mark 7:2-5 τους αρτους – οι γαρ Φαρισαιοι… – και επερωτωσιν ] τους αρτους και επερωτωσιν
Mark 7:22 ασελγεια ] ασελγια
Mark 8:11 συζητειν αυτω, ζητουντες παρ’ αυτου σημειον απο του ουρανου, πειραζοντες ] συζητειν αυτω πειραζοντες
Mark 8:12 αμην λεγω υμιν, ει δοθησεται τη γενεα ταυτη σημειον ] [omitted]
Mark 9:33 ηλθον ] ηλθαν
Mark 9:43 εις την ζωην ] εν τη ζωη
Μark 10:22 ην γαρ εχων κτηματα πολλα ] ην γαρ πλουσιος
Mark 10:29 ος αφηκεν οικιαν… … και αγρους μετα διωγμων ] ος αφηκεν οικιαν η αδελφους η αδελφας η μητερα η πατηρα η αγρους μετα διωγμων
Mark 11:28 η τις σοι ] και τις σοι
Mark 13:28b-29 οτι εγγυς το θερος, εστιν ουτως και υμεις οταν ιδητε ταυτα γινομενα γινωσκετε οτι εγγυς εστιν επι θυραις ] οτι το θερος εγγυς εστιν επι θυραις
Mark 14:72 και αναμνησθη ο Πετρος το ρημα ] – [omitted]

The Greek text of the codex was a leading representative of the Alexandrian text-type. It was recognized by Ernest Cadman Colwell (1901-1974) as having an extraordinary degree of correspondence with the Codex Vaticanus. According to Colwell the codex preserved a "primitive text" of the Gospel of Mark. Text of the codex was highly esteemed by T. C. Skeat. Kurt Aland placed it in Category I. It was collated by M. M. Mitchell and P. A. Duncan in 2006.

== Forgery ==
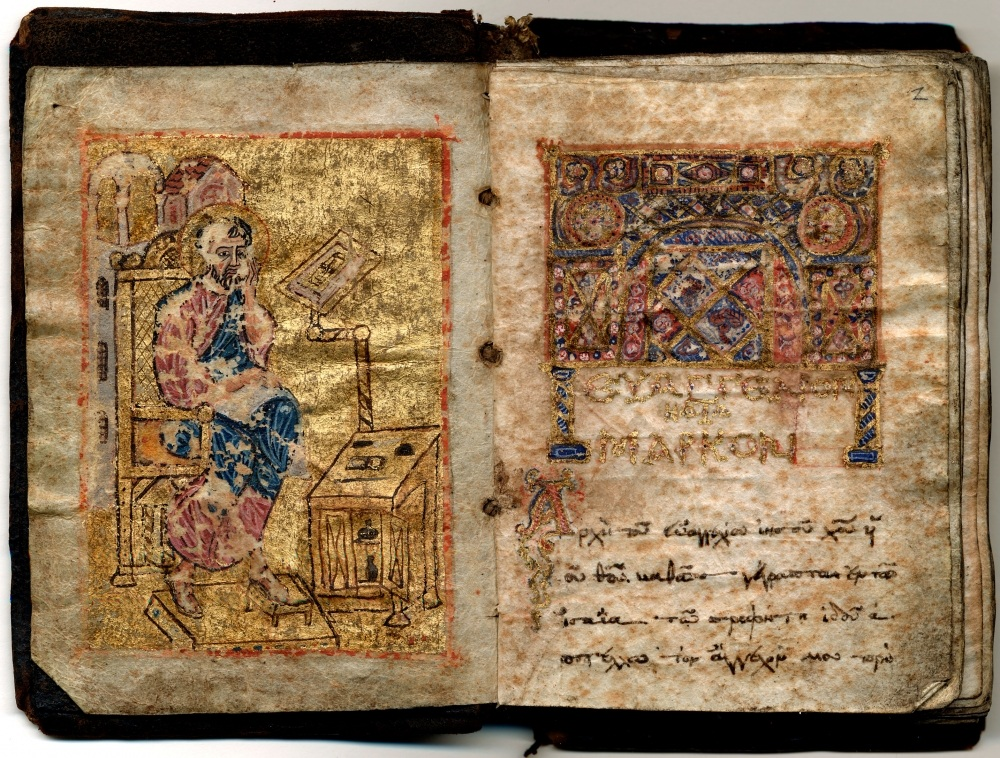
Portrait of Mark Evangelist and beginning of the Gospel

The manuscript found some early critics upon arriving in Chicago. Robert P. Casey "voiced his suspicion in 1947". In 1988 Mary V. Orna found that one of the illustrations contained Prussian blue (KFe[Fe(CN)_{6}]), produced since 1704 only. This did not resolve the question of authenticity, however, as it was "conceivable that the illuminations could have been retouched in a naïve attempt at restoration."

In early 2006 the University of Chicago announced that digital images of the manuscript had appeared online in an effort to "foster further research." By February Stephen Carlson had announced his findings that the codex was a forgery, and proved his case beyond a doubt at the 2006 Annual Meeting of the Society of Biblical Literature. Its text has been copied from Philipp Buttmann's 1860 Greek New Testament edition (based on Cardinal Mai's edition of Codex Vaticanus Graecus 1209). This is especially obvious since the forger also followed Buttmann in 81 out of 85 places where his edition departed from the Codex Vaticanus text. Furthermore, in three places the copyist of 2427 had accidentally omitted a line (6:2, 8:12, 14:14), and it transpired that in each verse the omitted text corresponds exactly to the lineation of Buttmann's edition.

Furthermore, microscopic, chemical and codicological testing eventually proved in 2009 that the manuscript had been made in 1874 at the earliest.

What made the text a forgery was that it was carefully manufactured in the style of a medieval codex, when it was in fact a very recent creation, no older than the late 19th century. What originally made scholars so suspicious was that it was textually the closest known manuscript – in fact, virtually identical – to Codex Vaticanus, but of a much later date. Furthermore, Greek codices of a single gospel are extremely unusual, further contributing to the suspicion that it was made as a souvenir.

== See also ==
- List of New Testament minuscules
