= Minuscule 500 =

- New Testament manuscript
- Text: Gospels †
- Date: 13th-century
- Script: Greek
- Found: 1849
- Now at: British Library
- Size: 20.6 cm by 14.8 cm
- Type: Byzantine text-type
- Category: V
- Note: full marginalia

Minuscule 500 is a Greek minuscule manuscript of the New Testament, made of parchment. It is designated by the siglum 500 in the Gregory-Aland numbering of New Testament manuscripts, and ε 323 in the von Soden numbering of New Testament manuscripts. Using the study of comparative writing styles (palaeography), it has been assigned to the 13th-century. The manuscript was adapted for liturgical use. It has some gaps.

== Description ==
The manuscript is a codex (precursor to the modern book format), containing the text of the four Gospels on 244 parchment leaves (sized 20.6 cm by 14.8 cm), with some missing sections: John 18:7-21; 19:40-21:25. The text is written in one column per page, 23 lines per page.

The text is divided according to the chapters (known as κεφαλαια / kephalaia), whose numbers are given in the margin, and their titles (known as τιτλοι / titloi) written at the top of the pages. There is also a division according to the Ammonian Sections (234 in Mark, the last in 16:9), but there are no references to the Eusebian Canons.

It contains the Epistle to Carpian, the tables of contents (also known as κεφαλαια) before each Gospel, lectionary markings in the margin (for liturgical use), αναγνωσεις, and subscriptions at the end of each Gospel.

It lacks the Eusebian tables but there is space for it. The Synaxarion and Menologion (liturgical books with hagiographies), were added by a later hand on paper.

== Text ==
The Greek text of the codex is considered to be a representative of the Byzantine text-type. Biblical scholar Hermann von Soden classified it to the textual family K^{1}. Biblical scholar Kurt Aland placed it in Category V of his New Testament Manuscripts classification system. Category V manuscripts are described as "manuscripts with a purely or predominantly Byzantine text."

According to the Claremont Profile Method (a specific analysis of textual data), it belongs to the textual family K^{x} in Luke 20. In Luke 1 and Luke 10 no profile was made because of illegible text.

== History ==
The earliest history of the manuscript is unknown. It was added to the list of New Testament manuscripts by biblical scholar Frederick H. A. Scrivener as number 587, which was updated by biblical scholar Caspar René Gregory as 500. It was examined by scholars Samuel T. Bloomfield, Scrivener, and Gregory. Gregory saw it in 1883.

It is currently dated by the INTF to the 13th-century. It is presently housed at the British Library (shelf number Add MS 17982) in London.

== See also ==
- Minuscule 501
- Minuscule 502
- List of New Testament minuscules
- Biblical manuscript
- Textual criticism
