= Minuscule 707 =

- New Testament manuscript
- Text: Gospels
- Date: 11th century
- Script: Greek
- Now at: Bodleian Library
- Size: 25.5 cm by 19 cm
- Type: Byzantine text-type
- Category: none

Minuscule 707 (in the Gregory-Aland numbering), ε152 (von Soden), is a Greek minuscule manuscript of the New Testament, on parchment. Palaeographically it has been assigned to the 11th century. The manuscript is lacunose. Scrivener labelled it by 606^{e}.

== Description ==
The codex contains the text of the four Gospels on 150 parchment leaves (size 25.5 cm by 19 cm), with only one small lacuna in Mark 16:19-20 (after και).

The text is written in one column per page, 27 lines per page. It has ornamental headpieces and decorated initials.

The text is divided according to the κεφαλαια, which numbers are given the left margin, and their τιτλοι at the top; there is also a division according to the Ammonian Sections (Mark 233, 16:8), with a references to the Eusebian Canons. It contains subscriptions (to Matthew), and pictures. It has a few lectionary markings on the margin added by a later hand.

According to Scrivener it has "a very unusual style".

== Text ==
The Greek text of the codex is a representative of the Byzantine text-type. Hermann von Soden classified it to the textual family K^{x}. Kurt Aland placed it in Category V.

According to the Claremont Profile Method it represents mixed Byzantine text, related to the textual family K^{x} in Luke 1 and Luke 20. In Luke 10 no profile was made.

The texts of Matthew 16:2b–3, John 5:3.4, Pericope Adulterae (John 8:3-8:11) are marked with an obelus.

== History ==
Scrivener and Gregory dated the manuscript to the 11th century. Currently the manuscript is dated by the INTF to the 11th century.

The manuscript was formerly held in Constantinople, where it was bought in 1882.

It was added to the list of New Testament manuscript by Scrivener (606) and Gregory (707). Gregory saw the manuscript in 1883.

The manuscript is now housed at the Bodleian Library (MS. Auct. T. inf. 2. 6) in Oxford.

== See also ==
- List of New Testament minuscules
- Biblical manuscript
- Textual criticism
