= Minuscule 272 =

- New Testament manuscript
- Text: Gospels
- Date: 11th century
- Script: Greek
- Now at: British Library
- Size: 14.3 cm by 12.5 cm
- Type: Byzantine text-type
- Category: V
- Note: marginalia

Minuscule 272 (in the Gregory-Aland numbering), ε 1182 (Soden), is a Greek minuscule manuscript of the New Testament, on parchment. Palaeographically it has been assigned to the 11th century. It has marginalia.

== Description ==
The codex contains the text of the four Gospels on 218 parchment leaves (14.3 cm by 12.5 cm). The text is written in one column per page, in 21 lines per page.

The text is divided according to the κεφαλαια (chapters), whose numbers are given at the margin, and their τιτλοι (titles of chapters) at the top of the pages. There is also a division according to the Ammonian Sections, with references to the Eusebian Canons (mostly omitted).

It contains the Epistula ad Carpianum, Eusebian Canon tables, tables of the κεφαλαια (tables of contents) before each Gospel, Synaxarion, Menologion, and subscriptions at the end of each Gospel.

== Text ==
The Greek text of the codex is a representative of the Byzantine text-type. Hermann von Soden classified it to the textual family K^{1}. Aland placed it in Category V. According to the Claremont Profile Method in Luke 1 and Luke 20 it belongs to the textual family K^{x}. It creates textual pair with 419

Passage of Matthew 16:2b–3 (signs of the times) is excluded.

== History ==
The manuscript once belonged to Melchisedek Thevenot († 1692), then it was held at the Bibliothèque nationale de France (Gr. 76). Thomas Rodd († 1822), librarian, purchased it for the British Museum.

The manuscripts was added to the list of New Testament manuscripts by Scholz (1794–1852). C. R. Gregory saw the manuscript in 1883.

The manuscript is currently housed at the British Library (Add MS 15581) in London.

== See also ==
- List of New Testament minuscules
- Biblical manuscript
- Textual criticism
