= Minuscule 151 =

Coordinates: 41°54′17.1″N 12°27′16.6″E

- New Testament manuscript
- Text: Gospels
- Date: 10th century
- Script: Greek
- Now at: Vatican Library
- Size: 24.5 cm by 12.5 cm
- Type: Byzantine text-type
- Category: V
- Note: some rare readings marginalia

Minuscule 151 (in the Gregory-Aland numbering), A^{17} (Soden), is a Greek minuscule manuscript of the New Testament, on parchment leaves. Palaeographically it has been assigned to the 10th century. The manuscript has complex contents. It has marginalia.

== Description ==
The codex contains a complete text of the four Gospels on 224 parchment leaves (size 24.5 cm by 12.5 cm) with a commentary.

The text is written in one column per page, in 28 lines per page. Ink is black, the capital letters in colour and gold.

The text is divided according to the κεφαλαια (chapters), whose numbers are given at the margin of the text, and their τιτλοι (titles of chapters) at the top of the pages. There is also another division according to the smaller Ammonian Sections (in Mark 241, last numbered section in 16:20), without references to the Eusebian Canons (written below Ammonian Section numbers).

It contains the Epistula ad Carpianum, Eusebian Canon tables, tables of the κεφαλαια (tables of contents) are given before each Gospel, pictures, and scholia in the margin, Menologion, stichoi, and pictures. Hebrew words explained at the beginning.

== Text ==
The Greek text of the codex is a representative of the Byzantine text-type. Aland placed it in Category V. According to the Claremont Profile Method it represents the textual family K^{x} in Luke 1, Luke 10, and Luke 20. It belongs to the textual cluster Ω.

The spurious texts of Matthew 16:2b–3 (signs of the times) and the Pericope Adulterae (John 7:53-8:11) are omitted.

It contains some rare readings (e.g. John 19:14).

== History ==
Birch and Scrivener dated it to the 11th century. Currently it is dated by the INTF to the 10th century.

It was examined by Birch (about 1782) and Scholz. C. R. Gregory saw it in 1886.

Text of Mark 16:8-20 of the codex was used by Cardinal Angelo Mai in his edition of the text of Codex Vaticanus Graecus 1209 ("pseudo-facsimile" published posthumously in 1857).

It is currently housed at the Vatican Library (Pal. gr. 220), at Rome.

== See also ==
- List of New Testament minuscules
- Biblical manuscript
- Textual criticism
