= Minuscule 194 =

11th-century Greek New Testament manuscript

- New Testament manuscript
- Text: Gospels
- Date: 11th century
- Script: Greek
- Now at: Laurentian Library
- Size: 30.1 cm by 24.6 cm
- Type: Byzantine text-type
- Category: V
- Note: marginalia

Minuscule 194 (in the Gregory-Aland numbering), A^{130} (Soden), is a Greek minuscule manuscript of the New Testament, on parchment. Paleographically it has been assigned to the 11th century. It has marginalia.

== Description ==
The codex contains almost complete text of the four Gospels, with a commentary, on 263 thick parchment leaves (size 30.1 cm by 24.6 cm). The 6th folio was supplied by later hand.

The text is written in one column per page, biblical text in 25 lines per page, and commentary text in 46 lines per page. The biblical text is surrounded by a catena (Victor's on St. Mark). Text of Matthew begins in 3:7. Catena is similar to that of 34.

The text is divided according to the κεφαλαια (chapters), whose numbers are given at the margin. There is also a division according to the Ammonian Sections (in Mark 241 Sections, the last in 16:20) (no references to the Eusebian Canons).

It contains subscriptions at the end of each Gospel, with numbers of στιχοι, and pictures.

== Text ==
The Greek text of the codex is a representative of the Byzantine text-type. Aland placed it in Category V.

It was not examined by the Claremont Profile Method.

It lacks the text of Matthew 16:2b–3 (signs of the times).

== History ==
It was examined by Birch, Scholz, and Burgon. C. R. Gregory saw it in 1886.

It is currently housed at the Laurentian Library (Plutei. VI. 33), in Florence, Italy.

== See also ==
- List of New Testament minuscules
- Biblical manuscript
- Textual criticism
