= Minuscule 44 =

- New Testament manuscript
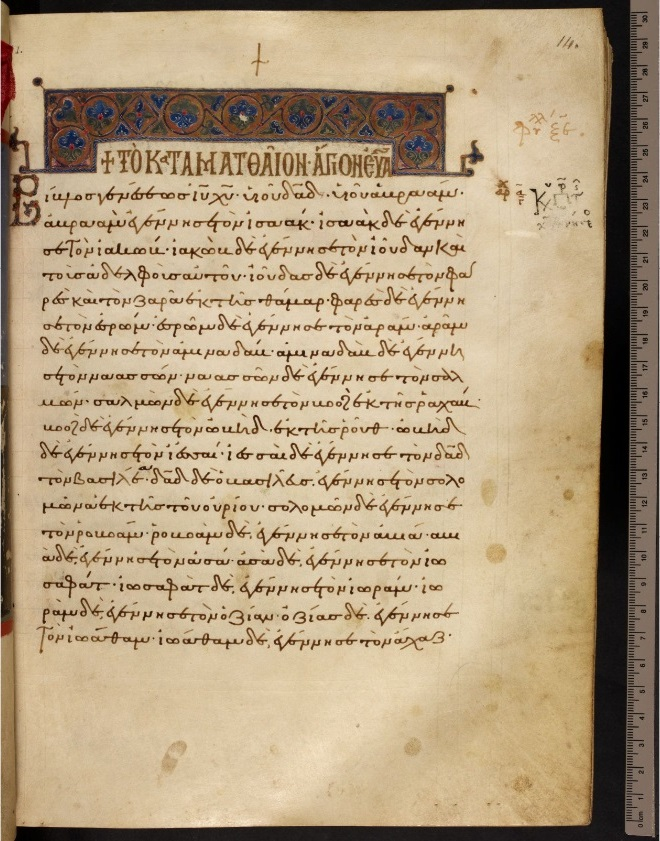
- The beginning of the Gospel of Matthew
- Text: Gospels
- Date: 12th century
- Script: Greek
- Found: 1760-1770, Athos
- Now at: British Library
- Size: 30.7 cm by 24 cm
- Type: Byzantine text-type
- Category: V
- Note: marginalia

Minuscule 44 (in the Gregory-Aland numbering), ε 239 (von Soden), is a Greek minuscule manuscript of the New Testament, on parchment leaves. Palaeographically it has been assigned to the 12th century. It has complex contents and full marginalia.

== Description ==
The codex contains complete text of the four Gospels on 259 leaves with size 30.7 cm by 24 cm. The text is written in one column per page, 21-22 lines per page. In Gospel of Matthew verses 16:2b-3 (signs of the times) are omitted.

The text is divided according to the κεφαλαια (chapters), whose numbers are given at the margin, and their τιτλοι (titles of chapters) at the top of the pages. There is also another division according to the smaller Ammonian Sections (in Mark 234 sections, the last numbered section in 16:9), with references to the Eusebian Canons.

It contains liturgical books with hagiographies (synaxaria and Menologion), pictures, lectionary markings at the margin (for liturgical use), subscriptions at the end of the Gospels, and numbers of στιχοι.

== Text ==
The Greek text of the codex is a representative of the Byzantine text-type. Hermann von Soden classified it to the textual family Family E. Aland placed it in Category V.

According to the Claremont Profile Method it represents textual family K^{x} in Luke 1, Luke 10, and Luke 20. It belongs to the textual cluster 1434 in Luke 20. It does not contain Jesus and the woman taken in adultery (John 7:53-8:11).

Textual variants
Matt 2,1 – Ἰεροσόλυμα ] Ἰερουσαλήμ
Matt 2,11 – εὗρον ] εἶδον
Matt 2,23 – Ναζαρέτ ] Ναζαρὰ

== History ==
The manuscript was dated by Scholz to the 11th century. Gregory dated it to the 12th century. Currently it has been assigned by the INTF to the 12th century.

The codex was brought from Athos to England by César de Missy (1703-1775), French chaplain of George III, King of England, who spent his life in collecting materials for an edition of the New Testament. It was examined by Amelotte, Simon, Wetstein in 1746, Scholz, and Bloomfield (1860). Wettstein gave a collation, but very imperfect.

It was added to the list of the New Testament manuscripts by Wettstein. C. R. Gregory saw it in 1883.

It is currently housed in at the British Library (Add MS 4949), at London.

== See also ==
- List of New Testament minuscules
- Biblical manuscript
- Textual criticism
