= Haemolacria =

- Other names: Blood tears, haemolacria, hemolacria,
- Specialty: Dermatology

Haemolacria or hemolacria is a physical condition that causes a person to produce tears that are partially composed of blood.

== Description ==
Haemolacria can manifest as tears ranging from merely red-tinged to appearing to be entirely made of blood, and may also be indicative of a tumor in the lacrimal apparatus. It is most often provoked by local factors such as bacterial conjunctivitis, environmental damage or injuries. On rare occasions, a nosebleed may result in bloody tears if the shed blood is forced to flow up and through the nasolacrimal ducts.

Acute haemolacria can occur in fertile women and seems to be induced by hormones, similarly to what happens in endometriosis.

== Cases ==
Twinkle Dwivedi
From Lucknow, India, Dwivedi presented a rare condition that appeared to cause her to spontaneously bleed from her eyes and other parts of her body without presenting any visible wounds. Dwivedi was the subject of numerous medical research studies and TV shows including Body Shock and a National Geographic documentary.
In the absence of a medical explanation for her condition, some religious explanations have been posed. It was suggested that she could have had an unknown disease, but more skeptical views hypothesized that the case might be explained by Münchausen syndrome by proxy, where her mother, seemingly the only one to witness her bleeding actually starting, was fabricating the story and somehow inducing the effect on the girl. Sanal Edamaruku observed in 2010 that the pattern seemed to match her menstrual cycle and believed that she was faking the symptoms.

Calvino Inman
Aged 22, reported to weep tears of blood 5 times a day.

Rashida Khatoon
From India, was reportedly crying blood up to five times a day in 2009, and fainting with every weeping.

Débora Santos
Age 17, from Brazil. Was reported to have cried tears of blood several times in her life.

Yaritza Oliva (not officially diagnosed)
Age 21, from Chile. Was reported to have cried tears of blood several times a day in 2013.

Linnie Ikeda (not officially diagnosed)
Age 25, from Waikele, Hawai'i, United States, on the island of Oʻahu. She was diagnosed after 2008 with Gardner–Diamond syndrome for her random bruising, but in 2010 had symptoms of the splitting of her tongue which would bleed profusely. In 2011, Ikeda has started bleeding from her eyes.

Marnie-Rae Harvey (not officially diagnosed)
Age 17, from the United Kingdom. Started in 2013 with initially coughing up blood but now persists in her tears since 2015.

Sakhina Khatun
From Bhagwangola, Murshidabad, West Bengal, India, was reportedly crying blood many times a day in 2019, and fainting with every weeping.

Vlad III (also known as Vlad the Impaler and Vlad Dracula) (not officially diagnosed)
Protein analysis of paper letters written by Vlad Dracula has revealed evidence suggesting haemolacria, consistent with stories from the last years of his life.

== In popular culture ==
French author the Marquis de Sade claimed to have "wept tears of blood" after he thought his novel The 120 Days of Sodom was thought to be lost in July 1789. However, the work was later recovered. It is unclear whether the Marquis actually suffered haemolacria, or whether he was using it as a figure of speech.

Le Chiffre, the main antagonist of the 2006 film Casino Royale, has haemolacria.

On the television series Manifest, Dr. Saanvi Bahl suffered from hemolacria and erratic blood pressure in the season 3 episode Bogey.

In the Afterbirth+ expansion of The Binding of Isaac: Rebirth, haemolacria is an unlockable passive item that causes tears to burst into smaller tears upon hitting a wall, obstacle or enemy and turns tears into blood tears.

A seemingly popular creepypasta, known as Squidward's Suicide or Red Mist, depicts the SpongeBob SquarePants character Squidward Tentacles suffering from this condition before committing suicide.

In Ziyarat al-Nahiya al-Muqaddasa attributed to Muhammad al-Mahdi it is stated about Mourning of Muharram that "If time delays me and destiny prevents me from helping and supporting you on the day of Ashura, I will certainly lament for you morning and evening, and I will weep blood for you instead of tears," which some consider it to be an allusion to the intensity of grief and mourning.

== See also ==
- Hematidrosis – blood in sweat
