= Minuscule 655 =

- New Testament manuscript
- Text: Gospels †
- Date: 11th / 12th century
- Script: Greek
- Now at: Berlin State Library
- Size: 24 cm by 19 cm
- Type: Byzantine text-type
- Category: V

Minuscule 655 (in the Gregory-Aland numbering), ε 177 (von Soden), is a Greek minuscule manuscript of the New Testament, on parchment. Palaeographically it has been assigned to the 12th century. The manuscript has complex contents. Scrivener labelled it by 635^{e}.

== Description ==
The codex contains the text of the four Gospels, on 324 parchment leaves (size 24 cm by 19 cm). The text is written in one column per page, 23 lines per page. It contains the Epistula ad Carpianum, the Eusebian tables, Prolegomena, lists of the κεφαλαια (before every Gospel). The text is divided according to the numbered κεφαλαια (chapters), with their τιτλοι (titles) at the top, and according to the Ammonian Sections (in Mark 241 Sections – the last in 16:19), with references to the Eusebian Canons. It contains also the Harmony at the foot, subscriptions at the end of books, stichoi, and pictures of Evangelists. It contains some notes of Clemens of Alexandria and John Chrysostom.

== Text ==
The Greek text of the codex is a representative of the Byzantine text-type. Hermann von Soden classified it as K^{1}, which according to him represents the earliest stage of the Byzantine text. Kurt Aland placed it in Category V. According to the Wisse's Profile Method it has mixed the Byzantine text in Luke 1 and Luke 10, and K^{x} text in Luke 20.

The texts of the Christ's agony (Luke 22:43-44), John 5:3-4, and the Pericope Adulterae (John 7:53-8:11) are marked with an obelus. It means the authenticity of these texts were doubtful for the scribe.

== History ==
Scrivener dated the manuscript to the 11th or 12th century, Gregory dated it to the 11th century. Currently the manuscript is dated by the INTF to the 11th or 12th century.

The manuscript was not cited in the editions of the Novum Testamentum Graece (UBS3/UBS4, NA26/NA27).

Formerly the manuscript was housed in Berlin (Königliche Bibliothek, Gr. quarto 39).

Currently the manuscript is housed at the Berlin State Library (Graec. quarto 39), in Berlin.

== See also ==
- List of New Testament minuscules
- Biblical manuscript
- Textual criticism
