= Minuscule 595 =

- New Testament manuscript
- Text: Gospels †
- Date: 16th century
- Script: Greek
- Now at: Biblioteca Marciana
- Size: 29 cm by 20 cm
- Type: ?
- Category: none

Minuscule 595 (in the Gregory-Aland numbering), ε 602 (von Soden), is a Greek minuscule manuscript of the New Testament, on paper. Palaeographically it has been assigned to the 16th century. The manuscript is lacunose. It was labelled by Scrivener as 468.

== Description ==
The codex contains the text of the four Gospels on 155 paper leaves (size 29 cm by 20 cm) with one lacunae (Matthew 1:1-5:44). The text is written in one column per page, 26 lines per page.

It contains the lists of the κεφαλαια (to John), Latin numbers of the κεφαλαια at the margin, the Ammonian Sections (only in Mark), (not the Eusebian Canons), lectionary markings, incipits, Synaxarion, subscriptions at the end of each Gospel, and στιχοι; αναγνωσεις (lessons) were added by a later hand.

== Text ==
The Greek text of the codex Aland did not place in any Category. It was not examined by using the Claremont Profile Method.

It lacks Matthew 16:2b–3 (Signs of the times).

== History ==
Formerly the manuscript was housed at the monastery St. Michael de Muriano Nr. 49 in Venice. The manuscript was described by Mittarelli (1708–1777), along with the codex 419.

The manuscript was added to the list of New Testament manuscripts by Scrivener. It was examined by Dean Burgon.

The manuscript currently is housed at the Biblioteca Marciana (Gr. I,56 (1324)), at Venice.

== See also ==
- List of New Testament minuscules
- Biblical manuscript
- Textual criticism
