= Minuscule 344 =

- New Testament manuscript
- Text: Gospels
- Date: 10th century
- Script: Greek
- Now at: Biblioteca Ambrosiana
- Cite: Scholz, Biblisch-kritische Reise (1823)
- Size: 16.4 cm by 12.1 cm
- Type: Byzantine text-type
- Category: V
- Note: marginalia

Minuscule 344 (in the Gregory-Aland numbering), ε 1007 (Soden), is a Greek minuscule manuscript of the New Testament, on parchment. Paleographically it has been assigned to the 10th century. It has marginalia.

== Description ==
The codex contains the text of the four Gospels on 327 parchment leaves (16.4 cm by 12.1 cm) with lacunae (Luke 13:21-16:23; 21:12-27; 22:12-23; 23:45-John 21:12). The lacking texts were supplied in the 16th century on paper. It is written in one column per page, in 19 lines per page.

The text is divided according to the κεφαλαια (chapters), whose numbers are given at the margin, with their τιτλοι (titles of chapters) at the top. There is also a division according to the Ammonian Sections (in Mark 237 Sections, the last in 16:14), without references to the Eusebian Canons (written below Ammonian Section numbers).

It contains the Epistula ad Carpianum (added later), tables of the κεφαλαια (tables of contents) before each Gospel, Synaxarion (later hand), and subscriptions at the end of each Gospel.

== Text ==
The Greek text of the codex is a representative of the Byzantine text-type. Aland placed it in Category V. According to the Claremont Profile Method it represents the textual family K^{x} in Luke 1 and Luke 20, and belongs to the textual cluster Ω. In Luke 10 no profile was made.

It does not contain the text of Matthew 16:2b–3 (signs of the times) and John 21:25.

== History ==
The manuscript was examined by Scholz (Matthew and John) and Burgon. It was added to the list of New Testament manuscripts by Scholz (1794-1852). C. R. Gregory saw it in 1886.

The manuscript is currently housed at the Biblioteca Ambrosiana (G. 16 sup.) in Milan.

== See also ==
- List of New Testament minuscules
- Biblical manuscript
- Textual criticism
