= Red sky at morning =

Natural atmospheric phenomenon

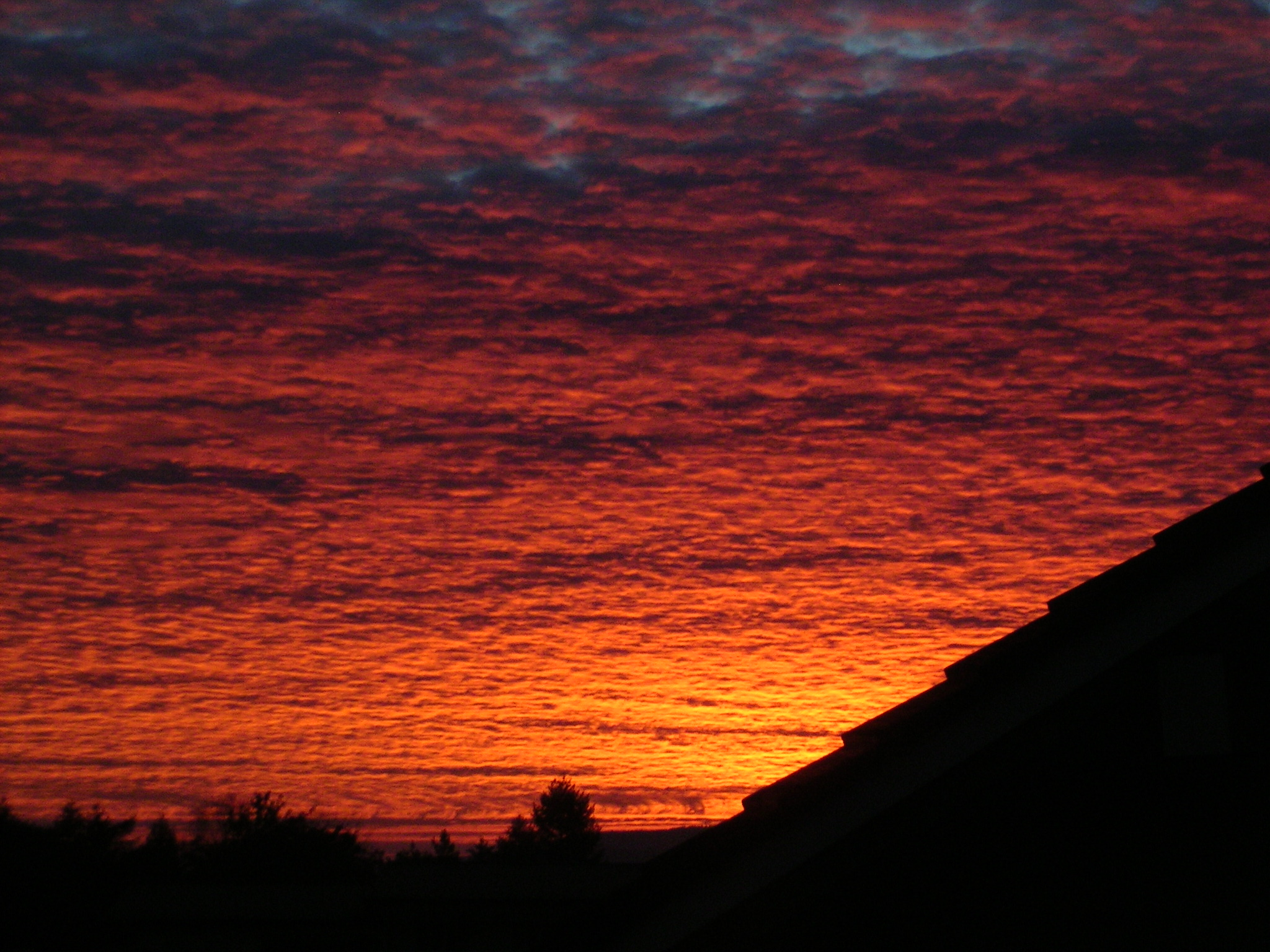
Red sky at morning, during sunrise

The common phrase "red sky at morning" is a line from an ancient rhyme often repeated with variants by mariners and others:

Red sky at night, sailors' delight.
Red sky at morning, sailors take warning.

The concept is over two thousand years old and is cited in the New Testament as established wisdom that prevailed among the Jews of the 1st century AD by Jesus in Matthew 16:2-3.

== Uses ==
The rhyme is a rule of thumb used for weather forecasting during the past two millennia. It is based on the reddish glow of the morning or evening sky, caused by trapped particles scattering the blue light from the sun in a stable air mass.

If the morning skies are of an orange-red glow, it signifies a high-pressure air mass with stable air trapping particles, like dust, which scatters the sun's blue light. This high pressure is moving towards the east, and a low-pressure system moves in from the west. Conversely, in order to see "red sky" in the evening, high-pressure air mass from the west scatters the blue light in the atmospheric particles, leaving the orange-red glow. High-pressure air mass signifies stable weather, while low pressure signifies unstable weather.

There are occasions where a storm system might rain itself out before reaching the observer (who had seen the morning red sky). For ships at sea, however, the wind and rough seas from an approaching storm system could still be a problem, even without rainfall.

Because of different prevailing wind patterns around the globe, the traditional rhyme is generally not correct at lower latitudes of both hemispheres, where prevailing winds are from east to west. The rhyme is generally correct at middle latitudes where, due to the rotation of the Earth, prevailing winds travel west to east.

== Other versions ==
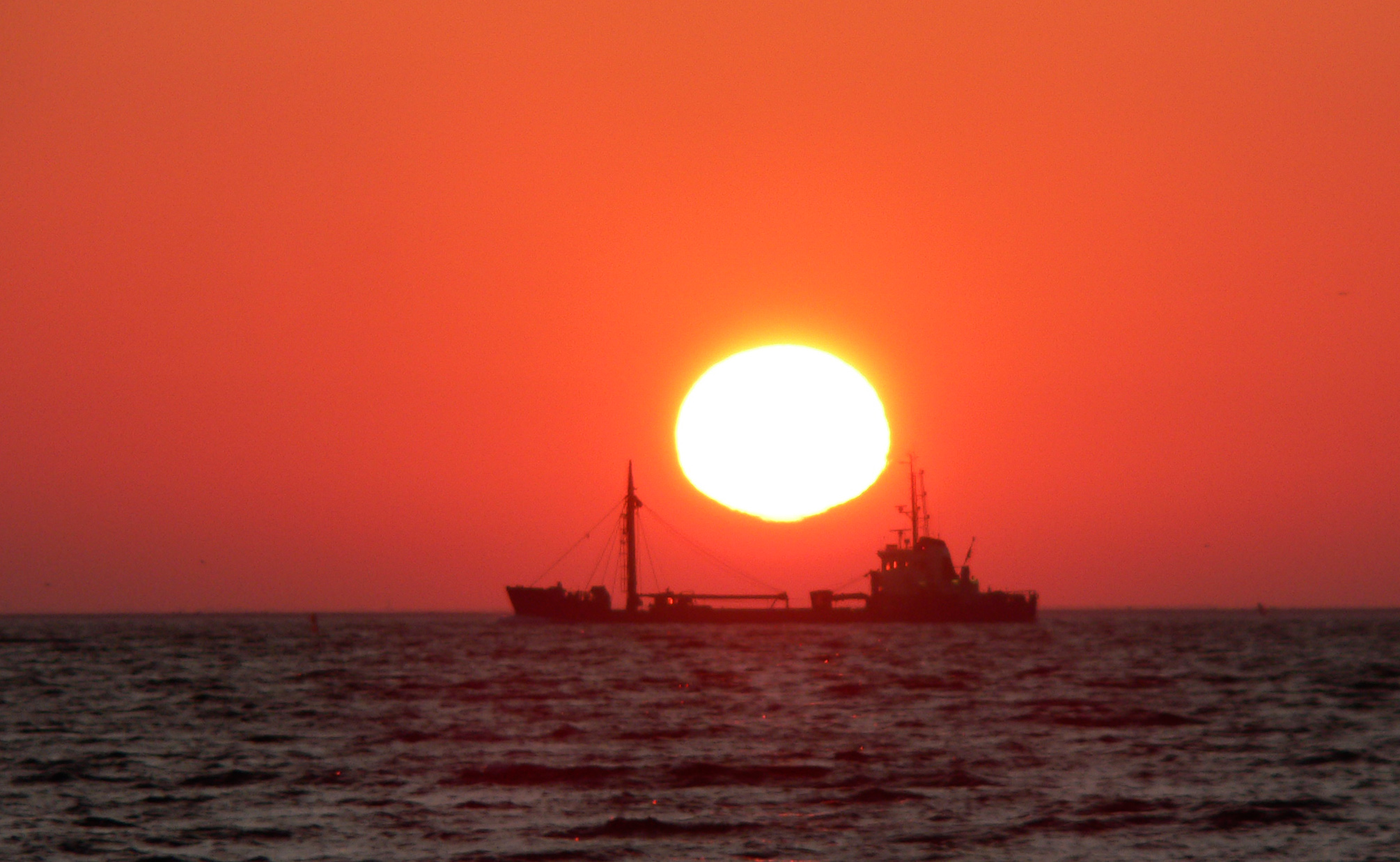
The sun rising over a ship off Copenhagen, 2006

There are variations of the phrase, some including the plural word "sailors":

Red sky at night, sailors' delight.
Red sky at morning, sailors' warning.

Another version uses the word "shepherds":

Red sky at night, shepherds' delight.
Red sky in the morning, shepherds' warning.

Another version uses "pink" in place of "red":

Pink sky at night, sailors' delight.
Pink sky in the morning, sailors take warning.

Another version uses "forlorn":

Red sky at night, sailors' delight.
Red sky in the morn, sailors forlorn.

In Matthew 16:2b–3, Jesus Christ says:

When it is evening, you say, "It will be fair weather; for the sky is red."
And in the morning, "It will be stormy today, for the sky is red and threatening."

== See also ==
- Diffraction
- Sunrise
- Sailors' superstitions
- Weather lore
