= Minuscule 539 =

- New Testament manuscript
- Text: Gospels †
- Date: 11th century
- Script: Greek
- Now at: University of Michigan
- Size: 17.3 cm by 12.5 cm
- Type: ?
- Category: none
- Note: marginalia

Minuscule 539 (in the Gregory-Aland numbering), ε 141 (in Soden's numbering), is a Greek minuscule manuscript of the New Testament, on parchment. Palaeographically it has been assigned to the 11th century. Scrivener labeled it by number 551. The manuscript is lacunose. It was adapted for liturgical use.

== Description ==
The codex contains a complete text of the four Gospels, on 173 parchment leaves (size 17.3 cm by 12.5 cm), with some lacunae (Matthew 1:1-17; Mark 1:1-14; 3:22-4:10; Luke 1:1-17; John 1:1-46). It is written in one column per page, 29 lines per page.

The text is divided according to the κεφαλαια (chapters), whose numerals are given at the margin, and the τιτλοι (titles of chapters) at the top of the pages. There is also a division according to the Ammonian Sections (in Mark 234 Sections, the last in 16:9), with references to the Eusebian Canons (written at the margin below Ammonian Section numbers).

It contains Lectionary markings at the margin (for liturgical use), tables of the κεφαλαια (tables of contents) before each Gospel (defective), and pictures.

== Text ==
The Greek text of the codex was not determine as the manuscript is not available. Aland did not place it in any Category.

It was not examined by the Claremont Profile Method.

It lacks the text of Matthew 16:2b–3 (signs of thetimes).

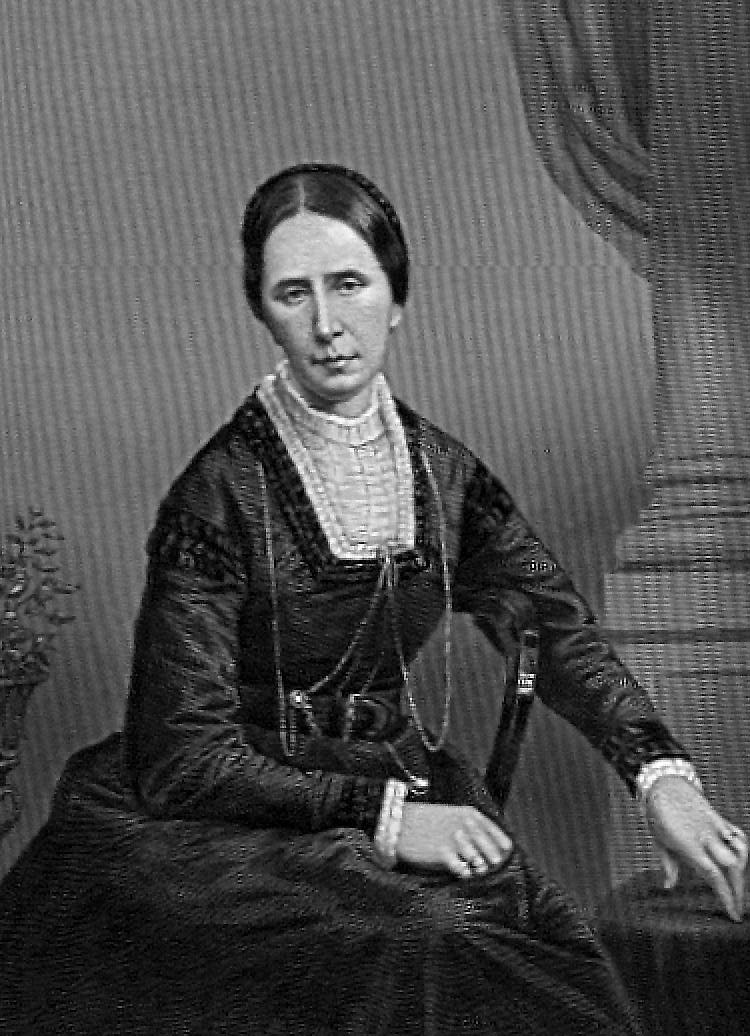
The Lady Burdett-Coutts

== History ==
In 1864 the manuscript was purchased from a dealer at Janina in Epeiros, by Baroness Burdett-Coutts (1814–1906), a philanthropist, together with other Greek manuscripts (among them codices 532-546). They were transported to England in 1870-1871.

The manuscript was presented by Burdett-Coutts to Sir Roger Cholmely's School, and was housed at the Highgate (Burdett-Coutts II. 23), in London. It was examined by Scrivener. It was in Sotheby's.

It was added to the list of the New Testament minuscule manuscripts by F. H. A. Scrivener (551) and C. R. Gregory (539). Gregory saw it in 1883.

The present location of the codex is unknown.

== See also ==
- List of New Testament minuscules
- Biblical manuscript
- Textual criticism
