= Matthew 16:2b–3 =

- ← 16:1 16:4 →
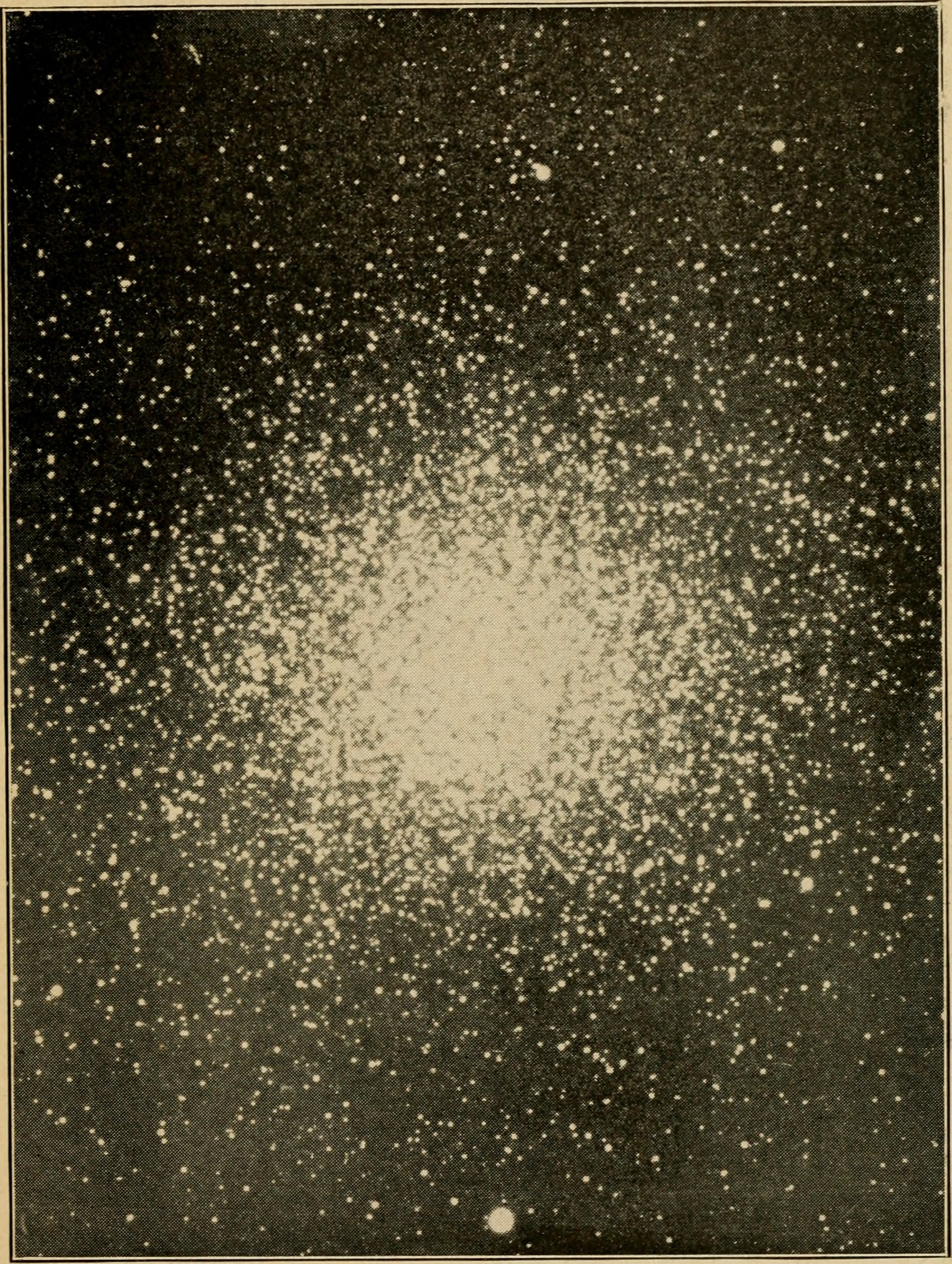
- Illustration from Astronomy and the Bible (1919) by Lucas Albert Reed.
- Book: Gospel of Matthew
- Christian Bible part: New Testament

Matthew 16:2b–3 (the signs of the times) is a passage within the second and third verses in the 16th chapter of the Gospel of Matthew in the New Testament. It describes a confrontation between Jesus and the Pharisees and Sadducees over their demand for a sign from heaven. It is one of several passages of the New Testament that are absent from many early manuscripts. The authenticity of the passage has been disputed by scholars since the second half of the 19th century.

== Text ==
Greek

Ὀψίας γενομένης λέγετε, Εὐδια, πυρράζει γὰρ ὁ οὐρανός καὶ πρωὶ, Σήμερον χειμών, πυρράζει γὰρ στυγνάζων ὁ οὐρανός. τὸ μὲν πρόσωπον τοῦ οὐρανοῦ γινώσκετε διακρίνειν, τὰ δὲ σημεῖα τῶν καιρῶν οὐ δύνασθε.

Opsias genomenēs legete, Eudia, pyrrazei gar ho ouranos kai prōi, Sēmeron cheimōn, pyrrazei gar stygnazōn ho ouranos. To men prosōpon tou ouranou ginōskete diakrinein, ta de sēmeia tōn kairōn ou dynasthe.

Translation (RSV)

When it is evening, you say, "It will be fair weather; for the sky is red." And in the morning, "It will be stormy today, for the sky is red and threatening." You know how to interpret the appearance of the sky, but you cannot interpret the signs of the times.

== Similar texts ==
Luke 12:54-56

When you see a cloud rising in the west, you say at once, "A shower is coming"; and so it happens. And when you see the south wind blowing, you say, "There will be scorching heat"; and it happens. You hypocrites! You know how to interpret the appearance of earth and sky; but why do you not know how to interpret the present time? (RSV)

The passage in Luke has the following differences:

1. the questioners are "some of the scribes and Pharisees" instead of "the Pharisees and Sadducees";
2. the questioners do not demand a "sign from heaven"; and
3. the "sign of Jonah" of Matt. 16:4 is not mentioned.

Gospel of Thomas, Logion 91:2

"You test the face of heaven and earth, but you have not known what is ahead of you, you do not know how to test this time".

== Manuscript evidence ==
Include passage

C, D, K, L, (N), W, Δ, Θ, Π, f^{1}, 22, 33, 565, 700, 892, 1009, 1010, 1071, 1079, 1195, 1230, 1241, 1242, 1253, 1344, 1365, 1546, 1646, 2148, 2174, ℓ 150^{mg}, (ℓ 185, ℓ 211, ℓ 333, ℓ 950 δύνασθε γνῶναι), Byz/$\mathfrak{M}$, it, vg, syr^{p}, syr^{h}, cop^{bo^{mss}}, eth, geo. Jerome included this passage in his Vulgate Bible, but he was aware that most of the manuscripts known to him did not contain it. 794 contains the passage, but on the margin.

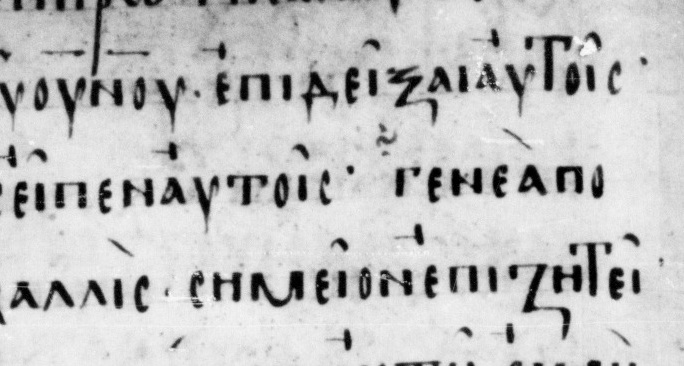
Codex Macedoniensis (Y) or 034 (Gregory-Aland) with the text of Matthew 16:2.4, it lacks signs of the times (Matthew 16:2b-3)

Exclude passage

א, B, V, X, Y, Γ, 047, 2, f^{13}, 34, 39, 44, 84, 151, 157, 180, 194, 272, 274, 344, 376, 445, 539, 563, 595, 661, 699, 776, 777, 780, 788, 792, 826, 828, 852, 994, 1073, 1074, 1076, 1078, 1080, 1093, 1216, 2542, syr^{cur}, syr^{s}, cop^{sa}, cop^{bo^{mss}}, arm, Origen.

Question passage

Marked with asterisks (*) or obeli (÷). Codex Basilensis, Codex Athous Dionysiou, 348, 707, 711, 829, 873, 905, ℓ 184.

Relocate passage

Minuscule 579 does not omit the passage but inserts it after verse 9.

== Present scholars ==
Some scholars regard the passage as a later insertion from a source similar to Luke 12:54–56, or from the Lukan passage itself, with an adjustment concerning the particular signs of the weather. Scrivener (and Lagrange) argued that the words were omitted by copyists in climates (for example Egypt) where a red sky in the morning does not announce rain. Manuscript evidence is strong and textual critics take the omission very seriously. Internal evidence also can be used against authenticity. In passage 16:2b–3 Jesus spoke to his opponents in the second person, but in verse 4 he speaks in the third person. Verse 4 can be treated as a direct answer to the request of verse 1. Gundry argues for the originality of passage, because of some differences with parallel passage in Luke 12:54–56. It was not rewritten from Luke ad litteram. According to Weiss these verses cannot be adapted from Luke. Matthew used another, older source. Davies and Allison hesitate. According to Hirunuma, the "textual status of vv. 2b–3 must remain suspect".

According to Weiss and Tregelles the omission was a result of conformation to the preceding Matthew 12:38–39 (and also Mark 8:11-12).

Matthew 12:38–39	Matthew 16:1–4
^{38}Then some of the scribes and Pharisees said to him, "Teacher, we wish to see a sign from you." ^{39}But he answered them, "An evil and adulterous generation seeks for a sign; but no sign shall be given to it except the sign of the prophet Jonah."	^{1}And the Pharisees and Sadducees came, and to test him they asked him to show them a sign from heaven. ^{2}He answered them, "When it is evening, you say, «It will be fair weather; for the sky is red.» ^{3}And in the morning, 'It will be stormy today, for the sky is red and threatening.' You know how to interpret the appearance of the sky, but you cannot interpret the signs of the times.^{4}An evil and adulterous generation seeks for a sign, but no sign shall be given to it except the sign of Jonah."

About γινωσκετε which means 'you know', Theodor Zahn says: "The word γινωσκετε is used in a way that is unusual for the New Testament, where οιδα is used instead."

Fleddermann notes that "the form πυρραζει appears only in Byzantine writers, a further sign that the passage is a late interpolation". The meaning of πυρραζει is 'it is red' and Byzantine writers are from the 4th century and later.

Kurt Aland: "The saying in Matt. 16:2b-3 represents a very early tradition, as does the Pericope Adulterae in John 7:53-8:11. (...) Matt. 16:2b-3 may possibly have been suggested by Luke 12:54-56, but it is not a parallel in the strict sense. In any event both texts must have been admitted in parts of the Greek Gospel tradition at some time in the second century – a period when there was greater freedom with the text. Only then were such extensive insertions possible, but considering the amount of opposition apparently encountered by the Pericope Adulterae, it must have been quite strongly rooted in the evangelical tradition."

According to R. T. France, the passage is probably an early gloss, verse 4 follows directly after 16:2a, and "sign of heaven" was not explained in original text of Matthew, just like "sign of Jonah" from 16:4 which left unexplained.

== See also ==
- List of New Testament verses not included in modern English translations
- Red sky at morning
- Sign of Jonah
- Textual variants in the Gospel of Matthew

Other disputed passages

- Mark 16:9-20
- Luke 22:43–44
- Jesus and the woman taken in adultery (John 7:53-8:11)
- Comma Johanneum (1 John 5:7b-8a)
- John 5:3b-4
- Doxology to the Lord's Prayer
- Luke 22:19b-20
