= Minuscule 829 =

- New Testament manuscript
- Text: Gospels †
- Date: 12th century
- Script: Greek
- Now at: Biblioteca della Badia
- Size: 23 cm by 17.5 cm
- Type: Byzantine text-type
- Category: none
- Note: —

Minuscule 829 (in the Gregory-Aland numbering), ε220 (von Soden), is a 12th-century Greek minuscule manuscript of the New Testament on parchment.

== Description ==
The codex contains the text of the four Gospels, on 222 parchment leaves (size 23 cm by 17.5 cm). It lacks text of Matthew 1:1-13:28. The text is written in two columns per page, 26 lines per page. It is ornamented.

The text is divided according to the κεφαλαια (chapters), and according to the smaller Ammonian Sections (in Mark 236 sections, the last numbered section in 16:12). The numbers of the κεφαλαια are given at the left margin, and their τιτλοι (titles) at the top of the pages. The numbers of the Ammonian Sections are given with a references to the Eusebian Canons (written under Ammonian Sections) at the margin.

It contains liturgical books with hagiographies: Synaxarion and Menologion, the tables of the κεφαλαια (table of contents) before each Gospel, lectionary markings at the margin for liturgical use, subscriptions at the end of each of the Gospels, and stichoi. It has so called Jerusalem Colophon at the end Gospel of Mark.

== Text ==
The Greek text of the codex is a representative of the Byzantine text-type. Hermann von Soden classified it to the textual family I^{β}. Kurt Aland did not place it in any Category. According to Gregory it could be related to the textual family f^{13}.

According to the Claremont Profile Method it represents textual cluster 1216 in Luke 1, Luke 10, and Luke 20, which stands in considerable distance to K^{x}.

The texts of the Matthew 16:2b–3, John 5:4.5, and the Pericope Adulterae (John 7:53-8:11) are marked by an obelus. The text of the Christ's agony at Gethsemane (Luke 22:43.44) is marked by "Lk".

== History ==
Gregory dated the manuscript to the 12th century, other palaeographers dated it to the 11th century. Currently the manuscript is dated by the INTF to the 12th century.

The manuscript was examined and described by Antonio Rocci in 1882. It was added to the list of New Testament manuscripts by Scrivener (627) and Gregory (829^{e}). Gregory saw it in 1886.

Currently the manuscript is housed at the Biblioteca della Badia (A' α. 6), in Grottaferrata.

== See also ==
- List of New Testament minuscules
- Biblical manuscript
- Textual criticism
- Minuscule 830
