= Minuscule 477 =

- New Testament manuscript
- Text: Gospels
- Date: 13th century
- Script: Greek
- Now at: Trinity College, Cambridge
- Size: 21 cm by 15 cm
- Type: Byzantine text-type
- Category: V
- Note: marginalia

Minuscule 477 (in the Gregory-Aland numbering), ε 350 (in the Soden numbering), is a Greek minuscule manuscript of the New Testament, on parchment. Palaeographically it has been assigned to the 13th century. Scrivener labelled it by number 508. The manuscript has complex contents, with marginalia.

== Description ==
The codex contains the text of the four Gospels on 317 parchment leaves (size 21 cm by 15 cm), without any lacunae. It is written in one column per page, 26 lines per page.

The text is divided according to the κεφαλαια (chapters), whose numbers are given at the margin, and the τιτλοι (titles of chapters) at the top. There is also a division according to the smaller Ammonian Sections, (without references to the Eusebian Canons).

It contains tables of the κεφαλαια (tables of contents) before each Gospel, lectionary markings at the margin (for liturgical use), and Synaxarion (added by a later hand on paper).

== Text ==
The Greek text of the codex is a representative of the Byzantine text-type. Kurt Aland placed it in Category V. According to the Claremont Profile Method it represents textual cluster 1216 in Luke 1 (weak), Luke 10 (weak), and Luke 20. It creates textual pair with 2174.

== History ==
Currently it is dated to the 13th century by the Institute for New Testament Textual Research.

The manuscript used to be held at the Pantokratoros monastery at Mount Athos. It was taken to England and belonged to Richard Bentley (as did Minuscule 489), who presented it to the Trinity College.

The manuscript was examined and collated by Frederick Henry Ambrose Scrivener, who published its text in 1852. The manuscript was added to the list of New Testament manuscripts by Scrivener. C. R. Gregory saw it in 1883.

It is housed at the Trinity College (B. X. 17) in Cambridge.

== See also ==
- List of New Testament minuscules
- Biblical manuscript
- Textual criticism
