= Minuscule 563 =

- New Testament manuscript
- Text: Gospels
- Date: 11th century
- Script: Greek
- Now at: Edinburgh University Library
- Size: 14.5 cm by 10.8 cm
- Type: Byzantine / mixed
- Category: none
- Note: in bad condition

Minuscule 563 (in the Gregory-Aland numbering), ε 160 (in the Soden numbering), is a Greek minuscule manuscript of the New Testament, on parchment. Palaeographically it has been assigned to the 11th century. Scrivener labelled it by number 519.

== Description ==
The codex contains a complete text of the four Gospels on 198 parchment leaves (size 14.5 cm by 10.8 cm), with only one lacuna in John 21:19-25. The manuscript was written by many hands. The writing is in one column per page, 20-26 lines per page.

It contains the tables of the κεφαλαια before every Gospel, numerals of the κεφαλαια are given at the margin, the τιτλοι, the Ammonian Sections (in Mark 239 - 16:16), the Eusebian Canons, lectionary markings, subscriptions at the end of each of the Gospels, and pictures.

The manuscript has survived in bad condition.

== Text ==
The Greek text of the codex Hermann von Soden classified to the textual family K^{x}. Aland did not placed it in any Category. According to Claremont Profile Method it represents the textual family K^{x} in Luke 10. In Luke it represents mixed text, in Luke 20 it has mixed Byzantine text.

The text of Matthew 16:2b–3 (Signs of the Times) and John 21:19-25 were omitted by the original scribe.

== History ==
The manuscript contains the inscription "ex libris Domini Johannis Chesselaei", and seems to have been presented to Edinburgh University Library by Sir John Chessley about 1650. The manuscript was announced by Gustav Haenel. It was added to the list of New Testament manuscripts by Scrivener.

Currently the manuscript is housed at the Edinburgh University Library (MS 219) in Edinburgh.

== See also ==
- List of New Testament minuscules
- Biblical manuscript
- Textual criticism
