= Minuscule 34 =

- New Testament manuscript
- Text: Gospels
- Date: 10th century
- Script: Greek
- Found: ca. 1650
- Now at: National Library of France
- Size: 28.8 cm by 19.2 cm
- Type: Byzantine text-type
- Category: V
- Hand: splendidly written
- Note: marginalia

Minuscule 34 is a Greek minuscule manuscript of the New Testament Gospels, written on vellum. It is designated by the siglum 34 in the Gregory-Aland numbering of New Testament manuscripts, and A^{19} in the von Soden numbering of New Testament manuscripts. Using the study of comparative writing styles (palaeography), it has been assigned to the 10th century.

== Description ==
The manuscript is a codex (precursor to the modern book format), containing the complete text of the four Gospels. The text is written in one column per page, 22 lines per page, on 469 parchment leaves (sized 28.8 cm by 19.2 cm). According to 19th century Anglican divine Dean Burgon it is "splendidly written and in splendid condition". The headpieces and the initial letters are ornamented with colours. Leaves 1-3 were supplied by a later hand, with a Homilien (homily) of Psellus.

The text is surrounded by a a biblical commentary (known as a catena), with the commentary in Mark being that of Victorinus of Pettau. However, the text of Mark 16:8-20 does not have any commentary. The commentary text is similar to that seen in Minuscule 194.

The text is divided according to their chapters (known as κεφαλαια / kephalaia), whose numbers are given in the margin, and their titles (known as τιτλοι / titloi) written at the top of the pages. There is also another division according to the smaller Ammonian Sections (in Mark 241 Sections, the last section in 16:20), but there are no references to the Eusebian Canons (both early divisions of the Gospels into various sections).

It contains the Epistle to Carpius, the Eusebian Canon tables, prolegomena (introductions), pictures, and has subscriptions at the end of each Gospel containing the number of lines (known as στιχοι / stichoi), and portraits of the four Evangelists.

== Text ==
The Greek text of the codex is considered to be a representative of the Byzantine text-type. Biblical scholar Kurt Aland placed it in Category V of his New Testament manuscript classification system. It was not examined by the Claremont Profile Method.

It lacks Matthew 16:2b–3. The text of the Pericope Adulterae (John 7:53-8:11) is marked in asterisks to note it as doubtful. It has a note at the margin: "mais c'est une erreur. None avone verifie le passage avec soin, et cette note n'y existe nulle part". It contains the text of Luke 22:43-44 without obelus or asterisk, but it has questionable scholion in the margin.

== History ==
The earliest history of the manuscript is unknown; however, it was likely written on Mount Athos, and belonged to the Stavronikita monastery. It was brought by Pierre Seguier to France and became part of the Fonds Coislin.

The manuscript was examined and described by scholar Bernard de Montfaucon, textual critics Johann J. Wettstein, Johann M. A. Scholz, Constantin von Tischendorf, Paulin Martin, and clergyman Dean Burgon.

It was added to the list of the New Testament manuscripts by J. J. Wettstein, who gave it the number 34. Biblical scholar Caspar René Gregory saw the manuscript in 1885.

The manuscript was dated by Scholz and Martin to the 10th century. It is currently dated by the INTF to the 10th century. It is presently housed in the Bibliothèque nationale de France (shelf number Coislin Gr. 195) at Paris.

== See also ==
- List of New Testament minuscules
- Biblical manuscripts
- Textual criticism
