= Minuscule 776 =

- New Testament manuscript
- Text: Gospels
- Date: 11th century
- Script: Greek
- Now at: National Library of Greece
- Size: 20.5 cm by 16 cm
- Type: Byzantine
- Category: none
- Note: commentary

Minuscule 776 (in the Gregory-Aland numbering), ε1228 (von Soden), is a Greek minuscule manuscript of the New Testament written on parchment. Palaeographically it has been assigned to the 11th century. The manuscript has complex contents.

== Description ==
The codex contains the text of the four Gospels, on 387 parchment leaves (size 20.5 cm by 16 cm). The text is written in two columns per page, 19 lines per page.

The text is divided according to the κεφαλαια (chapters), whose numbers are given at the margin, with their τιτλοι (titles) at the top of the pages. There is also another division according to the smaller Ammonian Sections (in Mark 241 sections – the last in 16:20), with references to the Eusebian Canons.

It contains the Epistula ad Carpianum, double Prolegomena of Cosmas, and other longer pieces, with tables of the κεφαλαια (tables of contents) before each Gospel, lectionary markings at the margin, liturgical books with hagiographies (Synaxarion and Menologion), and pictures.

== Text ==
The Greek text of the codex is a representative of the Byzantine text-type with some alien readings. Hermann von Soden classified it to the textual family I^{κ}. Kurt Aland the Greek text of the codex did not place in any Category. According to the Claremont Profile Method it represent the textual family M106 in Luke 1, Luke 10, and Luke 20.

The lacks the texts of Matthew 16:2b–3 (added by later hand in the margin) and Pericope Adulterae (John 7:53–8:11). The text of Luke 22:43–44 is marked by an obelus.

== History ==
C. R. Gregory dated the manuscript to the 11th century. The manuscript is currently dated by the INTF to the 11th century.

The name of the scribe was Symeon, a monk.

The manuscript was noticed in a catalogue from 1876.

It was added to the list of New Testament manuscripts by Gregory (776). Gregory saw the manuscript in 1886.

The manuscript is now housed at the National Library of Greece (76) in Athens.

== See also ==
- List of New Testament minuscules
- Biblical manuscript
- Textual criticism
- Minuscule 775
