= Minuscule 2174 =

- New Testament manuscript
- Text: Gospels
- Date: 13th century
- Script: Greek
- Now at: Russian National Library
- Size: 17.2 by 12.6 cm
- Category: none
- Note: marginalia

Minuscule 2174 (in the Gregory-Aland numbering), is a Greek minuscule manuscript of the New Testament, on parchment leaves. Paleographically it has been assigned to the 13th century. It has marginalia.

== Description ==
The codex contains a complete text of the four Gospels on 250 parchment leaves (size 17.2 cm by 12.6 cm). The text is written in one column per page, 24 lines per page (size of column 11 by 7.6 cm). The initial letters are in red.

The text is divided according to the κεφαλαια (chapters), whose numbers are given at the margin, and their τιτλοι (titles) at the top of the pages. There is also a division according to the smaller Ammonian Sections (in Mark 236 Sections - 16:19), (no references to the Eusebian Canons).

It contains the Eusebian Canon tables, tables of the κεφαλαια (tables of contents) before each Gospel, incipits, Synaxarion, and subscriptions at the end of each Gospel.

Kurt Aland did not place the Greek text of the codex in any Category. According to the Claremont Profile Method it represents a textual cluster 1216 in Luke 1, Luke 10, and Luke 20. It creates a textual pair with 477, weak in Luke 1 and Luke 10. The manuscript is a fragmentary in Luke 1.

The Pericope Adulterae (John 7:53-8:11) was added by a later hand.

The manuscript is often cited in Nestle-Aland's editions of the Novum Testamentum Graece.

It is currently housed at the Russian National Library (Gr. 513), at Saint Petersburg.

== See also ==
- List of New Testament minuscules
- Biblical manuscript
- Textual criticism
