= Codex Ottobonianus =

Codex Ottobonianus refers to codices that are housed at the Vatican Library in the Ottobonianus collection. The manuscripts previously belonged to the private collection of Cardinal Ottoboni. Codex Ottobonianus may specifically refer to:

- Codex Ottobonianus gr. 66, minuscule 386 (on the list Gregory-Aland) — New Testament in Greek; 14th century;
- Codex Ottobonianus gr. 204, minuscule 387 (Gregory-Aland) — the four Gospels in Greek; 12th century;
- Codex Ottobonianus gr. 212, minuscule 388 (Gregory-Aland) — the four Gospels in Greek; 12th/13th century;
- Codex Ottobonianus gr. 297, minuscule 389 (Gregory-Aland) — the four Gospels in Greek; 11th century
- Codex Ottobonianus gr. 391, minuscule 390 (Gregory-Aland) — New Testament in Greek; 1281/1282
- Codex Ottobonianus gr. 432, minuscule 391 (Gregory-Aland) — the four Gospels in Greek; 1055
- Codex Ottobonianus gr. 258, minuscule 628 (Gregory-Aland) — New Testament (except Gospels) in Greek; 14th century
- Codex Ottobonianus gr. 298, minuscule 629 (Gregory-Aland) — Book of Acts, Pauline epistles, and General Epistles in Greek; 14th century
- Codex Ottobonianus gr. 325, minuscule 630 (Gregory-Aland) — Book of Acts and the Pauline epistles in Greek; 12th/13th century
- Codex Ottobonianus gr. 417, minuscule 631 (Gregory-Aland) — General epistles in Greek; 15th century
- Codex Vaticanus Ottobonianus Latinus 1829 — one of the three most important manuscripts preserving the poems of Catullus
