= Minuscule 551 =

- New Testament manuscript
- Text: Gospels
- Date: 12th century
- Script: Greek
- Found: 1837
- Now at: British Library
- Size: 21.9 cm by 15.4 cm
- Type: Byzantine text-type
- Category: V
- Note: full marginalia

Minuscule 551 (in the Gregory-Aland numbering), ε 251 (in the Soden numbering), is a Greek minuscule manuscript of the New Testament, on parchment. Palaeographically it has been assigned to the 12th century. Scrivener labeled it by number 538.

== Description ==
The codex contains a complete text of the four Gospels on 233 parchment leaves (size 21.9 cm by 15.4 cm). The writing is in one column per page, 22-23 lines per page.

The text is divided according to the κεφαλαια (chapters), whose numerals are given at the margin, and the τιτλοι (titles of chapters) at the top of the pages. There is a division according to the Ammonian Sections, and some references to the Eusebian Canons. The number of Ammonian Sections and κεφαλαια are varies from what is usual.

It contains the Epistula ad Carpianum, Prolegomena (added by a later hand), tables of the κεφαλαια (tables of contents) are placed before every Gospel. There are barbarous headpieces to the Gospels.

It contains lectionary markings at the margin, incipits, (Synaxarion and Menologion added by a later hand), subscriptions at the end of each Gospel, with numbers of στιχοι, and pictures of the four Evangelist.

== Text ==
The Greek text of the codex is a representative of the Byzantine text-type. Aland placed it in Category V. According to the Claremont Profile Method it represents the textual family K^{x} in Luke 1, Luke 10, and Luke 20.

== History ==
The manuscript was held in the Karakalou monastery at Athos peninsula. In 1837 Robert Curzon, Lord Zouche, brought this manuscript to England (along with the codices 547-550). The entire collection of Curzon was bequeathed by his daughter in 1917 to the British Museum, where it had been deposited, by his son, since 1876.

The manuscripts was added to the list of the New Testament minuscule manuscripts by F. H. A. Scrivener (538) and C. R. Gregory (551). Gregory saw it in 1883.

The manuscript was examined by Scrivener, Dean Burgon, and Gregory.

It is currently housed at the British Library (Add MS 39594) in London.

== See also ==
- List of New Testament minuscules
- Biblical manuscript
- Textual criticism
