= Minuscule 550 =

- New Testament manuscript
- Text: Gospels
- Date: 12th century
- Script: Greek
- Found: 1837
- Now at: British Library
- Size: 25.3 cm by 19.1 cm
- Type: Byzantine text-type
- Category: V
- Note: marginalia

Minuscule 550 (in the Gregory-Aland numbering), 537 (Scrivener's numbering), ε 250 (in the Soden numbering), is a Greek minuscule manuscript of the New Testament, on parchment. Palaeographically it has been assigned to the 12th century. The manuscript has complex contents, with marginalia. It was adapted for liturgical use.

== Description ==
The codex contains a complete text of the four Gospels on 211 parchment leaves (size 25.3 cm by 19.1 cm). The writing is in one column per page, 33 lines per page, in large and spread minuscule letters.

The text is divided according to the κεφαλαια (chapters), whose numerals are given at the margin, and the τιτλοι (titles of chapters) at the top of the pages. There is also a division according to the Ammonian Sections (in Mark 240 sections, the last in 16:9), (no references to the Eusebian Canons).

It contains the Epistula ad Carpianum, Prolegomena (added by a later hand), tables of the κεφαλαια (tables of contents) before each Gospel, lectionary markings at the margin (for liturgical use), incipits, liturgical books with hagiographies (Synaxarion and Menologion), subscriptions at the end of each Gospel with numbers of στιχοι, and marginal notes.

== Text ==
The Greek text of the codex is a representative of the Byzantine text-type. Hermann von Soden included it to the textual family K^{x}. Aland placed it in Category V. According to the Claremont Profile Method it represents K^{x} in Luke 1 and Luke 20. In Luke 10 no profile was made.

== History ==
In 1609 the manuscript belonged to Gerasimus. It was held in the Karakalou monastery at Athos peninsula. In 1837 Robert Curzon, Lord Zouche, brought this manuscript to England (along with the codices 547-551). The entire collection of Curzon was bequeathed by his daughter in 1917 to the British Museum, where it had been deposited, by his son, since 1876.

The manuscript was added to the list of the New Testament manuscript by F. H. A. Scrivener (536) and C. R. Gregory (549). It was examined by Scrivener, Dean Burgon, and Gregory.

It is currently housed at the British Library (Add MS 39593) in London.

== See also ==
- List of New Testament minuscules
- Biblical manuscript
- Textual criticism
