= Minuscule 549 =

- New Testament manuscript
- Text: Gospels
- Date: 11th century
- Script: Greek
- Found: 1837
- Now at: British Library
- Size: 28.9 cm by 23.7 cm
- Type: Byzantine text-type
- Category: V
- Note: marginalia

Minuscule 549 (in the Gregory-Aland numbering), 536 (Scrivener's numbering), A ^{136} (in the Soden numbering), is a Greek minuscule manuscript of the New Testament, on parchment. Palaeographically it has been assigned to the 11th century. The manuscript has complex contents. It was adapted for liturgical use.

== Description ==
The codex contains the text of the four Gospels on 217 parchment leaves (size 28.9 cm by 23.7 cm). The text is written in one column per page, 12 lines per page for biblical text, and 33 lines per page with a Commentary.

The text is divided according to the κεφαλαια (chapters), whose numbers are given at the margin, with the τιτλοι (titles of chapters) at the top of the pages.

It contains Prolegomena, the tables of the κεφαλαια (tables of contents) are placed before every Gospel, lectionary markings at the margin (for liturgical use), incipits, Synaxarion, Menologion, and subscriptions at the end of each Gospel. The biblical text is surrounded by a commentary. The commentary to the Gospel of Mark is of Victorinus authorship.

== Text ==
The Greek text of the codex is a representative of the Byzantine text-type. Aland placed it in Category V. Wisse did not make a profile to this manuscript.

== History ==
Formerly the manuscript was held in the Xenophontos monastery at Athos peninsula. In 1837 Robert Curzon, Lord Zouche, brought this manuscript to England (along with the manuscripts 547, 550, 551). The entire collection of Curzon was bequeathed by his daughter in 1917 to the British Museum, where it had been deposited, by his son, since 1876.

The manuscript was added to the list of the New Testament manuscript by F. H. A. Scrivener (536) and C. R. Gregory (549). It was examined by Scrivener, Dean Burgon, and Gregory.

It is currently housed at the British Library (Add MS 39592) in London.

== See also ==
- List of New Testament minuscules
- Biblical manuscript
- Textual criticism
