= Minuscule 512 =

- New Testament manuscript
- Text: Gospels
- Date: 14th century
- Script: Greek
- Now at: Christ Church, Oxford
- Size: 24.2 cm by 17.5 cm
- Type: Byzantine text-type
- Category: V

Minuscule 512 (in the Gregory-Aland numbering), ε 441 (in the Soden numbering), is a Greek minuscule manuscript of the New Testament, on parchment. Palaeographically it has been assigned to the 14th century. Scrivener labelled it by number 498. The manuscript has complex contents. It was adapted for liturgical use.

== Description ==
The codex contains the complete text of the four Gospels on 210 parchment leaves (size 24.2 cm by 17.5 cm). It is written in one column per page, 24 lines per page.

The text is divided according to the κεφαλαια (chapters), whose numbers are given at the margin, and some τιτλοι (titles of chapters) at the top of the pages.

It contains tables of the κεφαλαια (tables of contents) before each Gospel, αναγνωσεις (lessons), liturgical books with hagiographies (Synaxarion and Menologion), lectionary markings (much of this rubricated), subscriptions at the end of each Gospel with number of στιχοι, and portraits of the Evangelists.

== Text ==
The Greek text of the codex is a representative of the Byzantine text-type. Hermann von Soden included it to the textual family K^{x}. Aland placed it in Category V. According to the Claremont Profile Method it belongs to the K^{r} in Luke 1 and Luke 20. In Luke 10 no profile was made.

It lacks the text of Luke 22:43-44.

== History ==
The manuscript was written by Gregorius. Formerly it belonged to the monastery of Nicholas του καλοχωριου. In 1724 it belonged to presbyter Nicholas. The manuscript came to England about 1731 and was presented to archbishop of Canterbury, William Wake, together with minuscules 73, 74, 506-520. Wake presented it to Christ Church in Oxford.

The manuscript was added to the list of New Testament minuscule manuscripts by F. H. A. Scrivener (498) and C. R. Gregory (512). Gregory saw it in 1883.

It is currently housed at Christ Church (Wake 28) in Oxford.

== See also ==
- List of New Testament minuscules
- Biblical manuscript
- Textual criticism
