= Minuscule 521 =

- New Testament manuscript
- Text: Gospels
- Date: 1321/1322
- Script: Greek
- Now at: Bodleian Library
- Size: 24.4 cm by 17.5 cm
- Type: Byzantine text-type
- Category: V
- Hand: very beautiful copy
- Note: marginalia incomplete

Minuscule 521 (in the Gregory-Aland numbering), ε 443 (in the Soden numbering), is a Greek minuscule manuscript of the New Testament, on a parchment. It is dated by a colophon to the year 1321 or 1322. Scrivener labelled it by number 562. The manuscript has complex context.

== Description ==
The codex contains a complete text of the four Gospels on 271 parchment leaves (size 24.4 cm by 17.5 cm). It is written in one column per page, 20 lines per page.

The text is divided according to the κεφαλαια (chapters), whose numbers are placed at the margin, but there are not their τιτλοι (titles of chapters) at the top or bottom. There is no division according to the Ammonian Sections, with references to the Eusebian Canons.

The tables of the κεφαλαια (tables of contents) are placed before each Gospel, it contains lectionary markings at the margin, incipits, αναγνωσεις (lessons), Synaxarion, Menologion, subscriptions at the end of each Gospel, and numbered στιχοι.

== Text ==
The Greek text of the codex is a representative of the Byzantine text-type. Hermann von Soden classified it to the textual family K^{r}. Aland placed it in Category V. According to the Claremont Profile Method it represents K^{r} in Luke 1 and Luke 20. In Luke 10 no profile was made. It creates textual subgroup with the codex 35.

== History ==
The manuscript was bought by book-dealer Payne (?), from London. Then it belonged to Thomas Thorpe, another book-dealer in London. It was sold in 1824 to Theodore Williams, Vicar of Hendon, for £120 (about £18,900 today). Joseph Mendham bought it for £70 in 1827. It was given by Mendham's widow to Dean Burgon, afterwards to the Bodleian Library.

The manuscript was added to the list of New Testament minuscule manuscripts by Scrivener (562) and C. R. Gregory (521).

It is currently housed at the Bodleian Library (MS. Gr. bib. d. 1) in Oxford.

== See also ==
- List of New Testament minuscules
- Biblical manuscript
- Textual criticism
