= Minuscule 510 =

- New Testament manuscript
- Text: Gospels
- Date: 12th century
- Script: Greek
- Now at: Christ Church, Oxford
- Size: 27.3 cm by 21.1 cm
- Type: Byzantine text-type
- Category: V

Minuscule 510 (in the Gregory-Aland numbering), 496 (in the Scrivener's numbering), ε 259 (in the Soden numbering), is a Greek minuscule manuscript of the New Testament, on parchment. It has been assigned to the 12th century. The manuscript has complex contents. Marginalia are incomplete. It was adapted for liturgical use.

== Description ==
The codex contains the complete text of the four Gospels on 305 parchment leaves (size 27.3 cm by 21.1 cm). The text is written in one column per page, 22 lines per page.

The text is divided according to the κεφαλαια (chapters), whose numbers are given at the margin, but without the τιτλοι (titles of chapters) at the top of the pages. There is no a division according to the Ammonian Sections, with references to the Eusebian Canons.

It contains the Eusebian Canon tables, tables of the κεφαλαια (tables of contents) are placed before each Gospel, lectionary markings at the margin (for liturgical use), incipits, αναγνωσεις (lessons), liturgical books with hagiographies (Synaxarion and Menologion), subscriptions at the end of each Gospel with number of στιχοι, and pictures (in red ink, nearly faded).

The Pericope Adulterae (John 7:53-8:11) is marked with an obelus.

== Text ==
The Greek text of the codex is a representative of the Byzantine text-type. Hermann von Soden included it to the textual family K^{r}. It was confirmed by the Claremont Profile Method. Aland placed it in Category V.

According to the Claremont Profile Method it represents K^{r} in Luke 1 and Luke 20 as a perfect member. In Luke 10 no profile was made.

== History ==
The manuscript is dated by the INTF on the palaeographical ground to the 12th century.

In 1727 the manuscript came from Constantinople to England and was presented to archbishop of Canterbury, William Wake, together with minuscules 73, 74, 506-520. Wake presented it to Christ Church in Oxford.

The manuscript was added to the list of New Testament minuscule manuscripts by F. H. A. Scrivener (496) and C. R. Gregory (510). Gregory saw it in 1883.

It is currently housed at Christ Church (Wake 25) in Oxford.

== See also ==
- List of New Testament minuscules
- Biblical manuscript
- Textual criticism
