= Minuscule 511 =

- New Testament manuscript
- Text: Gospels †
- Date: 13th century
- Script: Greek
- Now at: Christ Church, Oxford
- Size: 24 cm by 16.2 cm
- Type: Byzantine text-type
- Category: V
- Note: full marginalia

Minuscule 511 (in the Gregory-Aland numbering), ε 342 (in the Soden numbering), is a Greek minuscule manuscript of the New Testament, on paper. Palaeographically it has been assigned to the 13th century. Scrivener labelled it by number 497. The manuscript is lacunose, marginalia are complete. It was adapted for liturgical use.

== Description ==
The codex contains the complete text of the four Gospels on 337 paper leaves (size 24 cm by 16.2 cm) with some lacunae (Matthew 1:1-18:9; 24:22-44; Mark 14:13-16:20; Luke 1:1-7:5; John 15:15-25; 21:13-25). All lacunae were supplemented by a later hand (15th century). It is written in one column per page, 19-21 lines per page.

The text is divided according to the κεφαλαια (chapters), whose numbers are given at the margin, and the τιτλοι (titles of chapters) at the top of the pages. There is also a division according to the Ammonian Sections (in Mark 233 Sections – last Section in 16:9), with references Eusebian Canons.

It contains prolegomena to Luke (later hand), the Eusebian Canon tables, tables of the κεφαλαια (tables of contents) are placed before each Gospel, lectionary markings at the margin (for liturgical use), subscriptions to Mark (according to Gregory subscriptions to Matthew) and picture in Matthew.

== Text ==
The Greek text of the codex is a representative of the Byzantine text-type. Hermann von Soden included it to the textual family K^{r}. Aland placed it in Category V. According to the Claremont Profile Method it represents K^{r} in Luke 1 and belongs to the textual cluster 147. In Luke 10 and Luke 20 it creates cluster with 1442.

== History ==
The manuscript is dated by the INTF to the 13th century.

In 1727 the manuscript came from Constantinople to England and was presented to archbishop of Canterbury, William Wake, together with minuscules 73, 74, 506-520. Wake presented it to Christ Church in Oxford. C. R. Gregory saw it in 1883.

The manuscript was added to the list of New Testament minuscule manuscripts by F. H. A. Scrivener (497) and C. R. Gregory (511). Gregory saw it in 1883.

It is currently housed at Christ Church (Wake 27) in Oxford.

== See also ==
- List of New Testament minuscules
- Biblical manuscript
- Textual criticism
