= Minuscule 845 =

- New Testament manuscript
- Text: Gospels
- Date: 14th century
- Script: Greek
- Now at: Biblioteca Fabroniana
- Size: 25 cm by 19.5 cm
- Type: Byzantine text-type
- Category: V
- Note: —

Minuscule 845 (in the Gregory-Aland numbering), ε412 (von Soden), is a 14th-century Greek minuscule manuscript of the New Testament on parchment. The manuscript has complex context.

== Description ==
The codex contains the text of the four Gospels on 315 parchment leaves (size 25 cm by 19.5 cm). The text is written in one column per page, 20 lines per page.

The text is divided according to the κεφαλαια (chapters), whose numbers are given at the margin. There is also a division according to the smaller Ammonian Sections, whose numbers are given at the margin, but without references to the Eusebian Canons.

It contains lectionary markings at the margin, Synaxarion, Menologion, and subscriptions at the end of each of the Gospels, with numbers of στιχοι.

== Text ==
The Greek text of the codex is a representative of the Byzantine text-type. Hermann von Soden classified it to the textual family K^{r}. Kurt Aland placed the Greek text of the codex in Category V. According to the Claremont Profile Method it represents textual family K^{r} in Luke 1 and Luke 20, and creates textual pair with 588. In Luke 10 no profile was made.

The Pericope Adulterae (John 7:53-8:11) is marked by an obelus.

== History ==
According to the colophon it was written in 1330. Currently the manuscript is dated by the INTF to the 14th century.

The manuscript was added to the list of New Testament manuscripts by Gregory (845^{e}). It was examined by Oscar von Gebhardt in 1882.

Currently the manuscript is housed at the Biblioteca Fabroniana (Ms. 307), in Pistoia.

== See also ==
- List of New Testament minuscules
- Biblical manuscript
- Textual criticism
