= Minuscule 928 =

- New Testament manuscript
- Text: New Testament (except Rev.)
- Date: 1304
- Script: Greek
- Now at: Dionysiou monastery, National Library of Russia
- Size: 22.2 cm by 16.6 cm
- Type: Byzantine
- Category: V
- Note: marginalia

Minuscule 928 (in the Gregory-Aland numbering), δ 478 (von Soden), is a 14th-century Greek minuscule manuscript of the New Testament on parchment. It has marginalia and was prepared for liturgical use. The manuscript has survived in complete condition.

== Description ==
The codex contains the text of the New Testament without Book of Revelation, on 333 parchment leaves (size 22.2 cm by 16.6 cm). The text is written in one column per page, 27 lines per page. The leaves of the codex are arranged in octavo. According to Hermann von Soden it is an ornamented manuscript. It contains lectionary markings at the margin for liturgical use It contains also liturgical books with hagiographies: Synaxarion and Menologion.

== Text ==
The Greek text of the codex is a representative of the Byzantine. Hermann von Soden classified it to the textual family K^{r}. Kurt Aland placed it in Category V. According to the Claremont Profile Method it belongs to the textual family K^{r} in Luke 1, Luke 10 and Luke 20. It belongs to the subgroup 35.

== History ==
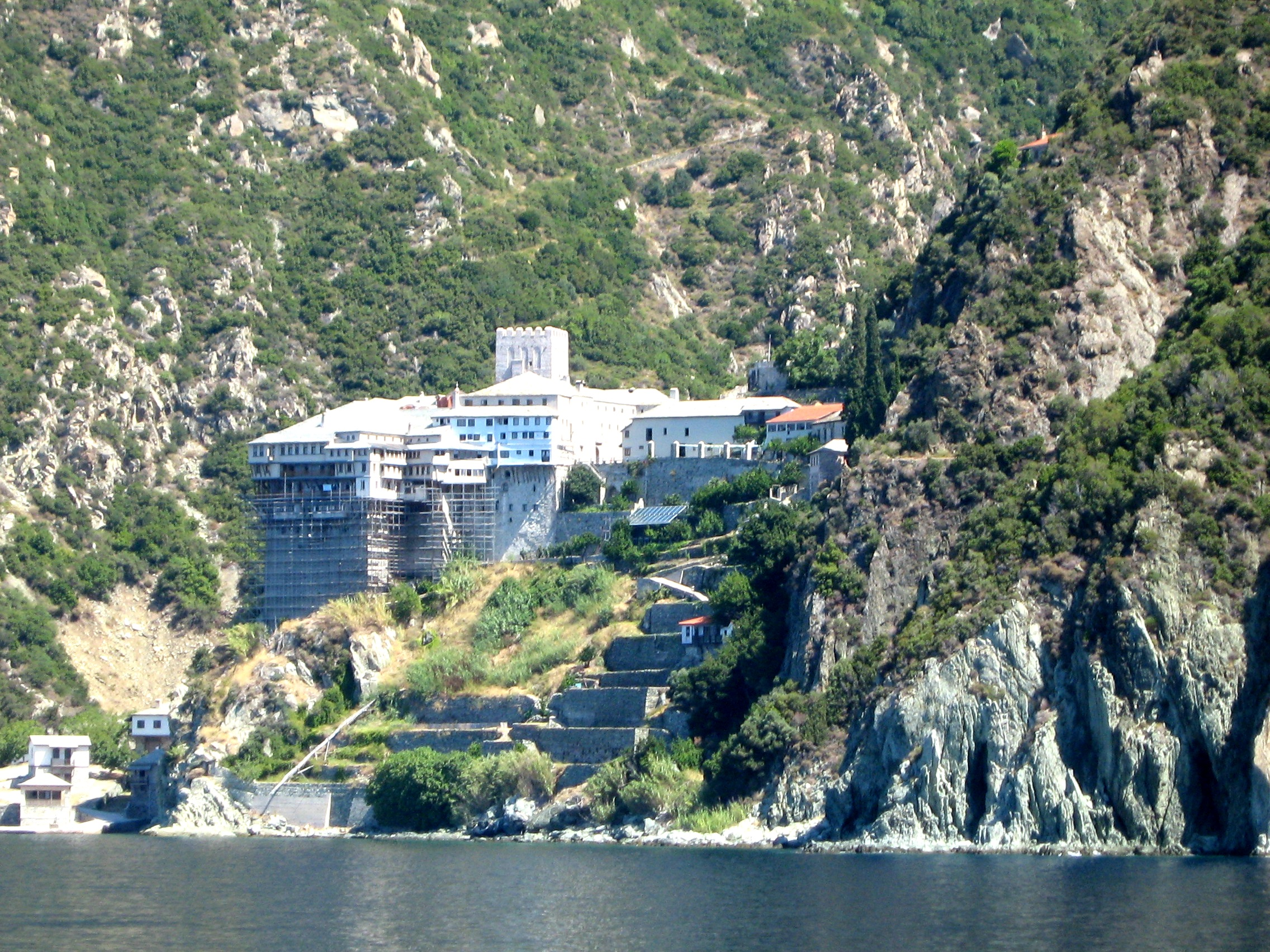
View on the monastery Dionysiou

According to the colophon it was written in 1304. The codex 928 was seen by Gregory at the Dionysiou monastery (8), in Mount Athos. Currently 331 folios of the manuscript are housed at the Dionysiou monastery (56 (9)) in Athos and two folios are housed at the National Library of Russia (Gr. 322) in Sankt Petersburg. The leaves from Petersburg previously were cataloged as minuscule 2165, they contain text of the Philippians 3:13-4:23 and Colossians 1:1-6.

The manuscript was added to the list of New Testament manuscripts by C. R. Gregory (928^{e}). It was not on the Scrivener's list, but it was added to his list by Edward Miller in the 4th edition of A Plain Introduction to the Criticism of the New Testament.

It is not cited in critical editions of the Greek New Testament (UBS4, NA28).

It was examined by Kurt Treu.

== See also ==
- List of New Testament minuscules (1–1000)
- Biblical manuscript
- Textual criticism
