= Sicco Polenton =

Italian jurist, Neo-Latin author, and Renaissance humanist

- Born: 1375; Levico Terme , Italy
- Died: 1447 (aged 71–72); Padua, Italy
- Resting place: Church of San Leonardo, Padua
- Education: Giovanni Conversini; Vittorino da Feltre
- Occupations: Jurist, author, Renaissance humanist
- Spouse: Antonia Enselmini

Sicco Polenton (Italian pronunciation: [ˈsikko polenˈtɔn; -ton]; 1375–1447) was an Italian jurist, Neo-Latin author, and Renaissance humanist. His last name is also spelled Polentone, Polentonus. His first name is also spelled Xico, or Xicho. Sometimes his name also contains "Patavinus" meaning "of Padua".

His son is named Polydorus, and he dedicated his De scriptoribus to his son, as the first page of his book started with "Sicconis Polentoni Liber Scriptom Illustrium Latinae Linguae Incipit Primus ad Filium Polydor Feliciter" ["Here begins Sicco Polentone's First Book on the Illustrious Writers of the Latin Language, for his Son Polydorus"] (Note: "Incipit ... Feliciter" is a formulaic expression often placed at the beginnings of texts. It roughly means "here it starts, may it go well". It is often used by Cicero.) (plate IV).

Sicco Ricci (Rizzi) was born at Levico Terme in either 1375 or 1376. He took the name "Polenton" (Polentonus) from his father Bartolomeo. His first name "Sicco" probably came from that Sicco's father was commander of the guard at Borgo, and named his son after his employer, Siccone di Telvana (vii,).

He studied grammar and rhetoric at Padua under Giovanni Conversini and periodically with Vittorino da Feltre. In 1396, he began his career as a notary of the ruling Carrara family, and then sometime later became a public notary. He obtained Paduan citizenship sometime around 1402–1403. He became the chancellor of the Comune sometime between 1413 and 1424.

In 1408 Sicco married Antonia Enselmini and thereafter his life was devoted mostly to literary endeavours. In 1413 he completed his first Latin work, the Argumenta super aliquot orationibus et invectivis Ciceronis ["Arguments on some speeches and invectives of Cicero"]. In 1419 he published his most successful work, Catinia, a comedy in seven scenes. Thereafter he worked on his Scriptorum illustrium latinae linguae, the first history of the Latin language and its literature, which he had begun by 1425 but did not finish until 1437. He erroneously attributed a piece De puellis ("On girls"), perhaps De tribus puellis, to Ovid.

in 1430, he resigned from chancellorship, due to low salary. In 1431 he ceased to act as notary. After that, he devoted himself to literary pursuits, but still he held various public offices, including that of mayor in 1440-1441. He spent his final years writing various tracts expounding religious arguments and died in Padua in 1446 or 1447. He was buried in the church of San Leonardo, now disappeared.

He understood that classical learning had gone to sleep for a thousand years, but the Muses were waking up again (Ullman, 1928, xv).

== Works ==
- Argumenta super aliquot orationibus et invectivis Ciceronis (1413) ["Arguments on some speeches and invectives of Cicero"]
  - Printed in Commentarii in orationes Ciceronis / Quintus Asconius Pedianus / De artificio Ciceronianae orationis Pro Quinto Ligario / Georgius Trapezuntius / Inquisitio super xi orationes Ciceronis / Antonius Luschus / Argumenta super xii orationibus et invectivis Ciceronis / Sicco Polentonus [184] h. ; Fol. -- Sign.: a10, b6, c-g8, a8, b10, c8, d6, a10, b8, c10, d-e8, f6, g-l8, m6. Printed in 1477 by Johannes de Colonia and Johannes Manthen de Gerretzheim, edited by Hieronymus Squarzaficus.
    - It is a collection of 4 commentaries by four authors, all on Cicero. In particular, Sicco's version commented on 16 speeches by Cicero not commented upon by Luschus.
    - pdf file available for download at.
- La Catinia (1419)
  - A recent edition is published as Arnaldo Segarizzi, La Catinia, le Orazioni e le Epistole di Sicco Polenton umanista Trentino del secolo XV (Bergamo 1899), freely available on Google Books.
  - A more recent edition is published in Catinia. Con testo latino a fronte. Traduzione italiana, introduzione e note di PAOLO BALDAN, (Anguillara Veneta, 1996), 281 pp.
- De ratione studendi (1415) seems lost ( p. XLII).
- Sancti Antonii Confessoris de Padua vita (1435)
- De scriptoribus illustribus latinae linguae libri XVIII ["On Famous Writers of the Latin Language, with 18 books"]
  - First edition (1426?): Biblioteca Riccardiana, MS Riccardianus 21, folios 23v–30v.
  - Second edition (1437?), freely available at the Internet Archive.
    - Vatican, Biblioteca Apostolica Vaticana, autograph manuscript, from the Codex Ottobonianus, found in 1915.
    - edited by B. L. Ullman, and published in 1928 as the Papers and Monographs of the American Academy in Rome, Vol. VI. American Academy in Rome, 1928. Pp. lii + 520. 5 plates and a page of errata.
- See footnote 1 of for some unpublished/minor works.

It contained the first biography of Horace composed in the fifteenth century, and in composing it, Sicco relied on the biography of Horace written by Suetonius, which existed only in very few rare manuscripts then and even now.

The De scriptoribus it is often considered the first history of Latin literature. It took around 25 years to complete, and is preceded by an epitome with a subject index of the authors cited in the work. His stated intent was to gather all biographical information of the great Latin writers up to the 14th century. It was never published in its entirety until Ullman's 1928 edition, though excerpts had been copied and published previously (preface to).

On the contents of the books, Polenton was particularly enamored with Cicero. Of the 18 books, 7 (x-xvi) are devoted to Cicero. As he said, "Quippe res magna est Cicero" ["Indeed, Cicero is a great matter"]. He liked Cato the Elder and Seneca especially also. Lucretius and Martial were barely mentioned, while Petronius, Valerius Flaccus, Frontinus did not appear. Book 6 contains many details on the life of Sicco himself. Book 18 was unfinished.

Polenton himself explicitly places it in the tradition of the "De viris illustribus" and always refers to it as "vita scriptorum illustrium".

There are two editions. The first edition was worked on until around 1426, and it is preserved in an incomplete and non-autograph in the manuscript Firenze, Biblioteca Riccardiana, 121 (R), as well as in four loose folios used as endpapers in another codex. The second edition was probably finished by 1437, and contains the autograph from Codex Ottobonianus, and about twenty manuscripts that descend from it one (on the possible existence of an intermediate version, see once again Ullman 1928, xvi-xx).

Due to the comprehensiveness of the book, there was a legend that Sicco secured the only existing copy of Suetonius' De Viris Illustribus and, after copying from it all that he wanted, destroyed it (Ullman 1928, xiii).

For contrastive examples of the two editions, one may compare the two vitas of Virgil, reprinted and translated in Ziolkowski and Putnam, pp. 321–45 and 369-96.

== Sources ==
- Robathan, Dorothy M. (1932). "A Fifteenth-Century History of Latin Literature." Speculum, 7:2 (April), pp. 239–248.
