= Minuscule 516 =

- New Testament manuscript
- Text: Gospels
- Date: 11th century
- Script: Greek
- Now at: Christ Church, Oxford
- Size: 18.6 cm by 14 cm
- Type: Byzantine text-type
- Category: V
- Hand: elegant
- Note: full marginalia

Minuscule 516 (in the Gregory-Aland numbering), ε 144 (in the Soden numbering), is a Greek minuscule manuscript of the New Testament, on parchment. Palaeographically it has been assigned to the 11th century. Scrivener labelled it with the number 502. It was adapted for liturgical use.

== Description ==
The codex contains the complete text of the four Gospels on 287 parchment leaves (size 18.6 cm by 14 cm) with only one lacunae (Matthew 16:2-17). The text is written in one column per page, 23 lines per page, in a small and elegant hand.

The text is divided according to the κεφαλαια (chapters) numbers of at the margin, the τιτλοι (titles of chapters) at the top of the pages. There is also a division according to the Ammonian Sections, with references to the Eusebian Canons.

It contains the Epistula ad Carpianum, prolegomena, the Eusebian tables (deleted) are given at the beginning of the manuscript, tables of the κεφαλαια (tables of contents) are placed before each Gospel, incipits, lectionary markings at the margin (for liturgical use), Synaxarion, Menologion, and pictures.

== Text ==
The Greek text of the codex is a representative of the Byzantine text-type. Hermann von Soden included it to the textual family K^{x}. Aland placed it in Category V.

According to the Claremont Profile Method it represents textual family K^{x} in Luke 1 and Luke 20. In Luke 10 no profile was made. It was corrected by later hand to K^{r} (subgroup 35).

== History ==
It is dated by the INTF to the 11th century.

In 1727 the manuscript came from Constantinople to England and was presented to archbishop of Canterbury, William Wake, together with the manuscripts 73, 74, 506-520. Wake presented it to Christ Church in Oxford.

The manuscript was added to the list of New Testament minuscule manuscripts by F. H. A. Scrivener (502) and C. R. Gregory (516). Gregory saw it in 1883.

It is currently housed at Christ Church (Wake 32) in Oxford.

== See also ==
- List of New Testament minuscules
- Biblical manuscript
- Textual criticism
