= Minuscule 645 =

Greek minuscule manuscript of the New Testament from 1304

- New Testament manuscript
- Text: Gospels
- Date: 1304/1305
- Script: Greek
- Now at: British Library
- Size: 24.3 cm by 18.2 cm
- Type: Byzantine text-type
- Category: V

Minuscule 645 (in the Gregory-Aland numbering), ε 434 (von Soden), is a Greek minuscule manuscript of the New Testament, on parchment. It is dated by a colophon to the year 1304 (or 1305). The manuscript has complex contents. Scrivener labelled it as 591^{e}.

== Description ==
The codex contains the text of the four Gospels, on 279 parchment leaves (size 24.3 cm by 18.2 cm). It is written in one column per page, 22 lines per page.

It contains tables of the κεφαλαια, numbers of the κεφαλαια (chapters) at the margin, the τιτλοι (titles) at the top, lectionary markings, incipits, αναγνωσεις, subscriptions at the end of each of the Gospels, numbers of στιχοι (in subscriptions), and pictures. The Ammonian Sections were added by a later hand.

The Pericope Adulterae (John 7:53-8:11) is marked with an obelus.

== Text ==
The Greek text of the codex is a representative of the Byzantine text-type. Hermann von Soden classified it to the textual family K^{r}. Kurt Aland placed it in Category V. According to the Claremont Profile Method it represents K^{r} in Luke 1 and Luke 20. In Luke 10 no profile was made.

== History ==
The manuscript was written by Neophytus a monk of Cyprus in 1304/1305. It was held in the monastery in Creta. In 1849 it belonged to Micheal Sarmalenios in Milos. It was bought at Milos by H. O. Coxe in 1857 from a Greek who had it from a relative who had been "hegoumenos" of a Canadian monastery.

A facsimile was given in Catalogue of British Museum.

The manuscript currently is housed at the British Library (Add MS 22506) in London.

== See also ==
- List of New Testament minuscules
- Biblical manuscript
- Textual criticism
