= Minuscule 547 =

- New Testament manuscript
- Text: New Testament (except Revelation)
- Date: 11th century
- Script: Greek
- Found: 1837, Robert Curzon
- Now at: British Library
- Size: 23 cm by 16.5 cm
- Type: Byzantine text-type
- Category: V

Minuscule 547 (in the Gregory-Aland numbering), δ 157 (in the Soden numbering), is a Greek minuscule manuscript of the New Testament, on parchment. Palaeographically it has been assigned to the 11th century. Scrivener labelled it by number 534.

== Description ==
The codex contains the text of the New Testament (except Book of Revelation) on 348 parchment leaves (size 23 cm by 16.5 cm), with one lacuna (John 16:27-19:40). The text is written in one column per page, 31 lines per page.

The text is divided according to the κεφαλαια (chapters), whose numbers are given at the margin, and the τιτλοι (titles of chapters) at the top of the pages. The text of the Gospels has also a division according to the Ammonian Sections, (no references to the Eusebian Canons).

It contains Prolegomena, tables of the κεφαλαια (tables of contents) before each, αναγνωσεις (liturgical notes), subscriptions at the end of each book with numbers of στιχοι, Synaxarion, Menologion, and Euthalian apparatus. The usual arabesque ornaments are in red.

The order of books: Gospels, Acts, Pauline epistles, and Catholic epistles.

== Text ==
The Greek text of the codex is a representative of the Byzantine text-type. Hermann von Soden included it to the textual family K^{rx}. Aland placed it in Category V. According to the Claremont Profile Method it represents K^{x} in Luke 1, Luke 10, and Luke 20. It creates cluster with the codex 147.

The Pericope Adulterae (John 7:53-8:11) is marked with an obelus.

== History ==
Formerly the manuscript was held in the Karakalou monastery at Athos peninsula. In 1837 Robert Curzon, Lord Zouche, brought this manuscript to England (along with the codices 549-552). The entire collection of Curzon was bequeathed by his daughter in 1917 to the British Museum, where it had been deposited, by his son, since 1876.

The manuscript was added to the list of the New Testament manuscripts by Scrivener (534) and Gregory (547). It was examined by Frederick Henry Ambrose Scrivener, Dean Burgon, and C.R. Gregory.

It is currently housed at the British Library (Add MS 39590) in London.

== See also ==
- List of New Testament minuscules
- Biblical manuscript
- Textual criticism
