= Minuscule 694 =

- New Testament manuscript
- Text: Gospels †
- Date: 15th century
- Script: Greek–Latin
- Now at: British Library
- Size: 29.6 cm by 21.3 cm
- Type: Byzantine text-type
- Category: V

Minuscule 694 (in the Gregory-Aland numbering), ε502 (von Soden), is a Greek–Latin diglot minuscule manuscript of the New Testament, on paper. Palaeographically it has been assigned to the 15th century. The manuscript has complex contents. Scrivener labelled it by 598^{e}.

== Description ==
The codex contains the text of the four Gospels on 208 paper leaves (size 29.6 cm by 21.3 cm). The text is written in two columns per page, 33-34 lines per page.

The tables of the κεφαλαια (contents) are placed before each Gospel, numbers of the κεφαλαια (chapters) are given at the margin, and there are no τιτλοι (titles) at the top. There are no divisions according to the Ammonian Sections.

It contains lectionary markings, incipits, αναγνωσεις (lessons), Synaxarion, Menologion, and subscriptions at the end.

== Text ==
The Greek text of the codex is a representative of the Byzantine text-type. Hermann von Soden classified it to the textual family K^{r}. Kurt Aland placed it in Category V.

According to the Claremont Profile Method it represents textual family K^{r} in Luke 1, Luke 10, and Luke 20.

== History ==
Scrivener and Gregory dated the manuscript to the 15th century. Currently the manuscript is dated by the INTF to the 15th century.

The manuscript was bought at Puttick's in 1861.

It was added to the list of New Testament manuscript by Scrivener (598) and Gregory (694).

It was examined by S. T. Bloomfield and Dean Burgon. Gregory saw the manuscript in 1883.

The manuscript is currently housed at the British Library (Add MS 24112) in London.

== See also ==
- List of New Testament minuscules
- Biblical manuscript
- Textual criticism
