= Minuscule 685 =

- New Testament manuscript
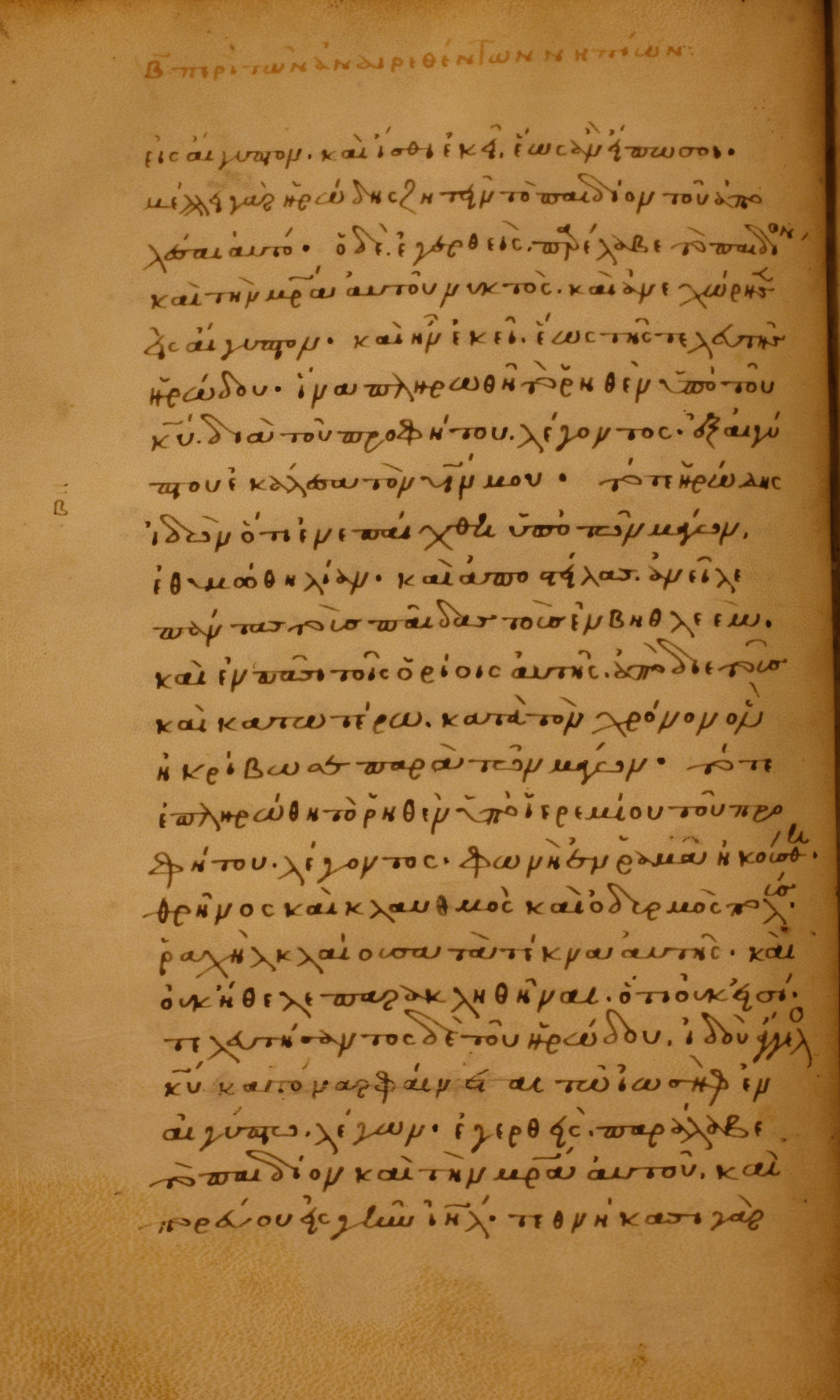
- Folio 3 verso
- Text: Gospels
- Date: 13th century
- Script: Greek
- Now at: University of Michigan
- Size: 24.2 cm by 16 cm
- Type: Byzantine text-type, K^{r}
- Category: V

Minuscule 685 (in the Gregory-Aland numbering) ε 339 (von Soden), is a Greek minuscule manuscript of the New Testament on a parchment. It is dated palaeographically to the 13th century. Scrivener labelled it by 1147^{e}. It contains marginalia.

== Description ==
The codex contains the text of the four Gospels, on 229 parchment leaves (24.2 cm by 16 cm). The leaves are not foliated. The text is written in one column per page, 24 lines per page in minuscule letters.

The text is divided according to the κεφαλαια (chapters), whose numbers are given at the left margin of the text, with their τιτλοι (titles) at the top or bottom of the pages.

It contains prolegomena to the four Gospels, the tables of the κεφαλαια before each Gospel, lectionary markings at the margin for liturgical use, incipits, αναγνωσεις (lessons), Synaxarion (liturgical book with hagiographies), subscriptions at the end of each of the Gospels, and numbers of stichoi to the Gospel of John.

The Pericope Adulterae (John 7:53-8:11) is marked by an obelus.

== Text ==
The Greek text of the codex is a representative of the Byzantine text-type. Hermann von Soden classified it as a member of the textual family K^{r}. Aland placed it in Category V.

According to the Claremont Profile Method it represents family K^{r} in Luke 1, Luke 10, and Luke 20.

== History ==
Formerly the manuscript was held in London (Huth 354).

It was added to the list of the New Testament manuscripts by Scrivener (1147^{e}) and Gregory (658^{e}).

Actually the codex is housed at the University of Michigan (Ms. 151), in Ann Arbor.

== See also ==
- List of New Testament minuscules
- Textual criticism
- Biblical manuscript
