= Minuscule 696 =

- New Testament manuscript
- Text: Gospels
- Date: 13th century
- Script: Greek
- Now at: British Library
- Size: 27.8 cm by 21.3 cm
- Type: Byzantine text-type
- Category: none

Minuscule 696 (in the Gregory-Aland numbering), ε328 (von Soden), is a Greek minuscule manuscript of the New Testament, on parchment. Palaeographically, it has been assigned to the 13th century. The manuscript is lacunose. Scrivener labelled it by 600^{e}.

== Description ==
The codex contains the text of the four Gospels on 350 parchment leaves (size 29.6 cm by 21.3 cm). The text is written in two columns per page, 19-20 lines per page.

The tables of the κεφαλαια (contents) are placed before each Gospel, numbers of the κεφαλαια (chapters) are given at the left margin, there are no the τιτλοι (titles) at the top or bottom. There is no division according to the Ammonian Sections and the Eusebian Canons. It contains lectionary markings, incipits, αναγνωσεις (lessons), Synaxarion, Menologion, stichoi, and pictures. There are remarkable pictures of the Annunciation and the three later Evangelists. The Gospel headings at the left blank.

== Text ==
The Greek text of the codex is a representative of the Byzantine text-type. Hermann von Soden classified it to the textual family K^{r}. Kurt Aland placed it in Category V.

According to the Claremont Profile Method it represents textual family K^{r} in Luke 1 and Luke 20. In Luke 10 no profile was made.

== History ==
Scrivener dated the manuscript to the 14th century, Gregory dated it to the 13th or 14th century. Currently the manuscript is dated by the INTF to the 13th century.

The manuscript was bought in 1862 from H. S. Freeman, former consul in Janina.

It was added to the list of New Testament manuscript by Scrivener (600) and Gregory (696).

It was examined by S. T. Bloomfield, Dean Burgon, and William Hatch. Gregory saw the manuscript in 1883.

Currently the manuscript is housed at the British Library (Add MS 24376).

== See also ==
- List of New Testament minuscules
- Biblical manuscript
- Textual criticism
