= Minuscule 758 (Gregory-Aland) =

- New Testament manuscript
- Text: Gospels
- Date: 14th century
- Script: Greek
- Now at: National Library of Greece
- Size: 14 cm by 10.5 cm
- Type: Byzantine text-type
- Category: V
- Note: —

Minuscule 758 (in the Gregory-Aland numbering), ε474 (von Soden), is a Greek minuscule manuscript of the New Testament written on parchment. Palaeographically it has been assigned to the 14th century. The manuscript has complex contents. Scrivener labelled it as 847^{e}.

== Description ==
The codex contains the text of the four Gospels, on 301 parchment leaves (size 14 cm by 10.5 cm). The text is written in one column per page, 20 lines per page.

The text is divided according to the κεφαλαια (chapters), whose numbers are given at the margin, and their τιτλοι (titles) at the top of the pages. It contains tables of the κεφαλαια before each Gospel, lectionary markings at the margin, incipits, αναγνωσεις (lessons), subscriptions at the end, στιχοι, and pictures.

== Text ==
The Greek text of the codex is a representative of the Byzantine text-type. Hermann von Soden classified it to the textual family K^{r}. Aland placed it in Category V.

According to the Claremont Profile Method, it represents the textual family K^{r} in Luke 1 and Luke 20. In Luke 10 no profile was made. It creates a textual subgroup with 35.

The text of the Pericope Adulterae is marked by an obelus.

== History ==
Scrivener dated the manuscript to the 14th century; Gregory dated the manuscript to the 14th or 15th century. The manuscript is currently dated by the INTF to the 14th century.

In 1870 it was presented to Nicholas form Athens.

It was added to the list of New Testament manuscripts by Scrivener (847) and Gregory (758). Gregory saw the manuscript in 1886.

The manuscript is now housed at the National Library of Greece (151) in Athens.

== See also ==
- List of New Testament minuscules
- Biblical manuscript
- Textual criticism
- Minuscule 757
