= Minuscule 35 =

- New Testament manuscript
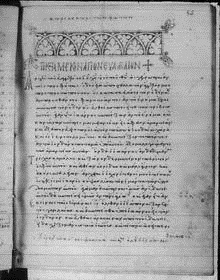
- Text: NT
- Date: 11th century
- Script: Greek
- Found: ca. 1650
- Now at: National Library of France
- Size: 18.6 cm by 13.9 cm
- Type: Byzantine text-type
- Category: V
- Note: member of K^{r} marginalia

Minuscule 35 is a Greek minuscule manuscript of the entire New Testament. It is designated by the siglum 35 in the Gregory-Aland numbering of New Testament manuscripts, and δ 309 in the von Soden numbering of New Testament manuscripts.

Using the study of comparative writing styles (palaeography), it has been assigned to the 11th century. The manuscript has complex contents, marginal notes, and many corrections.

== Description ==
The manuscript is a codex (precursor to the modern book format), containing the entire New Testament written on 328 parchment leaves (sized 18.6 cm by 13.9 cm), with many corrections. The text is written in one column per page, 27 lines per page. It has a homily of John Chrysostom at the end of the Pauline epistles. The text is divided according to the chapters (known as κεφαλαια / kephalaia), whose numbers are given in the margin, with their titles (known as τιτλοι / titloi) written at the top of the pages. There is no division according to the smaller Ammonian Sections or any references to the Eusebian Canons (both early divisions of the Gospels into sections).

It contains the tables of contents (also known as κεφαλαια) before each book, lectionary markings in the margin (for liturgical use), αναγνωσεις (lessons), liturgical books with hagiographies (Synaxarion and Menologion), and subscriptions at the end of each book (with the number of lines known as στιχοι / stichoi). It has lectionary equipment for Acts, the Euthalian Apparatus for the Catholic and Pauline epistles, and scholia for the Book of Revelation.

Book Order

- Gospels
- Acts
- Catholic epistles
- Pauline epistles
- Book of Revelation

== Text ==
The Greek text of the manuscript is currently considered to be one of the best representatives of the Byzantine text-type, and became the basis for The Gospel According to John in the Byzantine Tradition. It has very regular orthography, and differs only slightly from familiar printed editions of the Byzantine text. Wilbur N. Pickering believes subgroup 35 is the original text of the entire New Testament and has published The Greek New Testament According to Family 35.

According to textual critic Hermann von Soden, it is a member of the textual family Family K^{r}. According to the Claremont Profile Method (a specific analysis of textual data), it represents textual family K^{r} in Luke 1 and Luke 20. In Luke 10 no profile was made. It creates the subgroup 35.

Other manuscripts belonging to subgroup 35 are the following manuscripts (all minuscules): 141. 170. 204. 394. 402. 516. 521. 553. 660.^{c} 758.^{*} 769. 797. 928. 1250. 1482. 1487. 1493. 1559. 1572. 1600. 1694.^{*} 2204. 2261. and 2554.

For publication in The Gospel According to John in the Byzantine Tradition, the text of the manuscript was changed in only 18 places in the Gospel of John. In 10 places a different orthography was adopted:

4:9 συχρωνται changed to συγχρωνται
5:8 εγερται changed to εγειρε
5:8, 9, 10, 11, and 12 κραββατον changed to κραβαττον
12:6 εμελλεν changed to εμελεν
18:23 δαιρεις changed to δερεις
20:16 ραβουνι changed to ραββουνι

In 8 places the edited text follows the corrector instead of the first hand, due to an error made by the first hand:

4:13 υδατος 35* τουτο 35^{c}
4:18 ο 35* ον 35^{c}
10:1 αμην 35* αμην αμην 35^{c}
10:16 [3 blank spaces] 35* εχω α ουκ εστιν 35^{c}
10:25 αυτοις αυτοις 35* αυτοις 35^{c}
12:2 om. 35* ην 35^{c}
16:17 om. 35* υπαγω 35^{c}
16:19 om. 35* ειπον 35^{c}

Sometimes the copyist of minuscule 35 presented alternative readings to the running text. In these four instances the editors preferred to leave the uncorrected text as the base text and note the correction in the critical apparatus:

5:4 εταρασσε το 35* εταρασσετο το 35^{c}
14:3 ετοιμασω 35* ετοιμασαι 35^{c}
19:38 ο ιωσηφ 35* ιωσηφ 35^{c}
21:15 om. 35* ο ιησους 35^{c}

Also, in the edition the text of John 7:53-8:11 is marked in the margin by an obelus (÷).. This is in conformity with the practice of the manuscript itself.

== History ==
The earliest history of the manuscript is unknown. It was formerly held at the Athos peninsula in the Great Lavra monestary. Between 1643 and 1653 the manuscript was acquired for the collection of Pierre Séguier (1588-1672), the great-grandfather of Henri-Charles de Coislin, Bishop of Metz. It became a part of the Fonds Coislin. It was added to the list of the New Testament manuscripts by textual critic Johann J. Wettstein, who gave it the number 35.

Biblical scholar Bernard de Montfaucon was the first who examined and described this manuscript. It was later examined and described by textual critics Wettstein, Johann M. A. Scholz, and Paulin Martin. Biblical scholar Caspar René Gregory saw the manuscript in 1885. The text of Revelation was collated by biblical scholar Herman C. Hoskier in 1929.

The manuscript was dated to the 11th or 12th century. It has currently been assigned by the INTF to the 11th century. It is presently housed in the Bibliothèque nationale de France (shelf number Coislin, Gr. 199) in Paris.

== See also ==
- List of New Testament minuscules
- Biblical manuscripts
- Textual criticism
