= Karl Wessely =

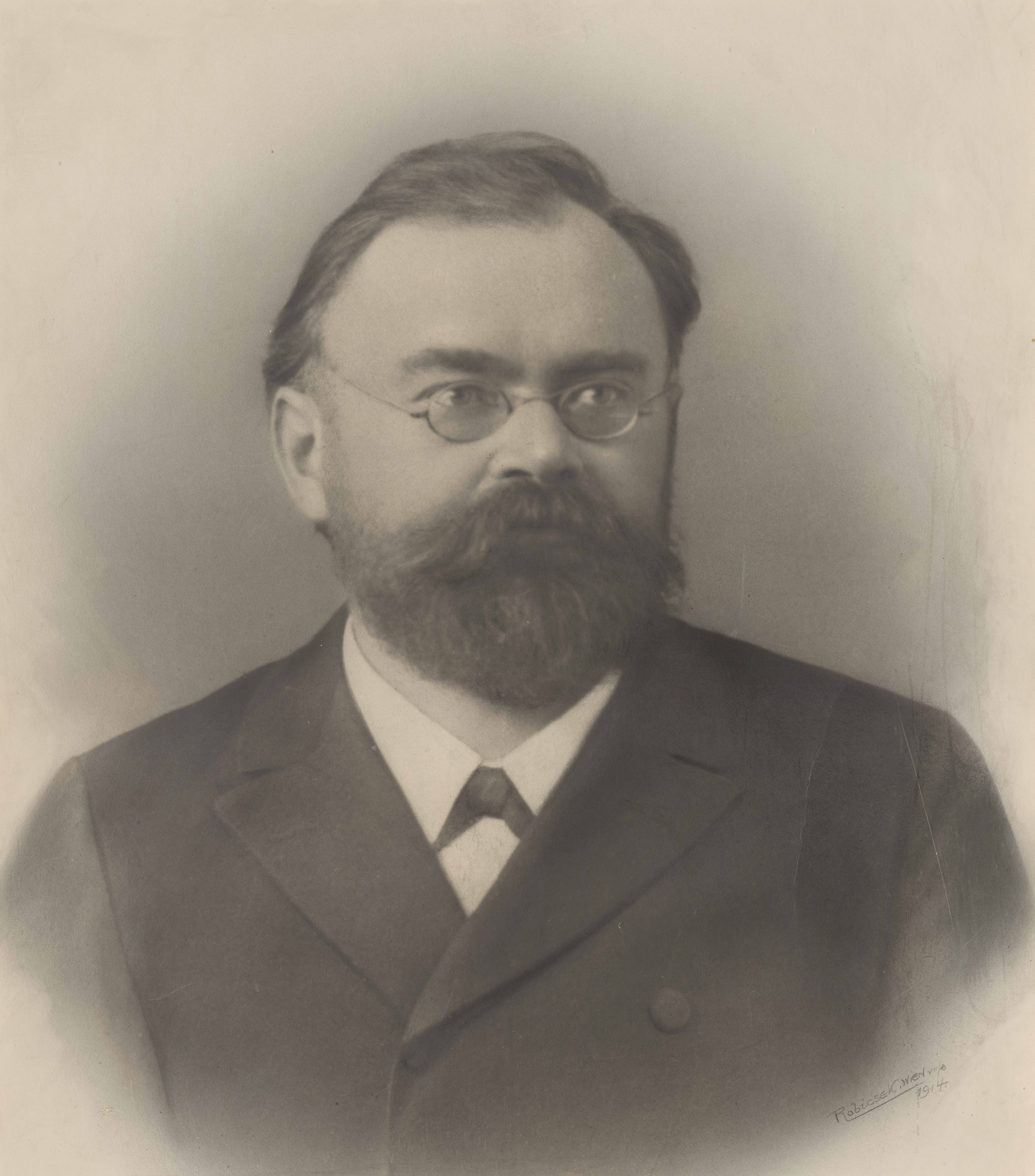
Karl Wessely

Karl Wessely (Carl Wessely; 27 June 1860, Vienna – 21 November 1931) was an Austrian palaeographer and papyrus scholar. He examined manuscripts housed at the Austrian National Library (e.g. Papyrus 3, Uncial 058, 059, 0101, 0237) and in other important European libraries (Papyrus 5).

== Works ==
- Evangelien-Fragmente auf Papyrus, Wiener Studien 4 (1882), 198-214.
- Analekten. 1. Neue Evangelien-Fragmente auf Papyrus Wiener Studien 7 (1883).
- Prolegomena ad papyrorum graecorum novam collectionem edendam (Wien 1883)
- Bemerkungen zu einigen Publicationen auf dem Gebiete der älteren griechischen Paläographie (Wien 1892)
- Papyrus Erzherzog Rainer. Führer durch die Ausstellung, Wien 1894.
- Wie haben die alten Römer geschrieben? (Wien 1898)
- Les plus anciens monuments du christianisme, Patrologia Orientalis IV, 2, (1907).
- Ein fayumisch-griechisches Evangelien-fragment, Wiener Studien 26 (Vienna, 1912), pp. 270–274.
- Griechische und koptische Texte theologischen inhalts, Studien zur Paläographie und Papyruskunde, (Leipzig 1912) reprinted (Amsterdam 1966)

== Bibliography ==
- Hermann Harrauer. Carl Wessely (1860–1931). In: Mario Capasso. Hermae. Scholars and Scholarship in Papyrology. Pisa 2007, pp. 71–75
