= Uncial 058 =

- New Testament manuscript
- Text: Gospel of Matthew 18 †
- Date: 4th century
- Script: Greek
- Now at: Austrian National Library
- Size: 19 cm x 13 cm
- Type: mixed
- Category: III

Uncial 058 (in the Gregory-Aland numbering), ε 010 (von Soden), is a Greek uncial manuscript of the New Testament, dated palaeographically to the 4th century.

== Description ==
The codex contains a part of the Gospel of Matthew (18:18-19.22-23.25-26.28-29), on 1 parchment leaf (19 cm by 13 cm). The text is written in two columns per page, 26 lines per page.

First fragment

First column (18:18)

επ[ι της γης ε]-
σται δ[εδεμε]-
νε εν τ[ω ουρα]-
νω και οσα [ε]-
[λ]υσητ επι της
[γ]ες εσται λελυ-
[μ]ενα εν τω ου-
[ρ]ανω παλιν
[α]μιν αμην λε-
[γ]ω υμιν οτι
εαν δυο εζυμω-
[σ]υμθωνηψω-
[σιν]

Second Column (18:22)

[επτα]-
κις α[λ]λ[α εως εβδοα]-
μηκ[ο]ντα[κις ε]-
πτα δια [του]-
το ομοιωθ[η βα]-
σιλεια των [..]

Second fragment

First column

[αποδοθη]ναι (18:25)
[…] ουν ο δου- (18:26)
[λος] προσεκυνει
[αυ]τω λεγων κε
μακροθυμησο-
[ν ε]π εμε και παν-
[τα]

Second column

[ωφειλε]ν αυ- (18:28)
[τω εκατον δη]ναρια
[και κρ]ατησας
[α]υτον επνι-
Γεν λεγων α-
ποδος ει τι [ο]-
φειλεις πεσ[ων]- (18:29)
ουν ο συνδο[υ]-
λος αυτου π[α]-
ρεκαλει αυτ[ον]
λεγων μακρ[ο]-
θυμησον επ ε-
[μοι]

The Greek text of this codex Kurt Aland, with some hesitation, placed in Category III.

The manuscript was examined by Karl Wessely (1900), Joseph Karabacek, and C. R. Gregory (1887). Gregory gave for it siglum 058.

Currently the manuscript is dated by the INTF to the 4th century.

The codex is located at the Austrian National Library (Pap. G. 39782), in Vienna.

== See also ==
- List of New Testament uncials
- Textual criticism
