= Codex Zittaviensis =

Minuscule 664
- New Testament manuscript
- Name: Codex Zittaviensis
- Text: New Testament
- Date: 15th century
- Script: Greek
- Now at: Zittau
- Size: 31 cm by 20.2 cm
- Type: Byzantine text-type
- Category: V

The Codex Zittaviensis (No. 664 in the Gregory-Aland numbering), δ 502 (von Soden), dedicated as Rahlfs 44, is a Greek minuscule manuscript of the Old Testament and New Testament, on paper. Palaeographically it has been assigned to the 15th century. The manuscript has complex contents. Gregory labelled it by 664^{e}, 253^{a}, 303^{p}, and 106^{r}. Scrivener labelled it by 605^{e}, 233^{a}, 243^{p}, and 106^{r}.

== Description ==
The codex contains the entire of the New Testament, on 233 paper leaves (size 31 cm by 20.2 cm).

The text is written in one column per page, 30 lines per page. It contains Prolegomena, lists of the κεφαλαια are placed before every book, the text is divided according to the κεφαλαια, with τιτλοι, subscriptions at the end of books, and stichoi.

It contains also the text of the Old Testament (the whole codex has 775 leaves) with the books of 1 Esdras, 4 Maccabees, Judith, Tobit. The order of books: Old Testament (Genesis–Esther), Gospels, Book of Acts, Catholic epistles, Pauline epistles, and Apocalypse.

== Text ==
The Greek text of the codex is a representative of the Byzantine text-type. Hermann von Soden lists it to the textual family K^{r}. Kurt Aland placed it in Category V.

According to the Claremont Profile Method it belongs to the textual family K^{r} in Luke 1; 10; 20.

== History ==
Scrivener dated the manuscript to the 14th century, Gregory dated it to the 15th century. Currently the manuscript is dated by the INTF to the 15th century.

The manuscript once belonged to David Fleischmann († 1606), then to John Fleischmann, who in 1620 presented the manuscript to the Stadtbiliothek in Zittau.

It was examined and collated by Christian Frederick Matthaei in 1801-1802, but this collation had lost. Ernst von Dobschütz examined the manuscript. Gregory saw the manuscript in 1889.

The text of the Apocalypse was collated by Herman C. Hoskier.

Currently the manuscript is housed at the Stadtbibliothek (A 1), in Zittau.

== See also ==
- List of New Testament minuscules
- Biblical manuscript
- Textual criticism
- Minuscule 653
