= Minuscule 781 =

- New Testament manuscript
- Text: Gospels †
- Date: 14th century
- Script: Greek
- Now at: National Library of Greece
- Size: 22.5 cm by 15.5 cm
- Type: Byzantine text-type
- Category: V
- Note: –

Minuscule 781 (in the Gregory-Aland numbering), ε354 (von Soden), is a Greek minuscule manuscript of the New Testament written on paper. Palaeographically it has been assigned to the 14th century. The manuscript has no complex contents.

== Description ==
The codex contains the text of the four Gospels, on 199 paper leaves (size 22.5 cm by 15.5 cm), with some lacunae. The text is written in one column per page, 24 lines per page.

A later hand divided the text according to the κεφαλαια (chapters), whose numbers are given at the margin, but without their τιτλοι (titles) at the top.

It contains tables of the κεφαλαια (tables of contents) before each Gospel with a harmony, Argumentum, lectionary markings at the margin, incipits, αναγνωσεις, liturgical books (Synaxarion and Menologion), subscriptions at the end of each Gospel, and numbers of στιχοι.

== Text ==
The Greek text of the codex is a representative of the Byzantine text-type. Hermann von Soden classified it to the textual family K^{r}. Aland placed it in Category V.

According to the Claremont Profile Method it represent the textual family K^{r} in Luke 1 and Luke 20. In Luke 10 it has mixed Byzantine text. It is perfect member of the family.

The text of the Pericope Adulterae (John 7:53-8:11) is marked by an obelus.

== History ==
C. R. Gregory dated the manuscript to the 14th century. The manuscript is currently dated by the INTF to the 14th century.

Formerly it was housed in the monastery μεγαλων πυλων 14.

The manuscript was noticed in a catalogue from 1876.

It was added to the list of New Testament manuscripts by Gregory (781). Gregory saw the manuscript in 1886.

The manuscript is now housed at the National Library of Greece (110) in Athens.

== See also ==
- List of New Testament minuscules
- Biblical manuscript
- Textual criticism
- Minuscule 780
