= Family Kr =

Group of New Testament manuscripts

Family K^{r} (also known as Family 35) is a large group of the New Testament manuscripts. It belongs to the Byzantine text-type as one of the textual families of this group. The group contains no uncial manuscripts, but is represented by a substantial number of minuscules.

== Description ==
The group was discovered by Hermann von Soden in the late 19th century and designated by him with symbol K^{r}. According to Soden, the group is the result of an early 12th century attempt to create a unified New Testament text; the copying was controlled and the accuracy is unequalled in the history of the transmission of the New Testament text. Text K^{r} gained in popularity and became the most copied Greek text of the late Middle Ages. On the basis of the present location of most of the members of the group, it appears to have originated in the area of Constantinople or Mount Athos.

Majority of manuscript can be recognized by the distinctive marginal lectionary equipment which are different from the traditional Eusebian Canons. Von Soden used this markings to identify K^{r} members. The text of the group is also distinct and easy to identify.

One characteristic of these manuscripts is that the story of Jesus and the woman taken in adultery (John 7:53–8:11) is marked with obeli. Maurice Robinson argues that these marks do not represent a textual judgment, but are intended as a reminder that these verses are to be omitted when reading the Gospel for Pentecost (John 7:37–8:12).

David O. Voss confirmed the distinctiveness of the K^{r} group. He enumerated some readings typical for this group.

Dr. Wilbur N. Pickering generated a New Testament reading based on Family 35 and then created a translation of it into English called “The Sovereign Creator Has Spoken”.

== Wisse's group readings in Luke 1, 10, and 20 ==
The word before the bracket is the reading of the UBS edition; the readings which are not bold are those of the Textus Receptus.

Luke 1:44 — εν αγαλλιασει το βρεφος ] το βρεφος εν αγαλλιασει
Luke 1:55 — εις τον αιωνα ] εως αιωνος
Luke 1:63 — εστι(ν) ] εσται
Luke 10:4 — μη ] μηδε
Luke 10:12 — λεγω ] + δε
Luke 10:36 — πλησιον δοκει σοι ] δοκει σοι πλησιον
Luke 10:39 — τον λογον ] των λογων
Luke 10:41 — ειπεν αυτη ο κυριος (or Ιησους) ] ο κυριος ειπεν αυτη
Luke 20:1 — αρχιερεις ] ιερεις
Luke 20:5 — δια τι ] + ουν
Luke 20:9 — τις ] οmit
Luke 20:15 — αυτον ] οmit
Luke 20:19 — τον λαον ] οmit
Luke 20:28 — Μωυσης ] Μωσης
Luke 20:31 — επτα ] + και
Luke 20:34 — γαμιζονται ] εγκαμιζονται (ΤR reads: εγκαμισκονται)
Luke 20:37 — Μωυσης ] Μωσης.

== Members of the family ==
Wisse enumerated 221 manuscripts of this family: 18, 35, 47, 55, 56, 58, 66, 83, 128, 141, 147, 155, 167, 170, 182, 189, 201, 204, 214, 246, 285, 290, 361, 363, 386, 387, 394, 402, 479, 480, 483 (Luke corrector), 510, 511, 512, 516, 521, 547, 553, 558, 575, 586, 588, 594, 645, 660, 664, 673, 685, 689, 691, 694, 696, 757, 758, 763, 769, 781, 786, 789, 797, 802, 806, 824, 825, 845, 867, 897, 928, 932, 938, 940, 952, 953, 955, 959, 960, 962, 966, 973, 975, 1003, 1020, 1023, 1025, 1030, 1046, 1059, 1062, 1072, 1075, 1082, 1092, 1095, 1111, 1116, 1145, 1156, 1147, 1158, 1165, 1169, 1176, 1185, 1189, 1190, 1199, 1224, 1234, 1236, 1247, 1250, 1251, 1276, 1323, 1328, 1329, 1334, 1339, 1348, 1389, 1400, 1401, 1409, 1435, 1445, 1453, 1461, 1462, 1471, 1476, 1480, 1482, 1487, 1488, 1489, 1492, 1493, 1496, 1499, 1501, 1503, 1508, 1517, 1543, 1544, 1548, 1551, 1552, 1559, 1560, 1572, 1576, 1584, 1596, 1599, 1600, 1601, 1614, 1617, 1619, 1621, 1622, 1625, 1628, 1633, 1634, 1636, 1637, 1638, 1648, 1649, 1650, 1656, 1658, 1659, 1664, 1667, 1686, 1694, 1698, 1699, 1703, 1713, 1813, 2122, 2135, 2204, 2221, 2260, 2261, 2273, 2284, 2296, 2322, 2323, 2355, 2364, 2367, 2370, 2382, 2399, 2407, 2452, 2454, 2460, 2466, 2483, 2496, 2503, 2520, 2554, 2621, 2635, 2673, 2689, 2692, 2709, 2765, 2767.

== See also ==
- Family E
- Family Π
- Family K^{1}
- Family K^{x}
- Family 1424
