= Minuscule 204 =

- New Testament manuscript
- Text: New Testament (except Rev.)
- Date: 13th century
- Script: Greek
- Now at: Bologna University
- Size: 19.7 cm by 13.7 cm
- Type: Byzantine text-type
- Category: V
- Note: member of K^{r}

Minuscule 204 (in the Gregory-Aland numbering), δ 357 (Soden), is a Greek minuscule manuscript of the New Testament, on parchment. Paleographically it has been assigned to the 13th century.

== Description ==
The codex contains the text of the New Testament (except Book of Revelation) on 443 parchment leaves (size 19.7 cm by 13.1 cm). The order of books: Gospels, Acts of the Apostles, Catholic epistles, Pauline epistles. The text is written in one column per page, in 25 lines per page.

It has no the Epistula ad Carpianum. The text is divided according to the κεφαλαια (chapters), whose numbers are given at the margin, and the τιλοι (titles of chapters) at the top of the pages. There are no a division according to the Ammonian Sections.

It contains Prolegomena, Eusebian Canon tables, synaxaria, numbered αναγνωσεις (lessons), lectionary equipment at the margin, Menologion, subscriptions at the end of each book, numbers of stichoi, pictures, and the Euthalian Apparatus.

== Text ==
The Greek text of the codex is a representative of the Byzantine text-type. Hermann von Soden classified it to the textual family K^{x}. Aland placed it in Category V. According to the Claremont Profile Method it belongs to the textual family K^{r} in Luke 1 and Luke 20. In Luke 10 no profile was made. It belongs to the subgroup 35.

== History ==
Formerly the manuscript belonged to the monastery S. Salvator in Bologna.

It was examined by Birch, Scholz, Dean Burgon, and Oscar von Gebhardt. C. R. Gregory saw it in 1886.

Since 1867 it is housed at the Bologna University (2775), at Bologna.

== See also ==
- List of New Testament minuscules
- Biblical manuscript
- Textual criticism
