= Minuscule 141 =

Greek minuscule manuscript of the New Testament

- New Testament manuscript
- Text: New Testament
- Date: 13th century
- Script: Greek
- Now at: Vatican Library
- Size: 23.4 cm by 16.7 cm
- Type: Byzantine text-type
- Category: V
- Note: member of family K^{r}

Minuscule 141 (in the Gregory-Aland numbering), δ 408 (Soden), is a Greek minuscule manuscript of the New Testament, on parchment leaves. Palaeographically it has been assigned to the 13th century. The manuscript has complex contents. It has marginalia.

== Description ==
The codex contains the entire of the New Testament (Gospels, Acts, Catholic, Pauline epistles, Revelation) on 400 parchment leaves (size 23.4 cm by 16.7 cm), they are split in two volumes. The text is written in one column per page, 26 lines per page. The leaves are arranged in quaternions, but separately numbered for each volume.

The text is divided according to the κεφαλαια (chapters), whose numbers are given at the margin, and their τιτλοι (titles of chapters) at the top of the pages.

It contains lists of the κεφαλαια (tables of contents) before each book, lectionary equipment at the margin (for liturgical use), αναγνωσεις (lessons) at the margin, synaxaria, pictures, Menologion, subscriptions at the end of each book, with numbers of stichoi, and the Euthalian Apparatus.

== Text ==
The Greek text of the codex is a representative of the Byzantine text-type. Hermann von Soden classified it to the textual family K^{r}. Aland placed it in Category V. According to the Claremont Profile Method it belongs to the textual family K^{r} in Luke 1 and 20. In Luke 10 no profile was made. It belongs to subgroup 35.

== History ==
It was examined and described by Birch (about 1782), Scholz, C. R. Gregory (in 1886), and Herman C. Hoskier, who collated its text only in the Apocalypse.

It is currently housed at the Vatican Library (Vat. gr. 1160), at Rome.

== See also ==
- List of New Testament minuscules
- Biblical manuscript
- Textual criticism
