= Minuscule 825 =

- New Testament manuscript
- Text: Gospels
- Date: 13th century
- Script: Greek
- Found: 1729
- Now at: Biblioteca della Badia
- Size: 23.2 cm by 16.7 cm
- Type: Byzantine text-type
- Category: V
- Note: beautiful

Minuscule 825 (in the Gregory-Aland numbering), ε308 (von Soden), is a 13th-century Greek minuscule manuscript of the New Testament on parchment.

== Description ==
The codex contains the text of the four Gospels, on 337 parchment leaves (size 23.2 cm by 16.7 cm). The text is written in one column per page, 21 lines per page.

It contains Argumentum, tables of the κεφαλαια (chapters) before each Gospel, lectionary markings for liturgical use, incipits, αναγνωσεις (lessons), liturgical books: Synaxarion and Menologion, subscriptions at the end each of the Gospels, and pictures.

According to Scrivener it is a beautiful codex.

== Text ==
The Greek text of the codex is a representative of the Byzantine text-type. Hermann von Soden classified it to the textual family K^{x}. Aland placed it in Category V.

According to the Claremont Profile Method it represents textual family K^{r} in Luke 1, Luke 10, and Luke 20. It is a weak member of the cluster 189.

The text of the Pericope Adulterae (John 7:53-8:11) is marked by an obelus.

== History ==
C. R. Gregory dated the manuscript to the 13th century, other palaeographers dated it to the 11th century. Currently the manuscript is dated by the INTF to the 13th century.

The manuscript was brought from Corfu by Joseph Schirus, a monk, in 1729, and presented by him to the library in Grottaferrata. It was examined and described by Antonio Rocci in 1882. It was added to the list of New Testament manuscripts by Scrivener (623) and Gregory (825^{e}). Gregory saw it in 1886.

Currently the manuscript is housed at the Biblioteca della Badia (A' α. 2), in Grottaferrata.

== See also ==
- List of New Testament minuscules
- Biblical manuscript
- Textual criticism
- Minuscule 824
