= Minuscule 214 =

- New Testament manuscript
- Text: Gospels
- Date: 14th century
- Script: Greek
- Now at: Biblioteca Marciana
- Size: 24 cm by 15.5 cm
- Type: Byzantine
- Category: V
- Note: member of K^{r}

Minuscule 214 (in the Gregory-Aland numbering), ε 1401 (Soden), is a Greek minuscule manuscript of the New Testament, on paper. Paleographically it has been assigned to the 14th century. It has marginalia.

== Description ==
The codex contains a complete text of the four Gospels, on 227 paper leaves (size 24 cm by 15.5 cm). The text is written in one column per page, 27 lines per page.

The text is divided according to the κεφαλαια (chapters), whose numbers are given at the margin. There is no τιτλοι (titles) at the top of the pages. There is also a division according to the Ammonian Sections (no references to the Eusebian Canons).

It contains prolegomena, tables of the κεφαλαια (tables of contents), before each Gospel, αναγνωσεις (lessons), lectionary markings at the margin for liturgical reading, synaxaria, Menologion, and subscriptions at the end of each Gospel (with numbers of verses).

== Text ==
The Greek text of the codex is a representative of the Byzantine text-type. Hermann von Soden classified it to the textual family K^{r}. Aland placed it in Category V.

According to the Claremont Profile Method it belongs to the textual family K^{r} in Luke 1. In Luke 10 and Luke 20 it belongs to K^{x}.

== History ==
It was examined by Birch and Burgon. C. R. Gregory saw it in 1886.

It is currently housed at the Biblioteca Marciana (Gr. Z 543), at Venice.

== See also ==
- List of New Testament minuscules
- Biblical manuscript
- Textual criticism
