= Minuscule 588 =

- New Testament manuscript
- Text: Gospels †
- Date: 1321
- Script: Greek
- Now at: Biblioteca Ambrosiana
- Size: 21.5 cm by 15 cm
- Type: Byzantine text-type
- Category: V

Minuscule 588 (in the Gregory-Aland numbering), ε 229 (von Soden), is a Greek minuscule manuscript of the New Testament, on parchment. It is dated by a colophon to the year 1321. The manuscript is lacunose. It was labelled by Scrivener as 457.

== Description ==
The codex contains the text of the four Gospels on 221 parchment leaves (size 21.5 cm by 15 cm) with some lacunae (Matthew 10:27-13:19; 27:49-28:20; Luke 24:5-53 John 1:1-8; 4:51-7:3). The text is written in one column per page, 21 lines per page.

It contains the Eusebian Canon tables, prolegomena, lists of the κεφαλαια before each of the Gospela, numerals of the κεφαλαια (chapters) at the margin, the τιτλοι (titles), Ammonian Sections (Mark 241 – 16:20), the Eusebian Canons, lectionary markings, incipits, lists of αναγνωσεις, subscriptions, and pictures. The part of John 5 is much earlier than the rest of the manuscript.

== Text ==
The Greek text of the codex is a representative of the Byzantine text-type. Hermann von Soden classified it to the textual family K^{r}. Aland placed it in Category V. According to Claremont Profile Method it represents the textual family K^{r} in Luke 1 and Luke 20. In Luke 10 no profile was made.

== History ==
There is a note on folio 212 verso: ετελειωθη το παρον αγ[ιον] αυα[γγελιον] δια χειρος εμου του ευτελους ιω[α]ν[νου] ιερεως του περδικαρη και δια εξοδους κυρου γερμανου μοναχου επιερους ς ω κθ ινδ δ’ μη[νι] μαιω εις τας ις ημερα σα[ββα]τω.

The manuscript was added to the list of New Testament manuscripts by Scrivener. It was examined by Dean Burgon.

The manuscript currently is housed at the Biblioteca Ambrosiana (E. 63 sup.), at Milan.

== See also ==
- List of New Testament minuscules
- Biblical manuscript
- Textual criticism
