= Minuscule 673 =

- New Testament manuscript
- Text: Gospels †
- Date: 12th century
- Script: Greek
- Now at: Cambridge University Library
- Size: 20.7 cm by 15.8 cm
- Type: Byzantine text-type
- Category: V

Minuscule 673 (in the Gregory-Aland numbering), ε 1391 (von Soden), is a Greek minuscule manuscript of the New Testament, on parchment. Palaeographically it has been assigned to the 12th century. The manuscript is very lacunose. Scrivener labelled it by 619^{e}.

== Description ==
The codex contains the text of the four Gospels, on 164 parchment leaves (size 20.7 cm by 15.8 cm), with numerous lacunae (Matthew 1:1-10:42; 13:3-16; 27:24-37; Mark 14:21–Luke 3:16; 4:35-5:23; 7:4-15; Gospel of John). The text is written in one column per page, 19 lines per page.

The text is divided according to the κεφαλαια (chapters), which numerals are given at the margin. The tables of the κεφαλαια are placed before every Gospel. There is no the Ammonian Sections, a references to the Eusebian Canons, or the τιτλοι (titles). It contains a lectionary markings, αναγνωσεις (lessons), subscriptions, and στιχοι.

== Text ==
The Greek text of the codex is a representative of the Byzantine text-type. Hermann von Soden classified it to the textual family K^{r}. Kurt Aland placed it in Category V.

According to the Claremont Profile Method it represents family K^{r} in Luke 10; in Luke 1 and Luke 20 the manuscript is defective.

== History ==
Scrivener and Gregory dated it to the 12th or 13th century. Currently the manuscript is dated by the INTF to the 12th century.

The manuscript was bought in 1874. It was added to the list of New Testament manuscripts by Scrivener and Gregory. Gregory saw it in 1883. It was examined by Hort and Henry Brandshaw.

Actually the manuscript is housed at the Cambridge University Library (Add. Mss. 1837) in Cambridge.

== See also ==
- List of New Testament minuscules
- Biblical manuscript
- Textual criticism
