= Minuscule 757 =

- New Testament manuscript
- Text: New Testament †
- Date: 13th century
- Script: Greek
- Now at: National Library of Greece
- Size: 28 cm by 19.5 cm
- Type: Byzantine text-type
- Category: V

Minuscule 757 (in the Gregory-Aland numbering), δ304 (von Soden), is a Greek minuscule manuscript of the New Testament written on paper. Palaeographically it has been assigned to the 13th century. The manuscript has no complex contents. Scrivener labelled it as 846^{e}, 209^{a}, 399^{p}, and 146^{r}.

== Description ==
The codex contains the text of the New Testament, on 414 paper leaves (size 28 cm by 19.5 cm), with some lacunae. The texts of Matthew 1:1-2:11; 27:60-28:14; John 4:31-21:25 were supplied in the 16th century. The text of Matthew 15:20-23:27 is very defective. It has not Ephesians 4:28-6:24.

The text is written in one column per page, 24-28 lines per page.

The text is divided according to the κεφαλαια (chapters), whose numbers are given at the margin, but there are no their τιτλοι (titles) at the top of the pages. It contains Prolegomena, tables of the κεφαλαια (with a harmony), lectionary markings, incipits, αναγνωσεις (lessons), στιχοι, pictures, and Euthalian Apparatus. Synaxarion and Menologion were added in the 16th century.

The order of books: Gospels, Acts, Catholic epistles, Pauline epistles (Hebrews follows Philemon), Apocalypse.

== Text ==
The Greek text of the codex is a representative of the Byzantine text-type. Hermann von Soden classified it to the textual family K^{r}. Aland placed it in Category V.

According to the Claremont Profile Method it represents textual family K^{r} in Luke 1 and Luke 20. In Luke 10 no profile was made. It creates textual pair with 1075.

The text of the Pericope Adulterae is marked by an obelus.

== History ==
Scrivener dated the manuscript to the 15th century; Gregory dated the manuscript to the 13th or 14th century. The manuscript is currently dated by the INTF to the 13th century.

In 1843 it was brought from the monastery in Locris.

It was added to the list of New Testament manuscripts by Scrivener (846) and Gregory (757). Gregory saw the manuscript in 1886. The text of the Apocalypse was collated by Herman C. Hoskier.

The manuscript is now housed at the National Library of Greece (150) in Athens.

== See also ==
- List of New Testament minuscules
- Biblical manuscript
- Textual criticism
- Minuscule 758
