= Minuscule 394 =

- New Testament manuscript
- Text: New Testament (except Rev.)
- Date: 1330
- Script: Greek
- Now at: Biblioteca Vallicelliana
- Size: 23.5 cm by 16 cm
- Type: Byzantine text-type
- Category: V
- Note: member of K^{r}

Minuscule 394 (in the Gregory-Aland numbering), δ 460 (Soden), is a Greek minuscule manuscript of the New Testament, on parchment. Dated by a colophon to the year 1330. It was adapted for liturgical use.

== Description ==
The codex contains the text of the New Testament except Book of Revelation on 344 parchment leaves (23.5 cm by 16 cm). It is written in one column per page, in 29 lines per page, in silver ink.

It contains Argumentum, tables of the κεφαλαια (tables of contents) before each book, lectionary equipment on a margin, numbers of stichoi, synaxaria, Menologion, Euthalian Apparatus to the Acts, Catholic and Pauline epistles.

The order of books: Gospels, Acts, Catholic epistles, and Pauline epistles.

== Text ==
The Greek text of the codex is a representative of the Byzantine text-type. Aland placed it in Category V.

Hermann von Soden classified it to the textual family K^{r}. According to the Claremont Profile Method it belongs to the textual family K^{r} in Luke 1 and Luke 20. In Luke 10 no profile was made. It belongs to subgroup 35.

== History ==
The manuscript was written by Michael, a priest. The manuscript was added to the list of New Testament manuscripts by Scholz (1794-1852). Oscar von Gebhardt saw it in 1882, C. R. Gregory in 1886.

The manuscript is currently housed at the Biblioteca Vallicelliana (EF. 17) in Rome.

== See also ==
- List of New Testament minuscules
- Biblical manuscript
- Textual criticism
