= Minuscule 479 =

- New Testament manuscript
- Text: New Testament (except Rev.)
- Date: 13th century
- Script: Greek
- Now at: University of Birmingham
- Size: 17.5 cm by 13 cm
- Type: Byzantine text-type
- Category: V
- Note: family K^{r}

Minuscule 479 (in the Gregory-Aland numbering), δ 2491 (in the Soden numbering), is a Greek minuscule manuscript of the New Testament, on parchment. Palaeographically it has been assigned to the 13th century. Scrivener labelled it by number 542. It was adapted for liturgical use. Marginalia are not complete.

== Description ==
The codex contains the whole text of the New Testament except Book of Apocalypse on 231 parchment leaves (size 17.5 cm by 13 cm). It is written in one column per page, 29 lines per page. The order of books: Gospels, Acts of the Apostles, Catholic epistles, and Pauline epistles.

The text is divided according to the κεφαλαια (chapters), whose numbers are given at the margin, but there is no their τιτλοι (titles). The text of the Gospel has not additional division according to the smaller Ammonian Sections; no references to the Eusebian Canons.

It contains tables of κεφαλαια (tables of contents) before each book, lectionary markings at the margin (for liturgical use), αναγνοωσεις, subscriptions at the end of each book, numbers of στιχοι, and scholia of Chrysostom. It has the Euthalian Apparatus to the Acts, Catholic, and Pauline epistles.

It contains the Pericope Adulterae (John 7:53-8:11), but it was marked with an obelus.

== Text ==
The Greek text of the codex is a representative of the Byzantine text-type. Hermann von Soden classified it to the textual family Family K^{r}. Aland placed it in Category V. According to the Claremont Profile Method it represents textual family Family K^{r} in Luke 1, Luke 10, and Luke 20. It creates also a textual cluster 479.

== History ==
Currently the manuscript is dated by the INTF to the 13th century.

Formerly the manuscript belonged to the monastery του μετεωρου. The manuscript once belonged to Bishop of Caesarea Palaestina. It was bought by in 1837 by Christopher Wordsworth († 1885), Bishop of Lincoln, and bears a stamp Biblioteca Suchtelen (Russian Ambassador at Stockholm).

The manuscript was examined and collated by Scrivener (542), who published its text in 1852. The manuscript was added to the list of New Testament manuscripts by Scrivener. Gregory saw it in 1883. Gregory gave the number 479 to it.

The manuscript is currently housed in the Cadbury Research Library, University of Birmingham (Mingana Gr. 3).

== See also ==
- List of New Testament minuscules
- Biblical manuscript
- Textual criticism
