= Minuscule 402 =

Greek minuscule manuscript of the New Testament

- New Testament manuscript
- Text: Gospels
- Date: 14th century
- Script: Greek
- Now at: Biblioteca Nazionale Vittorio Emanuele III
- Size: 15.7 cm by 11.4 cm
- Type: Byzantine text-type
- Category: V

Minuscule 402 (in the Gregory-Aland numbering), ε 428 (in Soden's numbering), is a Greek minuscule manuscript of the New Testament, on parchment. Palaeographically it has been assigned to the 14th century. It has marginalia.

== Description ==
The codex contains a complete text of the 4 Gospels on 253 parchment leaves (15.7 cm by 11.4 cm). It is written in 1 column per page, in 24 lines per page.

It contains tables of the κεφαλαια (tables of contents) before each Gospel, lectionary markings at the margin, αναγνωσεις (lessons), subscriptions at the end of each Gospel, numbers of στιχοι, and pictures.

== Text ==
The Greek text of the codex is a representative of the Byzantine text-type. Hermann von Soden classified it to the textual family K^{r}. Aland placed it in Category V. According to the Claremont Profile Method it belongs to the textual family K^{r} in Luke 1 and Luke 20. In Luke 10 no profile was made. It belongs to subgroup 35.

== History ==
The manuscript was added to the list of New Testament manuscripts by Scholz (1794–1852). C. R. Gregory saw the manuscript in 1886.

The manuscript is currently housed at the Biblioteca Nazionale Vittorio Emanuele III (Ms. II. A. 5) in Naples.

== See also ==
- List of New Testament minuscules
- Biblical manuscript
- Textual criticism
