= Minuscule 55 =

- New Testament manuscript
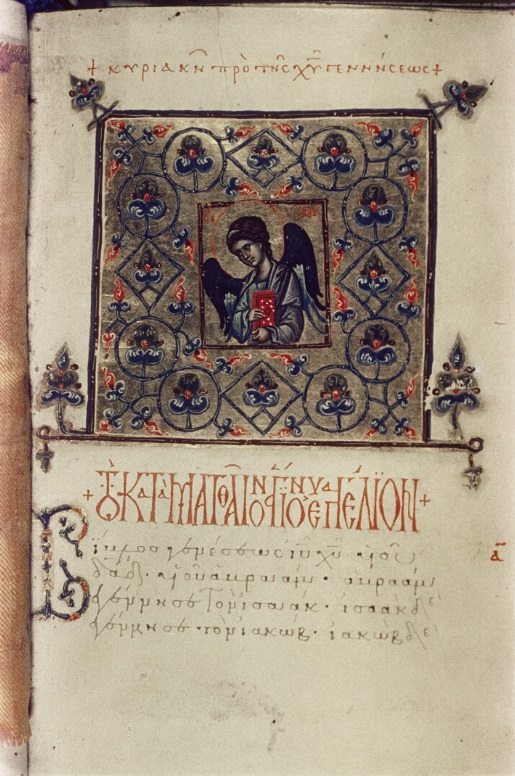
- Text: Gospels
- Date: 14th century
- Script: Greek
- Now at: Bodleian Library
- Size: 19.5 cm by 14 cm
- Type: Byzantine text-type
- Category: V
- Note: member of the K^{r} group

Minuscule 55 (in the Gregory-Aland numbering), ε 349 (Von Soden), is a Greek minuscule manuscript of the New Testament, on parchment leaves. Palaeographically it has been assigned to the 14th century. The manuscript has complex contents and some marginalia. It was adapted for liturgical use.

== Description ==
The codex contains a complete text of the four Gospels on 349 parchment leaves (size 19.5 cm by 14 cm). The text is written in one column per page, 21 lines per page. The capital letters in red. The text is divided according to the κεφαλαια (chapters), whose numbers are given at the margin.

It has Prolegomena to Matthew, lists of the κεφαλαια (tables of contents) are placed before each Gospel, lectionary equipment on the margin (incipits), αναγνωσεις (lessons), liturgical books with hagiographies (synaxaria and Menologion), subscriptions at the end of each Gospel, with numbers of stichoi, and beautiful pictures.

The manuscript containing also text Judges 6:1-24.

== Text ==
The Greek text of the codex is a representative of the Byzantine text-type. Hermann von Soden classified it to the textual family K^{r}. Aland placed it in Category V. According to the Claremont Profile Method it represents the textual family Family K^{r} in Luke 1 and Luke 20. In Luke 10 no profile was made.

== History ==
The manuscript was written by Γροιγοριου ιερομοναχου.

The manuscript was examined by Mill (as Selden 3), Grabe, Scholz, Tischendorf, and C. R. Gregory in 1883.

It is currently housed in at the Bodleian Library (Selden Supra 6), at Oxford.

== See also ==
- List of New Testament minuscules
- Biblical manuscript
- Textual criticism
