= Minuscule 824 =

- New Testament manuscript
- Text: New Testament
- Date: 14th century
- Script: Greek
- Now at: Biblioteca della Badia
- Size: 28.8 cm by 21.5 cm
- Type: Byzantine text-type
- Category: V
- Note: beautiful

Minuscule 824 (in the Gregory-Aland numbering), δ404 (von Soden), is a 14th-century Greek minuscule manuscript of the New Testament on paper. It has marginalia and liturgical books.

== Description ==
The codex contains the entire New Testament, on 366 paper leaves (size 28.8 cm by 21.5 cm). The text is written in one column per page, 28 lines per page.

The text of the four Gospels is divided according to the Ammonian Sections, whose numbers of the Ammonian Sections are given at the margin, but with some references to the Eusebian Canons. It contains Euthalian Apparatus.

It contains tables of the κεφαλαια before each sacred book (with a Harmony), portrait of Mark Evangelist, lectionary markings at the margin for liturgical use, incipits, αναγνωσεις, liturgical books with hagiographies: Synaxarion and Menologion, subscriptions at the end of each book, numbers of στιχοι, and Verse.

The order of books is usual: Gospels, Book of Acts, Catholic epistles, Pauline epistles (Hebrews followed Philemon), and Apocalypse.

According to Scrivener it is beautiful codex.

== Text ==
The Greek text of the codex is a representative of the Byzantine text-type. Hermann von Soden classified it to the textual family K^{r}. Aland placed it in Category V.

According to the Claremont Profile Method it represents textual family K^{r} in Luke 1, Luke 10, and Luke 20, as a perfect member of the family.

The text of the Pericope Adulterae (John 7:53-8:11) is marked by an obelus. In Revelation 5,10 it has textual variant ἡμᾶς. Other manuscripts have αὐτούς.

== History ==
C. R. Gregory dated the manuscript to the 14th century. Currently the manuscript is dated by the INTF to the 14th century.

The manuscript was examined by Antonio Rocci in 1882. It was added to the list of New Testament manuscripts by Scrivener (622) and Gregory (824^{e}, 267^{a}, 316^{p}, 113^{r}). Gregory saw it in 1886. In 1908 Gregory gave one siglum for it – 824.

Currently the manuscript is housed at the Biblioteca della Badia (A' α. 1), in Grottaferrata.

== See also ==
- List of New Testament minuscules
- Biblical manuscript
- Textual criticism
- Minuscule 825
