= Minuscule 147 =

Greek minuscule manuscript of the New Testament

- New Testament manuscript
- Text: Gospels
- Date: 13th century
- Script: Greek
- Now at: Vatican Library
- Size: 16.5 cm by 13 cm
- Type: Byzantine text-type
- Category: V
- Note: member of the K^{r}

Minuscule 147 (in the Gregory-Aland numbering), ε 401 (Soden), is a Greek minuscule manuscript of the New Testament, on parchment leaves. Palaeographically it has been assigned to the 13th century. Birch and F. H. A. Scrivener dated to the 11th century, C. R. Gregory dated to the 14th century.

== Description ==
The codex contains a complete text of the four Gospels on 355 parchment leaves (size 16.5 cm by 13 cm). The parchment is fine and white.

The text is written in one column per page, in 20 lines per page. The capital letters in red.

The text is divided according to the κεφαλαια (chapters), whose numbers are given at the margin of the text, and the τιτλοι (titles of chapters) at the top of the pages.

It contains Prolegomena, tables of the κεφαλαια (tables of contents) are placed before each Gospel, synaxaria, Menologion, subscriptions at the end of each Gospel, with numbers of στιχοι.

== Text ==
The Greek text of the codex is a representative of the Byzantine text-type. Hermann von Soden classified it to the textual family K^{r}. Aland placed it in Category V. According to the Claremont Profile Method it belongs to the textual family K^{r} in Luke 1, 10, and 20. It creates textual cluster with the codex 547 and 511 (in Luke 1).

== History ==
The manuscript was examined and described by Birch (about 1782) and Scholz. C. R. Gregory saw it in 1886.

It is currently housed at the Vatican Library (Pal. gr. 89), at Rome.

== See also ==
- List of New Testament minuscules
- Biblical manuscript
- Textual criticism
