= Minuscule 594 =

- New Testament manuscript
- Text: Gospels †
- Date: 14th century
- Script: Greek
- Now at: Biblioteca di S. Lazaro
- Size: 25 cm by 19.5 cm
- Type: Byzantine text-type
- Category: V

Minuscule 594 (in the Gregory-Aland numbering), ε 1402 (von Soden), is a Greek minuscule manuscript of the New Testament, on parchment. Palaeographically it has been assigned to the 14th century. The manuscript is lacunose. It was labelled by Scrivener as 470.

== Description ==
The codex contains the text of the four Gospels on 241 parchment leaves (size 25 cm by 19.5 cm) with lacunae. It is written in one column per page, 17 lines per page. It contains the lists of the κεφαλαια before every Gospel, Prolegomena to the Gospel of John, lectionary markings, incipits, subscriptions, and στιχοι; αναγνωσεις (lessons) were added by a later hand.

Contents: Matthew 1:1-Luke 23:15; 23:33-48.

== Text ==
The Greek text of the codex is a representative of the Byzantine text-type. Hermann von Soden classified it to the textual family K^{r}. Aland placed it in Category V. According to Wisse's Profile Method it represents the textual family K^{r} in Luke 1 and Luke 20. In Luke 10 no profile was made, Luke 1 is partly illegible.

== History ==
The manuscript was added to the list of New Testament manuscripts by F. H. A. Scrivener. It was examined by Dean Burgon.

The manuscript currently is housed at the Biblioteca di S. Lazzaro (1531), at Venice.

== See also ==
- List of New Testament minuscules
- Biblical manuscript
- Textual criticism
