= Minuscule 182 =

- New Testament manuscript
- Name: Codex Laurentianus
- Text: Gospels
- Date: 14th century
- Script: Greek
- Now at: Laurentian Library
- Size: 25.3 cm by 18 cm
- Type: Byzantine text-type
- Category: V
- Note: K^{r} marginalia

Minuscule 182 (in the Gregory-Aland numbering), ε 409 (Soden), is a Greek minuscule manuscript of the New Testament, on parchment. Paleographically it has been assigned to the 14th century. Scrivener dated it to the 12th century. It has marginalia.

== Description ==
The codex contains a complete text of the four Gospels on 226 elegant parchment leaves (size 25.3 cm by 18 cm). The text is written in one column per page, in 24 lines per page, in black and dark-brown ink, the capital letters in colours.

It contains tables of the κεφαλαια (tables of contents) before each Gospel, numbers of the κεφαλαια (chapters) at the margin, the τιτλοι (titles of chapters) at the top of the pages (only to John), and subscriptions (only to Luke).

== Text ==
The Greek text of the codex is a representative of the Byzantine text-type. Aland placed it in Category V. According to the Claremont Profile Method it belongs to the textual family K^{r} in Luke 1. In Luke 10 and Luke 20 it represents textual family Π^{a} as a weak member of this family.

== History ==
It is dated by the INTF to the 12th century.

The manuscript was examined by Birch, Scholz, and Burgon. C. R. Gregory saw it in 1886.

It is currently housed at the Laurentian Library (Plutei. VI. 11), at Florence.

== See also ==
- List of New Testament minuscules
- Biblical manuscript
- Textual criticism
