= Minuscule 387 =

- New Testament manuscript
- Text: Gospels
- Date: 12th century
- Script: Greek
- Now at: Vatican Library
- Size: 21.8 cm by 16.6 cm
- Type: Byzantine text-type
- Category: V
- Note: member of K^{r}

Minuscule 387 (in the Gregory-Aland numbering), ε 205 (Soden), is a Greek minuscule manuscript of the New Testament, on parchment. Paleographically it has been assigned to the 12th century. It has marginalia.

== Description ==
The codex contains a complete text of the four Gospels on 298 parchment leaves (21.8 cm by 16.6 cm). The text is written in one column per page, in 21 lines per page.

It contains Prolegomena, lectionary markings at the margin (for Church reading), subscriptions at the end of each Gospel, with numbers of stichoi.

== Text ==
The Greek text of the codex is a representative of the Byzantine text-type. Hermann von Soden classified it to the textual family K^{r}. Aland placed it in Category V. According to the Claremont Profile Method it belongs to the textual family K^{r} in Luke 1 and Luke 20. In Luke 10 no profile was made. It creates textual pair with 1471.

== History ==
The manuscript was added to the list of New Testament manuscripts by Scholz (1794–1852). It was examined and described by Giuseppe Cozza-Luzi. C. R. Gregory saw it in 1886.

The manuscript is currently housed at the Vatican Library (Ottob. gr. 204) in Rome.

== See also ==
- List of New Testament minuscules
- Biblical manuscript
- Textual criticism
