= Papyrus 3 =

New Testament papyrus fragment in Greek

- New Testament manuscript
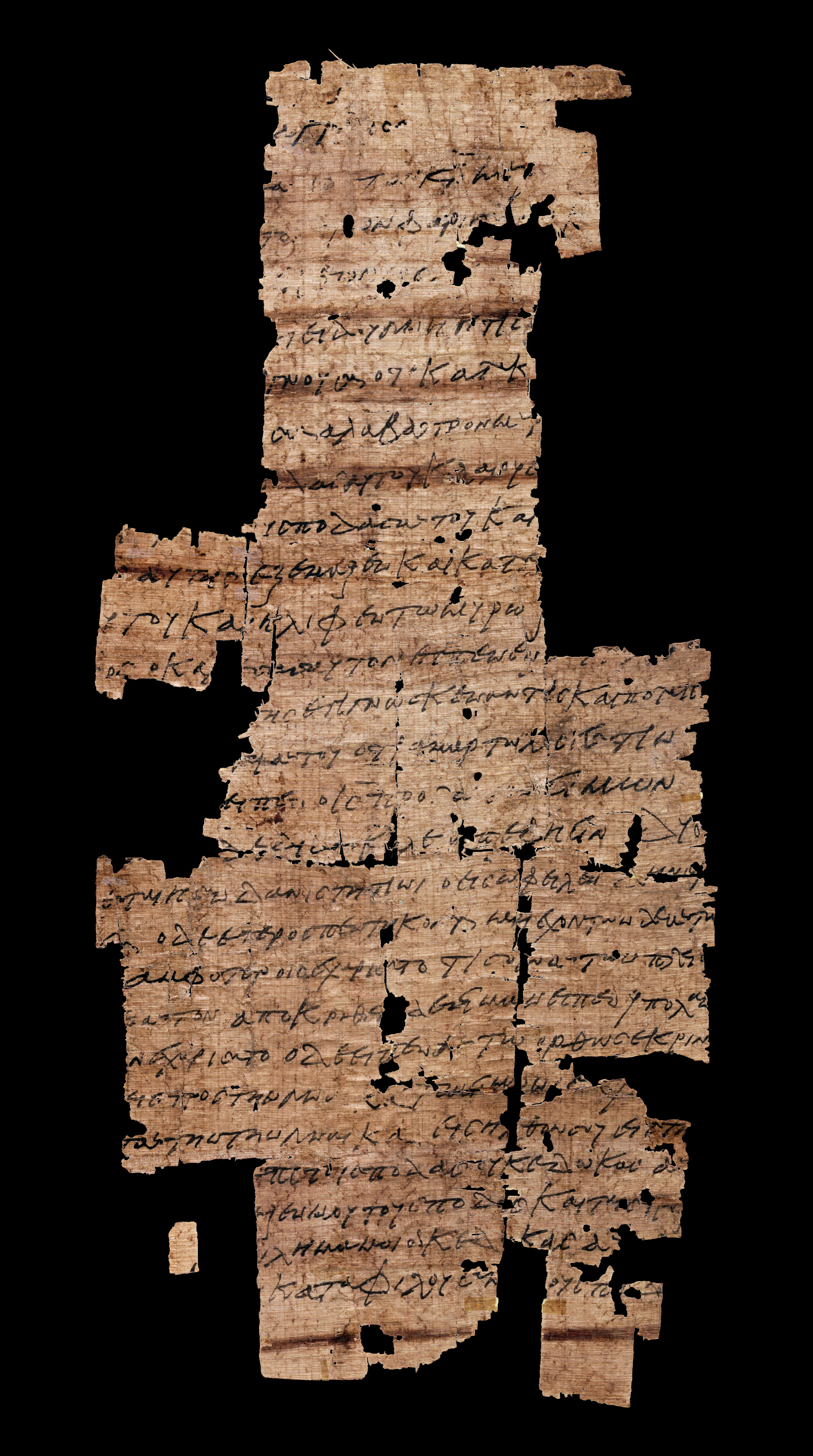
- Papyrus 3r (GA) 7,36–45
- Sign: 𝔓^{3}
- Text: Luke 7:36-45+10:38-42
- Date: 6th/7th century
- Script: Greek
- Now at: Vienna, Papyrus Collection of the Austrian National Library, Pap. G. 2323
- Size: 24.5 x 11.5 cm (25x18)
- Type: mixed
- Category: III

Papyrus 3, designated by 𝔓^{3} (in the numbering Gregory-Aland), is a small fragment of fifteen verses from the Gospel of Luke dating to the 6th/7th century. It is formed part of a lectionary. It is dated palaeographically to the 6th or 7th century.

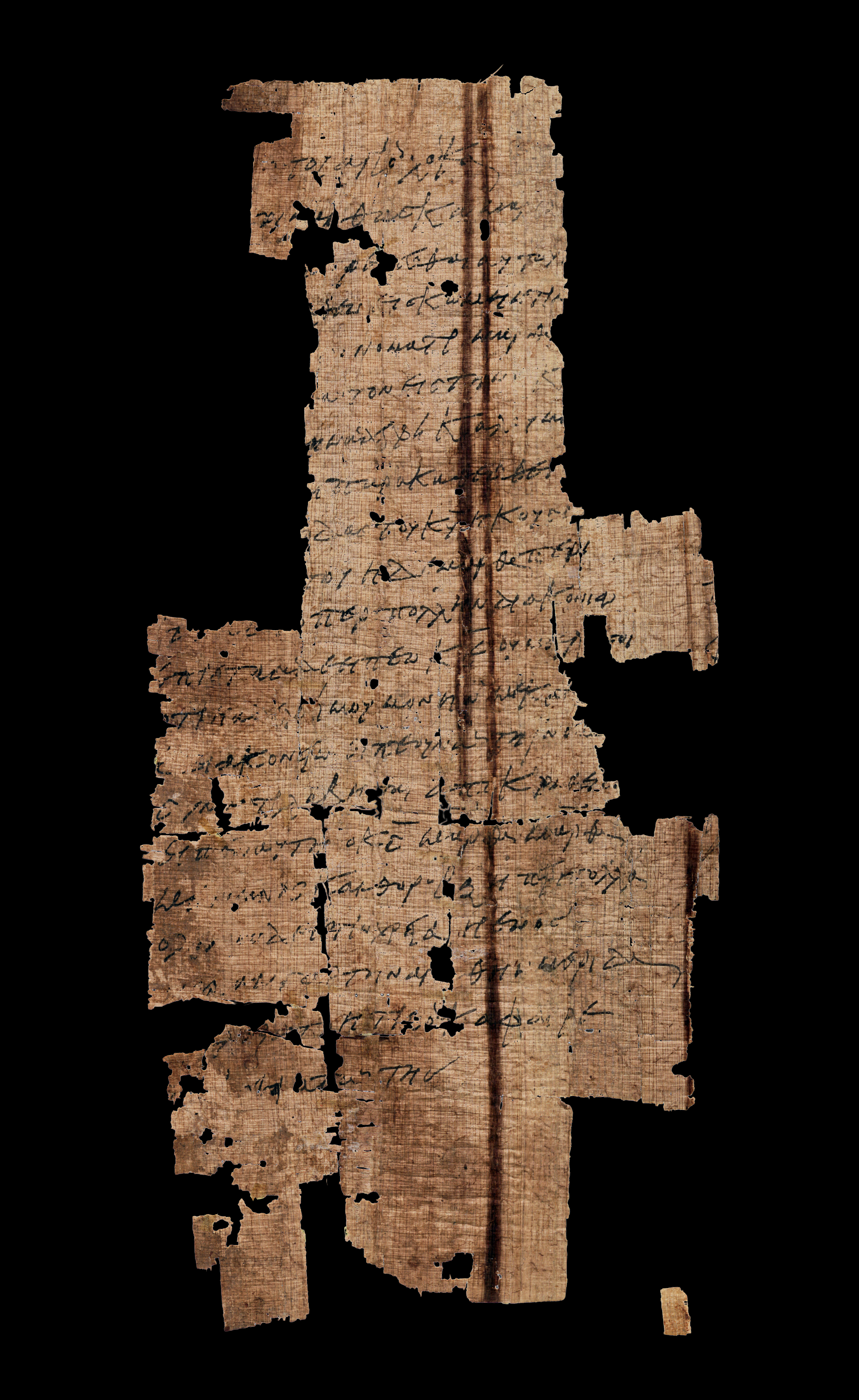
Papyrus 3v (GA) Luke 10, 38-42

The Greek text-type of this codex is a mixed. Aland placed it in Category III.

== Text ==
Luke 7:36

ΑΓΓ . . ΙΟ

ΤΟΝ Κ ̣̅ ΗΣο^{υ}

ΤΟΝ̣Τ̣Ω̣ΝΦΣΡΙΣ̣
Ε̣Λ̣ΘΩΝΕ̣ΙΣΤ̣
ΙΕΙΔΟΥΓΥΝΗΗΤΙΣΗ
ΓΝΟΥΣΑΟΤΙ̣ΚΑΤ^{Α}Κ
ΣΑΑΛΑΒΑΣΤΡΟΝΜΥΡ̣
Ο̣ΔΑΣΑΥΤΟΥΚΛΑΣΙΟΥΣ̣
ΥΣΠΟΔΑΣΑ^{Υ}ΤΟΥ ΚΑΙ
ΕΞΕΜΑΞΕΝΚΑΙΚΑΤΕ
ΗΛΙΦΕΝ ΤΩΜΥΡΩ
ΑΣΑΥΤΟΝΕΙΠΕΝΕ . . . . ΤΩ
ΗΣΕΓΙΓΝΩΣΚΕΝΑΝΤ̣ΙΣΚΑΙΠΟΤΑΠ
ΤΑΙΑΥΤΟΥΟΤΙΑ.ΑΡΤΩΛΟ̣ΣΕΣΤΙΝ
ΕΙΠΕΝ Ο Ι̅Σ̅ΠΡΟΣ̣Α.Τ̣Ο̣Ν̣ΣΙΜΩΝ
ΔΕΔΕΔΑ . . . ΛΕΕΙ̣ΠΕΝΦΗΣΙΝΔΥΟ
ΤΙΝΙΟΕΙΣΩ
Η̣ΚΟΝ̣ΤΑΜΗ̣
ΤΟΤΙΣΟΥ
ΔΕΣΙΜΩ̣
Π̣ΕΝΑΥΤΩ̣
Ω̣Σ̣Ι̣ΜΩ

Luke 10:38

ΝΤΟΥΑΓΙΟ^{υ}ΛΟ^{υ}ΚΑ

. . . . . . ΚΩΜΗ̣

ΡΕΥΕΣΘΑΙΑΥΤΟΥ
ΘΕΝΕΙΣΚΩΜΗΝΤΙΝ

== History ==
The text of the manuscript was published by Karl Wessely in 1882.

The manuscript is housed at the Austrian National Library (Pap. G. 2323).

== See also ==
- Luke 7, Luke 10
- List of New Testament papyri
