= Uncial 0237 =

- New Testament manuscript
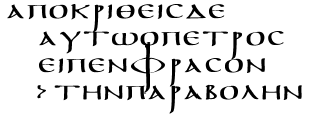
- Matthew 15:15 in the codex
- Text: Matthew 15:12-15,17-19
- Date: 6th-century
- Script: Greek-Coptic diglot
- Now at: Austrian National Library
- Size: 23 x 18 cm
- Type: mixed
- Category: III

Uncial 0237 (in the Gregory-Aland numbering), ε 014 (von Soden), is a Greek-Coptic uncial manuscript of the New Testament. Paleographically it has been assigned to the 6th-century.

== Description ==
The codex contains two small parts of the Gospel of Matthew 15:12-15,17-19, on one parchment leaf (23 cm by 18 cm). The text is written in two columns per page, 23 lines per page, in uncial letters.

It is a palimpsest.

Currently it is dated by the INTF to the 6th-century.

== Text ==
The Greek text of this codex is mixed. Aland placed it in Category III.

== History ==
Probably it was found in Fayyum.

The manuscript was examined by Karl Wessely, who published its text. It was added to the list of New Testament manuscripts by C. R. Gregory, who classified it as lectionary 349.

The manuscript was added to the list of the New Testament manuscripts by Kurt Aland in 1954.

It was digitised by the INTF.

Currently the codex is housed at the Austrian National Library (Pap. K. 8023) in Vienna.

== Salso27 ==
0237

- List of New Testament uncials
- Coptic versions of the Bible
- Textual criticism
