= Minuscule 786 =

- New Testament manuscript
- Text: Gospels
- Date: 14th century
- Script: Greek
- Now at: National Library of Greece
- Size: 18 cm by 12.5 cm
- Type: Byzantine text-type
- Category: V
- Note: –

Minuscule 786 (in the Gregory-Aland numbering), ε536 (von Soden), is a Greek minuscule manuscript of the New Testament written on parchment. Palaeographically it has been assigned to the 14th century. The manuscript has complex contents.

== Description ==
The codex contains the text of the four Gospels, on 288 parchment leaves (size 18 cm by 12.5 cm).

The text is written in one column per page, 21 lines per page.

The text is divided according to the κεφαλαια (chapters), whose numbers are given at the margin, with their τιτλοι (titles) at the top of the pages. There is also another division according to the smaller Ammonian Sections, with references to the Eusebian Canons.

It contains Prolegomena, tables of the κεφαλαια, lectionary markings at the margin, incipits, liturgical books Synaxarion and Menologion, subscriptions at the end of each Gospel.

== Text ==
The Greek text of the codex is a representative of the Byzantine text-type. Hermann von Soden classified it to the textual family K^{r}. Aland placed it in Category V.

According to the Claremont Profile Method it represent the textual family K^{r} in Luke 1 and Luke 10. In Luke 20 it represents K^{x}.

== History ==
According to Gregory the manuscript was written in the 14th century. The manuscript is currently dated by the INTF to the 14th century.

Formerly it was housed in the monastery μεγαλων πυλων 22. The manuscript was noticed in catalogue from 1876.

It was added to the list of New Testament manuscripts by Gregory (786). Gregory saw the manuscript in 1886.

The manuscript is now housed at the National Library of Greece (125) in Athens.

== See also ==
- List of New Testament minuscules
- Biblical manuscript
- Textual criticism
- Minuscule 785
