= Minuscule 128 =

- New Testament manuscript
- Text: Gospels
- Date: 13th century
- Script: Greek
- Now at: Vatican Library
- Size: 32.2 cm by 24.4 cm
- Type: Byzantine text-type
- Category: V
- Note: member of K^{r}

Minuscule 128 (in the Gregory-Aland numbering), ε 304 (Soden), is a Greek minuscule manuscript of the New Testament, on parchment leaves. Palaeographically it has been assigned to the 13th century. It has marginalia.

== Description ==
The codex contains a complete text of the four Gospels on 370 parchment leaves (size 32.2 cm by 24.4 cm). The text is written in one column per page, 18 lines per page. Parchment is white, ink is brown, the initial letters in red. The handwriting is like that in minuscule 80.

The text is divided according to the κεφαλαια (chapters), whose numbers are given at the margin, and their τιτλοι (titles of chapters) at the top of the pages.

It contains prolegomena, Argumentum, tables of the κεφαλαια (tables of contents) before each Gospel with a harmony, subscriptions at the end of each Gospel, and numbers of στιχοι. There is room for pictures.

== Text ==
The Greek text of the codex is a representative of the Byzantine text-type. Hermann von Soden classified it to the textual family K^{r}. Aland placed it in Category V.

According to the Claremont Profile Method it belongs to the textual family K^{r} in Luke 1, Luke 10, and Luke 20. It creates textual cluster 128.

The text of the Pericope Adulterae (John 7:53-8:11) is marked as a doubtful.

== History ==
The manuscript was examined by Birch (about 1782), who dated it to the 11th century. Gregory saw it in 1886.

It is currently housed at the Vatican Library (Vat. gr. 356), at Rome.

== See also ==
- List of New Testament minuscules
- Biblical manuscript
- Textual criticism
