= Minuscule 386 =

- New Testament manuscript
- Text: New Testament
- Date: 14th century
- Script: Greek
- Now at: Vatican Library
- Size: 29 cm by 21 cm
- Type: Byzantine text-type
- Category: V
- Note: member of K^{r}

Minuscule 386 (in the Gregory-Aland numbering), δ 401 (Soden), is a Greek minuscule manuscript of the New Testament, on parchment. Paleographically it has been assigned to the 14th century. It has complex context and some marginalia.

== Description ==
The codex contains the text of the New Testament on 393 parchment leaves (29 cm by 21 cm). It is written in one column per page, in 24 lines per page.

It contains the Eusebian Canon tables, lists of the κεφαλαια (tables of contents) before each sacred book, τιτλοι (titles of chapters) at the top of the pages, lectionary markings at the margin, αναγνωσεις (lessons), subscriptions at the end of each sacred book, numbers of στιχοι, Synaxarion, Menologion, and Euthalian Apparatus to Catholic and Pauline epistles.

The order of books: Gospels, Acts, Catholic epistles, Pauline epistles, and Book of Revelation. The text of the Pericope Adulterae (John 7:53-8:11) is marked by an obelus.

== Text ==
The Greek text of the codex is a representative of the Byzantine text-type. Hermann von Soden classified it to the textual family K^{r}. Aland placed it in Category V. According to the Claremont Profile Method it represents the textual family K^{r} in Luke 1 and Luke 20. It belongs to the textual cluster 167. In Luke 10 no profile was made.

== History ==
Formerly the manuscript, together with 388, 389, and 390 belonged to Giovanni Angelo Herzog von Altaemps († 1627).

The manuscript was added to the list of New Testament manuscripts by Scholz (1794-1852). It was examined and described by Giuseppe Cozza-Luzi. C. R. Gregory saw it in 1886.

It was examined by Ernesto Feron and Fabiano Battaglini (like minuscule 878 and 880).

The manuscript is currently housed at the Vatican Library (Ottob. gr. 66) in Rome.

== See also ==
- List of New Testament minuscules
- Biblical manuscript
- Textual criticism
