= Minuscule 789 =

- New Testament manuscript
- Text: Gospels †
- Date: 14th century
- Script: Greek
- Now at: National Library of Greece
- Size: 23 cm by 17.5 cm
- Type: Byzantine text-type
- Category: V
- Note: –

Minuscule 789 (in the Gregory-Aland numbering), ε396 (von Soden), is a Greek minuscule manuscript of the New Testament written on parchment. Palaeographically it has been assigned to the 14th century. The manuscript has no complex contents.

== Description ==
The codex contains the text of the four Gospels, on 250 parchment leaves (size 23 cm by 17.5 cm), with some lacunae. The texts of Matthew 1:1-5:40; John 19:12-21:25 were supplied by a later hand in the 16th century.

The text is written in one column per page, 20 lines per page.

The text is divided according to the κεφαλαια (chapters), whose numbers are given at the margin, but there is no their τιτλοι (titles) at the top of the pages.

It contains tables of the κεφαλαια (tables of contents) before each Gospel with a Harmony, lectionary markings at the margin, incipits, αναγνωσεις (lessons), (Synaxarion, Menologion from 16th century), subscriptions at the end of each Gospel, with numbers of στιχοι.

== Text ==
The Greek text of the codex is a representative of the Byzantine text-type. Hermann von Soden classified it to the textual family K^{r}. Aland placed it in Category V.

According to the Claremont Profile Method it represent the textual family K^{r} in Luke 1 and Luke 20. In Luke 20 no profile was made.

The text of the Pericope Adulterae is athetized by scribe in margin with horizontal dashes (folio 218b–219a).

== History ==
According to Gregory the manuscript was written in the 14th century. The manuscript is currently dated by the INTF to the 14th century.

Formerly it was housed in the monastery μεγαλων πυλων 27. The manuscript was noticed in catalogue from 1876.

It was added to the list of New Testament manuscripts by Gregory (789). Gregory saw the manuscript in 1886.

The manuscript is now housed at the National Library of Greece (134) in Athens.

== See also ==
- List of New Testament minuscules
- Biblical manuscript
- Textual criticism
- Minuscule 788
