= Minuscule 167 =

- New Testament manuscript
- Text: Gospels
- Date: 13th century
- Script: Greek
- Now at: Vatican Library
- Size: 12.5 cm by 8.5 cm
- Type: Byzantine text-type
- Category: V
- Note: member of K^{r} marginalia

Minuscule 167 (in the Gregory-Aland numbering), ε 305 (Soden), is a Greek minuscule manuscript of the New Testament, on parchment. Palaeographically it has been assigned to the 13th century. It has marginalia.

== Description ==
The codex contains a complete text of the four Gospels on 264 parchment leaves (size 12.5 cm by 8.5 cm). The text is written in one column per page, in 25 lines per page. The initial letters in gold, the ink is brown.

The text is divided according to the κεφαλαια (chapters), whose numbers are given at the margin, and the τιτλοι (titles) at the top of the pages.

It contains lists of the κεφαλαια (lists of contents) before each Gospel, subscriptions at the end of each Gospel, and pictures (added by later hand).

The Pericope Adulterae (John 7:53-8:11) is marked by an obelus.

== Text ==
The Greek text of the codex is a representative of the Byzantine text-type. Hermann von Soden classified it to the textual family K^{r}. Aland placed it in Category V.

According to the Claremont Profile Method it belongs to the textual family K^{r} in Luke 1 and Luke 20. In Luke 10 no profile was made. It creates textual cluster 167.

== History ==
It was examined by Birch (about 1782) and Scholz (1794–1852). C. R. Gregory saw it in 1886.

It is currently housed at the Vatican Library (Barb. gr. 287), at Rome.

== See also ==
- List of New Testament minuscules
- Biblical manuscript
- Textual criticism
