= Minuscule 389 =

- New Testament manuscript
- Text: Gospels
- Date: 11th century
- Script: Greek
- Now at: Vatican Library
- Size: 17.1 cm by 13.6 cm
- Category: none
- Note: marginalia

Minuscule 389 (in the Gregory-Aland numbering), ε 105 (Soden), is a Greek minuscule manuscript of the New Testament, on parchment. Paleographically it has been assigned to the 11th century. It has marginalia.

== Description ==
The codex contains the text of the four Gospels on 197 parchment leaves (17.1 cm by 13.6 cm), written in one column per page, 23 lines per page.

The text is divided according to the κεφαλαια (chapters), whose numbers are given at the margin, with their τιτλοι (titles of chapters) at the top and the bottom of the pages (with a harmony). There is also a division according to the Ammonian Sections, with references to the Eusebian Canons (written below Ammonian Section numbers).

It contains the Eusebian Canon tables, lists of the κεφαλαια (tables of contents) before each Gospel, subscriptions at the end of each Gospel, numbers of στιχοι, and pictures.

== Text ==
Hermann von Soden classified it to the textual family Ι^{κ}. Kurt Aland the Greek text of the codex did not place in any Category.

According to the Claremont Profile Method it belongs to the textual family Πa in Luke 1, Luke 10, and Luke 20, as a weak member.

== History ==
The manuscript together with 386, 388, and 390 belonged to Giovanni Angelo Herzog von Altaemps (died 1627).

The manuscript was added to the list of New Testament manuscripts by Scholz (1794–1852). It was examined and described by Giuseppe Cozza-Luzi. C. R. Gregory saw it in 1886.

As of 2009, the manuscript is housed at the Vatican Library (Ottob. gr. 297) in Rome.

== See also ==
- List of New Testament minuscules
- Biblical manuscript
- Textual criticism
