= Minuscule 388 =

- New Testament manuscript
- Text: Gospels
- Date: 13th century
- Script: Greek
- Now at: Vatican Library
- Size: 21.3 cm by 15.7 cm
- Type: Byzantine text-type
- Category: V
- Note: marginalia

Minuscule 388 (in the Gregory-Aland numbering), ε 302 (Soden), is a Greek minuscule manuscript of the New Testament, on parchment. Palaeographically it has been assigned to the 13th century. It has marginalia.

== Description ==
The codex contains the text of the four Gospels on 315 parchment leaves (21.3 cm by 15.7 cm). It is written in one column per page, in 21 lines per page.

The text is divided according to the κεφαλαια (chapters), whose numbers are given at the margin, and their τιτλοι (titles of chapters) at the top of the pages. There is also a division according to the smaller Ammonian Sections (in Mark 233 Sections, the last in 16:8), with references to the Eusebian Canons (written below Ammonian Section numbers).

It contains the tables of the κεφαλαια (tables of contents) before each Gospel, incipits, αναγνωσεις (lessons), Synaxarion, Menologion, subscriptions at the end of each Gospel, numbers of stichoi, and pictures. It is ornamented with silver.

== Text ==
The Greek text of the codex is a representative of the Byzantine text-type. Hermann von Soden classified it to the textual family K^{x}. Aland placed it in Category V.

According to the Claremont Profile Method it represents textual family Π171 in Luke 1 (weak), Luke 10, and Luke 20. It creates textual pair with 2584.

The text of the Pericope Adulterae (John 7:53-8:11) is omitted.

== History ==
It was variously dated in the past (11th, 12th, 13th century). Currently it is dated by the INTF to the 13th century.

The manuscript once belonged to Alexius and Theodora, then, together with 386, 389, and 390 belonged to Giovanni Angelo Herzog von Altaemps († 1627).

The manuscript was added to the list of New Testament manuscripts by Scholz (1794–1852). It was examined and described by Giuseppe Cozza-Luzi. C. R. Gregory saw it in 1886.

The manuscript is currently housed at the Vatican Library (Ottob. gr. 212) in Rome.

== See also ==
- List of New Testament minuscules
- Biblical manuscript
- Textual criticism
