= Minuscule 390 =

- New Testament manuscript
- Text: New Testament (except Rev.)
- Date: 1281/1282
- Script: Greek
- Now at: Vatican Library
- Size: 22 cm by 15.5 cm
- Type: Byzantine text-type
- Category: V
- Note: marginalia

Minuscule 390 is a Greek minuscule manuscript of the New Testament, made of parchment. It is designated by the siglum 390 in the Gregory-Aland numbering of New Testament manuscripts, and δ 366 in the von Soden numbering of New Testament manuscripts. It is dated by a colophon to the year 1281 or 1282. It has marginal notes.

== Description ==
The manuscript is a codex (precursor to the modern book format), containing the entire text of the New Testament except the Book of Revelation on 336 parchment leaves (sized 22 cm by 15.5 cm). The text is written in one column per page, in 21 lines per page.

The text is divided according to the chapters (known as κεφαλαια / kephalaia), whose numbers are given in the margin, and their titles (known as τιτλοι / titloi) written at the top of the pages. There is also a division according to the Ammonian Sections (241 in Mark, the last in 16:20), with references to the Eusebian Canons written below the Ammonian Section numbers.

It contains the Epistle to Carpian, Eusebian Canon tables, prolegomena, tables of contents (also known as κεφαλαια) before each book, lectionary markings in the margin, incipits, a Synaxarion, a Menologion, subscriptions at the end of each book, and the Euthalian Apparatus to the Pauline epistles. It has marginal notes.

The order of books is as follows:

- Gospels
- Acts
- Pauline epistles
- Catholic epistles

== Text ==
The Greek text of the codex is considered to be a representative of the Byzantine text-type. Textual critic Hermann von Soden classified it to the textual family K^{x}. Biblical scholar Aland placed it in Category V of his New Testament manuscript classification system. Category V manuscripts are described as "manuscripts with a purely or predominantly Byzantine text."

According to the Claremont Profile Method (a specific anaylsis of textual data), it belongs to the textual family K^{x} in Luke 1 and Luke 20, and belongs to the textual cluster 74. In Luke 10 no profile was made.

== History ==
The earliest history of the manuscript is unknown. In 1359 the manuscript was on the island of Scio. Together with 386, 388, and 389, the manuscript belonged to Giovanni Angelo Herzog von Altaemps († 1627).

The manuscript was added to the list of New Testament manuscripts by textual critic Johann M. A. Scholz (1794–1852). It was examined and described by Giuseppe Cozza-Luzi. Biblical scholar Caspar René Gregory saw it in 1886. The manuscript is currently housed at the Vatican Library (shelf number Ottob. gr. 381) in Rome.

== See also ==
- Minuscule 391
- Minuscule 389
- List of New Testament minuscules
- Biblical manuscript
- Textual criticism
