= Karakallou Monastery =

Eastern Orthodox monastery, Mount Athos, Greece

- Μονή Καρακάλλου
- Location within Mount Athos
- Interactive map of Karakallou Monastery

Monastery information
- Full name: Holy Monastery of Karakallou
- Established: early 11th century
- Dedication: St. Peter and St. Paul
- Diocese: Mount Athos

People
- Founder: Elder Karakalas
- Prior: Archimandrite Elder Philotheus
- Important associated figures: Prince of Wallachia John-Peter

Site
- Location: Mount Athos, Greece
- Coordinates: 40.2239°N 24.3083°E
- Visible remains: skull of the Apostle Bartholomew and of St Christopher, and a fragment of the True Cross
- Public access: Men only

The Karakallou Monastery (Greek: Μονή Καρακάλλου) is an Eastern Orthodox monastery at the monastic state of Mount Athos in Greece. It stands on the south-eastern side of the peninsula and ranks eleventh in the hierarchy of the Athonite monasteries. The monastery has 50 working monks, and its library holds 330 manuscripts, and about 3,000 printed books.

== History ==
It was founded in the 11th century. In the 13th century, as a result of the activity of pirates and Latins, Karakallou was totally deserted.

By the end of the 15th century according to the Ruthenian pilgrim Isaiah, the monastery was Albanian. The monastery was rebuilt in the 16th century by Moldavian voievod Peter IV Rareș.

== Nearby sites ==
Located near Karakallou Monastery, the Kathisma of St. Efstathios, or Mylopotamos, is a kathisma (cell) belonging to the Monastery of Great Lavra. It was founded by St. Athanasius to serve as a place of convalescence for monks. It is a complex with a defensive tower and vineyards. Patriarch Joachim III of Constantinople, also rested here in the 19th century. Today it is used as a winery and is known for its excellent quality wine.
