= Luke 10 =

- ← chapter 9 chapter 11 →
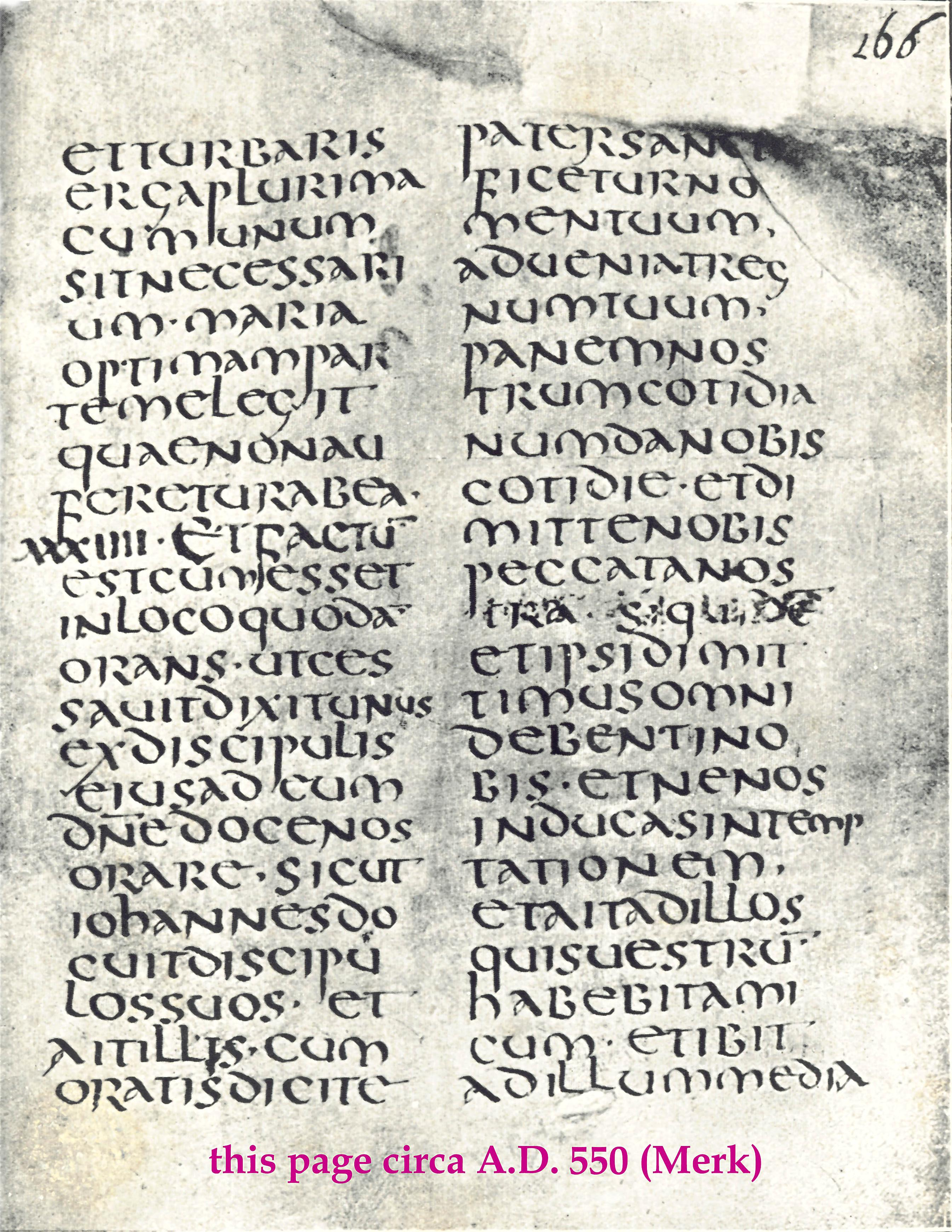
- The Latin text of Luke 10:41–11:5 in Codex Claromontanus V, from 4th or 5th century
- Book: Gospel of Luke
- Category: Gospel
- Christian Bible part: New Testament
- Order in the Christian part: 3

Luke 10 is the tenth chapter of the Gospel of Luke in the New Testament of the Christian Bible. It records the sending of seventy disciples by Jesus, the famous parable about the Good Samaritan, and his visit to the house of Mary and Martha. This Gospel's author, who also wrote the Acts of the Apostles, is not named but is uniformly identified by early Christian tradition as Luke the Evangelist.

== Text ==
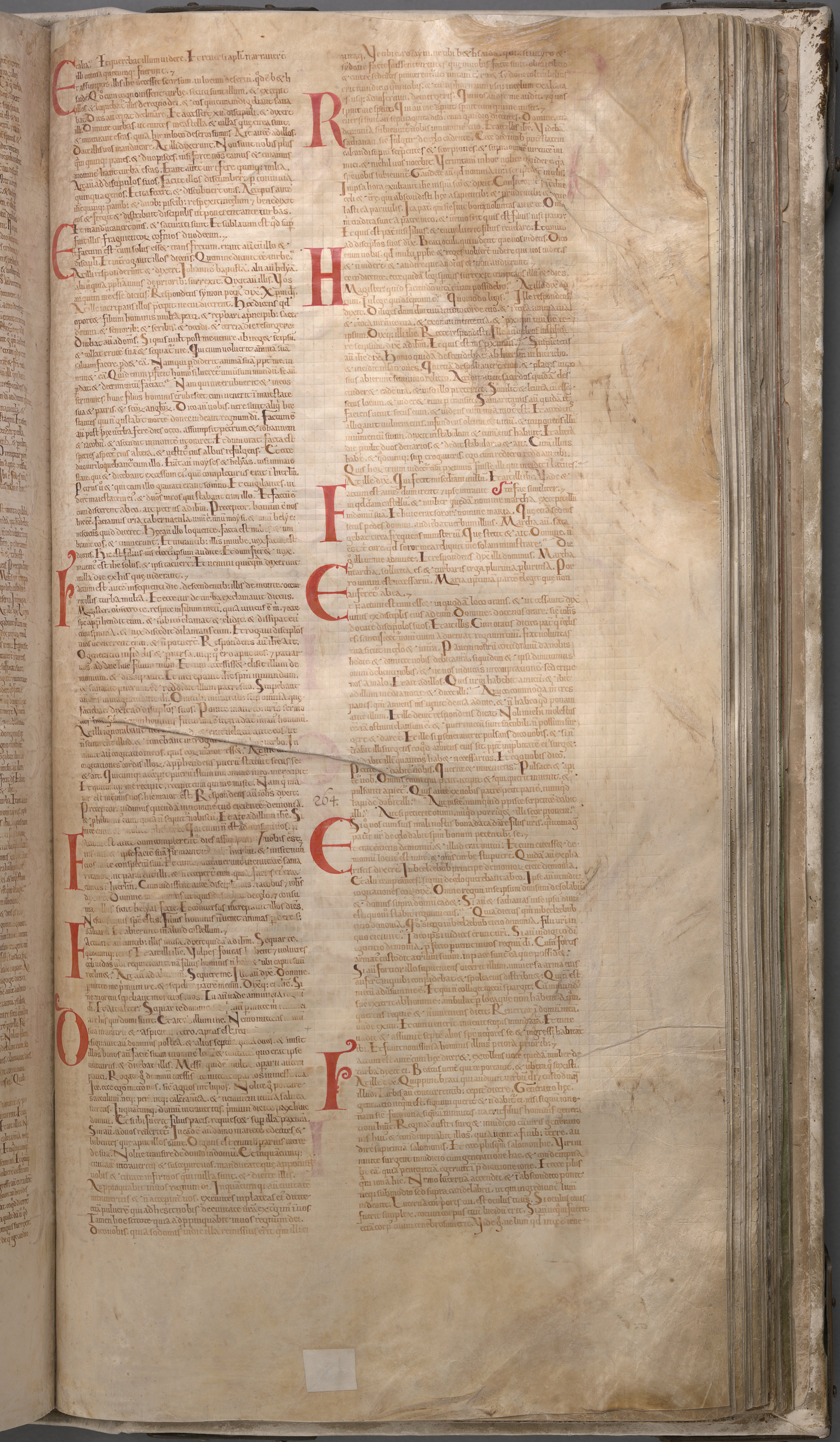
The Latin text of Luke 9:9–11:35 in Codex Gigas (13th century)

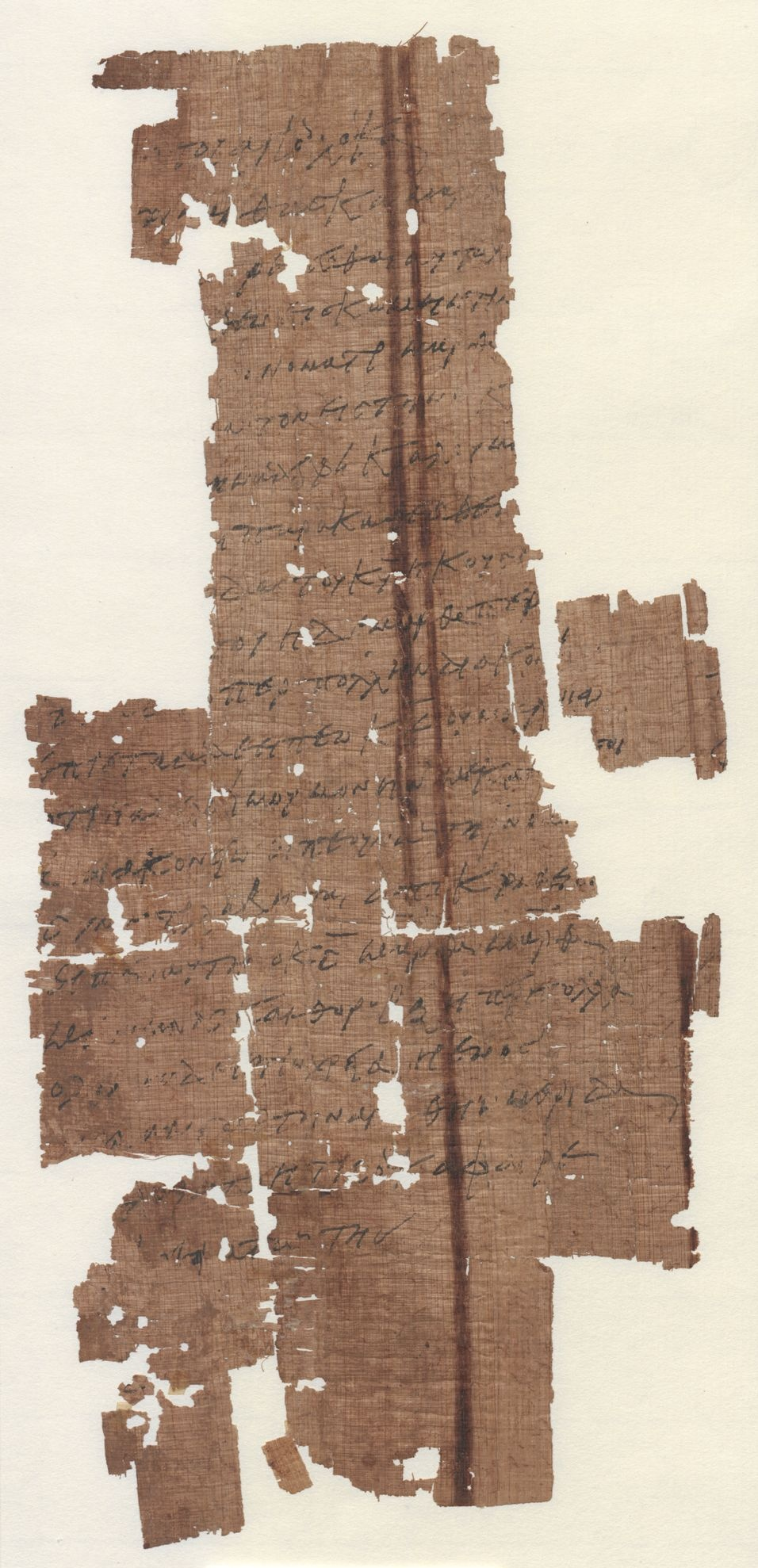
Luke 10:38–42 in Papyrus 3 (6th/7th century)

The original text was written in Koine Greek. This chapter is divided into 42 verses. Some early manuscripts containing the text of this chapter are:

- Papyrus 75 (written about AD 175–225)
- Papyrus 45 (c. 250)
- Codex Vaticanus (325–350)
- Codex Sinaiticus (330–360)
- Codex Bezae (c. 400)
- Codex Washingtonianus (c. 400)
- Codex Alexandrinus (400–440)
- Codex Ephraemi Rescriptus (c. 450)
- Papyrus 3 (6th/7th century; extant verses 38–42).

== Old Testament references ==
- Luke 10:19: Psalm 91:13
- Luke 10:27: Leviticus 19:18

== Narrative of the Seventy and their return ==
Luke's gospel is the only one which includes this narrative. Protestant theologian Heinrich Meyer calls this section (verses 1–16) the "Narrative of the Seventy" and links it to the earlier account of the sending out of advance messengers in Luke 9:52. The return of the seventy concludes this section (verses 17–20). This passage includes Jesus's assertion that "the laborer is worthy of his wages", which is reflected in similar wording in 1 Timothy 5:18:

For the Scripture says, "You shall not muzzle an ox while it treads out the grain", and "The laborer is worthy of his wages".

The first of these statements is found at Deuteronomy 25:4, but the second statement is not found in the Old Testament, leading to the suggestion that the author of the letter to Timothy may have referred to Luke or the equivalent verse in Matthew.

Some manuscripts refer to seventy-two others. The manuscript evidence "is fairly divided, and it is not easy to conclude what Luke actually wrote. The Textus Receptus refers to 70, but other critical texts note the word δύο, duo, as a potential addition. Both alternatives are linked to the two Old Testament episodes which Eric Franklin considers potentially to have been reflected in Luke's account:

- Genesis 10 has a list of the seventy nations of the world, although the Septuagint (LXX) has seventy-two.
- Numbers 11 speaks of Moses choosing seventy elders upon whom a portion of the spirit that was upon him would rest, but since two others shared the gift, this could be taken as seventy-two.

=== Verse 3 ===
Go your way; behold, I am sending you out as lambs in the midst of wolves.Luke 10:3: English Standard Version

While there may literally have been wolves in the path of the seventy, the warning may also be understood figuratively as referring to "personal, communal and structural" obstacles which stand in the way of evangelisation.

=== Verse 9 ===
And heal the sick there, and say to them, "The kingdom of God has come near to you".

Franklin suggests that in this verse, the "embrace" of the kingdom of God reaches those who respond favourably to the message. Kenneth N. Taylor, in his paraphrase of Luke, has the offer of the kingdom given especially to those who are healed:

Heal the sick; and as you heal them, say, "The Kingdom of God is very near you now".

Verse 11 repeats "that the kingdom of God has come near you", but this verse also points to it being near those who reject the messengers.

=== Verse 16 ===
"He who hears you hears Me, he who rejects you rejects Me, and he who rejects Me rejects Him who sent Me."

Meyer treats this verse as confirmation in principle that Jesus placed on equal grounds the cities which reject the seventy and those which reject Himself. In the second part, the saying rises to a climax: a deepening of the emotion, a solemn conclusion. Matthew's parallel text is entirely positive:

“He who receives you receives Me, and he who receives Me receives Him who sent Me. He who receives a prophet in the name of a prophet shall receive a prophet’s reward."

Luke's treatment retains the positive side of the seventy's potential reception, but places more emphasis on the negative.

=== Verse 17 ===
Then the seventy returned with joy, saying, "Lord, even the demons are subject to us in Your name".

Meyer notes that, given the nature of their mission in this chapter, it is unlikely that the seventy would all have returned to their starting point at the same time.

=== Verse 20 ===
Nevertheless, do not rejoice in this, that the spirits are subject to you, but rejoice that your names are written in heaven.

While the missionaries rejoice that they have power over the demons, Jesus tells them they should "raise their sights", their experience is "a reflection of, and a pointer to, something even more sublime in heaven". This verse has been contrasted with Jeremiah 17:13: "those who turn away from [the Lord] shall be written in the earth". Alexander Maclaren writes that "a name written on earth implies that the bearer of the name belongs to earth, and it also secondarily suggests that the inscription lasts but for a little while. Contrariwise, a name written in heaven implies that its bearer belongs to heaven, and that the inscription will abide".

== The Great Commandment and the Parable of the Good Samaritan (verses 25–37) ==
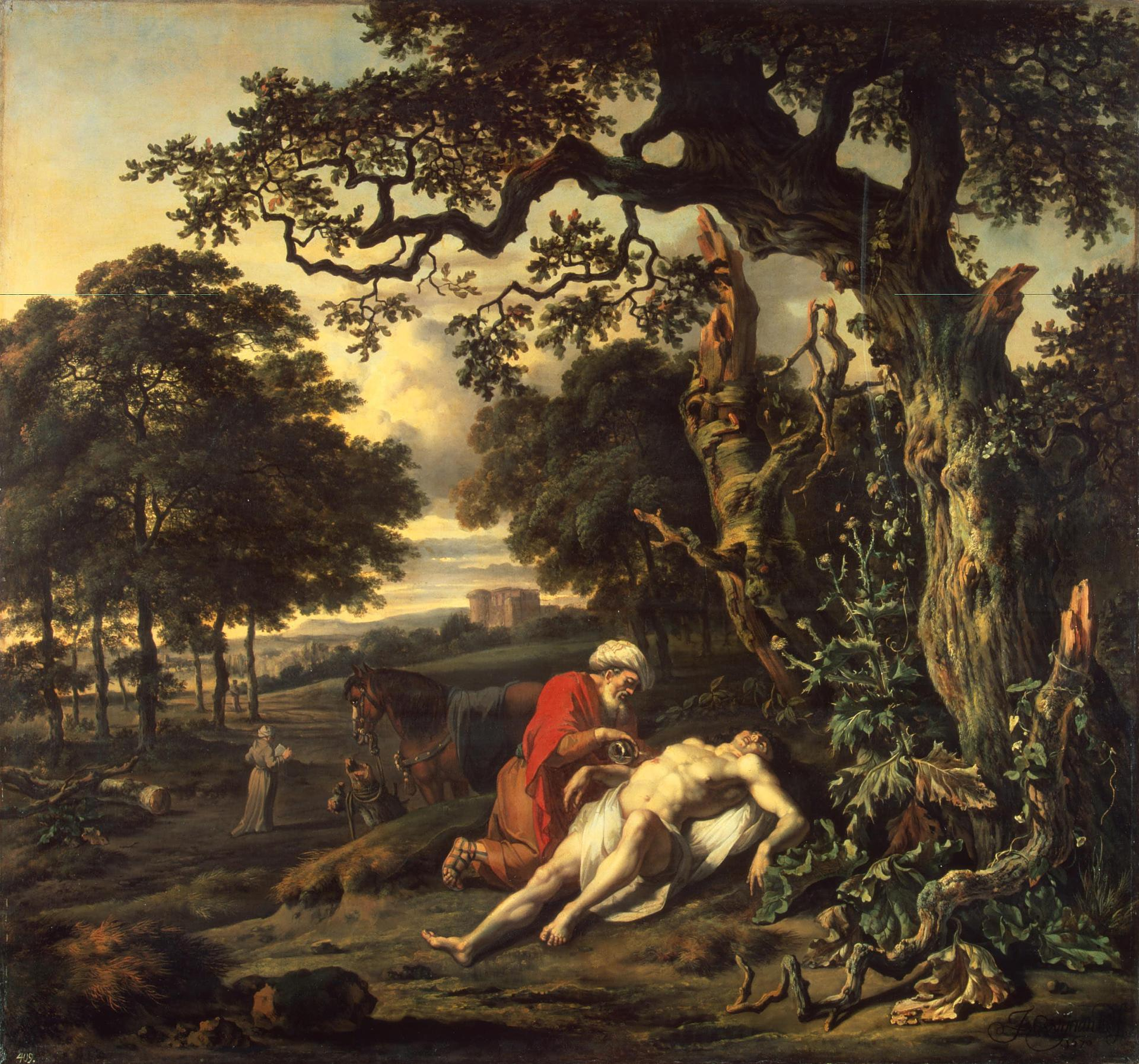
The Parable of the Good Samaritan by Jan Wijnants (1670) shows the Good Samaritan tending the injured man.

A lawyer or 'expert in the law' asked Jesus what he should do to inherit eternal life. Jesus asked him what was written in the law, and the lawyer referred to the teaching in Deuteronomy 6:4–5,

You shall love the Lord your God with all your heart, with all your soul, with all your strength, and with all your mind,

and to the ordinance of Leviticus 19:18,

You shall not take vengeance, nor bear any grudge against the children of your people, but you shall love your neighbor as yourself.

Jesus confirmed that the lawyer's answer was correct. Luke's treatment of this Great Commandment differs from those of Mark and Matthew, where Jesus directly instructed his disciples that these are the greatest commandments in the Law.

The lawyer then asked who his 'neighbour' is. In response, Jesus told a story of a traveller, presumably a Jew, who is beaten, robbed, and left half dead along the road. First a priest and then a Levite come by, but both avoid the man. Finally, a journeying Samaritan comes by. Samaritans and Jews generally despised each other, but the Samaritan helps the injured man. This parable is recounted only in this chapter of the New Testament.

Portraying a Samaritan in a positive light would have come as a shock to Jesus's audience. Some Christians, such as Augustine and John Newton, have interpreted the parable allegorically, with the Samaritan representing Jesus Christ, who saves the sinful soul. Others, however, discount this allegory as unrelated to the parable's original meaning, and see the parable as exemplifying the ethics of Jesus.

The parable has inspired painting, sculpture, poetry and film. The colloquial phrase "good Samaritan", meaning someone who helps a stranger, derives from this parable, and many hospitals and charitable organizations are named after the Good Samaritan.

== Mary and Martha (verses 38–42) ==
In Luke's account, the home of Martha and Mary is located in "a certain village". Martha welcomes Jesus into "her home". The narrative distinguishes between Martha's busy preparations and Mary's listening to Jesus, said to be the "better part".

Bethany is not mentioned and would not fit with the topography of Jesus' journey to Jerusalem, which at this point in the narrative is just commencing as he leaves Galilee. John J. Kilgallen suggests that "Luke has displaced the story of Martha and Mary".

== See also ==
- Ministry of Jesus
- Miracles of Jesus
- Related Bible parts: Isaiah 14; Matthew 8, 11, 13, 22;

Preceded by Luke 9	Chapters of the Bible; Gospel of Luke	Succeeded by Luke 11
