= List of New Testament minuscules (901–1000) =

A New Testament minuscule is a copy of a portion of the New Testament written in a small, cursive Greek script (developed from Uncial).

== Legend ==
- The numbers (#) are the now standard system of Caspar René Gregory, often referred to as the Gregory-Aland numbers.
- Included among the cataloged minuscules are the following types of manuscripts, color coded:

Grey represents continuous text manuscripts containing only New Testament portions
Beige represents manuscripts with New Testament portions and a catena (quotations from church fathers)
Light cyan represents manuscripts of single-author commentaries who included the full Scripture text.
Light red represents manuscripts of single-author commentaries who included both the full Scripture text and a catena.
Light purple represents manuscripts of commentaries where the Scripture text was abridged.
White represents manuscript numbers no longer in use.

- Dates are estimated to the nearest 100 year increment where specific date is unknown.
- Content generally only describes sections of the New Testament: Gospels, The Acts of the Apostles (Acts), Pauline epistles, and so on. Sometimes the surviving portion of a codex is so limited that specific books, chapters or even verses can be indicated. Linked articles, where they exist, generally specify content in detail, by verse.
- Digital images are referenced with direct links to the hosting web pages, with the exception of those at the INTF. The quality and accessibility of the images is as follows:

Gold color indicates high resolution color images available online.
Tan color indicates high resolution color images available locally, not online.
Light tan color indicates only a small fraction of manuscript pages with color images available online.
Light gray color indicates black/white or microfilm images available online.
Light blue color indicates manuscript not imaged, and is currently lost or ownership unknown.
Light pink color indicates manuscript destroyed, presumed destroyed, or deemed too fragile to digitize.
Violet color indicates high resolution ultraviolet images available online.

† Indicates the manuscript has damaged or missing pages.
^{P} Indicates only a portion of the books were included.
^{K} Indicates manuscript also includes a commentary.
^{S} Indicates lost portions of manuscript replaced via supplement of a later hand.
^{abs} (abschrift) Indicates manuscript is copy.
[ ] Brackets around Gregory-Aland number indicate the manuscript belongs to an already numbered manuscript, was found to not be a continuous text manuscript, was found to be written in modern Greek versus Koine Greek, was proved a forgery, or has been destroyed.

== Minuscules 901-1000 ==
#	Date	Contents	Pages	Institution and refs.	City, State	Country	Images
901	11th	Gospels, Acts, Pauline Epistles, General Epistles	328	Uppsala University, Gr. 12	Uppsala	Sweden	UU
901	11th	Gospels, Acts, Pauline Epistles, General Epistles	328	Uppsala University, Gr. 12	Uppsala	Sweden	INTF
902	12th	Gospels	230	Uppsala University, Gr. 13	Uppsala	Sweden	UU
902	12th	Gospels	230	Uppsala University, Gr. 13	Uppsala	Sweden	INTF
903 + [2168]	1381	Gospels	232	Greek Orthodox Patriarchate, 451 (119)	Alexandria	Egypt	INTF
903 + [2168]	1381	Gospels	1	National Library of Russia, Gr. 398, (John 1:1-15)	Saint Petersburg	Russia	INTF
904	1360	Gospels	376	Greek Orthodox Patriarchate, 77	Alexandria	Egypt	INTF
905	12th/13th	New Testament	499	Princeton University Library, Garrett MS. 5	Princeton, NJ	United States	INTF
905	12th/13th	New Testament	499	Ivan Dujcev Center for Slavo-Byzantine Studies, D. gr. 369	Sofia	Bulgaria	INTF
905	12th/13th	New Testament	499	Morgan Library & Museum, MS M. 714	New York, NY	United States	INTF
906	12th	Gospels	164	Princeton University Library, Garrett MS. 6	Princeton, NJ	United States	INTF
907	14th	Gospels	194	Skete of Saint Andrew, 27 (destroyed)	Mount Athos	Greece	
908	13th	Gospels	312	Skete of Saint Andrew, 4 (destroyed)	Mount Athos	Greece	
909	1108	Acts, Pauline Epistles, General Epistles	271	The Van Kampen Foundation, VK 902	(Unknown)	United States	CSNTM, INTF
910	1009	Acts, Pauline Epistles, General Epistles	265	British Library, Add MS 39598	London	United Kingdom	BL
910	1009	Acts, Pauline Epistles, General Epistles	265	British Library, Add MS 39598	London	United Kingdom	INTF
911 + [2040]	12th	Acts, Pauline Epistles, James - 2 Peter	318	British Library, Add MS 39599, 318 fol.	London	United Kingdom	BL
911 + [2040]	12th	Acts, Pauline Epistles, James - 2 Peter	318	British Library, Add MS 39599, 318 fol.	London	United Kingdom	INTF
911 + [2040]	12th	Revelation	16	British Library, Add MS 39601, 16 fol.	London	United Kingdom	BL
911 + [2040]	12th	Revelation	16	British Library, Add MS 39601, 16 fol.	London	United Kingdom	INTF
912	13th	Acts, Pauline Epistles, General Epistles	206	British Library, Add MS 39600	London	United Kingdom	BL
912	13th	Acts, Pauline Epistles, General Epistles	206	British Library, Add MS 39600	London	United Kingdom	INTF
913	14th	Acts, Pauline Epistles, General Epistles †	244	British Library, Egerton MS 2787	London	United Kingdom	BL
913	14th	Acts, Pauline Epistles, General Epistles †	244	British Library, Egerton MS 2787	London	United Kingdom	INTF
914	13th	Acts†, Pauline Epistles†, General Epistles†	344	Royal Site of San Lorenzo de El Escorial, R. III. 4	San Lorenzo de El Escorial	Spain	INTF
915	13th	Acts†, Pauline Epistles†, General Epistles†	237	Royal Site of San Lorenzo de El Escorial, T. III. 12	San Lorenzo de El Escorial	Spain	INTF
916	12th	Acts†	32	Royal Site of San Lorenzo de El Escorial, X. III. 3	San Lorenzo de El Escorial	Spain	INTF
917	12th	Acts, Pauline Epistles, General Epistles	137	Royal Site of San Lorenzo de El Escorial, III. 10	San Lorenzo de El Escorial	Spain	INTF
918	16th	Pauline Epistles†, General Epistles†	397	Royal Site of San Lorenzo de El Escorial, Σ. I. 5	San Lorenzo de El Escorial	Spain	INTF
919	11th	Acts†, Pauline Epistles†, General Epistles†, Revelation†	265	Royal Site of San Lorenzo de El Escorial, Ψ. III. 6	San Lorenzo de El Escorial	Spain	INTF
920	10th	Acts, Pauline Epistles, General Epistles, Revelation (no commentary)	239	Royal Site of San Lorenzo de El Escorial, Ψ. III. 18	San Lorenzo de El Escorial	Spain	INTF
921	1332	Acts, Pauline Epistles, General Epistles	334	Royal Site of San Lorenzo de El Escorial, X. IV. 9	San Lorenzo de El Escorial	Spain	INTF
922	1116	New Testament	405	Osiou Gregoriou Monastery, 3	Mount Athos	Greece	INTF
923	13th	Gospels	204	Osiou Gregoriou Monastery, 156	Mount Athos	Greece	MAR
924	13th	Gospels	356	Dionysiou Monastery, 45	Mount Athos	Greece	Elpenor
925 + [2156]	14th	Gospels	412	Dionysiou Monastery, 5	Mount Athos	Greece	INTF
925 + [2156]	14th	Gospels	1	National Library of Russia, Gr. 302 (Mt 10:27-36)	Saint Petersburg	Russia	INTF
926	13th	Gospels	161	Dionysiou Monastery, 52	Mount Athos	Greece	INTF
927 + [2618]	1133	Gospels, Acts, Pauline Epistles, General Epistles	280	Dionysiou Monastery, 54	Mount Athos	Greece	INTF, CSNTM
928 + [2165]	1304	Gospels, Acts, Pauline Epistles, General Epistles	331	Dionysiou Monastery, 56	Mount Athos	Greece	INTF, CSNTM
928 + [2165]	1304	Gospels, Acts, Pauline Epistles, General Epistles	2	National Library of Russia, Gr. 322 (Ph 3:13-4:23; Col 1:1-6)	Saint Petersburg	Russia	INTF
929	13th	Gospels	214	Dionysiou Monastery, 62	Mount Athos	Greece	INTF
930	12th	Gospels†	227	Dionysiou Monastery, 134	Mount Athos	Greece	INTF
931	13th	Gospels	217	Dionysiou Monastery, 133, fol. 3-219 (fol. 1.2, 200.221: ℓ1320)	Mount Athos	Greece	INTF
932	14th	Gospels	240	Dionysiou Monastery, 137	Mount Athos	Greece	INTF
933	12th	Gospels†	292	Dionysiou Monastery, 138	Mount Athos	Greece	INTF
934	14th	Gospels	260	Dionysiou Monastery, 139	Mount Athos	Greece	INTF
935	14th	New Testament	410	Dionysiou Monastery, 141	Mount Athos	Greece	INTF
936	12th	Matthew 7:13-28:20, Mark 1:14-10:10	69	Dionysiou Monastery, 157	Mount Athos	Greece	INTF
937	11th	Gospels	256	Dionysiou Monastery, 160	Mount Athos	Greece	INTF, CSNTM
938 + [2161]	1318	Gospels	271	Dionysiou Monastery, 159	Mount Athos	Greece	CSNTM
938 + [2161]	1318	Gospels	1	National Library of Russia, Gr. 315 (John 5:20-36)	Saint Petersburg	Russia	
939	12th	Gospels	238	Dionysiou Monastery, 161	Mount Athos	Greece	INTF
940	13th	Gospels†	176	Dionysiou Monastery, 162	Mount Athos	Greece	INTF
941	13th/14th	Gospels, Acts, Pauline Epistles, General Epistles	301	Dionysiou Monastery, 164	Mount Athos	Greece	INTF
942	10th	Gospels	383	Dionysiou Monastery, 121	Mount Athos	Greece	INTF, CSNTM
942	10th	Gospels	2	National Library of Russia, Gr. 286	Saint Petersburg	Russia	INTF
943	12th	Gospels	213	Dionysiou Monastery, 122	Mount Athos	Greece	INTF, CSNTM
944	12th	Gospels	331	Dionysiou Monastery, 123	Mount Athos	Greece	INTF, CSNTM
945	11th	Gospels, Acts, Pauline Epistles, General Epistles	347	Dionysiou Monastery, 124	Mount Athos	Greece	INTF, CSNTM
946	12th	Gospels	384	Dionysiou Monastery, 125	Mount Athos	Greece	INTF
946	12th	Gospels	384	Dionysiou Monastery, 125	Mount Athos	Greece	Elpenor
947	13th	Gospels†	298	Dionysiou Monastery, 129	Mount Athos	Greece	INTF
948	12th	Gospels	297	Dionysiou Monastery, 120	Mount Athos	Greece	INTF
949	13th	Theophylact Commentary on the Gospels	265	Dionysiou Monastery, 58	Mount Athos	Greece	INTF
950	12th	Mark 4:4-16:20; Luke 1:29-2:21	39	Dionysiou Monastery, 67	Mount Athos	Greece	INTF
951 + [2166]	1317	Gospels	374	Dionysiou Monastery, 88	Mount Athos	Greece	INTF, CSNTM
951 + [2166]	1317	Gospels	2	National Library of Russia, Gr. 326 (John 10:31-11:10)	Saint Petersburg	Russia	INTF
952	14th	Gospels	232	Dionysiou Monastery, 345	Mount Athos	Greece	INTF
953	14th	Gospels	262	Dionysiou Monastery, 346	Mount Athos	Greece	INTF
954	15th	Gospels	283	Dionysiou Monastery, 347	Mount Athos	Greece	INTF
955	15th	Gospels	364	Dionysiou Monastery, 247	Mount Athos	Greece	INTF
956	17th	Gospels, Acts, Pauline Epistles†	321	Dionysiou Monastery, 251	Mount Athos	Greece	INTF
957	16th	Gospels	297	Dionysiou Monastery, 256	Mount Athos	Greece	INTF
958	15th	Gospels	281	Dionysiou Monastery, 248	Mount Athos	Greece	INTF
959	1331	Gospels, Acts, Pauline Epistles, General Epistles	356	Dionysiou Monastery, 254	Mount Athos	Greece	INTF, CSNTM
960	14th	Gospels	362	Dionysiou Monastery, 249	Mount Athos	Greece	INTF
961	15th	Gospels	244	Dionysiou Monastery, 155, fol. 1-244 (fol. 245-319: ℓ1277)	Mount Athos	Greece	INTF
962	1498	Gospels†	190	Dionysiou Monastery, 257	Mount Athos	Greece	INTF, CSNTM
963	1636	Gospels	236	Dionysiou Monastery, 253	Mount Athos	Greece	INTF
964	11th	Gospels	164	Docheiariou Monastery, 7	Mount Athos	Greece	INTF
965	11th	Gospels	255	Docheiariou Monastery, 21	Mount Athos	Greece	INTF
966	13th	Gospels	325	Docheiariou Monastery, 22	Mount Athos	Greece	INTF
966	13th	Gospels	325	Docheiariou Monastery, 22	Mount Athos	Greece	Elpenor
967	12th	Luke† 7:6 — John† 11:16	106	Docheiariou Monastery, 30	Mount Athos	Greece	INTF
968	11th	Gospels	191	Docheiariou Monastery, 35	Mount Athos	Greece	INTF
969	13th	Gospels†	231	Docheiariou Monastery, 39	Mount Athos	Greece	INTF
970	13th	Theophylact Commentary on Matthew, Mark	206	Docheiariou Monastery, 42, fol. 1-206	Mount Athos	Greece	INTF
971	12th	Gospels	277	Docheiariou Monastery, 46	Mount Athos	Greece	INTF
972	11th	Gospels	317	Docheiariou Monastery, 49	Mount Athos	Greece	INTF
973	12th	Gospels	306	Docheiariou Monastery, 51	Mount Athos	Greece	INTF
974	12th	Gospels	238	Docheiariou Monastery, 52	Mount Athos	Greece	INTF
975	12th	Gospels	248	Docheiariou Monastery, 55	Mount Athos	Greece	INTF
976	12th	Gospels†	229	Docheiariou Monastery, 56	Mount Athos	Greece	INTF
977	14th	Luke†, John†	127	Docheiariou Monastery, 57	Mount Athos	Greece	INTF
978	14th	Gospels	428	Docheiariou Monastery, 76	Mount Athos	Greece	INTF
979	16th	Gospels	309	Docheiariou Monastery, 142	Mount Athos	Greece	MAR
980	12th	Gospels	273	Esphigmenou Monastery, 25	Mount Athos	Greece	INTF
981	13th	Gospels†	241	Esphigmenou Monastery, 26	Mount Athos	Greece	INTF
982	14th	Gospels	175	Esphigmenou Monastery, 27	Mount Athos	Greece	INTF
983	12th	Gospels†	208	Esphigmenou Monastery, 29	Mount Athos	Greece	INTF
984	14th	Gospels		Owner unknown, formerly: Esphigmenou Monastery, 30	Mount Athos	Greece	
985	12th	Gospels†	291	Esphigmenou Monastery, 31	Mount Athos	Greece	
986	14th	New Testament†	441	Esphigmenou Monastery, 186	Mount Athos	Greece	INTF
987	12th	Gospels†	176	Zograf Monastery, 4	Mount Athos	Greece	MAR
988	17th	Gospels	283	Zograf Monastery, 14	Mount Athos	Greece	MAR
989	12th	Gospels	264	Iviron Monastery, 2	Mount Athos	Greece	INTF, CSNTM
990	13th/14th	Gospels	460	Iviron Monastery, 5	Mount Athos	Greece	Elpenor
990	13th/14th	Gospels	460	Iviron Monastery, 5	Mount Athos	Greece	INTF
991	11th	Gospels†	214	Iviron Monastery, 7	Mount Athos	Greece	INTF, CSNTM
992	13th	Gospels	232	Iviron Monastery, 9	Mount Athos	Greece	INTF, CSNTM
993	12th	Theophylact Commentary on John†	98	Iviron Monastery, 18	Mount Athos	Greece	INTF, CSNTM
994	10th/11th	Matthew†, John†	246	Iviron Monastery, 19	Mount Athos	Greece	INTF, CSNTM
995	13th	Gospels	291	Iviron Monastery, 21	Mount Athos	Greece	INTF
996	14th	Gospels, Acts, Pauline Epistles, General Epistles	269	Iviron Monastery, 28	Mount Athos	Greece	INTF
997	13th	Gospels, Acts, Pauline Epistles, General Epistles	354	Iviron Monastery, 29	Mount Athos	Greece	INTF
998	12th	Gospels†	215	Iviron Monastery, 30	Mount Athos	Greece	INTF, CSNTM
999	13th	Gospels, Acts, Pauline Epistles, General Epistles	360	Iviron Monastery, 260	Mount Athos	Greece	INTF, CSNTM
1000	13th	Gospels†	280	Iviron Monastery, 32	Mount Athos	Greece	INTF

[top]

== See also ==
- List of New Testament papyri
- List of New Testament uncials
- List of New Testament minuscules (1–1000)
- List of New Testament minuscules (1001–2000)
- List of New Testament minuscules (2001–)
- List of New Testament minuscules ordered by Location/Institution
- List of New Testament lectionaries

== Bibliography ==
- Aland, Kurt; M. Welte; B. Köster; K. Junack (1994). Kurzgefasste Liste der griechischen Handschriften des Neues Testaments. Berlin, New York: Walter de Gruyter. p. 95. ISBN 3-11-011986-2.
- "Liste Handschriften". Münster: Institute for New Testament Textual Research.
