= Lectionary 182 =

Lectionary ℓ 182
- New Testament manuscript
- Text: Evangelistarion †
- Date: 9th century
- Script: Greek
- Now at: British Library
- Size: 26.5 by 19.3 cm

Lectionary 182, designated by siglum ℓ 182 (in the Gregory-Aland numbering) is a Greek manuscript of the New Testament, on parchment leaves. Palaeographically it has been assigned to the 9th century. Scrivener labelled it as Lectionary 233^{evl}. The manuscript is very lacunose, only three leaves of the codex have survived.

== Description ==
The codex contains 33 verses Lessons from the Gospels of Matthew 1:1-11.11-22; 7:7-8; Mark 9:41; 11:22-26; Luke 11:1-4 lectionary (Evangelistarium), on only 3 parchment leaves (26.5 cm by 19.3 cm). It is written in Greek uncial letters, in two columns per page, 19 lines per page. It has Menologion for 9-20 December.

== History ==
The manuscript was held in the Dochiariou monastery at Mount Athos. The manuscript was collated by Scrivener, slightly examined by Gregory in 1883.

The manuscript is not cited in the critical editions of the Greek New Testament (UBS3).

Currently the codex is located in the British Library, (Add MS 39583) in London.

== See also ==
- List of New Testament lectionaries
- Biblical manuscript
- Textual criticism

== Bibliography ==
- F. H. A. Scrivener, An Exact Transcript of the Codex Augiensis (Cambridge and London, 1859), p. 52. (as P^{2})
