= Minuscule 923 =

- New Testament manuscript
- Text: Gospels
- Date: 13th century
- Script: Greek
- Now at: Osiou Gregoriou monastery
- Size: 18.8 cm by 15 cm
- Type: Byzantine
- Category: none
- Note: marginalia

Minuscule 923 (in the Gregory-Aland numbering), ε 1476 (von Soden), is a 13th-century Greek minuscule manuscript of the New Testament on parchment. It has marginalia and was prepared for liturgical use. The manuscript has survived in complete condition.

== Description ==
The codex contains the text of the four Gospels, on 204 parchment leaves (size 18.8 cm by 15 cm). The text is written in one column per page, 25 lines per page.

The text of the Gospels is divided according to the κεφαλαια (chapters), whose numbers are given at the margin, and their τιτλοι (titles of chapters) at the top of the pages. There is also a division according to the smaller Ammonian Sections (in Mark 234 sections, the last section in Mark 16:9), whose numbers are given at the margin. There are no references to the Eusebian Canons.

It contains the Eusebian Canon tables at the beginning and tables of the κεφαλαια (tables of contents) before each of the Gospels. It has lectionary markings on the margin for liturgical use.

== Text ==
The Greek text of the codex is a representative of the Byzantine. Hermann von Soden classified it to the textual family K^{x}. Kurt Aland did not place it in any Category. According to the Claremont Profile Method it belongs to the textual family K^{x} in Luke 1 and Luke 20. In Luke 10 no profile was made. It creates textual cluster 281 with minuscule 281 and 906.

== History ==
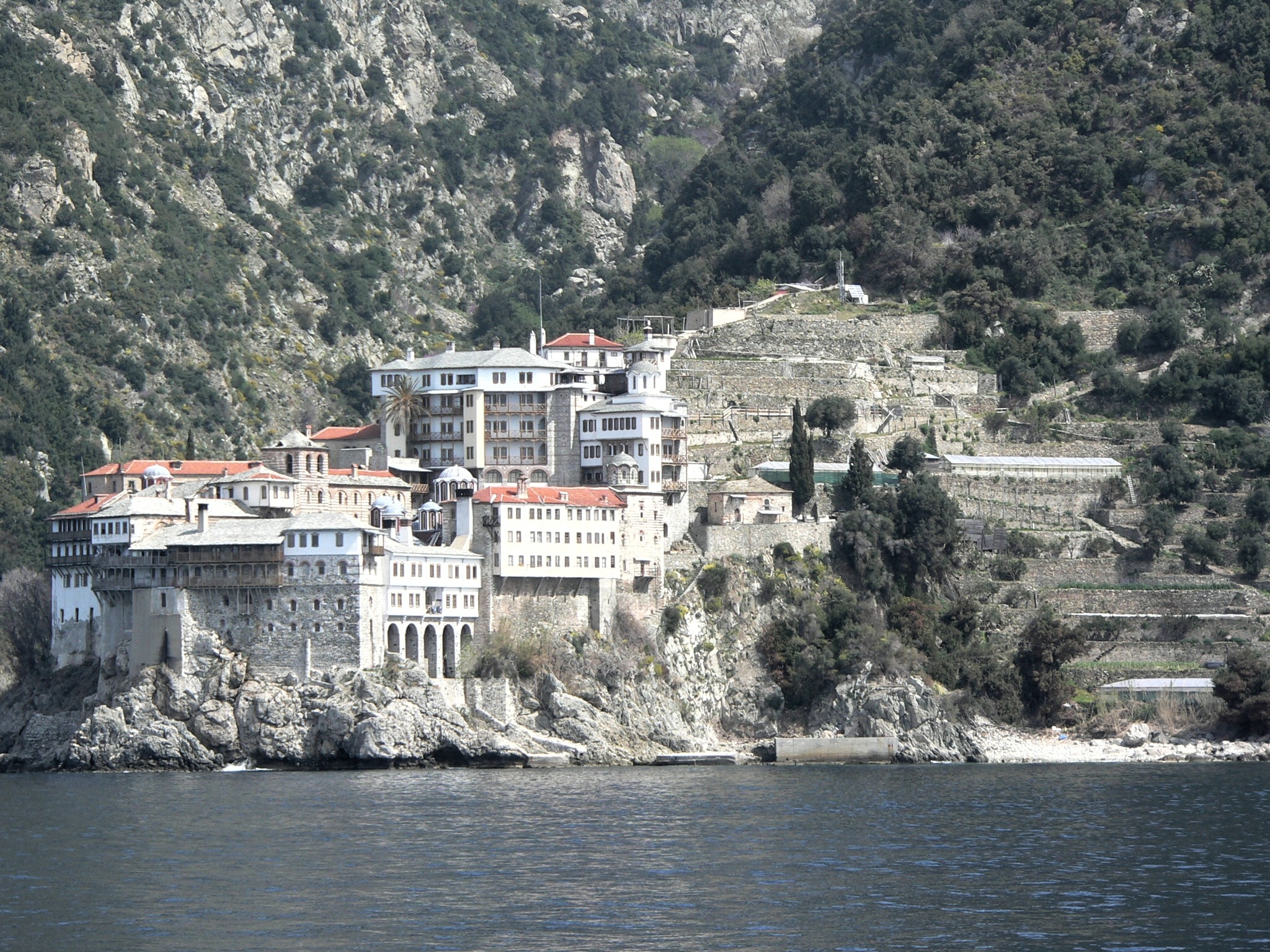
View on the monastery Gregoriu

According to C. R. Gregory it was written in the 12th century. Currently the manuscript is dated by the INTF to the 13th century. The history of the codex 923 is known until the year 1886, when it was seen by Gregory at the Osiou Gregoriou monastery, in Mount Athos. The manuscript is still housed at the Osiou Gregoriou monastery (156 (2)).

The manuscript was added to the list of New Testament manuscripts by Gregory (923^{e}). It was not on the Scrivener's list, but it was added to his list by Edward Miller in the 4th edition of A Plain Introduction to the Criticism of the New Testament.

It is not cited in critical editions of the Greek New Testament (UBS4, NA28).

== See also ==
- List of New Testament minuscules (1–1000)
- Biblical manuscript
- Textual criticism
