= Minuscule 924 =

- New Testament manuscript
- Text: Gospels
- Date: 13th century
- Script: Greek
- Now at: Dionysiou monastery
- Size: 26 cm by 18.5 cm
- Type: Byzantine
- Category: V
- Note: marginalia

Minuscule 924 (in the Gregory-Aland numbering), ε 1355 (von Soden), is a 13th-century Greek minuscule manuscript of the New Testament on parchment. It has marginalia. The manuscript has survived in complete condition.

== Description ==
The codex contains the text of the four Gospels, on 356 parchment leaves (size 26 cm by 18.5 cm). The text is written in one column per page, 21 lines per page. It is an ornamented manuscript.

The text of the Gospels is divided according to the Ammonian Sections, whose numbers are given at the margin. There are references to the Eusebian Canons (written below Ammonian Section numbers).

It contains Epistula ad Carpianum, the Eusebian Canon tables at the beginning, tables of the κεφαλαια (tables of contents) before each of the Gospels, subscriptions at the end of each Gospel and portrait of Evangelists before each Gospel (John evangelist with Prochorus).

== Text ==
The Greek text of the codex is a representative of the Byzantine. Hermann von Soden classified it to the textual family I^{η}. Kurt Aland placed it in Category V. According to the Claremont Profile Method it belongs to the textual group 22b in Luke 1, Luke 10 and Luke 20.

== History ==
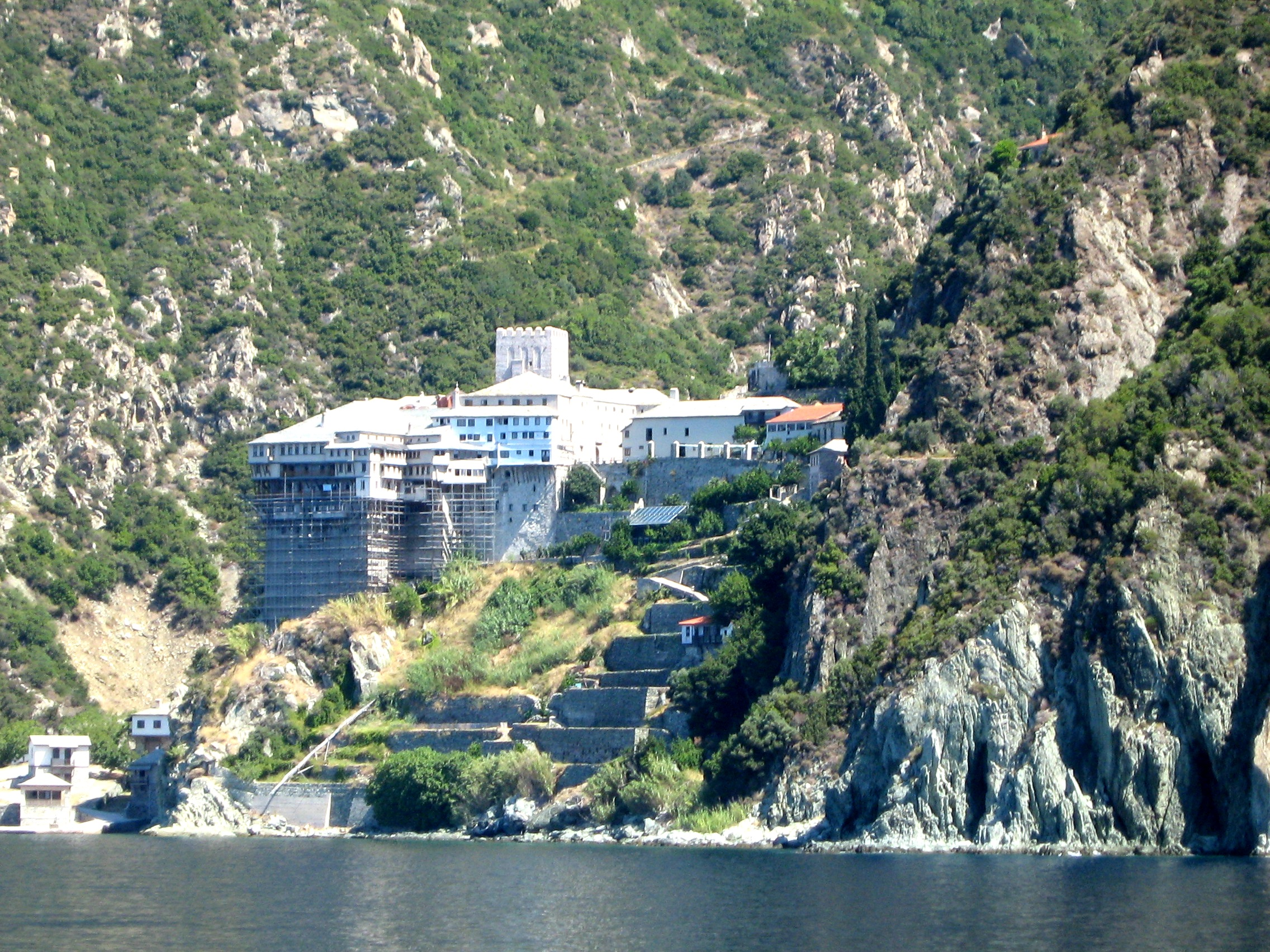
View on the monastery Dionysiou

According to C. R. Gregory it was written in the 12th century. Currently the manuscript is dated by the INTF to the 13th century. The history of the codex 924 is known until the year 1886, when it was seen by Gregory at the Dionysiou monastery, in Mount Athos. The manuscript is still housed at the Dionysiou monastery (38 (4)).

The manuscript was added to the list of New Testament manuscripts by Gregory (924^{e}). It was not on the Scrivener's list, but it was added to his list by Edward Miller in the 4th edition of A Plain Introduction to the Criticism of the New Testament.

It is not cited in critical editions of the Greek New Testament (UBS4, NA28).

== See also ==
- List of New Testament minuscules (1–1000)
- Minuscule 925
- Biblical manuscript
- Textual criticism
