= Minuscule 939 =

- New Testament manuscript
- Text: Gospels
- Date: 12th-century
- Script: Greek
- Now at: Dionysiou monastery
- Size: 15.8 cm by 11.0 cm
- Type: Byzantine
- Category: none

Minuscule 939 (in the Gregory-Aland numbering), ε 1361 von Soden), is a 12th-century Greek minuscule manuscript of the New Testament on parchment. It contains some liturgical matter. The manuscript has survived in complete condition.

== Description ==
The codex contains the text of the four Gospels, on 238 parchment leaves (size 15.8 cm by 11.0 cm). The text is written in one column per page, 20 lines per page. The leaves are arranged in sedez.

It contains Epistula ad Carpianum at the beginning of the manuscript, but there is no Eusebian Canon tables. It contains lectionary markings at the margin of the text for liturgical use. It contains liturgical books with hagiographies: Synaxarion and Menologion, at the end of the manuscript.

== Text ==
The Greek text of the codex is a representative of the Byzantine. Hermann von Soden classified it to the textual family K^{x}. Kurt Aland did not place it in any Category. According to the Claremont Profile Method it represents textual Family K^{x} in Luke 10 and a mixture of the byzantine families in Luke 1 and Luke 20. It creates a textual pair with minuscule 1693.

== History ==
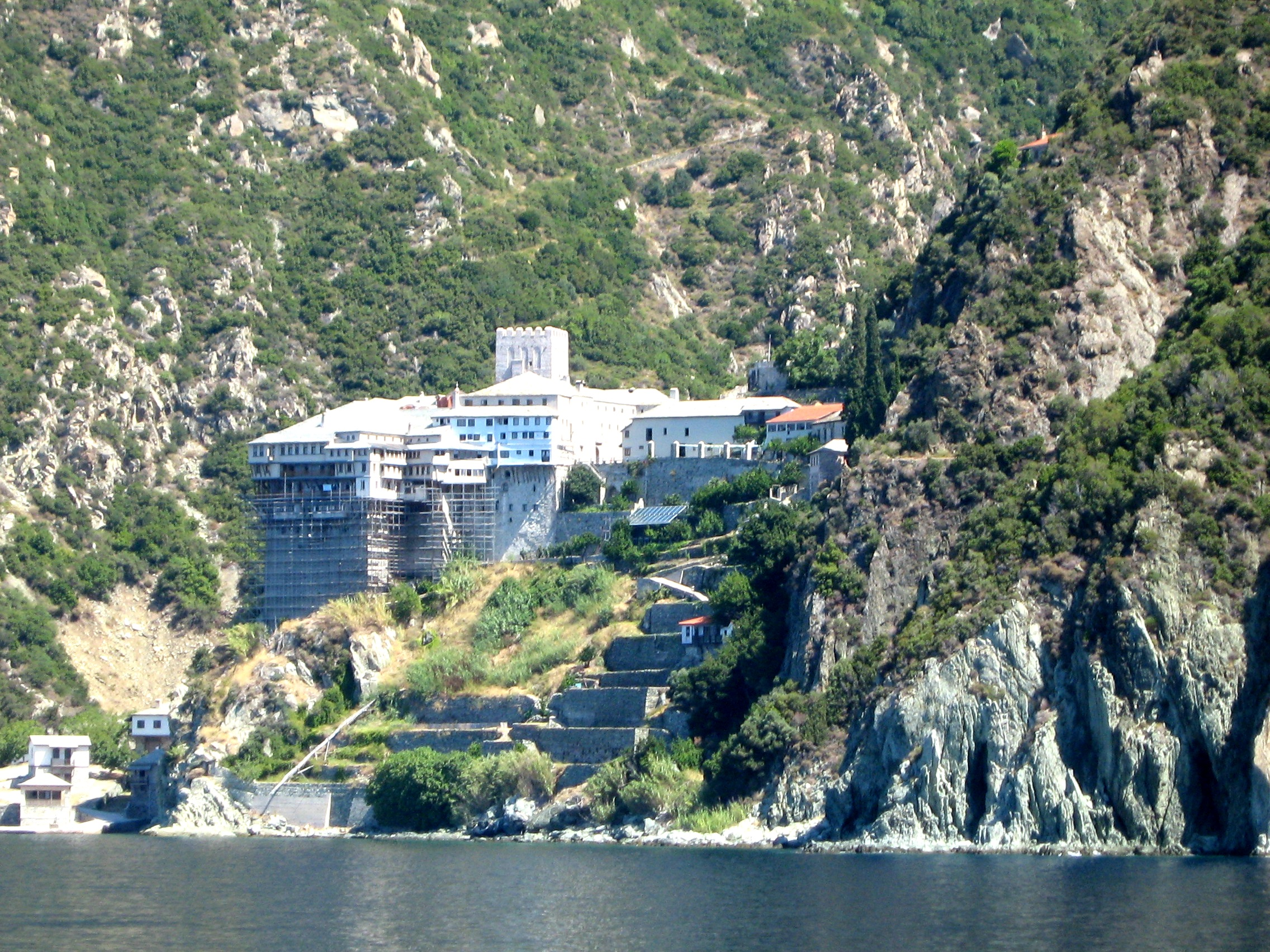
View on the monastery Dionysiou

The manuscript was dated by Gregory to the 13th century. Currently it is dated by the INTF to the 12th century.

The codex 939 was seen by Gregory at the Dionysiou monastery (31), in Mount Athos. Currently the manuscript is housed at the Dionysiou monastery (163 (31)) in Athos.

The manuscript was added to the list of New Testament manuscripts by C. R. Gregory (939^{e}). It was not on the Scrivener's list, but it was added to this list by Edward Miller in the 4th edition of A Plain Introduction to the Criticism of the New Testament.

It is not cited in critical editions of the Greek New Testament (UBS4, NA28).

== See also ==
- List of New Testament minuscules (1–1000)
- Biblical manuscript
- Textual criticism
