= Minuscule 926 =

New Testament manuscript

- New Testament manuscript
- Text: Gospels
- Date: 13th century
- Script: Greek
- Now at: Dionysiou monastery
- Size: 22.5 cm by 18 cm
- Type: Byzantine
- Category: none
- Note: marginalia

Minuscule 926 (in the Gregory-Aland numbering), ε 1359 (von Soden), is a 13th-century Greek minuscule manuscript of the New Testament on parchment. It has marginalia. The manuscript has survived in complete condition.

== Description ==
The codex contains the text of the four Gospels, on 161 parchment leaves (size 22.5 cm by 18 cm). The text is written in one column per page, 27 lines per page. The leaves of the codex are arranged in octavo. According to Hermann von Soden it is an ornamented manuscript.

== Text ==
The Greek text of the codex is a representative of the Byzantine. Hermann von Soden classified it to the textual family K^{x}. Kurt Aland did not place it in any Category. According to the Claremont Profile Method it belongs to the textual cluster 490 in Luke 1, Luke 10 and Luke 20.

== History ==
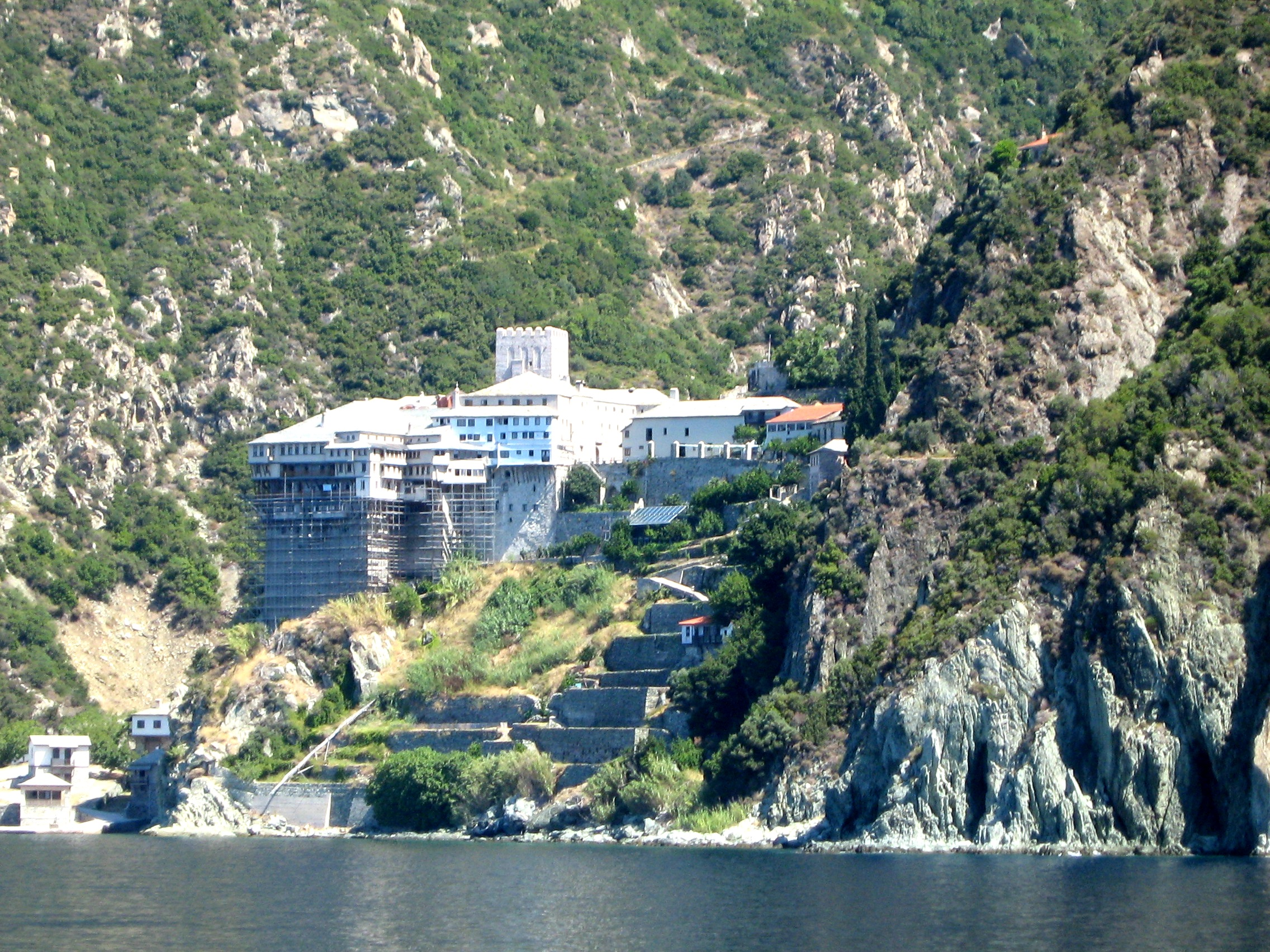
View on the monastery Dionysiou

According to C. R. Gregory it was written in the 12th century. Currently the manuscript is dated by the INTF to the 13th century. It was written by scribe named Nicephorus. The codex 926 was seen by Gregory at the Dionysiou monastery, in Mount Athos. The manuscript is still housed at the Dionysiou monastery (41 (7)).

The manuscript was added to the list of New Testament manuscripts by Gregory (926^{e}). It was not on the Scrivener's list, but it was added to his list by Edward Miller in the 4th edition of A Plain Introduction to the Criticism of the New Testament.

It is not cited in critical editions of the Greek New Testament (UBS4, NA28).

== See also ==
- List of New Testament minuscules (1–1000)
- Biblical manuscript
- Textual criticism
