= Minuscule 936 =

- New Testament manuscript
- Text: Gospels †
- Date: 12th century
- Script: Greek
- Now at: Dionysiou monastery
- Size: 16.7 cm by 11.0 cm
- Type: Byzantine
- Category: V

Minuscule 936 (in the Gregory-Aland numbering), ε 2098 (von Soden), is a 12th-century Greek minuscule manuscript of the New Testament on parchment. It has marginalia and was prepared for liturgical use. The manuscript has not survived in complete condition, it is lacunosae.

== Description ==
The codex contains the text of the Gospel of Matthew (7:13-28:20) and Gospel of Mark (1:14-10:10), on 69 parchment leaves (size 16.7 cm by 11.0 cm). The text is written in one column per page, 24 lines per page. The leaves are arranged in sedez.

== Text ==
The Greek text of the codex is a representative of the Byzantine. It was not examined by Hermann von Soden. Kurt Aland placed it in Category V. It was not examined by the Claremont Profile Method.

== History ==
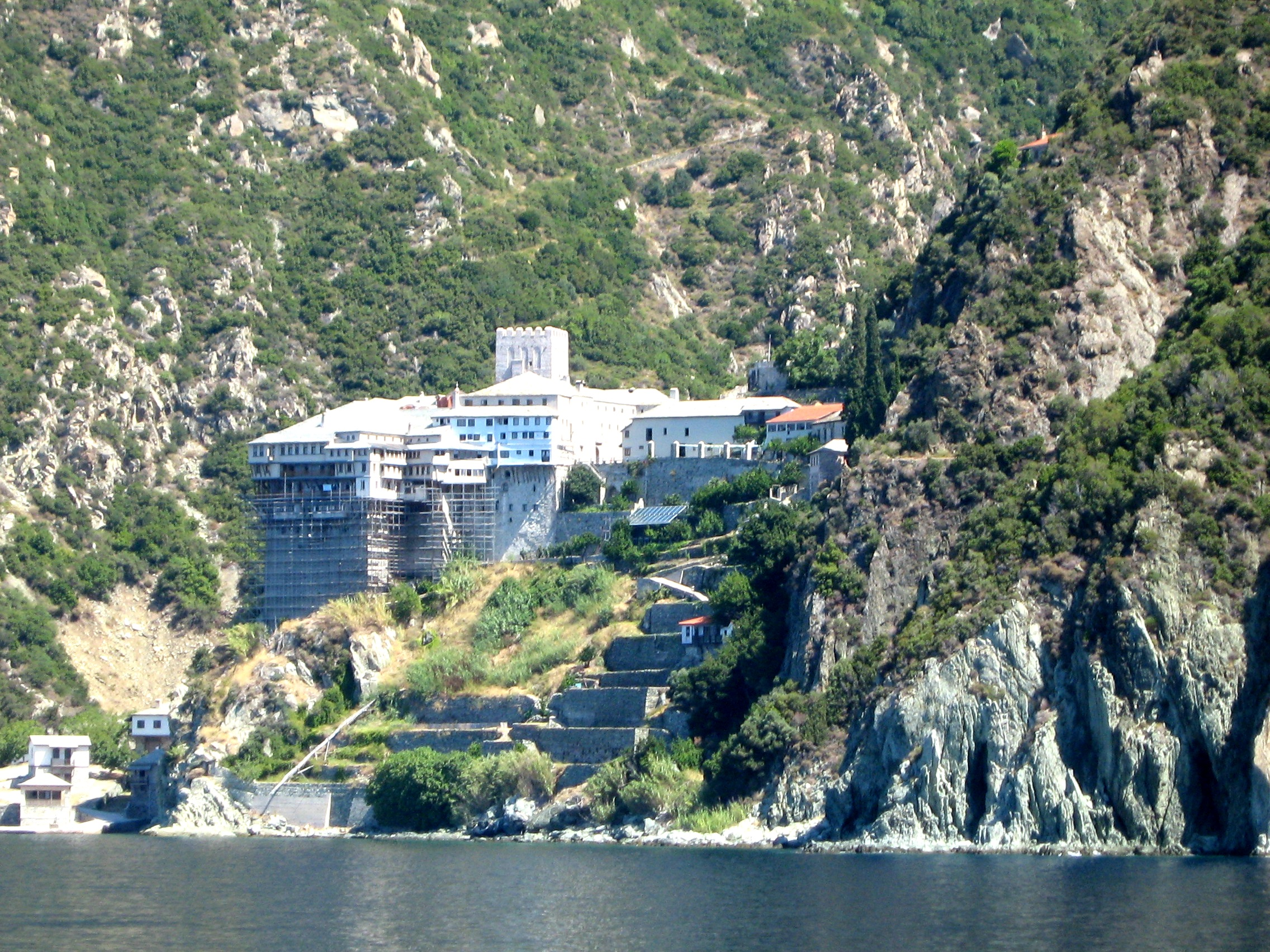
View on the monastery Dionysiou

The manuscript was dated by Gregory to the 12th century. Currently it is dated by the INTF to the 12th century. The codex 936 was seen by Gregory at the Dionysiou monastery (28), in Mount Athos. Currently the manuscript is housed at the Dionysiou monastery (160 (28)) in Athos.

The manuscript was added to the list of New Testament manuscripts by C. R. Gregory (936^{e}). It was not on the Scrivener's list, but it was added to this list by Edward Miller in the 4th edition of A Plain Introduction to the Criticism of the New Testament.

It is not cited in critical editions of the Greek New Testament (UBS4, NA28).

== See also ==
- List of New Testament minuscules (1–1000)
- Biblical manuscript
- Textual criticism
