= Minuscule 942 =

- New Testament manuscript
- Text: Gospels
- Date: 10th-century
- Script: Greek
- Now at: Dionysiou monastery Russian National Library
- Size: 14.3 cm by 11.8 cm
- Type: Byzantine
- Category: V

Minuscule 942 (in the Gregory-Aland numbering), ε 1365 von Soden), is a 10th-century Greek minuscule manuscript of the New Testament on parchment. The manuscript has survived in complete condition.

== Description ==
The codex contains the text of the four Gospels on 385 parchment leaves (size 14.3 cm by 11.8 cm). The text is written in one column per page, 18 lines per page. The leaves are arranged in sedez.

It contains the Eusebian Canon tables, and pictures. There is no Epistula ad Carpianum. The manuscript is ornamented.

== Text ==
The Greek text of the codex is a representative of the Byzantine. Hermann von Soden classified it as text K. Kurt Aland placed it in Category V. According to the Claremont Profile Method it represents textual Family K^{x} in Luke 1, Luke 10, and Luke 14.

== History ==
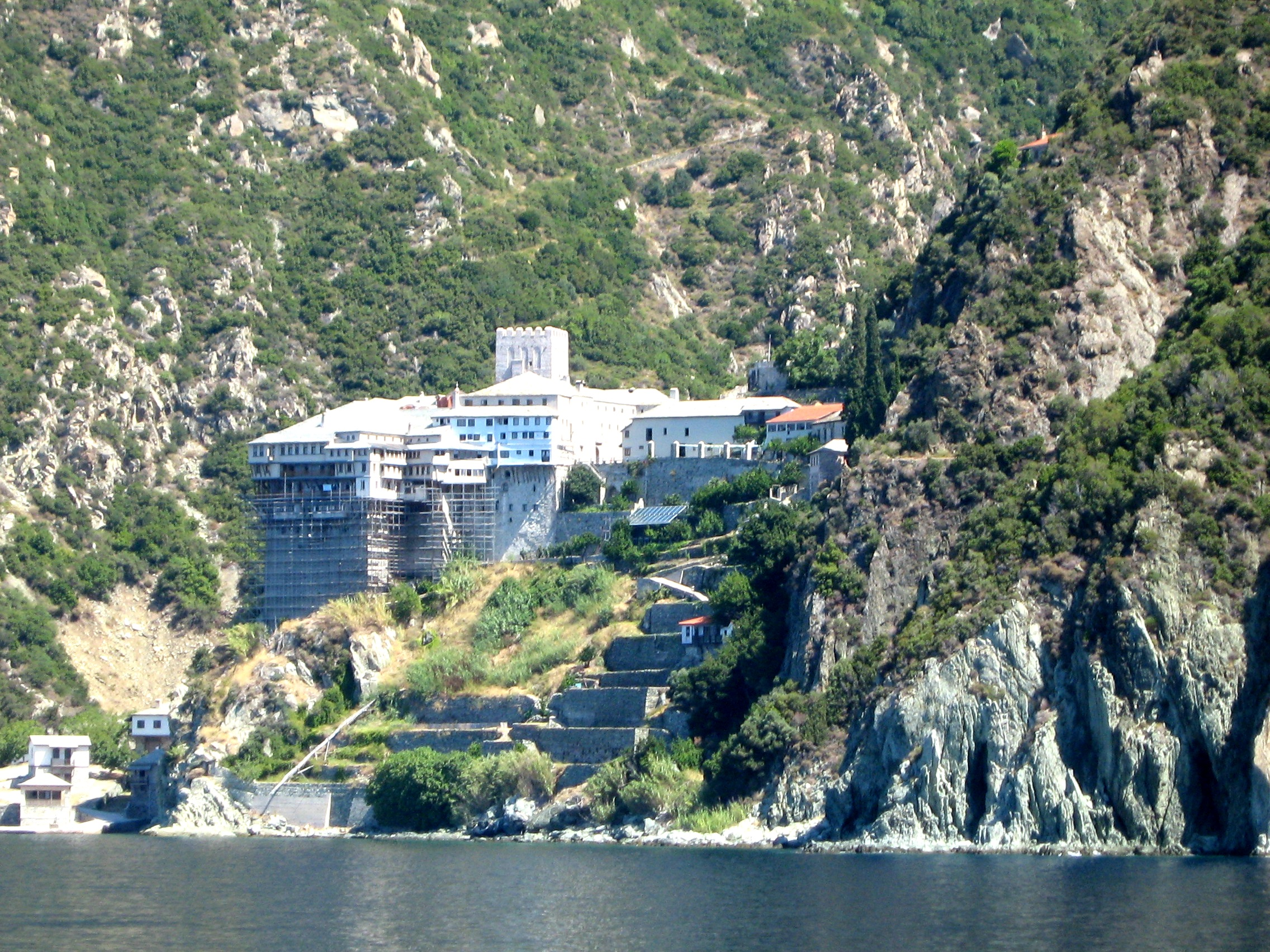
View on the monastery Dionysiou

The manuscript was dated by Gregory to the 13th century. Currently it is dated by the INTF to the 10th century.

The codex 942 was seen by Gregory at the Dionysiou monastery (34), in Mount Athos. Currently 383 folios of the manuscript are housed at the Dionysiou monastery (121 (34)) in Athos. 2 folios are housed at the Russian National Library (Gr. 286) in St. Petersburg, they do not contain biblical text.

The manuscript was added to the list of New Testament manuscripts by C. R. Gregory (942^{e}). It was not on the Scrivener's list, but it was added to this list by Edward Miller in the 4th edition of A Plain Introduction to the Criticism of the New Testament.

It was examined by Kurt Treu.

It is not cited in critical editions of the Greek New Testament (UBS4, NA28).

== See also ==
- List of New Testament minuscules (1–1000)
- Biblical manuscript
- Textual criticism
