= Minuscule 937 =

- New Testament manuscript
- Text: Gospels †
- Date: 11th century
- Script: Greek
- Now at: Dionysiou monastery
- Size: 15.8 cm by 13.5 cm
- Type: Byzantine
- Category: V

Minuscule 937 (in the Gregory-Aland numbering), ε 1137von Soden), is an 11th-century Greek minuscule manuscript of the New Testament on parchment. It has marginalia and was prepared for liturgical use. The manuscript has not survived in complete condition.

== Description ==
The codex contains the text of the four Gospels, on 256 parchment leaves (size 15.8 cm by 13.5 cm). The text is written in one column per page, 22 lines per page. The leaves are arranged in sedez. The manuscript is lacunose at the end (John 21:11-25). In John 14:22-15:5 it was supplied by later hand.

It contains Epistula ad Carpianum, but it lacks the Eusebian Canon Tables. It uses lectionary markings at the margin for liturgical use.

== Text ==
The Greek text of the codex is a representative of the Byzantine. Hermann von Soden classified it to the textual family K^{x}. Kurt Aland placed it in Category V. According to the Claremont Profile Method it represents textual Family K^{x} in Luke 1, Luke 10 and Luke 20. The manuscript is a fragmentary in Luke 20.

== History ==
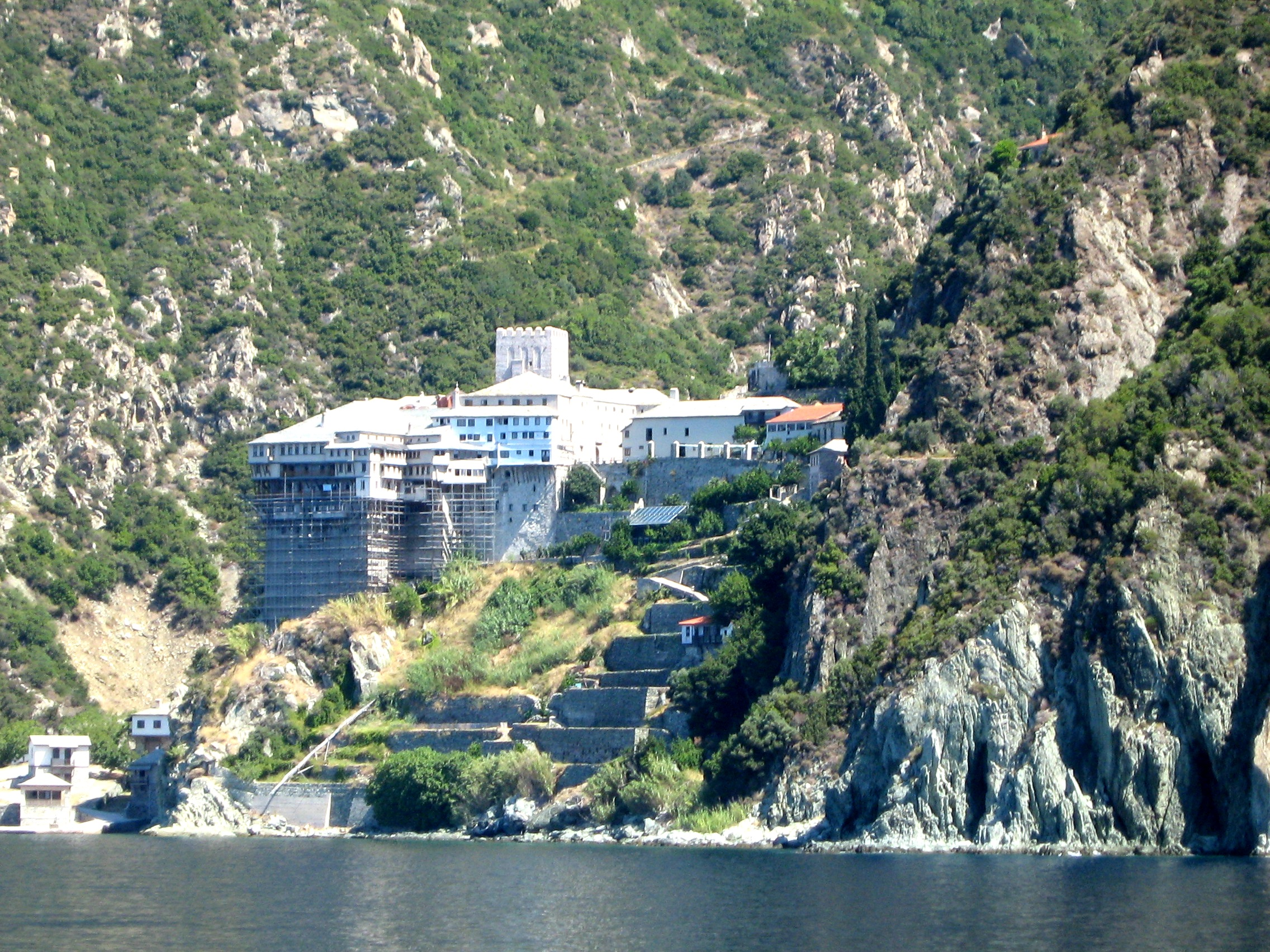
View on the monastery Dionysiou

The manuscript was dated by Gregory to the 11th century. Currently it is dated by the INTF to the 11th century. The codex 937 was seen by Gregory at the Dionysiou monastery (29), in Mount Athos. Currently the manuscript is housed at the Dionysiou monastery (161 (29)) in Athos.

The manuscript was added to the list of New Testament manuscripts by C. R. Gregory (937^{e}). It was not on the Scrivener's list, but it was added to this list by Edward Miller in the 4th edition of A Plain Introduction to the Criticism of the New Testament.

It is not cited in critical editions of the Greek New Testament (UBS4, NA28).

== See also ==
- List of New Testament minuscules (1–1000)
- Biblical manuscript
- Textual criticism
