= Minuscule 931 =

- New Testament manuscript
- Text: Gospels
- Date: 12th century
- Script: Greek
- Now at: Dionysiou monastery
- Size: 19.3 cm by 15.0 cm
- Type: Byzantine
- Category: none
- Note: marginalia

Minuscule 931 (in the Gregory-Aland numbering), ε 1361 (von Soden), is a 13th-century Greek minuscule manuscript of the New Testament on parchment. It has marginalia and was prepared for liturgical use. The manuscript has not survived in complete condition.

== Description ==
The codex contains the text of the four Gospels, on 217 parchment leaves (size 19.3 cm by 15.0 cm). The text is written in one column per page, 24 lines per page. The leaves are arranged in octavo. It contains the Eusebian Canon tables and pictures (portraits of Evangelists). It lacks Matthew 24:27-33.

== Text ==
The Greek text of the codex is a representative of the Byzantine. Hermann von Soden classified it to the textual family I^{κ}. Kurt Aland did not place it in any Category. According to the Claremont Profile Method it belongs to the textual family Π^{b} in Luke 1 and Luke 20. In Luke 10 no profile was made.

== History ==
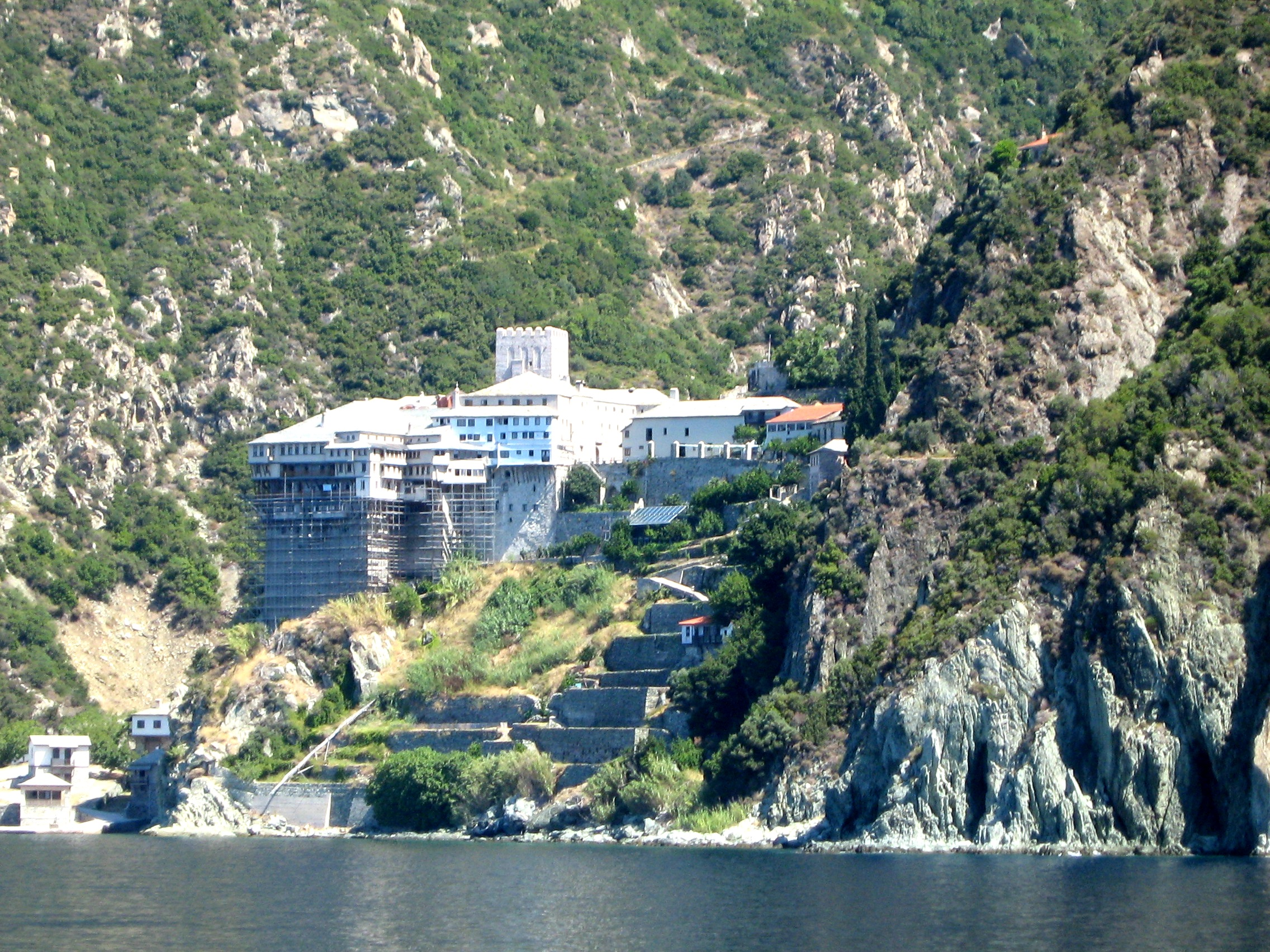
View on the monastery Dionysiou

The manuscript was dated by Gregory to the 13th century. Currently it is dated by the INTF to the 13th century. The codex 931 was seen by Gregory at the Dionysiou monastery (23), in Mount Athos. Currently the manuscript is housed at the Dionysiou monastery (133 (23)) in Athos. Two leaves were classified as ℓ 1320. Originally they belonged to the same manuscript.

The manuscript was added to the list of New Testament manuscripts by C. R. Gregory (931^{e}). It was not on Scrivener's list, but it was added to his list by Edward Miller in the 4th edition of A Plain Introduction to the Criticism of the New Testament.

It is not cited in critical editions of the Greek New Testament (UBS4, NA28).

== See also ==
- List of New Testament minuscules (1–1000)
- Biblical manuscript
- Textual criticism
