= Minuscule 943 =

- New Testament manuscript
- Text: Gospels
- Date: 12th-century
- Script: Greek
- Now at: Dionysiou monastery
- Size: 14.4 cm by 11.0 cm
- Type: Byzantine
- Category: V

Minuscule 943 (in the Gregory-Aland numbering), ε 1366 von Soden), is a 12th-century Greek minuscule manuscript of the New Testament on parchment. The manuscript has survived in complete condition.

== Description ==
The codex contains the text of the four Gospels on 213 parchment leaves (size 14.4 cm by 11.0 cm). The text is written in one column per page, 25 lines per page. The leaves are arranged in sedez.

It contains the Epistula ad Carpianum, Eusebian Canon tables, and pictures (portraits of Evangelists). It contains lectionary markings at the margin (for liturgical use). The manuscript is ornamented.

== Text ==
The Greek text of the codex is a representative of the Byzantine. Hermann von Soden classified it to the textual family K^{x}. Kurt Aland placed it in Category V. According to the Claremont Profile Method it represents textual Family K^{x} in Luke 10 and Luke 20. In Luke 1 it represents a mixture of Byzantine families.

== History ==
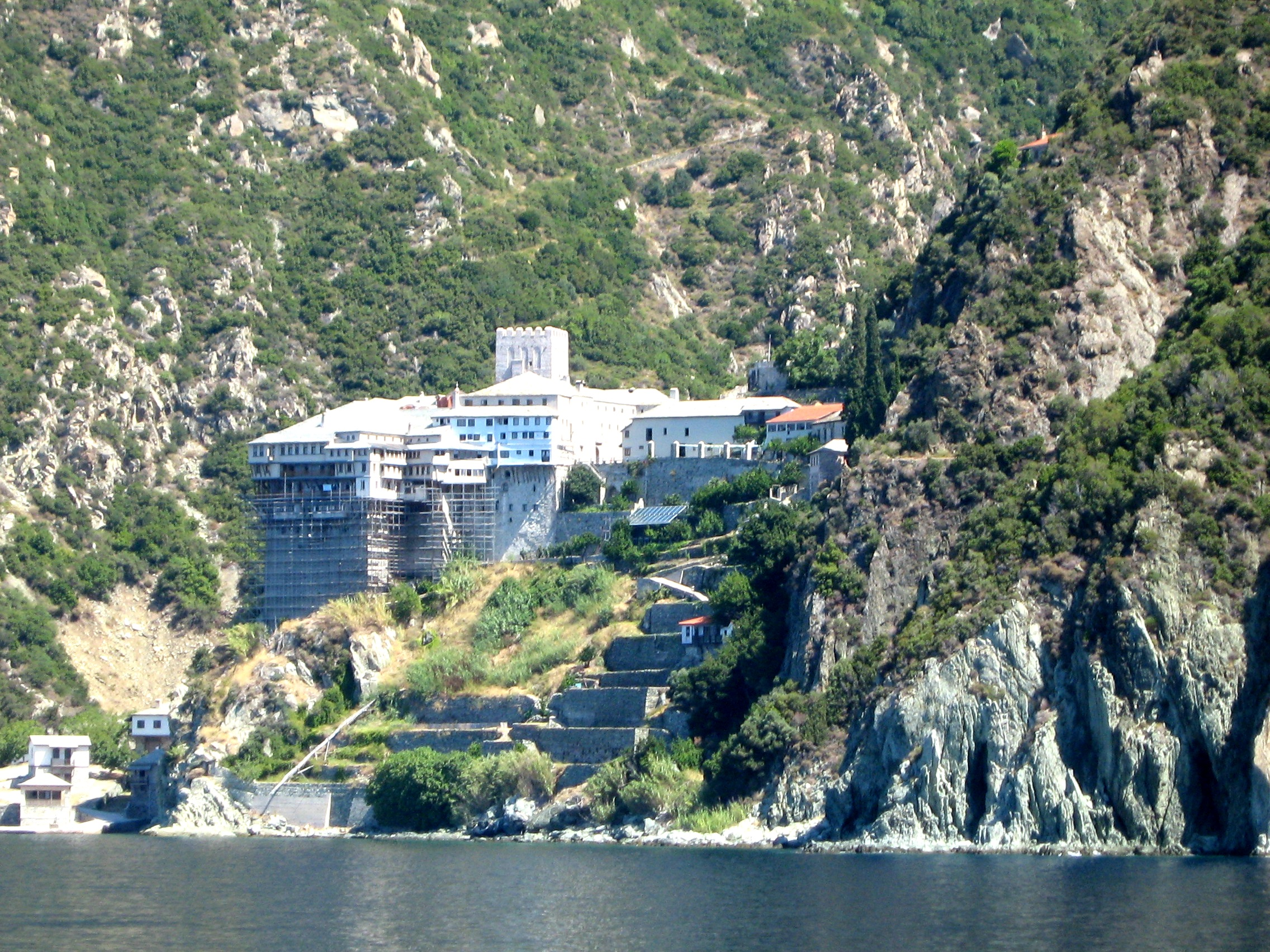
View on the monastery Dionysiou

The manuscript was dated by Gregory to the 13th century. Currently it is dated by the INTF to the 12th century.

The codex 943 was seen by Gregory at the Dionysiou monastery (35), in Mount Athos in 1886. Currently the manuscript is housed at the Dionysiou monastery (122 (35)) in Athos.

The manuscript was added to the list of New Testament manuscripts by C. R. Gregory (943^{e}). It was not on the Scrivener's list, but it was added to this list by Edward Miller in the 4th edition of A Plain Introduction to the Criticism of the New Testament.

It is not cited in critical editions of the Greek New Testament (UBS4, NA28).

== See also ==
- List of New Testament minuscules (1–1000)
- Biblical manuscript
- Textual criticism
