= Minuscule 940 =

- New Testament manuscript
- Text: Gospels †
- Date: 13th-century
- Script: Greek
- Now at: Dionysiou monastery
- Size: 16.0 cm by 11.8 cm
- Type: Byzantine
- Category: none

Minuscule 940 (in the Gregory-Aland numbering), ε 1364 von Soden), is a 13th-century Greek minuscule manuscript of the New Testament on parchment. The manuscript has not survived in complete condition.

== Description ==
The codex contains the text of the four Gospels, on 176 parchment leaves (size 16.0 cm by 11.8 cm). It has lacuna at the end of the Gospel of John. The text is written in one column per page, 29 lines per page. The leaves are arranged in sedez.

It contains pictures and liturgical books with hagiographies: Synaxarion and Menologion, at the end of the manuscript.

== Text ==
The Greek text of the codex is a representative of the Byzantine. Hermann von Soden classified it to the textual family K^{r}. Kurt Aland did not place it in any Category. According to the Claremont Profile Method it represents textual Family K^{r} in Luke 1 and Luke 20 as a perfect member. In Luke 10 no profile was made.

== History ==
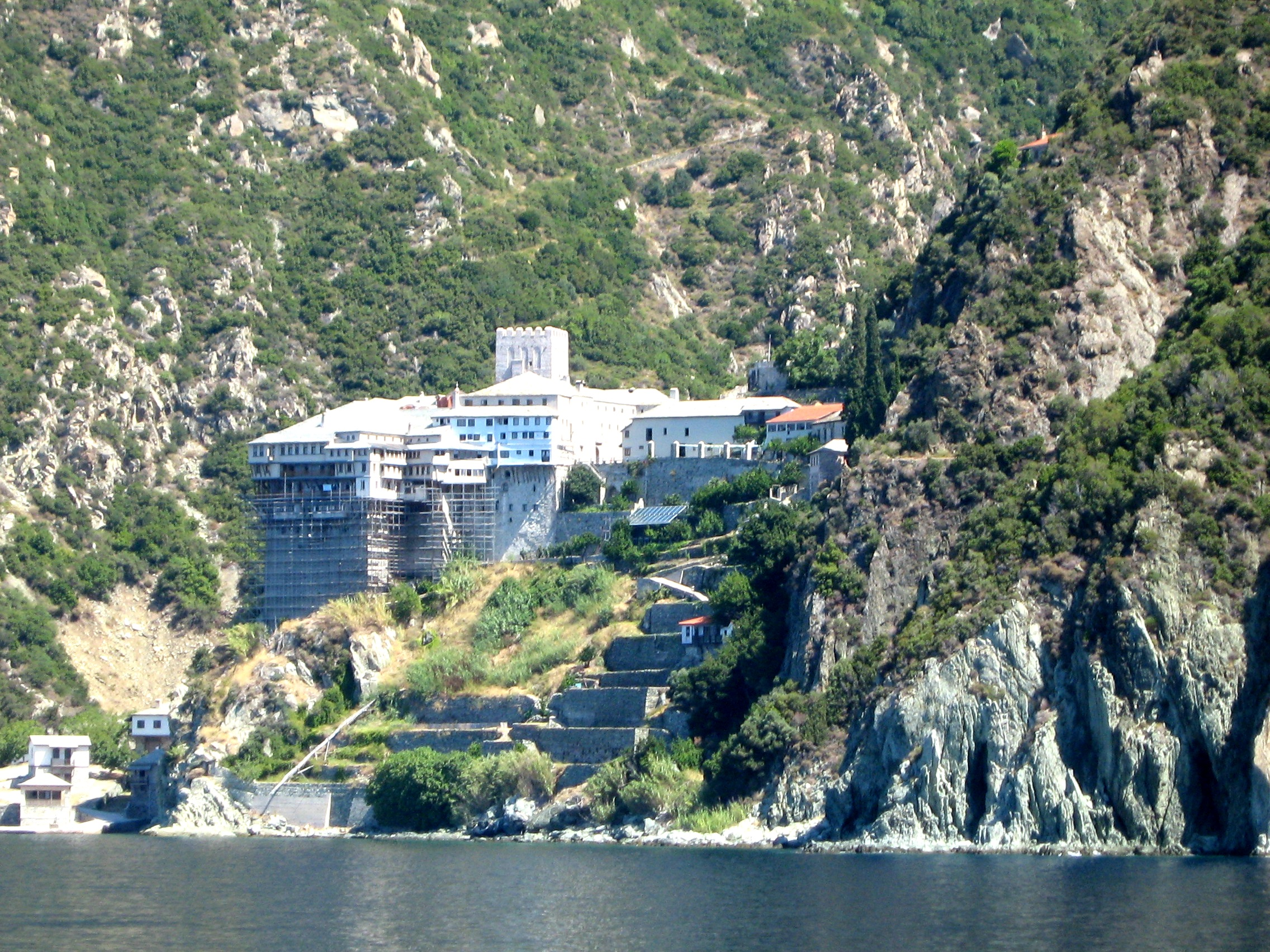
View on the monastery Dionysiou

The manuscript was dated by Gregory to the 13th century. Currently it is dated by the INTF to the 13th century.

The codex 940 was seen by Gregory at the Dionysiou monastery (32), in Mount Athos. Currently the manuscript is housed at the Dionysiou monastery (162 (32)) in Athos.

The manuscript was added to the list of New Testament manuscripts by C. R. Gregory (940^{e}). It was not on the Scrivener's list, but it was added to this list by Edward Miller in the 4th edition of A Plain Introduction to the Criticism of the New Testament.

It is not cited in critical editions of the Greek New Testament (UBS4, NA28).

== See also ==
- List of New Testament minuscules (1–1000)
- Biblical manuscript
- Textual criticism
