= Minuscule 938 =

- New Testament manuscript
- Text: Gospels
- Date: 1318
- Script: Greek
- Now at: Dionysiou monastery
- Size: 16.4 cm by 11.4 cm
- Type: Byzantine
- Category: V

Minuscule 938 (in the Gregory-Aland numbering), ε 1451 von Soden), is a 14th-century Greek minuscule manuscript of the New Testament on parchment. The manuscript has survived in complete condition. It contains some liturgical matter.

== Description ==
The codex contains the text of the four Gospels, on 272 parchment leaves (size 16.4 cm by 11.4 cm). The text is written in one column per page, 21 lines per page. The leaves are arranged in sedez.

It contains liturgical books with hagiographies: Synaxarion and Menologion.

One leaf catalogued as Minuscule 2161 belonged to the same manuscript as 938.

== Text ==
The Greek text of the codex is a representative of the Byzantine. Hermann von Soden classified it to the textual family K^{r}. Kurt Aland placed it in Category V. According to the Claremont Profile Method it represents textual Family K^{r} in Luke 1, Luke 10 and Luke 20 as a perfect member.

== History ==
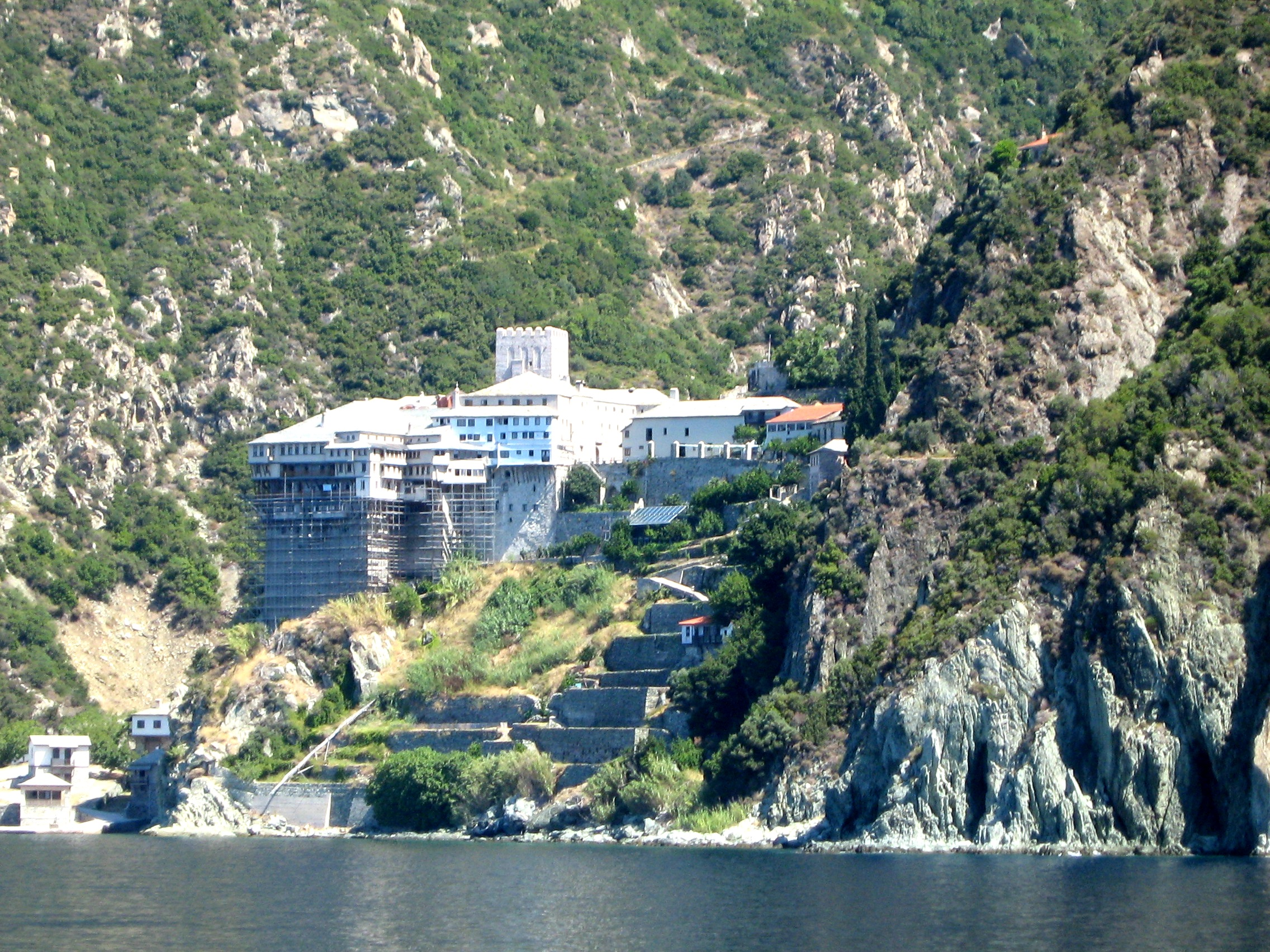
View on the monastery Dionysiou

The manuscript is dated by a colophon to the year 1318. The name of the scribe was Chariton.

The codex 938 was seen by Gregory at the Dionysiou monastery (30), in Mount Athos. 271 folios of the manuscript are housed at the Dionysiou monastery (159 (30)) in Athos. One leaf is housed at the Russian National Library (Gr. 315) in St. Petersburg

The manuscript was added to the list of New Testament manuscripts by C. R. Gregory (938^{e}). It was not on the Scrivener's list, but it was added to this list by Edward Miller in the 4th edition of A Plain Introduction to the Criticism of the New Testament.

The manuscript was examined and described by Kurt Treu.

It is not cited in critical editions of the Greek New Testament (UBS4, NA28).

== See also ==
- List of New Testament minuscules (1–1000)
- Biblical manuscript
- Textual criticism
