= Minuscule 934 =

- New Testament manuscript
- Text: Gospels
- Date: 14th century
- Script: Greek
- Now at: Dionysiou monastery
- Size: 18.5 cm by 14.0 cm
- Type: Byzantine
- Category: none
- Note: marginalia

Minuscule 934 (in the Gregory-Aland numbering), ε 2005 (von Soden), is a 14th-century Greek minuscule manuscript of the New Testament on parchment. It has marginalia and was prepared for liturgical use. The manuscript has not survived in complete condition.

== Description ==
The codex contains the text of the four Gospels, on 260 parchment leaves (size 18.5 cm by 14.0 cm). The text is written in one column per page, 25 lines per page. The leaves are arranged in octavo. It contains lectionary markings at the margin for liturgical use. It lacks the text of John 21:8-22.

== Text ==
The Greek text of the codex is a representative of the Byzantine. Hermann von Soden classified it to the textual family K^{x}. Kurt Aland did not place it in any Category. According to the Claremont Profile Method it belongs to the textual family K^{x} in Luke 1, Luke 10 and Luke 20. It creates textual cluster 934 with 1353 and 2660.

== History ==
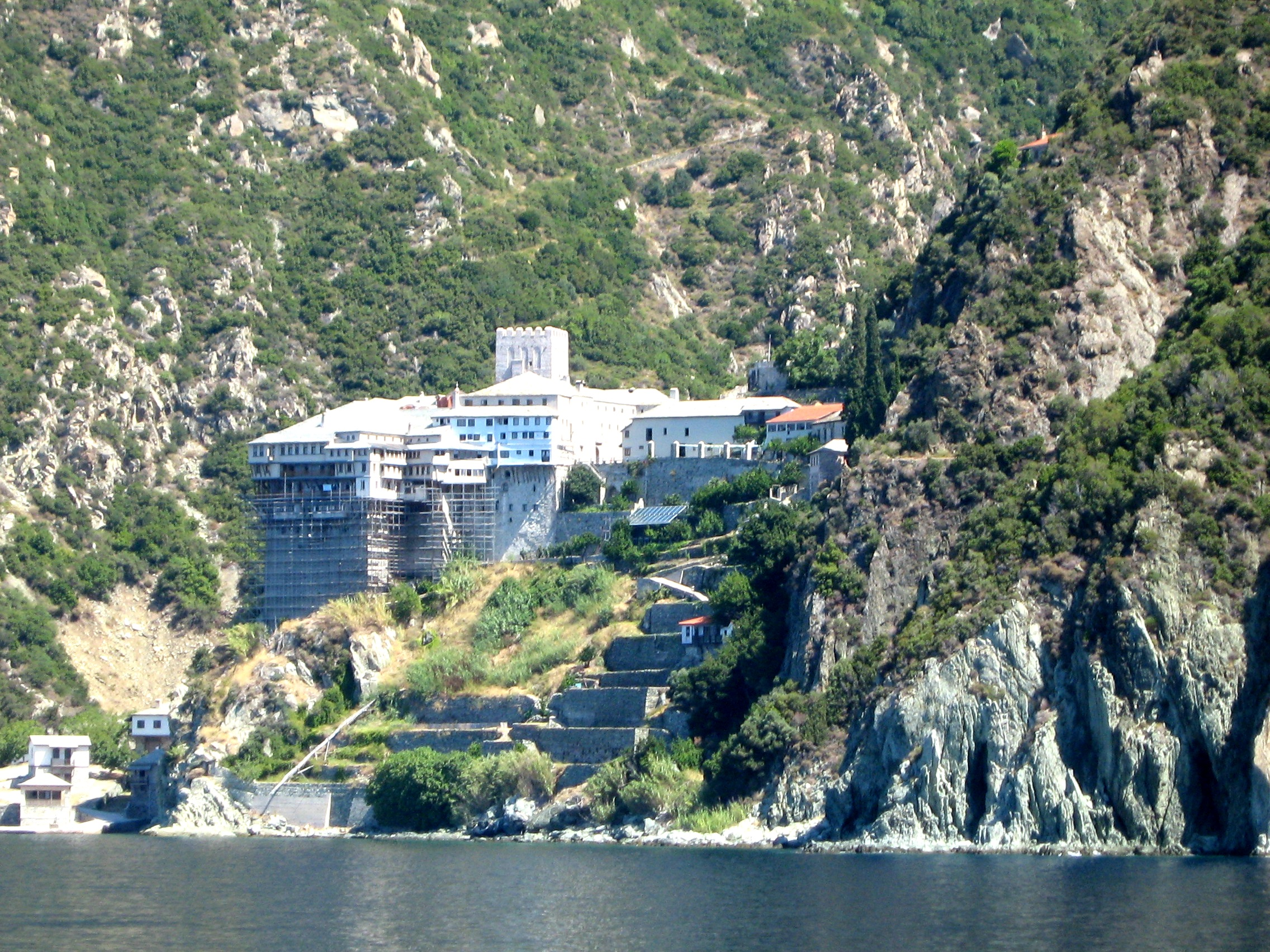
View on the monastery Dionysiou

The manuscript was dated by Gregory to the 12th century. Currently it is dated by the INTF to the 14th century. The codex 934 was seen by Gregory at the Dionysiou monastery (26), in Mount Athos. Currently the manuscript is housed at the Dionysiou monastery (139 (26)) in Athos.

The manuscript was added to the list of New Testament manuscripts by C. R. Gregory (934^{e}). It was not on the Scrivener's list, but it was added to this list by Edward Miller in the 4th edition of A Plain Introduction to the Criticism of the New Testament.

It is not cited in critical editions of the Greek New Testament (UBS4, NA28).

== See also ==
- List of New Testament minuscules (1–1000)
- Biblical manuscript
- Textual criticism
