= Minuscule 925 =

- New Testament manuscript
- Text: Gospels
- Date: 14th century
- Script: Greek
- Now at: Dionysiou monastery National Library of Russia
- Size: 25 cm by 18.2 cm
- Type: Byzantine
- Category: none
- Note: marginalia

Minuscule 925 (in the Gregory-Aland numbering), ε 1450 (von Soden), is a 14th-century Greek minuscule manuscript of the New Testament on parchment. It has marginalia. The manuscript has survived in complete condition.

== Description ==
The codex contains the text of the four Gospels, on 413 parchment leaves (size 25 cm by 18.2 cm). The text is written in one column per page, 21-22 lines per page. The leaves of the codex are arranged in octavo. The manuscript is ornamented.

== Text ==
The Greek text of the codex is a representative of the Byzantine. Hermann von Soden classified it to the textual family K^{x}. Kurt Aland did not place it in any Category. According to the Claremont Profile Method it belongs to the textual family K^{x} in Luke 1 and Luke 20. In Luke 10 no profile was made.

== History ==
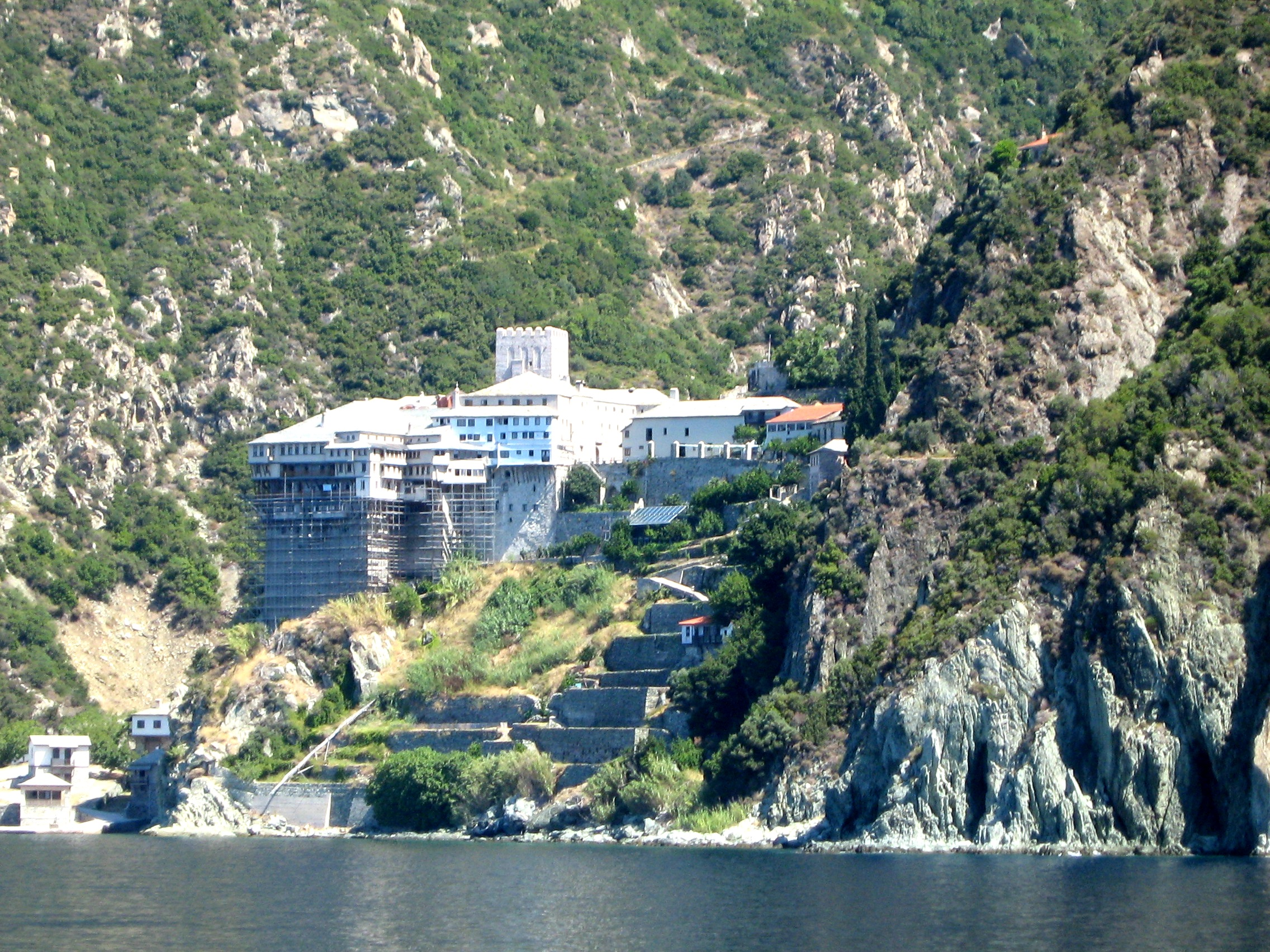
View on the monastery Dionysiou

According to C. R. Gregory it was written in the 14th century. Currently the manuscript is dated by the INTF to the 14th century. It was written by scribe named Nicephorus. The codex 925 was seen by Gregory at the Dionysiou monastery, in Mount Athos. 412 leaves of the manuscript are housed at the Dionysiou monastery (46 (5)), one leaf with text of Matthew 10:27-36 is housed at the National Library of Russia (Gr. 302) in Saint Petersburg. This leaf was previously cataloged as minuscule 2156.

The manuscript was added to the list of New Testament manuscripts by Gregory (925^{e}). It was not on the Scrivener's list, but it was added to his list by Edward Miller in the 4th edition of A Plain Introduction to the Criticism of the New Testament.

It is not cited in critical editions of the Greek New Testament (UBS4, NA28).

== See also ==
- List of New Testament minuscules (1–1000)
- Biblical manuscript
- Textual criticism
