= Minuscule 906 =

- New Testament manuscript
- Text: Gospels
- Date: 12th century
- Script: Greek
- Now at: Princeton University Library
- Size: 18.3 cm by 14.2 cm
- Type: Byzantine text-type
- Category: V
- Note: marginalia

Minuscule 906 (in the Gregory-Aland numbering), ε1258 (von Soden), is a 12th-century Greek minuscule manuscript of the New Testament on parchment. The manuscript has survived in complete condition. It has marginalia, 12th century canon tables and illuminated headpieces, and five significant inserted 12th century miniatures.

== Description ==
The codex contains the text of the four Gospels on 164 parchment leaves (size 18.3 cm by 14.2 cm). The text is written in one column per page, 29 lines per page. According to Hermann von Soden it is an ornamented manuscript.

The text is divided according to chapters (κεφαλαια), whose numbers are given at the margin, and their titles (τιτλοι) at the top of the pages. There is also another division according to the smaller Ammonian Sections (in Mark 234 Sections, the last in 19:9), without references to the Eusebian Canons.

It also contains Epistula ad Carpianum, Eusebian Canon tables, tables of the κεφαλαια, lectionary markings at the margin (for liturgical use), subscriptions at the end of each of the Gospels, and pictures.

== Text ==
The Greek text of the codex is a representative of the Byzantine text-type. Hermann von Soden included it to the textual family K^{x}. Kurt Aland placed it in Category V.

According to the Claremont Profile Method it represents the textual family K^{x} in Luke 1 and Luke 20. No profile was made for Luke 10. It forms a textual cluster with codex 281.

== History ==
C. R. Gregory dated the manuscript to the 12th century. Currently the manuscript is dated by the INTF to the 12th century. Formerly it was held at the Athos monastery (St. Andrew E'). C. R. Gregory saw it in 1886.

The manuscript was added to the list of New Testament manuscripts by Gregory (906^{e}). It was not on the Scrivener's list, but it was added to his list by Edward Miller in the 4th edition of A Plain Introduction to the Criticism of the New Testament.

The manuscript was described by Kenneth W. Clark.

Currently it is housed in the Princeton University Library (Garrett 6), in the United States.

== See also ==
- List of New Testament minuscules
- Minuscule 905
- Biblical manuscript
- Textual criticism
