= Minuscule 913 =

- New Testament manuscript
- Text: New Testament (except the Gospels and Apocalypse)
- Date: 14th century
- Script: Greek
- Now at: British Library
- Size: 19.5 cm by 14.5 cm
- Type: ?
- Category: none

Minuscule 913 (in the Gregory-Aland numbering), α 470 (von Soden), is a 14th-century Greek minuscule manuscript of the New Testament on parchment.

== Description ==
The codex contains the text of the Book of Acts, Pauline epistles, and Catholic epistles, on 244 parchment leaves (size 19.5 cm by 14.5 cm) with some lacunae. It lacks texts of the Acts 2:36-3:24 and Jude 20-25.

The text is written in one column per page, and 22 lines per page.

The text is divided according to chapters (κεφαλαια), whose numbers are given at the margin, and their titles (τιτλοι) at the top of the pages.

It contains tables of κεφαλαια (tables of contents) before each book, liturgical books with hagiographies (Synaxarion and Menologion), subscriptions at the end of each book with numbers of στιχοι.

== Text ==
Kurt Aland the Greek text of the codex did not place in any Category. Its textual character is unknown.

== History ==
According to Scrivener and C. R. Gregory the manuscript was written in the 14th century. Currently the manuscript is dated by the INTF to the 14th century.

It was bought by Dean Burgon. In 1893 it was obtained for the British Museum. C. R. Gregory saw it in 1883.

The manuscript was added to the list of New Testament manuscripts by Scrivener (223^{a}, 262^{p}) and Gregory (229^{a}, 248^{p}). In 1908 Gregory gave the number 913 to it.

It is currently housed in the British Library (Egerton MS 2787) in London.

== See also ==
- List of New Testament minuscules
- Minuscule 912
- Biblical manuscript
- Textual criticism
