= Docheiariou =

Eastern Orthodox monastery, Mount Athos

- Δοχειαρίου
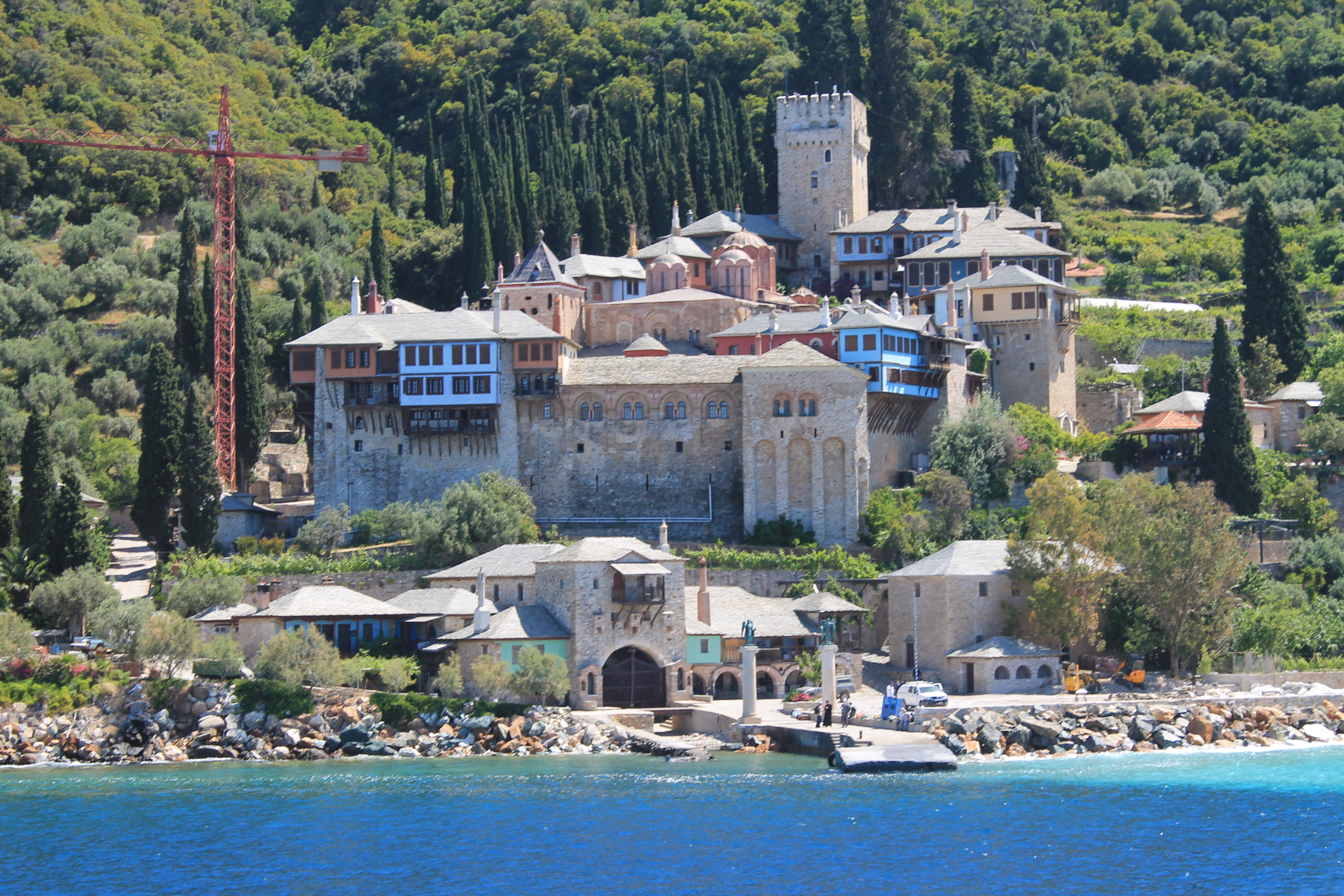
- External view of the monastery.

- Location within Mount Athos
- Interactive map of Docheiariou

Monastery information
- Full name: Holy Monastery of Docheiariou
- Dedication: Archangels Michael and Gabriel
- Diocese: Mount Athos

People
- Founder: Blessed Euthymius
- Prior: Archimandrite Elder Amfilochios

Site
- Location: Mount Athos, Greece
- Coordinates: 40°15′59″N 24°10′24″E
- Public access: Men only

The Docheiariou monastery (Greek: Μονή Δοχειαρίου) is an Eastern Orthodox monastery at the monastic state of Mount Athos in Greece.

The Panagia Gorgoepikoos Church is located in the monastery complex.

== History ==
Founded in the late 10th or early 11th century, Docheiariou is dedicated to the memory of the Archangels Michael and Gabriel. It celebrates its patronal feastday on November 8 (21, Gregorian style).

By the end of the 15th century according to the Russian pilgrim Isaiah, the monastery was Serb.

In 1979, Docheiariou became a cenobitic monastery when Elder Gregorios (d. 22 October 2018) arrived there from Missolonghi with a group of ten monks.

Docheiariou ranks tenth in the hierarchy of the Athonite monasteries. It houses the icon of the Virgin "Gorgoepikoos" or "She Who is Quick to Hear [Prayers]". In its library are 545 manuscripts, 62 of which are on parchment, and more than 5,000 printed books. In 2011 Docheiariou had 53 monks.
