= A Plain Introduction to the Criticism of the New Testament =

Book by Frederick Henry Ambrose Scrivener

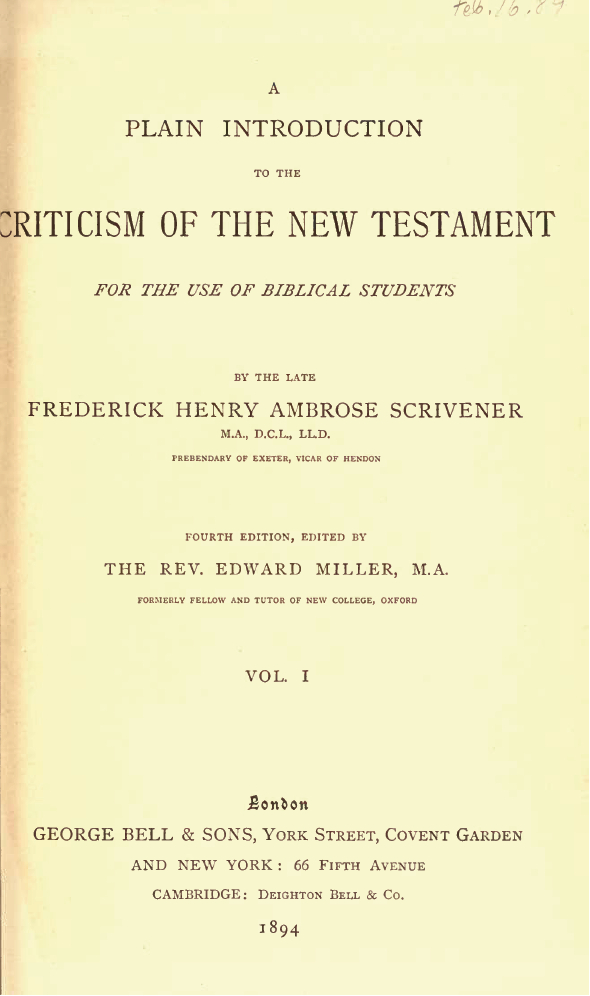
- Title page from the 4th edition
- Author: Frederick Henry Ambrose Scrivener
- Language: English
- Publisher: George Bell & Sons
- Publication date: 1861, 1894
- Pages: 418 + 428
- ISBN: 1-4021-6347-9

A Plain Introduction to the Criticism of the New Testament: For the Use of Biblical Students is a book by Frederick Henry Ambrose Scrivener (1813–1891), biblical scholar and textual critic. In this book Scrivener listed over 3,000 Greek manuscripts of the New Testament, as well as manuscripts of early versions. It was used by Caspar René Gregory for further work.

== Summary of Editions ==
The book was published in four editions:

Edition	Published in	Pages	Volumes
1	1861	506	1
2	1874	626	1
3	Vol. 1: 1883; Vol. 2: 1887	751	2
4	1894	874	2

The fourth edition of the book was reprinted in 2005 by Elibron Classics.

== First Edition ==
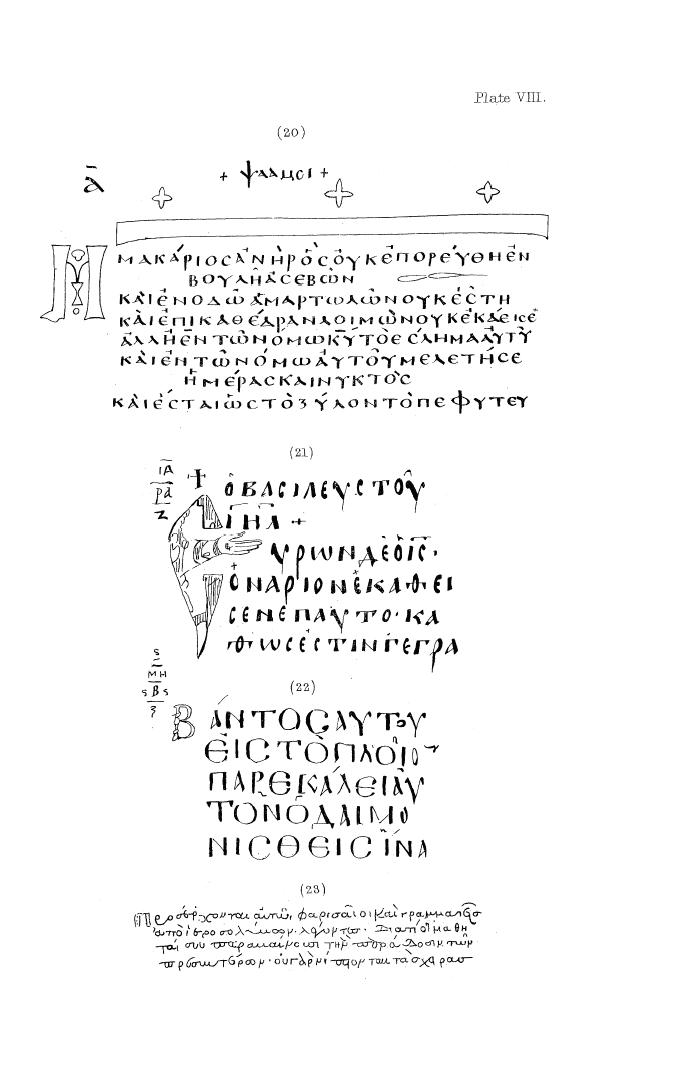
Plate VIII with facsimiles from Codices Vaticanus, Regius, Nanianus, and Basilensis

The text of the first edition was divided into nine chapters, and three Indices were added at the end (pp. 465–490). All plates were placed at the end of book (after Indices). The main part of the work contains descriptions of the manuscripts. Scrivener concentrated his attention on the most important manuscripts (especially five larger uncial codices). The later cursive manuscripts were too numerous to be described in as much detail as the uncials. Scrivener described them with all possible brevity, dwelling only on a few which presented points of special interest. He used a system of certain abbreviations. A list of these abbreviations was included just before the Catalogue of cursive manuscripts. Examples of abbreviations are:

Act. — MS. of Acts and Catholic epistles
Am. — the Ammonian Sections
Eus. — the Eusebian Canons
Eus. t. — a table of the Eusebian Canons
Carp. — Epistula ad Carpianum
κεφ. — the numbers of the κεφαλαια majora stand in the margin
κεφ. t. — the tables of the κεφαλαια are prefixed to each book
τιτλ. — the τιτλοι are given at the head or foot of the page
lect. — the book is adapted for Church-reading by notices of the proper lessons, feasts etc. in the margin, or above, or below
men. — a menology, calendar of Saints' Days, is found at the beginning or end of the book.
syn. — Synaxarion, a calendar of the daily lessons throughout the year is given.
mut. — the copy described is mutilated.
pict. — the copy is illuminated with pictures.
prol. — contains prolegomena before the several books

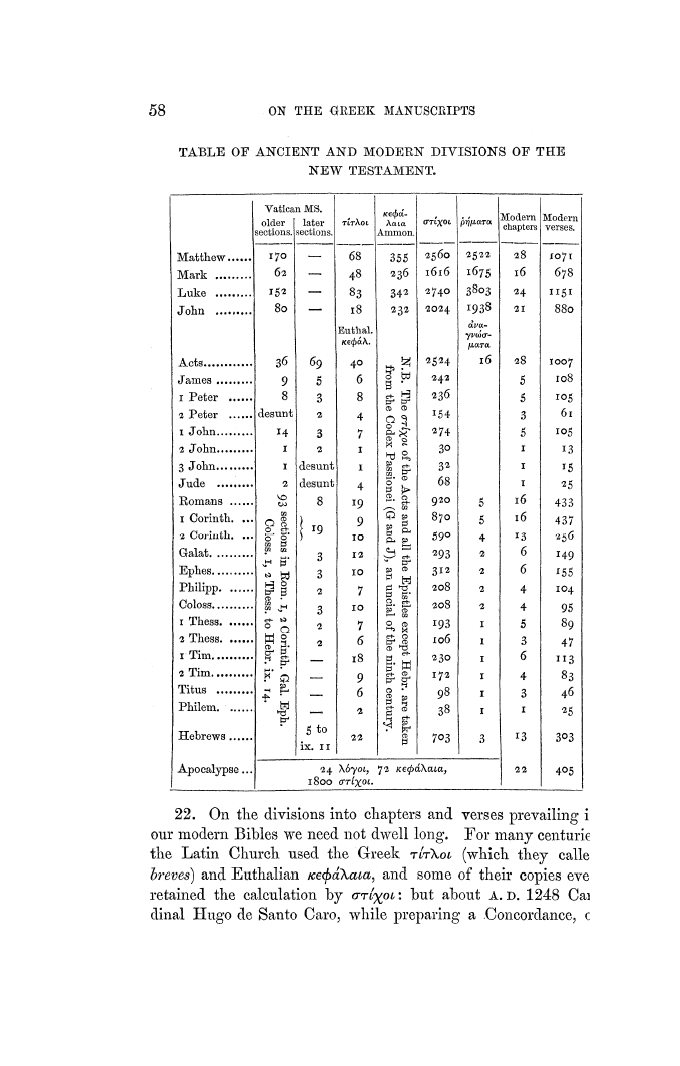
Table of ancient and modern divisions of the New Testament, on page 58 of the 1st edition

In every later edition of the Plain Introduction this system of abbreviations was expanded (e.g. Αναγ., Argent., etc.). At the end of the lists the manuscripts are described more briefly, in two columns, giving only the numbers of the manuscripts, with the corresponding number used in the other cataloguing system (that of biblical scholar Johann M. A. Scholz):

227. (= Act. 56 of Scholz).; 229. (= Evan. 228).; 231. (= Act. 185).; 233. (= Evan. 462).; 235. (= Evan. 466).; 237. (= Evan. 189).; 241. (= Act. 97).; 243. (= Act. 182), two codices.; 245. (= Act. 191).	228. (= Evan. 226).; 230. (= Evan. 368).; 232. (= Act. 184).; 234. (= Evan. 457).; 236. (= Act. 188).; 238. (= Evan. 431).; 240. (= Evan. 444).; 244. (= Act. 190).; 246. (= Act. 192).

In the preface to the first edition, the editor announced:

The following pages are chiefly designed for the use of those who have no previous knowledge of the Textual Criticism of the New Testament; but since the Author has endeavoured to embody in them the results of very recent investigations, he hopes that they may prove of service to more advanced students. He asks the reader's indulgence for the annexed list of Addenda et Corrigenda, both by reason of the peculiar character of his work, and the remoteness of West Cornwall from Public Libraries. He might easily have suppressed the greater part of them, but that he has honestly tried to be accurate, and sees no cause to be ashamed of what Person has well called "the common lot of authorship." He has only to add that he has not consciously borrowed from other writers without due acknowledgement, and to return his best thanks to the Rev. H. O. Coxe for important aid in the Bodleian, and to Henry Bradshaw Esq., Fellow of King's College, for valuable instruction respecting manuscripts in the University Library at Cambridge.

Falmouth, September, 1861.

== Second edition ==
In 1873 Dean Burgon in The Guardian published several articles with some suggestions, corrections, and encouragement for preparing the second edition of Plain Introduction. Burgon gave a photograph of the Codex Basilensis for the sake of the next edition (the facsimile from the first edition was a poor quality).

The second edition was published in 1874. The number of chapters was still the same, but they were expanded (especially chapter II and IX). Many corrections to the third section of the second chapter were made after suggestions of: H. Bradshaw, Hort, Vansittart, Kelly, and Burgon. In the preface to the second edition, the editor announced:

The first edition of this work, published in 1861, was received so favourably that the author has felt bound to bestow his utmost care upon a minute and thorough revision of his book, in the hope of bringing up the information it contains to the existing state of knowledge. In this endeavour he has been assisted as well by Canon Lightfoot, to whom he is indebted for that section of the third chapter which treats of Egyptian versions of the New Testament (pp. 319–357), as also by much unsought for and most welcome help, especially on the part of those scholars who are named in p. 164, note. Without wishing to speak harshly of writers who are not very scrupulous in such matters, he has always thought it became him to borrow from no quarter without making a full and frank avowal of the fact. The author will be much rejoiced if this new edition shall be judged not less worthy than its predecessor to become a text book in Universities and Theological Celleges.

S. Gerrans, August, 1861.

== Third edition ==
In August, 1874, Ezra Abbot sent to Scrivener a letter; the rough draft of this covered forty-odd pages, devoted to the correction of apparent errors and a statement of overlooked facts in the first edition of the Plain Introduction. The letter came too late to be used in preparing the body of the second edition of Scrivener's work. Abbot's studies largely argumented the number of suggestions, particularly in those portions of the book devoted to describing the extant manuscripts. They were accumulated in great part to the older and well-known authorities, such as Griesbach, Matthaei, Scholz (particularly his work Biblisch-kritische Reise, Leipzig 1823), Bianchini, Montfaucon, Silvestre, Bandini, Laubecius, and Zaeagni. Some of these suggestions were a result of Abbott's studies of recent edited Catalogues of the ancient Greek manuscripts held in the British Museum, Bodleian Library, Oxford Catalogues, Kitchin's Catalogue of the manuscripts in the Library of Christ Church College (Oxford, 1867). Abbott added numerous references to facsimile editions.

In 1885 J. Rendel Harris, together with Abbot, prepared a work similar to the first unpublished work of Abbot, nine years earlier. It was published under the title: Notes on Scriveners' "Plain introduction to the criticism of the New Testament," 3rd edition, in which they proposed corrections. Example of corrections:

Page XII. On "p. 69. note", line 2, for "360" read "1160".
Page XIII. On "p. 141, line 28", line 2, for "Vol. II., Part I." read "Part I, Vol. II.". At end. add "after p. 492."
Page XIV. On "Y", line 8, for "XXIII, 23" read "XXIII, 5"; line 9, for "II, 21-IV. 1; 15-v. 1" read simply "II. 21-v.I" - since Dr. Gregory discovered two additional leaves; see the Prolegomena, to Tischendorf, p. 440.
On "p. 162, line 24", line 2, for "Vol. II., Pt. I." read "Pt. I. Vol. II."

The third edition was issued in two volumes, with an increase of chapters in each (XIV + XII). This edition was prepared under great disadvantage: Scrivener had an attack of paralysis after adding 125 pages to his book. As a result, his work was not wholly at the same high standard as his previous publications. The framework of the second edition was originally adopted; and the new additional material was only added to the almost unchanged material.

== Fourth edition ==
The fourth and the last edition of Plain Introduction was prepared and edited posthumously by Edward Miller (1825–1901). The book was edited by George Bell & Sons. It contains 15 plates with the texts of 40 manuscripts in facsimile (the 1st edition had 12 plates with 36 manuscripts). Some facsimiles were replaced. Instead of 2,094 manuscripts, as recorded in the third edition under six classes, no less than 3,791 were recorded in this edition, an increase of 236 beyond the 3,555 of Gregory, without counting the numerous vacant places which had been filled in.

Most of the accounts of ancient versions were rewritten by distinguished scholars, who were leaders in their several departments. The early part of Volume I was enriched from the admirable book on "Greek and Latin Palaeography", by Edward Maunde Thompson. Many corrections suggested by eminent scholars were introduced in different places throughout the book. H. J. White rewrote the chapter on Latin versions. G. H. Gwilliam, editor of the Peshitta, helped to improve the passages on the Peshitta and the Curetonian Version. H. Deane made an additions to the treatment of the Harkleian Version. A. C. Headlam made a revision of the long chapter on the Egyptian versions; F. C. Conybeare, rewrote the sections on the Armenian and Georgian versions; Margoliouth rewrote the sections on the Arabic and Ethiopic versions; J. M. Bebb rewrote the section on the Slavonic version; James W. Bright rewrote the section on the Anglo-Saxon Version.

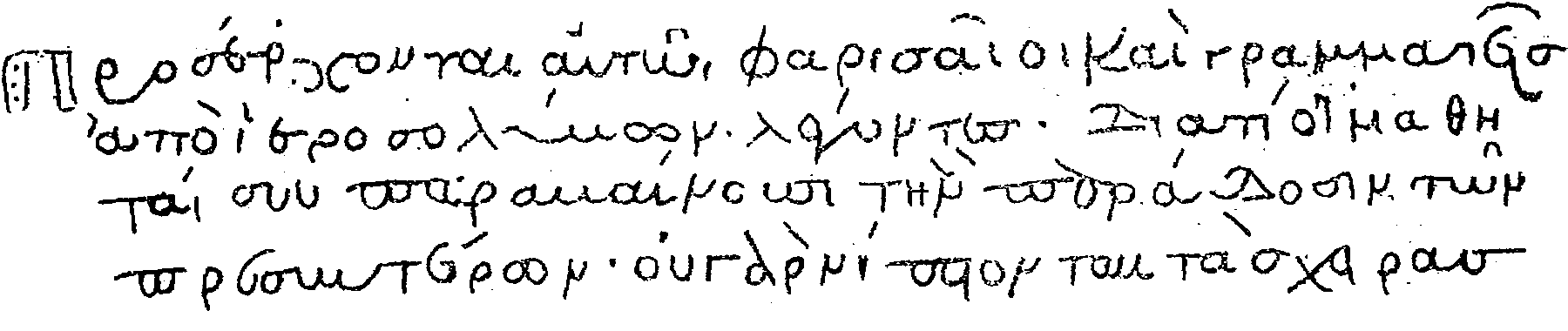
Facsimile of minuscule 1 in the 1st edition (1861)

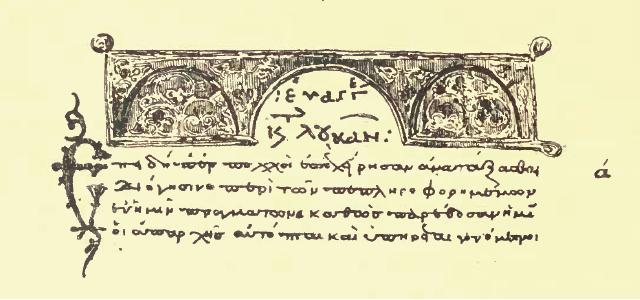
Facsimile of minuscule 1 in the 2nd, 3rd, and 4th edition (1894)

Facsimile of Codex Cyprius (1861)

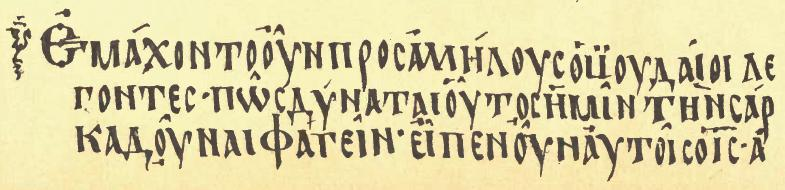
Facsimile of Codex Cyprius (1894)

== Contents of the 4th edition ==
=== Volume I ===
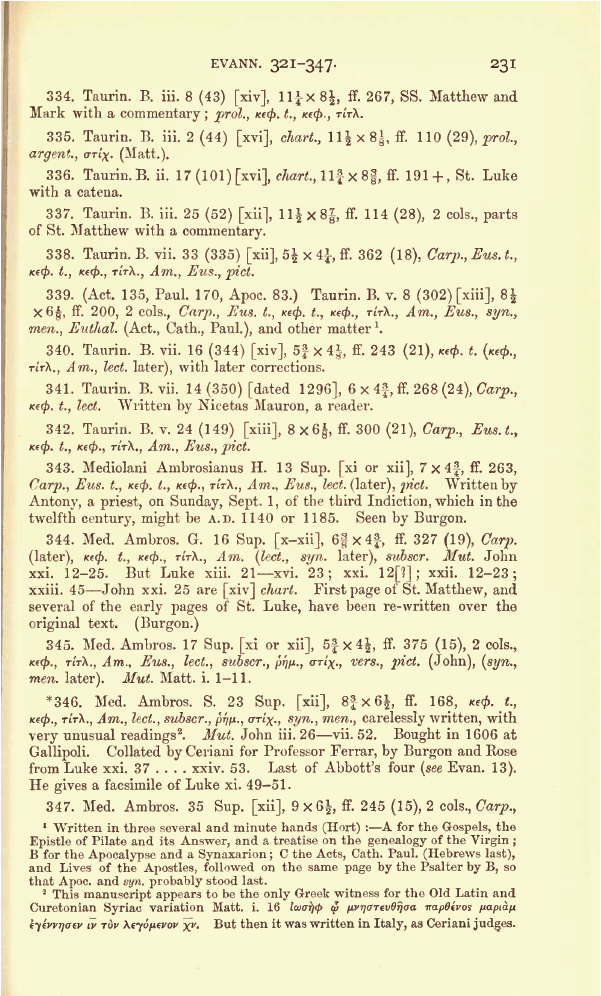
Page 231, vol. I, from the 4th Edition

- Chapter I, pages 1–20 – Preliminary considerations
- Chapter II, pages 21–55 – General character of the Greek manuscripts of the New Testament (materials for writing, style of writings, abbreviations).
- Chapter III, pages 56–89 – Divisions of the text, and other particulars (Ammoniam Sections, Eusebian Canons, Euthalian chapters, subscriptions, marginal markings, Synaxarion, Menologion)
- Chapter IV, pages 90–130 – The larger uncial manuscripts of the Greek Testament (Sinaiticus, Alexandrinus, Vaticanus, Ephraemi and Bezae)
- Chapter V, pages 131–168 – Uncial manuscripts of the Gospels
- Chapter VI, pages 169–188 – Uncial manuscripts of the Acts and Catholic epistles, of St. Paul's epistles, and of the Apocalypse
- Chapter VII, pages 189–240 – Cursive manuscripts of the Gospels. Part I. 1-449
- Chapter VIII, pages 241–271 – Cursive manuscripts of the Gospels. Part II. 450-774
- Chapter IX, pages 272–283 – Cursive manuscripts of the Gospels. Part III. 775-1321
- Chapter X, pages 284–306 – Cursive manuscripts of the Acts and Catholic epistles, 1-420
- Chapter XI, pages 307–319 – Cursive manuscripts of St. Paul's epistles, 1-491
- Chapter XII, pages 320–326 – Cursive manuscripts of the Apocalypse, 1-184
- Chapter XIII, pages 327–367 – Evangelistaries, or Manuscript Service-Books of the Gospels, 1-963
- Chapter XIV, pages 368–376 – Lectionaries containing the Apostolos or Praxapostolos, 1-288

=== Volume II ===
- Chapter I, pages 1–5 – Ancient Versions
- Chapter II, pages 6–40 – Syriac Versions (Peshitta, Curetonian, Harklean, Palestinian)
- Chapter III, pages 41–90 – Latin Versions (Old Latin, Vulgate)
- Chapter IV, pages 91–144 – Egyptian or Coptic Versions (Bohairic, Sahidic, Fayyumic, Akhmimim)
- Chapter V, pages 145–166 – The Other Versions of the New Testament (Gothic, Armenian, Georgian, Ethiopian, Arabic)
- Chapter VI, pages 167–174 – Quotations from the Fathers
- Chapter VII, pages 175–243 – Early Printed Editions, Critical Editions (Complutensian Polyglote, Novum Instrumentum omne, Editio Regia)
- Chapter VIII, pages 244–256 – Textual Canons
- Chapter IX, pages 257–273 – History of the Text
- Chapter X, pages 274–311 – Recent Views of Comparative Criticism
- Chapter XI, pages 312–320 – Character of the Dialect of the Greek Testament
- Chapter XII, pages 321–413 – Application of Principles to Select Passages

== Reception ==
Edward Miller, the editor of the 4th edition, in 1886 appraised the 3rd edition as follows:

The labour spent by Dr. Scrivener upon Textual Criticism is well known from his admirable Introduction to the Science, a handbook which leaves hardly anything, if anything, to be desired.

Eberhard Nestle, editor of Novum Testamentum Graece, wrote in 1901:

Scrivener has rendered great service in the way of collating manuscripts, (...) and Gregory in Germany has also catalogued them.

Another textual critic, Caspar René Gregory, in his Textkritik des Neuen Testaments (1900–1909) very often cited the work of Scrivener, but after Minuscule 449 he used a different system for numbering the manuscripts (Scrivener 450 = Gregory 581, Scrivener 451 = Gregory 582). A Plain Introduction... was also used by Hermann von Soden in his Die Schriften des Neuen Testaments.

== See also ==
- Biblical manuscript
- Critical apparatus
- Textual criticism of the New Testament
- Textual variants in the New Testament
