= List of New Testament minuscules (701–800) =

A New Testament minuscule is a copy of a portion of the New Testament written in a small, cursive Greek script (developed from Uncial).

== Legend ==
- The numbers (#) are the now standard system of Caspar René Gregory, often referred to as the Gregory-Aland numbers.
- Included among the cataloged minuscules are the following types of manuscripts, color coded:

Grey represents continuous text manuscripts containing only New Testament portions
Beige represents manuscripts with New Testament portions and a catena (quotations from church fathers)
Light cyan represents manuscripts of single-author commentaries who included the full Scripture text.
Light red represents manuscripts of single-author commentaries who included both the full Scripture text and a catena.
Light purple represents manuscripts of commentaries where the Scripture text was abridged.
White represents manuscript numbers no longer in use.

- Dates are estimated to the nearest 100 year increment where specific date is unknown.
- Content generally only describes sections of the New Testament: Gospels, The Acts of the Apostles (Acts), Pauline epistles, and so on. Sometimes the surviving portion of a codex is so limited that specific books, chapters or even verses can be indicated. Linked articles, where they exist, generally specify content in detail, by verse.
- Digital images are referenced with direct links to the hosting web pages, with the exception of those at the INTF. The quality and accessibility of the images is as follows:

Gold color indicates high resolution color images available online.
Tan color indicates high resolution color images available locally, not online.
Light tan color indicates only a small fraction of manuscript pages with color images available online.
Light gray color indicates black/white or microfilm images available online.
Light blue color indicates manuscript not imaged, and is currently lost or ownership unknown.
Light pink color indicates manuscript destroyed, presumed destroyed, or deemed too fragile to digitize.
Violet color indicates high resolution ultraviolet images available online.

† Indicates the manuscript has damaged or missing pages.
^{P} Indicates only a portion of the books were included.
^{K} Indicates manuscript also includes a commentary.
^{S} Indicates lost portions of manuscript replaced via supplement of a later hand.
^{abs} (abschrift) Indicates manuscript is copy.
[ ] Brackets around Gregory-Aland number indicate the manuscript belongs to an already numbered manuscript, was found to not be a continuous text manuscript, was found to be written in modern Greek versus Koine Greek, was proved a forgery, or has been destroyed.

== Minuscules 701-800 ==
#	Date	Contents	Pages	Institution and refs.	City, State	Country	Images
701	14th	Gospels	170	Owner unknown			
702	12th	Gospels†	143	John Rylands University Library, Gr. Ms. 16	Manchester	UK	INTF
703	11th	Gospels	409	The Huntington Library, HM 1081	San Marino, CA	USA	INTF, CSNTM
703	11th	Gospels	409	The Huntington Library, HM 1081	San Marino, CA	USA	THL
[704] = 2284							
705	13th	Luke, John	254	Dumbarton Oaks, Ms. 4, acc. no. 74.1	Washington, D.C.	USA	HL
706	13th	Gospels	213	Bodleian Library, MS. Auct. T. 5. 34	Oxford	UK	INTF
706	13th	Gospels	213	Bodleian Library, MS. Auct. T. 5. 34	Oxford	UK	BL
707	11th	Gospels	150	Bodleian Library, MS. Auct. T. inf. 2. 6	Oxford	UK	INTF
707	11th	Gospels	150	Bodleian Library, MS. Auct. T. inf. 2. 6	Oxford	UK	BL
708	11th	Gospels†	200	Bodleian Library, MS. Auct. T. inf. 1. 3	Oxford	UK	INTF
709	11th	Gospels†	140	Bodleian Library, MS. Auct. T. inf. 1. 4	Oxford	UK	INTF
709	11th	Gospels†	140	Bodleian Library, MS. Auct. T. inf. 1. 4	Oxford	UK	BL
710	13th	Gospels†	183	Bodleian Library, MS. Auct. T. inf. 1. 5	Oxford	UK	INTF
711	11th	Gospels†	236	Bodleian Library, Oriel College Ms. 83	Oxford	UK	INTF
712 + [2164]	11th	Gospels, Acts, Pauline Epistles, General Epistles	240	University of California, Dep. of Special Collections, 170/347	Los Angeles, CA	USA	UCLA
712 + [2164]	11th	Gospels, Acts, Pauline Epistles, General Epistles	5	Russian National Library, Gr. 320 (Jude 12-25)	Saint Petersburg	Russia	INTF
713	12th	Gospels†	363	University of Birmingham Cadbury Research Library, Peckover, Gr. 7	Birmingham	UK	UoB INTF
714	13th	Gospels†	338	British Library, Egerton MS 2783	London	UK	BL
714	13th	Gospels†	338	British Library, Egerton MS 2783	London	UK	INTF
715	13th	Gospels	176	British Library, Egerton MS 2785	London	UK	BL
716	14th	Gospels	213	British Library, Egerton MS 2784	London	UK	BL
716	14th	Gospels	213	British Library, Egerton MS 2784	London	UK	INTF
717	11th/12th	Gospels	277	Cheltenham Ladies' College, Dep. e 175	Cheltenham	UK	INTF
718	14th	Gospels†	254	Gonville and Caius College, Ms. 781/819	Cambridge	UK	INTF
719	1196	Theophylact Commentary on the Gospels	314	Austrian National Library, Theol. gr. 19, fol. 1-314	Vienna	Austria	INTF, CSNTM
720	1138-9	Theophylact Commentary on Gospels, Pauline Epistles, General Epistles	296	Austrian National Library, Theol. gr. 79, 80,	Vienna	Austria	INTF, CSNTM
721	12th	Theophylact Commentary on Mark, Luke	502	Austrian National Library, Theol. gr. 90	Vienna	Austria	INTF, CSNTM
722	15th	Theophylact Commentary on Matthew, Mark, Luke	140	Austrian National Library, Theol. gr. 95, fol. 135-274	Vienna	Austria	INTF, CSNTM
723	15th	Theophylact Commentary on the Gospels	397	Austrian National Library, Theol. gr. 122	Vienna	Austria	INTF, CSNTM
724	1520	Gospels	203	Austrian National Library, Suppl. gr. 175	Vienna	Austria	INTF, CSNTM
725	13th	Gospels	210	Royal Library of Belgium, 11358	Brussels	Belgium	INTF
726	13th	Gospels	250	Royal Library of Belgium, 11375	Brussels	Belgium	INTF, CSNTM
727	14th	Theophylact Commentary on the Gospels†	246	National Library, Grec 179	Paris	France	BnF, CSNTM
728	14th	Theophylact Commentary on the Gospels	231	National Library, Grec 181	Paris	France	BnF, INTF, CSNTM
729	13th	Theophylact Commentary on the Gospels	341	National Library, Grec 182, fol. 1-341 (fol. 342 ℓ 61)	Paris	France	BnF, INTF, CSNTM
730	14th	Zigabenus Commentary on the Gospels†	331	National Library, Grec 183	Paris	France	BnF, INTF, CSNTM
731	14th	Theophylact Commentary on the Gospels	426	National Library, Grec 184	Paris	France	BnF, INTF, CSNTM
732	13th	Theophylact Commentary on the Gospels	271	National Library, Grec 185	Paris	France	BnF, INTF, CSNTM
733	12th	Theophylact Commentary on the Gospels	347	National Library, Grec 190	Paris	France	INTF
734	14th	Theophylact Commentary on Matthew, Luke, John	297	National Library, Grec 192	Paris	France	BnF, CSNTM
735	15th	Theophylact Commentary on Matthew†, Luke^{S}†	164	National Library, Grec 196	Paris	France	BnF, INTF, CSNTM
736	12th	Theophylact Commentary on Matthew, John	235	National Library, Grec 198	Paris	France	BnF
737	13th	Theophylact Commentary on Matthew	176	National Library, Grec 204	Paris	France	BnF, CSNTM
738	1327	Theophylact Commentary on Matthew	81	National Library, Grec 205	Paris	France	BnF, INTF, CSNTM
739	15th	Theophylact Commentary on Luke†	48	National Library, Grec 207	Paris	France	INTF
740	1318	Theophylact Commentary on the Gospels	444	National Library, Grec 234	Paris	France	BnF, INTF
741	14th	Theophylact Commentary on the Gospels	362	National Library, Grec 235	Paris	France	BnF
742	15th	Theophylact Commentary on John	160	National Library, Grec 1775	Paris	France	BnF
743	14th	Nicetas Catena and John, 1-3 John (no commentary), Revelation	401	National Library, Supplement Grec 159, fol. 2-7.12-406	Paris	France	BnF, INTF
744	13th	Theophylact Commentary on the Gospels†	367	National Library, Supplement Grec 219	Paris	France	BnF, INTF
745	16th	Gospels	212	National Library, Supplement Grec 227	Paris	France	INTF
746	11th	Gospels	396	National Library, Supplement Grec 611	Paris	France	BnF
747	1164	Gospels	376	National Library, Supplement Grec 612	Paris	France	BnF
748	12th	Gospels†	278	National Library, Supplement Grec 903	Paris	France	BnF
749	13th	Theophylact Commentary on the Gospels†	199	National Library, Supplement Grec 904	Paris	France	BnF
750	12th	Gospels	319	National Library, Supplement Grec 914	Paris	France	BnF
750	12th	Gospels	319	National Library, Supplement Grec 914	Paris	France	INTF
751	13th	Matthew 2:13-9:17†	19	National Library, Supplement Grec 919	Paris	France	BnF, INTF
752	12th	Gospels	199	National Library, Supplement Grec 927	Paris	France	INTF
753	11th	Matthew 23:11-21†	1	National Library, Supplement Grec 1035, 8, fol. 12	Paris	France	INTF
754	11th	Gospels	464	National Library, Supplement Grec 1076	Paris	France	BnF
755	16th	Gospels	332	National Library, Supplement Grec 1080	Paris	France	BnF
756	11th	Gospels†	179	National Library, Supplement Grec 1083	Paris	France	BnF
757	13th	New Testament†	414	National Library, 150	Athens	Greece	CSNTM
757	13th	New Testament†	414	National Library, 150	Athens	Greece	INTF
758	14th	Gospels	302	National Library, 151	Athens	Greece	CSNTM
759	13th	Gospels	298	National Library, 152	Athens	Greece	CSNTM
760	12th	Gospels	284	National Library, 153	Athens	Greece	CSNTM
760	12th	Gospels	1	National Library, 153	Athens	Greece	CSNTM
761	14th	Gospels	281	National Library, 154	Athens	Greece	CSNTM
762	14th	Gospels	332	National Library, 155	Athens	Greece	CSNTM
763	14th	Gospels	324	National Library, 156	Athens	Greece	CSNTM
764	14th	Gospels†	332	National Library, 157	Athens	Greece	CSNTM
765	12th	Gospels	200	National Library, 158	Athens	Greece	CSNTM
765	12th	Gospels	200	National Library, 158	Athens	Greece	INTF
766	13th	Gospels	316	National Library, 159	Athens	Greece	CSNTM
[767] = 1281							
768	12th	Gospels†	222	National Library, 161	Athens	Greece	CSNTM
769	14th	Gospels	253	National Library, 161	Athens	Greece	CSNTM
770	12th	Matthew†, John	270	National Library, 203	Athens	Greece	CSNTM
771	10th	Gospels†	153	National Library, 204	Athens	Greece	CSNTM
771	10th	Gospels†	153	National Library, 204	Athens	Greece	CSNTM (25)
771	10th	Gospels†	153	National Library, 204	Athens	Greece	INTF
772	14th	Theophylact Commentary on the Gospels†	390	National Library, 489	Athens	Greece	CSNTM
772	14th	Theophylact Commentary on the Gospels†	390	National Library, 489	Athens	Greece	INTF
773	10th	Gospels	285	National Library, 56	Athens	Greece	CSNTM
773	10th	Gospels	285	National Library, 56	Athens	Greece	INTF
774	11th	Gospels	370	National Library, 57	Athens	Greece	CSNTM
774	11th	Gospels	370	National Library, 57	Athens	Greece	INTF
775	13th	Gospels	223	National Library, 58	Athens	Greece	CSNTM
776	11th	Gospels	387	National Library, 76	Athens	Greece	CSNTM
776	11th	Gospels	387	National Library, 76	Athens	Greece	INTF
777	12th	Gospels	185	National Library, 93	Athens	Greece	CSNTM
778	12th	Gospels	195	National Library, 80	Athens	Greece	CSNTM
778	12th	Gospels	195	National Library, 80	Athens	Greece	INTF
779	12th	Gospels	171	National Library, 127	Athens	Greece	CSNTM
780	11th	Gospels	241	National Library, 121	Athens	Greece	CSNTM
780	11th	Gospels	241	National Library, 121	Athens	Greece	INTF
781	14th	Gospels†	199	National Library, 110	Athens	Greece	CSNTM
782	12th	Gospels	277	National Library, 81	Athens	Greece	CSNTM
782	12th	Gospels	277	National Library, 81	Athens	Greece	CSNTM (1)
782	12th	Gospels	277	National Library, 81	Athens	Greece	INTF
783	14th	Gospels	212	National Library, 71	Athens	Greece	CSNTM
783	14th	Gospels	212	National Library, 71	Athens	Greece	INTF
784	14th	Gospels†	161	National Library, 87	Athens	Greece	CSNTM
785	11th	Gospels	231	National Library, 118	Athens	Greece	CSNTM
785	11th	Gospels	231	National Library, 118	Athens	Greece	CSNTM (1)
785	11th	Gospels	231	National Library, 118	Athens	Greece	INTF
786	14th	Gospels	293	National Library, 125	Athens	Greece	CSNTM
787	12th	Gospels	305	National Library, 108	Athens	Greece	CSNTM
787	12th	Gospels	305	National Library, 108	Athens	Greece	INTF
788	11th	Gospels	219	National Library, 74	Athens	Greece	CSNTM
788	11th	Gospels	219	National Library, 74	Athens	Greece	INTF
789	14th	Gospels†	250	National Library, 134	Athens	Greece	CSNTM
790	14th	Gospels†	240	National Library, 86	Athens	Greece	CSNTM
791	12th	Gospels	229	National Library, 77	Athens	Greece	CSNTM
791	12th	Gospels	229	National Library, 77	Athens	Greece	INTF
792	13th	Gospels, Revelation	145	National Library, 107	Athens	Greece	CSNTM
792	13th	Gospels, Revelation	145	National Library, 107	Athens	Greece	INTF
793	12th	Gospels	252	National Library, 75	Athens	Greece	CSNTM
793	12th	Gospels	252	National Library, 75	Athens	Greece	INTF
794	14th	Gospels, Acts, Pauline Epistles†, General Epistles	256	National Library, 122	Athens	Greece	CSNTM
794	14th	Gospels, Acts, Pauline Epistles†, General Epistles	256	National Library, 122	Athens	Greece	INTF
795	14th	Gospels	325	National Library, 109	Athens	Greece	CSNTM
796	11th	Gospels, Acts, Pauline Epistles, General Epistles†	318	National Library, 160	Athens	Greece	CSNTM
796	11th	Gospels, Acts, Pauline Epistles, General Epistles†	318	National Library, 160	Athens	Greece	INTF
797	14th	Gospels	224	National Library, 111	Athens	Greece	CSNTM
798 + [2447]	11th	Gospels†	116	National Library, 137	Athens	Greece	CSNTM
798 + [2447]	11th	Gospels†	148	INTF, Ms. 7	Münster	Germany	CSNTM, INTF
799	11th	Gospels	367	National Library, 117	Athens	Greece	CSNTM
799	11th	Gospels	367	National Library, 117	Athens	Greece	INTF
800	12th	Gospels†	217	National Library, 65	Athens	Greece	CSNTM

[top]

== See also ==
- List of New Testament papyri
- List of New Testament uncials
- List of New Testament minuscules (1–1000)
- List of New Testament minuscules (1001–2000)
- List of New Testament minuscules (2001–)
- List of New Testament minuscules ordered by Location/Institution
- List of New Testament lectionaries

== Bibliography ==
- Aland, Kurt; M. Welte; B. Köster; K. Junack (1994). Kurzgefasste Liste der griechischen Handschriften des Neues Testaments. Berlin, New York: Walter de Gruyter. p. 95. ISBN 3-11-011986-2.
- "Liste Handschriften". Münster: Institute for New Testament Textual Research.
