= 720 (disambiguation) =

720 most commonly refers to:

- 720 (number)
- AD 720, a year in the Gregorian calendar
- 720 BC, a year in the Gregorian calendar
- 720 AUC, a year in the Julian calendar

720 may also refer to:

== Arts, entertainment, and media ==
- 720°, a 1986 skateboarding video game
- Minuscule 720, a Greek minuscule manuscript

== Places ==
- Area code 720, an area code in Colorado, United States
- 720 Park Avenue, a historic residential building in New York City, New York, United States

== Science and technology ==
- 720 AM, a radio frequency
- 720 Bohlinia, a minor planet
- 720p, a progressive HDTV signal format
- Lenovo IdeaPad 720, a discontinued brand of notebook computers

== Transportation ==
=== Aircraft ===
- Boeing 720, an American narrow-body airliner

=== Automobiles ===
- Lifan 720, a Chinese mid-size sedan
- McLaren 720S, a British sports car

=== Rail transportation ===
- British Rail Class 720, a class of electric multiple unit trains
- New South Wales 620/720 class railcar, a class of diesel multiple unit trains
- South Australian Railways 720 class, a class of 2-8-4 steam locomotives

=== Roads and routes ===
- List of highways numbered 720

== Other uses ==
- 720 Naval Air Squadron, a former Naval Air Squadron of the Royal Navy's Fleet Air Arm
