= Minuscule 686 =

- New Testament manuscript
- Text: Gospels
- Date: 1337
- Script: Greek
- Now at: British Library
- Size: 22 cm by 15.8 cm
- Type: Byzantine text-type
- Category: V
- Hand: coarsely written
- Note: thick vellum

Minuscule 686 (in the Gregory-Aland numbering), Θ^{ε34} (von Soden), is a Greek minuscule manuscript of the New Testament, on parchment. It is dated by a colophon to the year 1337. Some leaves of the manuscript were lost. Scrivener labelled it by 573^{e}.

== Description ==
The codex contains the text of the four Gospels, on 226 parchment leaves (size 22 cm by 15.8 cm), with only two lacunae (Matthew 1:1-6:18; Luke 24:47-53). The text is written in one column per page, 29 lines per page. The breathings and accents are remarkable incorrect.

It contains the Epistula ad Carpianum, the Eusebian tables, tables of the κεφαλαια (contents) are placed before each Gospel, numbers of the κεφαλαια (chapters) are given at the left margin, the τιτλοι (titles) at the top, the Ammonian Sections, without a references to the Eusebian Canons, subscriptions at the end of each of the Gospels of Matthew and Mark (Jerusalem Colophon), numbered stichoi, Synaxarion, and Menologion.

According to Scrivener the manuscript is "coarsely written on thick vellum".

== Text ==
The Greek text of the codex is a representative of the Byzantine text-type. Kurt Aland placed it in Category V.

According to the Claremont Profile Method it creates textual cluster 686, along with the manuscripts 716 (Luke 20), 748, 1198 (Luke 1 and 10), and 2693 (Luke 1). The cluster has following profile (the word before the bracket is the reading of the UBS edition):

Luke 1:

- Luke 1:10 — ην του λαου ] του λαου ην
- Luke 1:15 — του ] omit
- Luke 1:34 — εσται ] εσται μοι
- Luke 1:44 — εν αγαλλιασει το βρεφος ] το βρεφος εν αγαλλιασει
- Luke 1:50 — γενεας και γενεας ] γενεαν και γενεαν TR reads: γενεας και γενεαν
- Luke 1:63 — εστι(ν) ] εσται
- Luke 1:65 — παντα ] omit

Luke 10:

- Luke 10:1 — ημελλεν ] εμελλεν
- Luke 10:6 — εαν ] εαν μεν
- Luke 10:11 — εις τους ποδας ] omit
- Luke 10:12 — λεγω ] λεγω δε
- Luke 10:36 — πλησιον δοκει σοι ] δοκει σοι πλησιον

Luke 20:

- Luke 20:1 — αρχιερεις ] ιερεις
- Luke 20:9 — τις ] omit
- Luke 20:19 — τον λαον ] οχλον
- Luke 20:24 — δηναριον ] δηναριον οι δε εδειξαν και ειπε
- Luke 20:27 — αντιλεγοντες ] λεγοντες
- Luke 20:34 (61 reading) — γαμισκονται ] εκγαμιζονται (TR reads: εκγαμισκονται)
- Luke 20:35 (62 reading) — γαμιζονται ] εκγαμιζονται (TR reads: εκγαμισκονται)

== History ==
According to the colophon the manuscript was written by monk Gregorius in 1337. It was bought by John Jackson on Conant in Fleet Street, in 1777, for five guineas.

It was added to the list of New Testament manuscript by Scrivener (573) and Gregory (686).

The manuscript is currently housed at the British Library (Add MS 5468), in London.

== See also ==
- List of New Testament minuscules
- Biblical manuscript
- Textual criticism
