= Minuscule 536 =

- New Testament manuscript
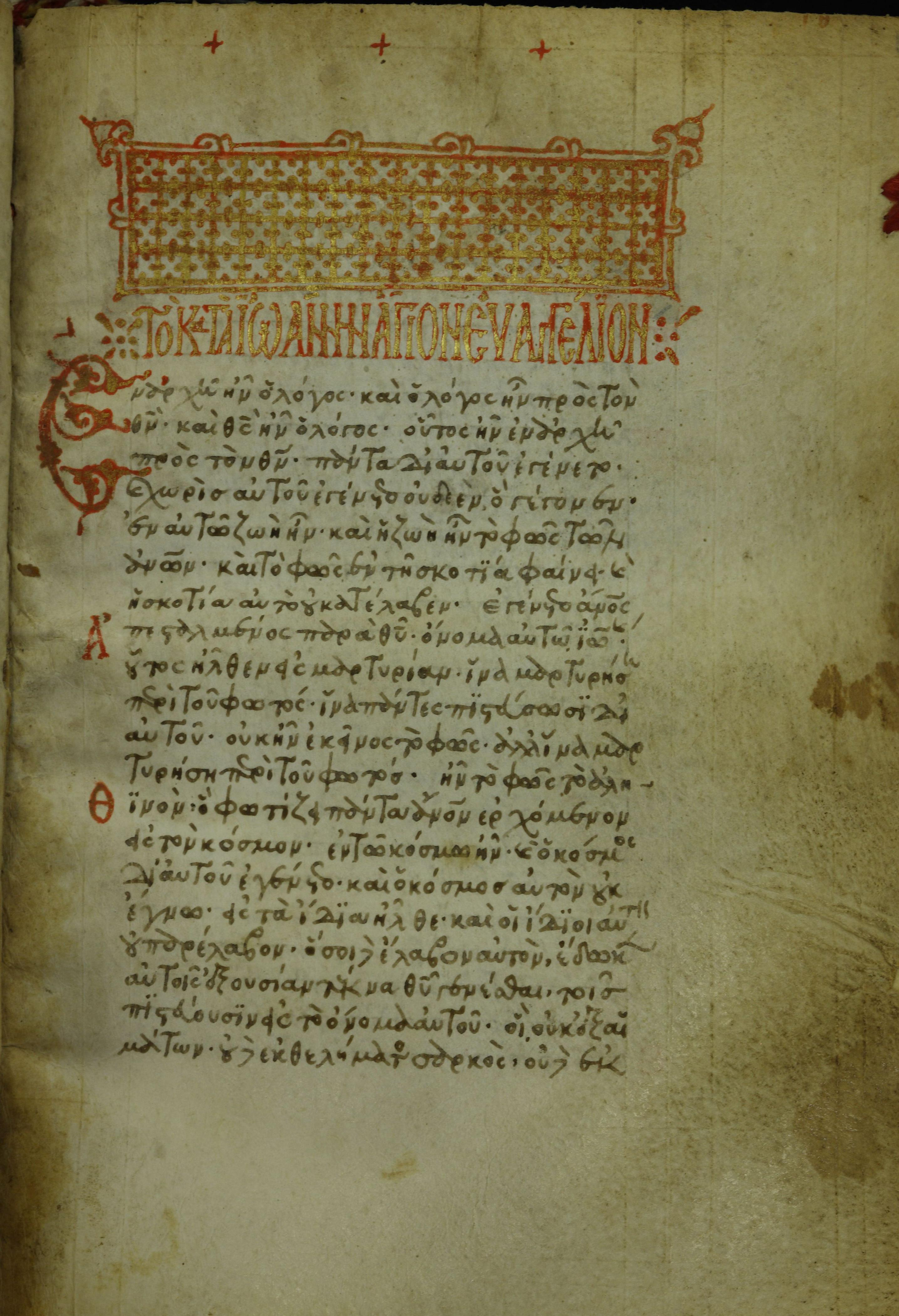
- Folio 115 recto with the beginning of John (decorated headpiece)
- Text: Gospels, Acts, Paul
- Date: 13th century
- Script: Greek
- Found: 1864, Janina
- Now at: University of Michigan
- Size: 13.2 cm by 9.2 cm
- Type: Byzantine text-type / eclectic / mixed
- Category: none
- Hand: minute hand

Minuscule 536 (in the Gregory-Aland numbering), δ 264 (in Soden's numbering), is a Greek minuscule manuscript of the New Testament, on parchment. Palaeographically it has been assigned to the 13th century. Scrivener labeled it by number 549. Several pages of the manuscript were lost. There are incomplete marginalia. The manuscript is available in a digital form on the internet.

== Description ==
It is "a very curious volume in ancient binding with two metal plates on the covers much resembling that of B-C. I. 7". The codex contains a complete text of the Gospels, Acts of the Apostles, and Pauline epistles on 174 parchment leaves (size 13.2 cm by 9.2 cm) with some additional material. It has only one lacuna (Acts 26:24-28:31). The lacking material was supplemented by another, but contemporary hand. The leaf after 63 is not numbered. The pages 127 recto and 127 verso are accompanied by horizontal lines in margin. The leaves 146-147 are written vertically.

The text is written one column per page, 26–31 lines per page, in a very minute hand. The large initial letters are decorated and in colours, the small initials are in red. It has decorated headpieces before each biblical book. The iota subscript is found twice only, and the error of itacism is quite rare. The writing being unusually full of abbreviations. The Old Testament quotations are marked by inverted comma (>).

It contains Prolegomena to the Acts of the Apostles, the tables of the κεφαλαια (tables of contents) are placed before Gospel of Matthew, Luke and John, numbers of the κεφαλαια (chapters) are given at the margin, with their τιτλοι (titles) at the head and foot of the pages. There is also a division according to the smaller Ammonian Sections, but there are no references to the Eusebian Canons. It contains subscriptions at the end of each book and numbers of στιχοι (only in Luke). References to the Eusebian Canons are noted only on one page of the codex. Lectionary markings and αναγνωσεις (lessons), are given only to Matthew, and they were added by a later hand. It has some scholia on Matthew 5 (folio 11 verso and folio 12 recto).

It contains seven pages with Gregory Nazianzen's heroic verses on the Lord's genealogy, and other [verses?] on His miracles and Parables, partly in red, precede tables of κεφαλαια to Matthew. Other verses of Gregory precede Mark and Luke, and follow John. There are no chapter divisions in the Acts, but a few capitals in red. Each book is preceded by decorated headpieces.

== Text ==
The Greek text of the Gospels has many of the Byzantine readings but its text is not entirely Byzantine. Hermann von Soden classified it as part of the textual family K^{r}, but it was not confirmed by Aland and Wisse. Aland did not place it in any category.

According to the Claremont Profile Method it has an eclectic text in Gospel of Luke. In Luke 1 it has mixed Byzantine text, in Luke 10 it represents textual cluster Family Π200, and in Luke 20 it belongs to the textual family K^{x}. In the Acts its text is very close to the textual family 1739.

According to Scrivener the variations from the text of majority are not numerous or remarkable.

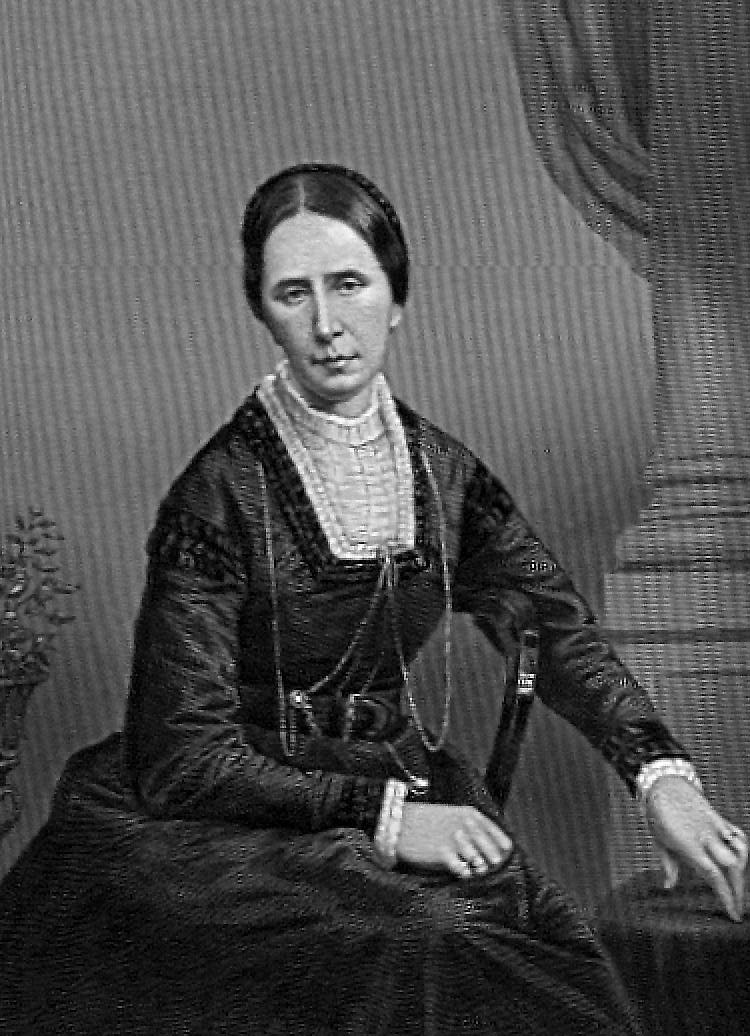
Angela Burdett-Coutts

== History ==
Of the history of the codex 536 nothing is known until the year 1864. In 1864, the manuscript was purchased from a dealer at Janina in Epirus, by Angela Burdett-Coutts (1814–1906), a philanthropist, together with other Greek manuscripts (among them codices 532–546). They were transported to England in 1870/71.

The manuscript was presented by Burdett-Coutts to Sir Roger Cholmely's School, and was housed at the Highgate (Burdett-Coutts II. 7), in London. It was examined and collated by Scrivener. In 1922 it was purchased for the library of the University of Michigan. The manuscript was described by K. W. Clark in 1937.

It was added to the list of the New Testament minuscule manuscripts by F. H. A. Scrivener (549) and C. R. Gregory (536). Gregory saw it in 1883.

It is currently housed at the University of Michigan (Ms. Inv. No. 24) in Ann Arbor.

== Gallery ==
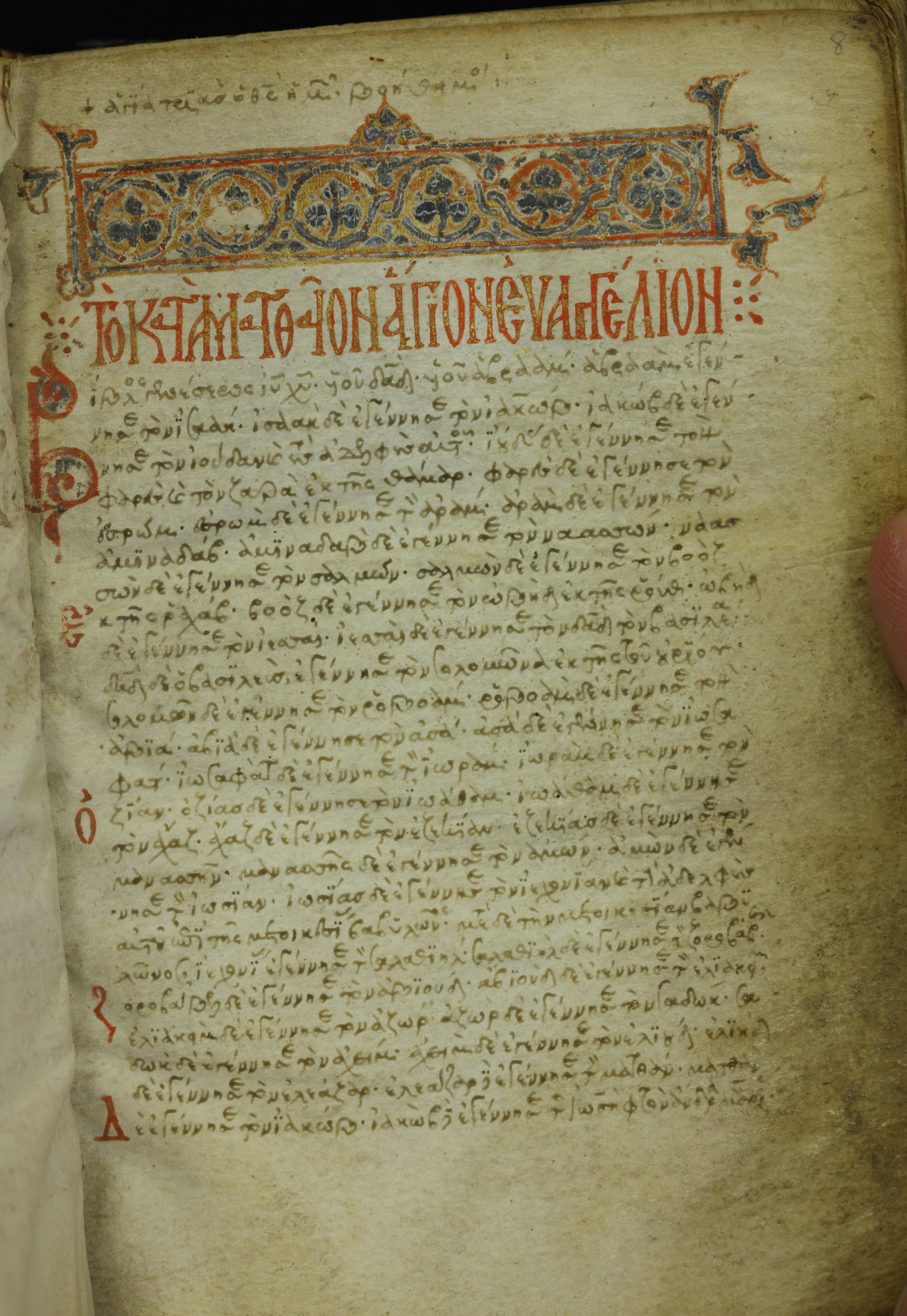
Folio 8 recto with the beginning of Matthew

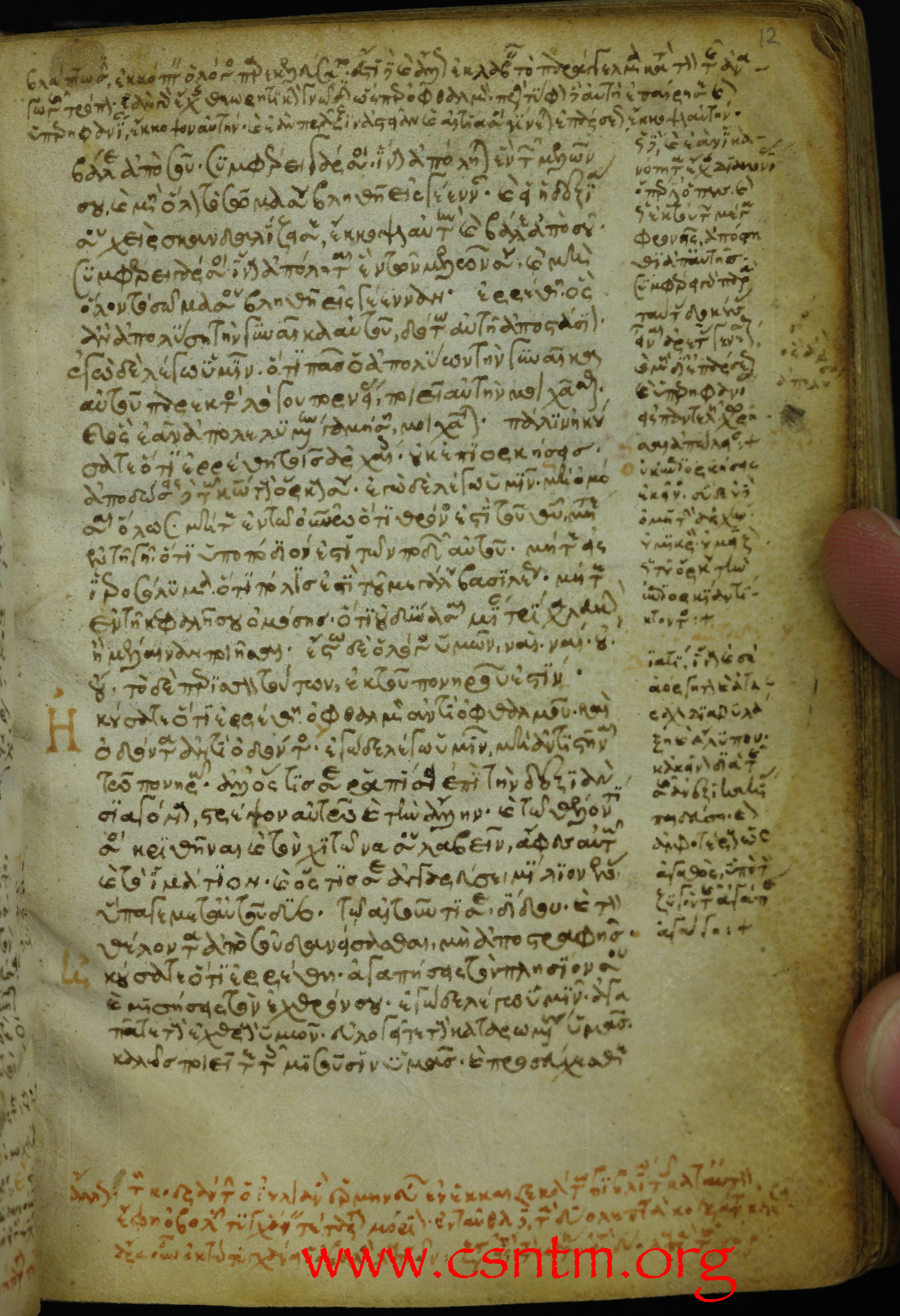
Folio 12 recto with a marginal commentary

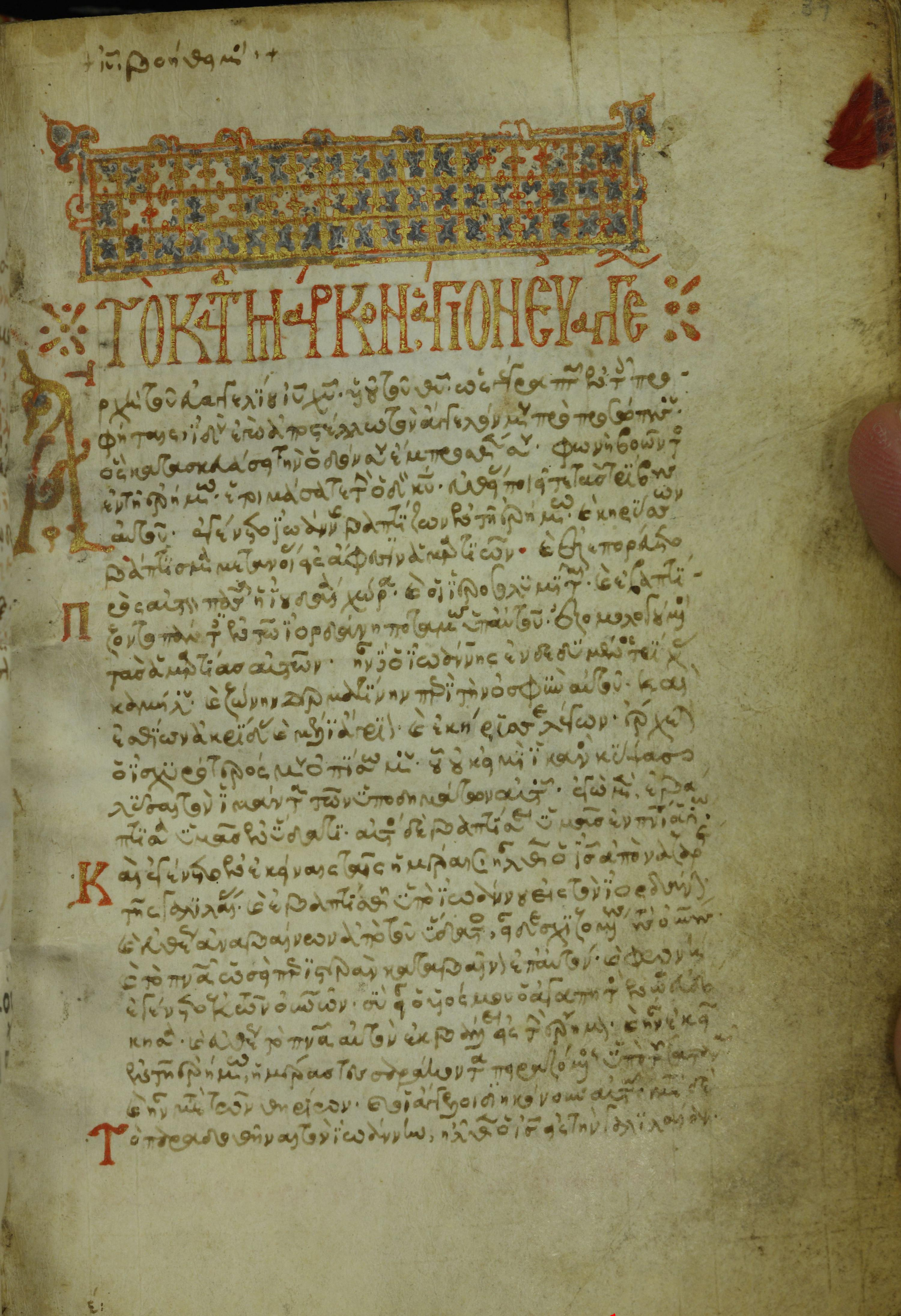
Folio 39 recto, the first page of Mark

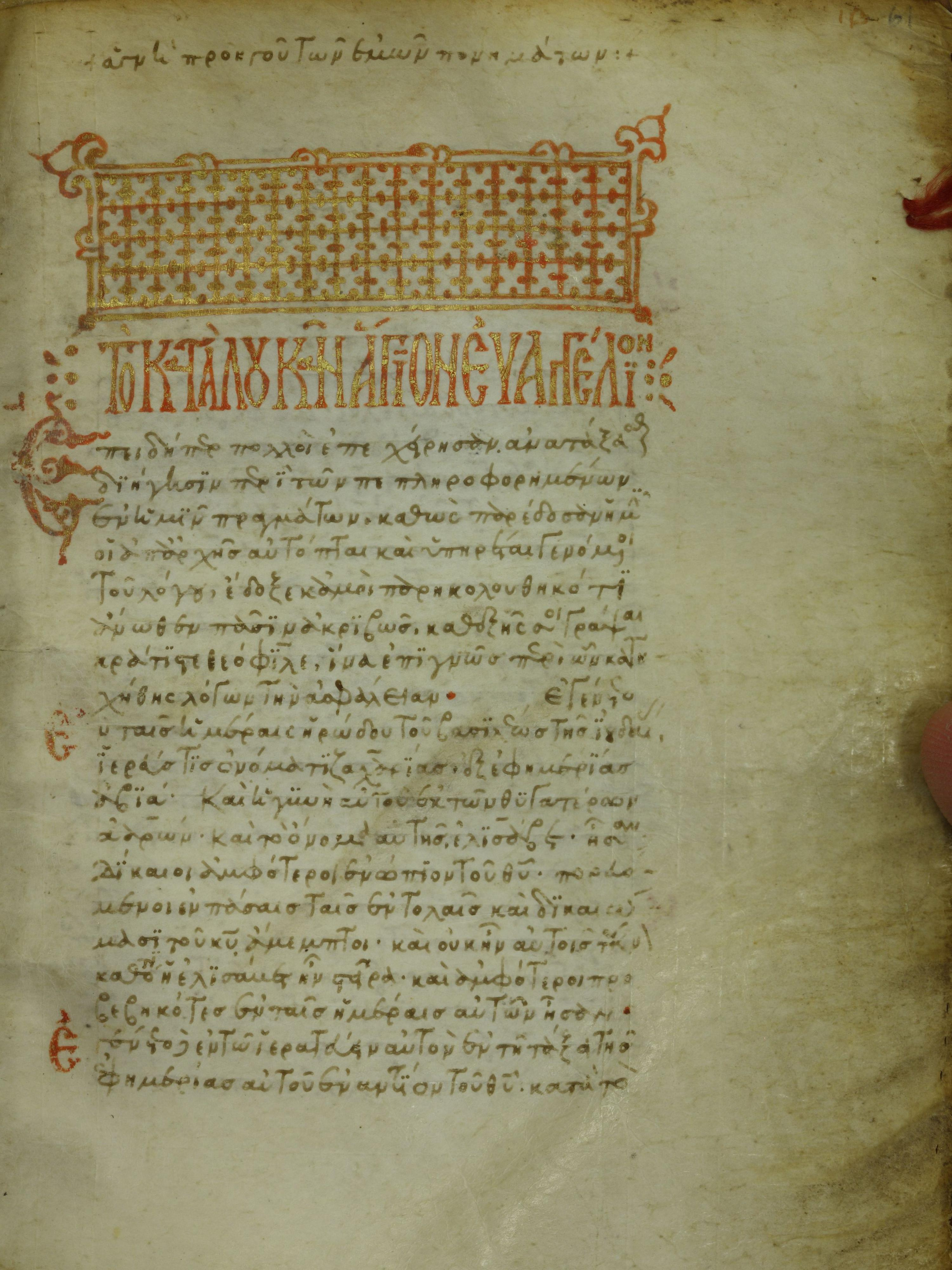
Folio 61 recto, the first page of Luke

== See also ==
- List of New Testament minuscules
- Biblical manuscript
- Textual criticism
