= Minuscule 129 =

- New Testament manuscript
- Text: Gospels
- Date: 12th century
- Script: Greek
- Now at: Vatican Library
- Size: 28.7 cm by 22.6 cm
- Type: Byzantine text-type
- Category: V
- Hand: neatly written
- Note: marginalia

Minuscule 129 (in the Gregory-Aland numbering), A^{200} (Soden), is a Greek minuscule manuscript of the New Testament, on parchment leaves. Palaeographically it has been assigned to the 12th century. The manuscript has complex contents. It has full marginalia.

== Description ==
The codex contains a complete text of the four Gospels on 355 parchment leaves (size 28.7 cm by 22.6 cm). The text is written in one column per page, 18 lines of biblical text and 44 lines of commentary text per page.

The text is divided according to the κεφαλαια (chapters), whose numbers are given at the margin, and the τιτλοι (titles) at the top of the pages. There is also a division according to the smaller Ammonian Sections (in Mark 233 – the last numbered section in 16:8), with references to the Eusebian Canons (written below Ammonian Section numbers).

It contains the Eusebian Canon tables, prolegomena, tables of the κεφαλαια (tables of contents) are placed before each Gospel, Synaxarion, Menologion, pictures, scholia at the margin, Victor's commentary on Mark, and note on John 7:53, as in 145 and others.

== Text ==
The Greek text of the codex is a representative of the Byzantine text-type. Aland placed it in Category V. According to the Claremont Profile Method it represents the textual family K^{x} in Luke 1; in Luke 10 and Luke 20 no profile was made.

The text of the Pericope Adulterae (John 8:3-11) is placed on the end of the fourth Gospel, on 355 folio.

== History ==
The manuscript was written by Eustathius. In 1438 it was bought in Constantinople by Nicholas de Cuza, Eastern Legate to the Council of Ferrara, along with minuscule 87. It was examined by Andreas Birch (about 1782). C. R. Gregory saw it in 1886.

It is currently housed at the Vatican Library (Vat. gr. 358), at Rome.

== See also ==
- List of New Testament minuscules
- Biblical manuscript
- Textual criticism
