= Minuscule 531 =

- New Testament manuscript
- Text: Gospel of Mark, Gospel of Luke
- Date: 12th century
- Script: Greek
- Now at: University of Birmingham
- Size: 20.3 cm by 15.5 cm
- Type: Byzantine text-type
- Category: V
- Note: incomplete marginalia

Minuscule 531 (in the Gregory-Aland numbering), ε 278 (in Soden's numbering), is a Greek minuscule manuscript of the New Testament, on a parchment. Palaeographically it has been assigned to the 12th century. It was adapted for liturgical use. Marginalia are incomplete. The manuscript is lacunose.

== Description ==
The codex contains the text of the Gospel of Mark and Gospel of Luke on 96 parchment leaves (size 20.3 cm by 15.5 cm) with a large lacuna at the end of Luke (Luke 17:36-fin.). The text is written in one column per page, 21 lines per page.

The text is divided according to the Ammonian Sections, whose numbers are given at the margin, with references to the Eusebian Canons. There is also a lectionary markings at the margin (for liturgical use).

== Text ==
The Greek text of the codex is a representative of the Byzantine text-type. Hermann von Soden included it to the textual family K^{x}. Aland placed it in Category V. According to the Claremont Profile Method it belongs to the textual family K^{x} in Luke 1 and Luke 10. In Luke 20 no profile was made because of defect of the codex.

== History ==
The manuscript was bought in Athens in 1884 along with the codex 573. It was examined by William Charles Braithwaite. C. R. Gregory did not see it.

The manuscript is currently housed in the Cadbury Research Library, University of Birmingham (Braithwaite Greek MS 1).

== See also ==
- List of New Testament minuscules
- Biblical manuscript
- Textual criticism
