= Minuscule 178 =

- New Testament manuscript
- Name: Angelicus gr. 123
- Text: Gospels
- Date: 12th century
- Script: Greek
- Now at: Biblioteca Angelica
- Size: 37.9 cm by 29.7 cm
- Type: Byzantine/mixed
- Category: none
- Note: marginalia

Minuscule 178 (in the Gregory-Aland numbering), ε 210 (Soden), is a Greek minuscule manuscript of the New Testament, on parchment. Palaeographically it has been assigned to the 12th century. It has marginalia.

== Description ==
The codex contains an almost complete text of the four Gospels on 272 thick parchment leaves (size 37.9 cm by 29.7 cm), with only one small lacuna (John 21:17-25). The leaves are arranged in quarto. The text is written in two columns per page, in 23 lines per page, in dark-brown ink, capital letters in gold.

The text is divided according to the κεφαλαια (chapters), whose numbers are given at the margin, and their τιτλοι (titles of chapters) with a harmony at the top of the pages. There is also a division according to the Ammonian Sections (in Mark 234 sections - the last in 16:9), but without references to the Eusebian Canons.

It contains the Eusebian Canon tables at the beginning, lists of the κεφαλαια (lists of contents) before each of the Gospels.

The headings of the Gospels as in minuscule 69 – εκ του κατα Μαρκον. (Note: In this way also are titled the headings of the Gospels in minuscule 543 and 668.)

On the first leaf it has the same subscription as codex 87.

== Text ==
Kurt Aland did not place the Greek text of the codex in any Category.

According to the Claremont Profile Method it represents the textual family Π^{a} in Luke 1 and Luke 10. In Luke 20 it represents K^{x}.

The text of the Pericope Adulterae (John 7:53-8:11) is marked by an obelus.

== History ==
Formerly the manuscript was held in της μονης του προδρομου της κοιμενης εγγιστα της Αετιου αρχαικη δε τη μονη κησις πετρα in Constantinople, as codices 87 and 774.

The manuscript came from Constantinople. According to the subscription "prope Cisternam Aeti".

It was examined by Bianchini, Birch (about 1782), and Scholz. C. R. Gregory saw it in 1886.

It is currently housed at the Biblioteca Angelica (gr. 123), at Rome.

== See also ==
- List of New Testament minuscules
- Biblical manuscript
- Textual criticism
