= Minuscule 775 =

- New Testament manuscript
- Text: Gospels
- Date: 13th century
- Script: Greek
- Now at: National Library of Greece
- Size: 12.5 cm by 9.5 cm
- Type: Byzantine text-type
- Category: V
- Note: –

Minuscule 775 (in the Gregory-Aland numbering), ε461 (von Soden), is a Greek minuscule manuscript of the New Testament written on parchment. Palaeographically it has been assigned to the 13th century. The manuscript has complex contents.

== Description ==
The codex contains the text of the four Gospels, on 223 parchment leaves (size 12.5 cm by 9.5 cm). The text is written in one column per page, 24 lines per page.

The text is divided according to the κεφαλαια (chapters), whose numbers are given at the margin, with their τιτλοι (titles) at the top of the pages. There is also another division according to the smaller Ammonian Sections (in Mark 240 sections, the last in 16:9), with a references to the Eusebian Canons.

It contains Prolegomena, Argumentum (explanation of using the Eusebian Canons), tables of the κεφαλαια (tables of contents) before each Gospel, lectionary markings at the margin, Synaxarion (liturgical book), and subscriptions at the end of each Gospel.

== Text ==
The Greek text of the codex is a representative of the Byzantine text-type. Hermann von Soden classified it to the textual family I^{κ}. Aland placed it in Category V.

According to the Claremont Profile Method it represent the textual family K^{x} in Luke 1 and Luke 20. In Luke 10 no profile was made.

== History ==
C. R. Gregory dated the manuscript to the 13th century. The manuscript is currently dated by the INTF to the 13th century.

The manuscript was noticed in a catalogue from 1876.

It was added to the list of New Testament manuscripts by Gregory (775). Gregory saw the manuscript in 1886.

The manuscript is now housed at the National Library of Greece (58) in Athens.

== See also ==
- List of New Testament minuscules
- Biblical manuscript
- Textual criticism
- Minuscule 774
