= Minuscule 558 =

- New Testament manuscript
- Text: Gospels
- Date: 13th century
- Script: Greek
- Now at: Bodleian Library
- Size: 21.5 cm by 16.6 cm
- Type: Byzantine text-type
- Category: V

Minuscule 558 (in the Gregory-Aland numbering), ε 275 (in the Soden numbering), is a Greek minuscule manuscript of the New Testament, on a parchment. Palaeographically it has been assigned to the 13th century. Scrivener labelled it by number 525.

== Description ==
The codex contains a complete text of the four Gospels on 352 parchment leaves (size 21.5 cm by 16.6 cm). The writing is in one column per page, 20 lines per page. The tables of the κεφαλαια are placed before every Gospel, numerals of the κεφαλαια (chapters) are placed at the margin, with their τιτλοι (titles) at the top. There is another division according to the Ammonian Sections (in Mark 231 Sections - the last in 16:9), but without a references to the Eusebian Canons.

It contains lectionary markings, incipits (notes on the beginning) in vermilion, αναγνωσεις (liturgical notes), subscriptions, numbered στιχοι, and pictures.

== Text ==
The Greek text of the codex is a representative of the Byzantine text-type. Hermann von Soden classified it to A^{k}, related to the Antiocheian commentated text (along with 534, 546, 573, 715). Aland placed it in Category V. According to the Claremont Profile Method it represents the textual family K^{r} in Luke 1 and Luke 10. In Luke 20 it belongs to the group 1519, which stays closely to the family K^{x}.

== History ==
The manuscript was in the possession of Earl of Leicester at Holkham Hall until it was transferred to the Bodleian Library in 1981, by arrangement with H. M. Treasury and the executors of the 5th Earl of Leicester. It was added to the list of New Testament manuscripts by Scrivener and was examined by Dean Burgon.

The manuscripts was added to the list of the New Testament minuscule manuscripts by F. H. A. Scrivener (525) and C. R. Gregory (558).

The manuscript is now housed at the Bodleian Library (Holkham Gr. 115) in Oxford.

== See also ==
- List of New Testament minuscules
- Biblical manuscript
- Textual criticism
