= Minuscule 761 =

- New Testament manuscript
- Text: Gospels
- Date: 14th century
- Script: Greek
- Now at: National Library of Greece
- Size: 20 cm by 14.5 cm
- Type: Byzantine text-type
- Category: V
- Note: —

Minuscule 761 is a Greek minuscule manuscript of the New Testament, written on parchment. It is designated by the siglum 761 in the Gregory-Aland numbering of New Testament manuscripts, and as ε476 in the von Soden numbering of New Testament manuscripts. Using the study of comparative writing styles (palaeography), it has been assigned to the 14th century. Biblical scholar Frederick H. A. Scrivener labelled it as 850^{e}.

== Description ==
The manuscript is a codex (precursor to the modern book format) containing the text of the four Gospels on 281 parchment leaves (sized 20 cm by 14.5 cm). The text is written in one column per page, 22 lines per page.

The text is divided according to the chapters (known as κεφαλαια / kephalaia), whose numbers are given in the margin, and their titles (known as τιτλοι / titloi) written at the top of the pages. There is also a division into the smaller Ammonian sections with references to the Eusebian Canons (both early systems of dividing the four Gospels into different sections), of which in the Gospel of Mark there are 233 sections, the last appearing at Mark 16:8. The manuscript is also ornamented.

It contains the lectionary books Synaxarion (a list of saint's days) and Menologion (a list of readings to be read each calendar month), Eusebius' Epistle to Carpian (a letter outlying Eusebius' Gospel division system), the Eusebian Canon tables, Prolegomena to each gospel, lectionary markings in the margin, subscriptions at the end of each gospel, tables of contents (also known as κεφαλαια) before each Gospel, and pictures.

== Text ==
The Greek text of the codex is considered to be a representative of the Byzantine text-type. The text-types are groups of different New Testament manuscripts which share specific or generally related readings, which then differ from each other group, and thus the conflicting readings can separate out the groups. These are then used to determine the original text as published; there are three main groups with names: Alexandrian, Western, and Byzantine. Textual-critic Hermann von Soden classified it to his Antiocheian commentated text (K^{a}), meaning it is a Byzantine commentated text. Biblical scholar Kurt Aland placed it in Category V of his New Testament manuscripts classification system. Category V manuscripts are described as "manuscripts with a purely or predominantly Byzantine text."

According to the Claremont Profile Method (a specific analysis of textual data) it represents textual family K^{x} in Luke 1 and Luke 20. In Luke 10 no profile was made. It belongs to the textual cluster 46, and creates a pair with Minuscule 995 in Luke 1 and Luke 10.

== History ==
The earliest history of the manuscript is unknown. It was added to the list of New Testament manuscripts by Scrivener (as his 850) and Gregory to his list as number 761. Gregory saw the manuscript in 1886. It was presented to the museum in Aegina.

Scrivener dated the manuscript to the 14th century; but Gregory dated the manuscript to the 15th century. The manuscript is currently dated by the INTF to the 14th century. The manuscript is presently housed at the National Library of Greece (shelf number 154) in Athens.

== See also ==
- Minuscule 762
- Minuscule 760
- List of New Testament minuscules
- Biblical manuscript
- Textual criticism
