= Minuscule 764 =

- New Testament manuscript
- Text: Gospels †
- Date: 14th century
- Script: Greek
- Now at: National Library of Greece
- Size: 28 cm by 19.5 cm
- Type: Byzantine text-type
- Category: V
- Note: —

Minuscule 764 (in the Gregory-Aland numbering), ε1231 (von Soden), is a Greek minuscule manuscript of the New Testament written on parchment. Palaeographically it has been assigned to the 14th century. The manuscript has no complex contents. Scrivener labelled it as 855^{e}.

== Description ==
The codex contains the text of the four Gospels, on 332 parchment leaves (size 28 cm by 19.5 cm), with some lacunae. The text is written in one column per page, 20-22 lines per page. It lacks texts of Matthew 6:7-7:15; 6:25-9:9; John 21:3-25 were supplied by a later hand on paper.

The text is divided according to the κεφαλαια (chapters), whose numbers are given at the margin, with their τιτλοι (titles) at the top of the pages.

It contains tables of the κεφαλαια (tables o contents), lectionary markings at the margin, αναγνωσεις (lessons), and subscriptions at the end of each Gospel.

== Text ==
The Greek text of the codex is a representative of the Byzantine text-type. Hermann von Soden classified it to the textual family K^{x}. Aland placed it in Category V.

According to the Claremont Profile Method it represents textual family K^{x} in Luke 1 and Luke 20. In Luke 10 no profile was made.

== History ==
Scrivener dated the manuscript to the 12th century; Gregory dated the manuscript to the 14th century. The manuscript is currently dated by the INTF to the 14th century.

In 1598 the manuscript to the monastery Vatopedi at Athos, by Ban Gregorius Kritsiun.

It was added to the list of New Testament manuscripts by Scrivener (855) and Gregory (764). Gregory saw the manuscript in 1886.

The manuscript is now housed at the National Library of Greece (157) in Athens.

== See also ==
- List of New Testament minuscules
- Biblical manuscript
- Textual criticism
- Minuscule 763 (Gregory-Aland)
