= Minuscule 573 =

Religious documentary

- New Testament manuscript
- Text: Gospels †
- Date: 13th century
- Script: Greek
- Now at: University of Birmingham
- Size: 11.5 cm by 7.6 cm
- Type: Byzantine
- Category: V

Minuscule 573 (in the Gregory-Aland numbering of New Testament manuscripts), ε 447 (in the von Soden numbering of New Testament manuscripts), is a Greek minuscule manuscript of the New Testament, on parchment. Using the study of comparative writing styles (palaeography), it has been assigned to the 13th century CE. The manuscript has complex contents.

== Description ==
The manuscript is a codex (precursor to the modern book) containing the text of the four Gospels on 189 parchment leaves (size 11.5 cm by 7.6 cm). The writing is in one column per page, 29 lines per page.

== Text ==
The Greek text of the codex is considered a representative of the Byzantine text-type. Biblical scholar Hermann von Soden classified it to his group A^{k}, related to the Antiocheian commentated text (along with Minuscule 534, Minuscule 546, Minuscule 558, and Minuscule 715). Biblical scholar Kurt Aland placed it in Category V of his New Testament manuscript classification system.

According to the Claremont Profile Method it represents K^{x} in Luke 1 and Luke 20. In Luke 10 no profile was made.

== History ==
The manuscript was written in time of Andronikos II Palaiologos (1272–1332).

It was bought from Athens in 1884 along with the codex 531. It was examined and described by William Charles Braithwaite.

The manuscript is currently housed in the Cadbury Research Library, University of Birmingham (Braithwaite Greek MS 2).

== See also ==
- List of New Testament minuscules
- Biblical manuscript
- Textual criticism
