= Minuscule 754 =

Greek minuscule manuscript of the New Testament

- New Testament manuscript
- Text: Gospels
- Date: 11th century
- Script: Greek
- Now at: Bibliothèque nationale de France
- Size: 30.7 cm by 23 cm
- Type: Byzantine text-type
- Category: V
- Note: —

Minuscule 754 (in the Gregory-Aland numbering), A^{142} (von Soden), is a Greek minuscule manuscript of the New Testament written on parchment. Palaeographically it has been assigned to the 11th century. The manuscript has no complex contents. Scrivener labelled it as 763^{e}.

== Description ==
The codex contains the text of the four Gospels, on 464 parchment leaves (size 30.7 cm by 23 cm), with some lacunae (Matthew 6:25-8:19; John 21:18-25). The texts of Matthew 6:25-8:19; John 21:18-25 were supplied by a later hand on paper.

The biblical text is surrounded by a catena.

The text is divided according to the Ammonian Sections, with a references to the Eusebian Canons.

It contains Epistula ad Carpianum, lectionary markings at the margin, and a commentary. The manuscript is ornamented.

== Text ==
The Greek text of the codex is a representative of the Byzantine text-type. Aland placed it in Category V.

It was not examined by using the Claremont Profile Method.

In John 2:22 it reads ελεγε αυτοις along with Codex Cyprius, Codex Petropolitanus, 1212, lectionary 1076; majority reads ελεγε;

== History ==
Scrivener and Gregory dated the manuscript to the 11th century. The manuscript is currently dated by the INTF to the 11th century.

The manuscript was brought from Janina.

It was added to the list of New Testament manuscripts by Scrivener (763) and Gregory (754).

The manuscript is now housed at the Bibliothèque nationale de France (Suppl. Gr. 1076) in Paris.

== See also ==
- List of New Testament minuscules
- Biblical manuscript
- Textual criticism
- Minuscule 753
