= Minuscule 534 =

- New Testament manuscript
- Text: Gospels †
- Date: 13th century
- Script: Greek
- Now at: University of Michigan
- Size: 14 cm by 10.2 cm
- Type: Byzantine text-type
- Category: V
- Note: incomplete marginalia

Minuscule 534 (in the Gregory-Aland numbering), 547 (Scrivener's numbering), ε 333 (in Soden's numbering), is a Greek minuscule manuscript of the New Testament, on a paper. Palaeographically it has been assigned to the 13th century. The manuscript was adapted for liturgical use. It is lacunose.

== Description ==
The codex contains an incomplete text of the four Gospels on 270 paper leaves (size 14 cm by 10.2 cm) with some lacunae (Luke 1:25-42; 20:37-21:24). It is written in one column per page, 22 lines per page.

The text is divided according to the κεφαλαια (chapters), whose numerals are given at the margin, and their τιτλοι (titles of chapters) at the top and foot. There is no division according to the Ammonian Sections or Eusebian Canons.

The tables of the κεφαλαια (tables of contents) are placed before each Gospel. It contains a lectionary markings at the margin, incipits, αναγνωσεως (lessons), Synaxarion, Menologion, subscriptions at the end of each Gospel, and pictures.

It has on the cover "a curious metal tablet adorned with figures and superscriptions" (as codex 536).

== Text ==
The Greek text of the codex is a representative of the Byzantine text-type. Hermann von Soden classified it to A^{k}, related to the Antiocheian commentated text (along with 546, 558, 573, 715). Aland placed it in Category V. According to the Claremont Profile Method it represents textual family K^{x} in Luke 1, Luke 10, and Luke 20 (fragmentary in Luke 1 and 20).

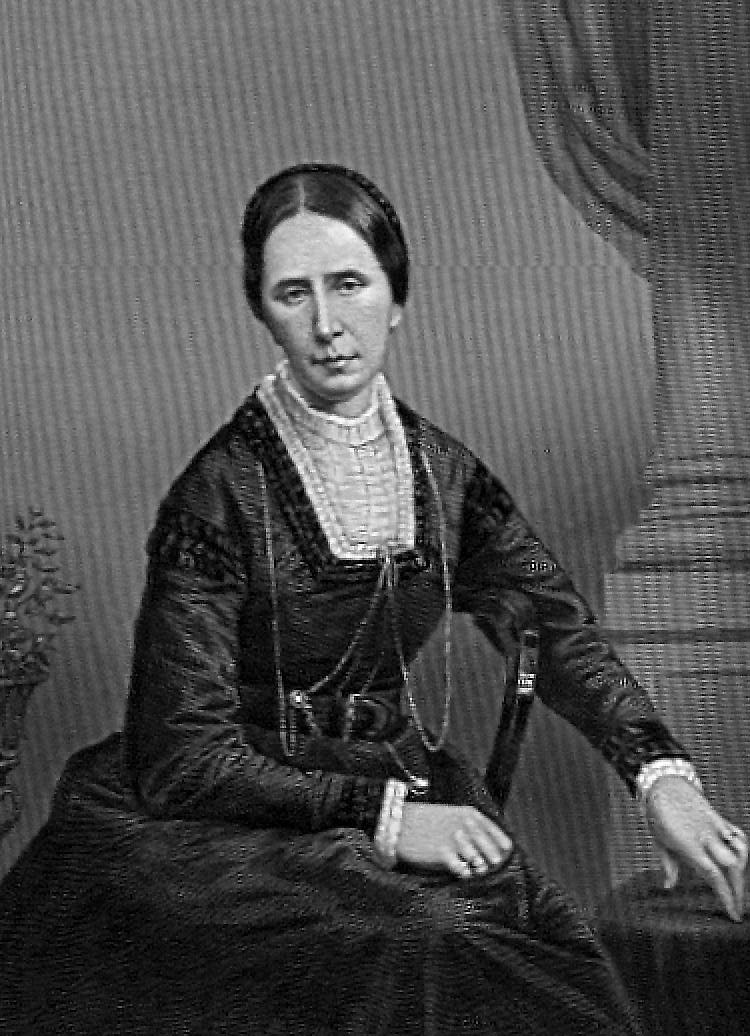
The Lady Burdett-Coutts

== History ==
The manuscript is dated by the INTF on the palaeographical ground to the 13th century.

The manuscript was written by Marcus in the 13th century. In 1864 it was purchased from a dealer at Janina in Epeiros, by Baroness Burdett-Coutts (1814-1906), a philanthropist, together with other Greek manuscripts (among them codices 532-546). They were transported to England in 1870-1871. All collection was presented by Burdett-Coutts to Sir Roger Cholmely's School.

The manuscript was added to the list of the New Testament minuscule manuscripts by F. H. A. Scrivener (547) and C. R. Gregory (534). Gregory saw it in 1883.

The manuscript was housed at the Highgate (Burdett-Coutts 1. 7), in London. It was examined and collated by Scrivener.

It is currently housed at the University of Michigan (Ms. 26) in Ann Arbor.

== See also ==
- List of New Testament minuscules
- Biblical manuscript
- Textual criticism
