= Minuscule 87 =

- New Testament manuscript
- Name: Codex Trevirensis
- Text: Gospel of John
- Date: 11th century
- Script: Greek
- Now at: Cusanusstift
- Size: 36.5 cm by 25.7 cm
- Type: ?
- Category: none

Minuscule 87 is a Greek minuscule manuscript of the New Testament, made of parchment. It is designated by the siglum 87 in the Gregory-Aland numbering of New Testament manuscripts, and C^{L22} in the von Soden numbering of New Testament manuscripts. Using the study of comparative writing styles (palaeography), it has been assigned to the 11th century. It was formerly dated to the 12th century by Biblical scholars Frederick H. A. Scrivener, and Caspar René Gregory.

== Description ==
The manuscript is a codex (precursor to the modern book format), containing the text of the Gospel of John, with a surrounding catena (biblical commentary taken from early church apologists and teachers), on 231 parchment leaves (sized 36.5 cm by 25.7 cm). There are some missing sections, with the current list of verses as follows: John 1:1-27, 1:29-49, 1:51-4:18, 4:21-7:52, 8:12-19:40, John 20:1-21:25. The text is written in one column, 39 lines per page. The main text of John and surrounding catena are written in minuscule script.

The gospel title is small, and written in gold ink. Due to the extensive commentary on the verse, John 1:1 is repeated several times in the first 10 pages of the manuscript. The church fathers identified within the catena are: John Chrysosteom, Cyril of Alexandria, Theodore of Mopsuestia, Basil of Caesarea.

== Text ==
Biblical scholar Kurt Aland did not place the Greek text of the codex in any Category of his New Testament manuscript classification system. The text of the Pericope Adulterae (John 7:53-8:11) is omitted.

== History ==
The manuscript was formerly held in the Monastery of Prodromos in Constantinople, as per a note on the reverse side of leaf 4:

Greek Text	English Translation
Ἡ βίβλος αὕτη, τῆς μονῆς τοῦ Προδρόμου	This book [is from] the Prodromos Monastery,
Τῆς Κειμένης ἔγγϊστα τῆς ἀετίου	of Keimeni near Aetis,
Ἀρχαϊκῆ δὲ τῆ μονῆ κλῆσις Πέτρα	the Ancient Monastery of Klesis Petra

This is also seen in minuscules 178 and 774.

The manuscript once belonged to the famous scholar, philosopher and mathematician, Cardinal Nicholas of Cusa, together with the manuscript 129. It came from Constantinople; it was housed at Trier. It was examined by Balthasar Cordier, and biblical scholar Johann M. A. Scholz.

It was added to the list of the New Testament manuscripts by Scholz. Textual critic Johann J. Wettstein's 87 is minuscule 250, and not minuscule 87. Biblical scholar Caspar René Gregory tried to find this manuscript twice in 1884 in Trier and Cusa, but was unsuccessful.

It is currently dated by the INTF to the 11th century. It is presently housed in at the Cusanusstift (Bd. 18), in Bernkastel-Kues. In 2026, the Center for the Study of New Testament Manuscripts published online colour images of the manuscript.

== See also ==
- Minuscule 88
- Minuscule 86
- List of New Testament minuscules
- Biblical manuscript
- Textual criticism
