= Minuscule 709 =

- New Testament manuscript
- Text: Gospels †
- Date: 11th century
- Script: Greek
- Now at: Bodleian Library
- Size: 19 cm by 15.5 cm
- Type: Byzantine text-type
- Category: none

Minuscule 709 (in the Gregory-Aland numbering), ε154 (von Soden), is a Greek minuscule manuscript of the New Testament, on parchment. Palaeographically it has been assigned to the 11th century. The manuscript is lacunose. Scrivener labelled it as 737^{e}.

== Description ==
The codex contains the text of the four Gospels on 140 parchment leaves (size 19 cm by 15 cm), with some lacunae in text (Matthew 1:1-20; Luke 15:5-24:53; John 1:1-9:11; 13:3-15:10; 16:21-20:25). The texts of Luke 3:25-4:11; 6:25-42 were supplied by a later hand.

The leaf 133 is a palimpsest with the older text of Luke 6:25-42 (Minuscule 2601), overwriting not much earlier than itself.

The text is written in two columns per page, 30 lines per page. The ornamental headpieces and decorated initials.

The lists of the κεφαλαια (lists of contents) are placed before each Gospel.

The text is divided according to the κεφαλαια (chapters), which numbers are given the left margin, and their τιτλοι (titles) at the top (with the harmony); there is also a division according to the Ammonian Sections (in Mark 237, the last section in 16:15), with references to the Eusebian Canons, and with the harmony in the bottom margin. It contains lectionary markings, incipits, subscriptions, ρηματα, and numbered στιχοι.

== Text ==
The Greek text of the codex is a representative of the Byzantine text-type. Kurt Aland did not place it in any Category.

According to the Claremont Profile Method it represents textual group Λ in Luke 1 and Luke 10. In Luke 20 the text of the manuscript is defective.

== History ==
Scrivener and Gregory dated the manuscript to the 11th century. Currently the manuscript is dated by the INTF to the 11th century.

It was probably written in South Italy. It was also suggested that the scribe was Armenian (F. Madan). It was bought in Rhodes, in 1882.

It was added to the list of New Testament manuscripts by Scrivener (737) and Gregory (709). Gregory saw the manuscript in 1883.

At present the manuscript is housed at the Bodleian Library (MS. Auct. T. inf. 1. 4) in Oxford.

== See also ==
- List of New Testament minuscules
- Biblical manuscript
- Textual criticism
