= Minuscule 729 =

- New Testament manuscript
- Text: Gospels
- Date: 13th century
- Script: Greek
- Now at: Bibliothèque nationale de France
- Size: 29.6 cm by 21.5 cm
- Type: Byzantine text-type
- Category: V
- Note: –

Minuscule 729 (in the Gregory-Aland numbering), Θ^{ε323} (von Soden), is a Greek minuscule manuscript of the New Testament written on parchment. Palaeographically it has been assigned to the 13th century. The manuscript has complex contents. Scrivener labelled it as 747^{e}.

== Description ==
The codex contains a complete text of the four Gospels on 341 parchment leaves (size 29.6 cm by 21.5 cm).

The text is written in two columns per page, 37-47 lines per page.

The text is divided according to the κεφαλαια (chapters), with their τιτλοι (titles of chapters) at the top of the pages. There is no another division according to the smaller Ammonian Sections (with references to the Eusebian Canons). It contains Prolegomena and tables of the κεφαλαια (tables of contents) before each Gospel. It has a commentary of Theophylact.

Folio 342 is classified as Lectionary 61.

== Text ==
The Greek text of the codex is a representative of the Byzantine text-type. Aland placed it in Category V.

It was not examined by using the Claremont Profile Method.

== History ==
Scrivener dated the manuscript to the 13th century, Gregory dated it to the 13th or 14th century. The manuscript is currently dated by the INTF to the 13th century.

It was added to the list of New Testament manuscripts by Scrivener (747) and Gregory (729). It was examined and described by Paulin Martin. Gregory saw the manuscript in 1885.

The manuscript is now housed at the Bibliothèque nationale de France (Gr. 182, fol. 1-341) in Paris.

== See also ==
- List of New Testament minuscules
- Biblical manuscript
- Textual criticism
