= Minuscule 772 =

- New Testament manuscript
- Text: Gospels †
- Date: 14th century
- Script: Greek
- Now at: National Library of Greece
- Size: 24 cm by 19.5 cm
- Type: ?
- Category: none
- Note: commentary

Minuscule 772 (in the Gregory-Aland numbering), Θ^{ε418} (von Soden), is a Greek minuscule manuscript of the New Testament written on parchment. Palaeographically it has been assigned to the 14th century. The manuscript has no complex contents. Scrivener labelled it as 867^{e}.

== Description ==
The codex contains the text of the four Gospels, on 387 parchment leaves (size 24 cm by 19.5 cm), with some lacunae. The texts of Matthew 1:1-6:18 and John 21:24.25 were supplied by a later hand from the 16th century on paper. The text is written in one column per page, 28-31 lines per page.

The text is divided according to the κεφαλαια (chapters), whose numbers are given at the margin, with their τιτλοι (titles) at the top of the pages.

Lectionary markings were added by a later hand. It contains a commentary of Theophylact.

== Text ==
Kurt Aland did not place the Greek text of the codex in any Category. It was not examined by the Claremont Profile Method.

The lacks the Pericope Adulterae (John 7:53-8:11).

== History ==
F. H. A. Scrivener dated the manuscript to the 15th century; Gregory dated the manuscript to the 12th century. The manuscript is currently dated by the INTF to the 14th century.

The manuscript was noticed in a catalogue from 1876.

It was added to the list of New Testament manuscripts by Scrivener (867) and Gregory (772). Gregory saw the manuscript in 1886.

The manuscript is now housed at the National Library of Greece (489) in Athens.

== See also ==
- List of New Testament minuscules
- Biblical manuscript
- Textual criticism
- Minuscule 771
