= Minuscule 701 =

- New Testament manuscript
- Text: Gospels
- Date: 14th century
- Script: Greek
- Now at: Unknown
- Size: 19 cm by 16 cm
- Type: ?
- Category: none

Minuscule 701 is a Greek minuscule manuscript of the New Testament, written on parchment. It is designated by the siglum 701 in the Gregory-Aland numbering of New Testament manuscripts, and ε1405 in the von Soden numbering of New Testament manuscripts. Using the study of comparative writing styles (palaeography), it has been assigned to the 14th century. The manuscript has complex contents. Biblical scholar Frederick H. A. Scrivener labelled it by 523^{e}.

== Description ==
The manuscript is a codex (precursor to the modern book format) containing the text of the New Testament on 170 parchment leaves (size 19 cm by 16 cm) The text is written in one column per page, 22 lines per page. The text of Matthew 23:1-20 was supplied by a later hand.

The text is divided according to the chapters (known as κεφαλαια / kephalaia), whose numbers are given in the margin, with their titles (known as τιτλοι / titloi) given at the top and bottom of the pages. There is also a division according to the Ammonian Sections, with references to the Eusebian Canons (both early systems of dividing the gospels into referenceable sections).

It contains Prolegomena, the tables of conetns (also known as κεφαλαια) before each Gospel, lectionary markings in the margin, incipits, Synaxarion, Menologion, and "barbarous pictures".

== Text ==
Biblical scholar Kurt Aland did not place the Greek text of the codex in any Category of his New Testament classification system. It was not examined by using the Claremont Profile Method.

== History ==
The manuscript once belonged to the Metropolitan Church in Heraclea near Propontis. Thomas Payne, chaplain in the British embassy in Constantinople, presented the manuscript to Charles Herzog, Duke of Marlborough, in 1738. It was held in Belsheim 3.B.14, and in the family of White in London. Gregory saw it in 1883. It was added to the list of New Testament manuscript by Scrivener (523) and Gregory (701).

It was examined and described by Dean Burgon. Biblical scholar Frederick H. A. Scrivener dated the manuscript to the 13th century, however Biblical scholar Caspar René Gregory dated the manuscript to the 14th century. The manuscript is currently dated by the INTF to the 14th century. Both the owner of the manuscript and its location are presently unknown.

== See also ==
- List of New Testament minuscules
- Biblical manuscript
- Textual criticism
