= Minuscule 760 =

- New Testament manuscript
- Text: Gospels
- Date: 12th century
- Script: Greek
- Now at: National Library of Greece
- Size: 21 cm by 15 cm
- Type: Byzantine text-type
- Category: V
- Note: —

Minuscule 760 (in the Gregory-Aland numbering), ε475 (von Soden), is a Greek minuscule manuscript of the New Testament written on parchment. Palaeographically it has been assigned to the 12th century. Scrivener labelled it as 849^{e}.

== Description ==
The codex contains the text of the four Gospels, on 283 parchment leaves (size 21 cm by 15 cm). The text is written in one column per page, 21-23 lines per page.

The text is divided according to the κεφαλαια (chapters), whose numbers are given at the margin, and their τιτλοι (titles of chapters) at the top of the pages. There is also another division according to the smaller Ammonian Sections (in Mark 232 Sections, last in 16:8), without references to the Eusebian Canons.

It contains Eusebian tables at the beginning, subscriptions at the end of each Gospel, and pictures. The manuscript is ornamented.

== Text ==
The Greek text of the codex is a representative of the Byzantine text-type. Hermann von Soden classified it to the Antiocheian commentated text (A^{k}), it means the Byzantine commentated text. Aland placed it in Category V.

According to the Claremont Profile Method it represents textual family K^{x} in Luke 1 and Luke 10. In Luke 20 it represents textual family Πb. It creates cluster with 281 in Luke 1 and Luke 10.

== History ==
Scrivener dated the manuscript to the 14th century; Gregory dated the manuscript to the 12th century. The manuscript is currently dated by the INTF to the 12th century.

In 1876 it was signalled in catalogue of Cremus.

It was added to the list of New Testament manuscripts by Scrivener (849) and Gregory (760). Gregory saw the manuscript in 1886.

The manuscript is now housed at the National Library of Greece (153) in Athens.

== See also ==
- List of New Testament minuscules
- Biblical manuscript
- Textual criticism
- Minuscule 759
