= Minuscule 773 =

- New Testament manuscript
- Text: Gospels †
- Date: 10th century
- Script: Greek
- Now at: National Library of Greece
- Size: 34 cm by 24.5 cm
- Type: Byzantine text-type
- Category: V
- Note: commentary

Minuscule 773 (in the Gregory-Aland numbering), A^{14} (von Soden), is a Greek minuscule manuscript of the New Testament written on parchment. Palaeographically it has been assigned to the 10th century. The manuscript has no complex contents. Scrivener labelled it as 868^{e}.

== Description ==
The codex contains the text of the four Gospels, on 285 parchment leaves (size 34 cm by 24.5 cm), with some lacunae. It lacks the text of Matthew 1:1-5:46. The text is written in one column per page, 15 lines per page (biblical text), and 57 lines per page (commentary's text). It has a commentary; several Isagogae from Eusebius, Isidor, Hesychius, Methodius, Cosmas, John of Damascus, Cyril of Alexandria.

The text is divided according to the κεφαλαια (chapters), whose numbers are given at the margin, with their τιτλοι (titles) at the top of the pages. There is also another division according to the smaller Ammonian Sections (in Mark 235 Sections, the last in 16:12), with references to the Eusebian Canons (written below Ammonian Section numbers).

It contains the Epistula ad Carpianum, Eusebian Canon tables at the beginning, tables of the κεφαλαια (tables of contents) before each Gospel, subscriptions at the end of each Gospel, numbers of στιχοι, and pictures. The text of the Gospels and of commentary were corrected by a later hand.

== Text ==
The Greek text of the codex is a representative of the Byzantine text-type. Aland placed it in Category V.

The manuscript was not examined by using the Claremont Profile Method.

The lacks the Pericope Adulterae (John 7:53-8:11).

== History ==
F. H. A. Scrivener dated the manuscript to the 10th century; C. R. Gregory dated the manuscript to the 11th century. The manuscript is currently dated by the INTF to the 10th century.

The manuscript was written by John, a monk. It was housed in the monastery church του Σκουτρη.

The manuscript was noticed in a catalogue from 1876.

It was added to the list of New Testament manuscripts by Scrivener (868) and Gregory (773). Gregory saw the manuscript in 1886. It was examined by Ernst von Dobschütz.

The manuscript is now housed at the National Library of Greece (56) in Athens.

== See also ==
- List of New Testament minuscules
- Biblical manuscript
- Textual criticism
- Minuscule 772
