= Minuscule 738 =

- New Testament manuscript
- Text: Gospel of Matthew, Gospel of Luke
- Date: 1327
- Script: Greek
- Now at: Bibliothèque nationale de France
- Size: 29.3 cm by 20.9 cm
- Type: ?
- Category: none
- Note: commentary

Minuscule 738 (in the Gregory-Aland numbering), Θ^{ε43} (von Soden), is a Greek minuscule manuscript of the New Testament written on paper. It is dated by a colophon to 1327 CE. The manuscript has complex contents. Scrivener labelled it as 756^{e}.

== Description ==
The codex contains the text of the Gospel of Matthew and Gospel of Luke on 81 paper leaves (size 29.3 cm by 20.9 cm). One leaf was supplied by a later hand. The text is written in one column per page, 34-41 lines per page.

The text is divided according to the κεφαλαια (chapters), whose numbers are given at the margin, and their τιτλοι (titles) at the top. There is no another division according to the smaller Ammonian Sections, with a references to the Eusebian Canons.

It has a commentary of Theophylact.

== Text ==
Aland the Greek text of the codex did not place in any Category.

It was not examined by the Claremont Profile Method.

== History ==
According to the colophon the manuscript was written in 1327.

The manuscript was added to the list of New Testament manuscripts by Scrivener (756) and Gregory (738). It was examined and described by Paulin Martin. Gregory saw the manuscript in 1885.

The manuscript is now housed at the Bibliothèque nationale de France (Gr. 205) in Paris.

== See also ==
- List of New Testament minuscules
- Biblical manuscript
- Textual criticism
