= Minuscule 746 =

- New Testament manuscript
- Text: Gospels
- Date: 11th century
- Script: Greek
- Now at: Bibliothèque nationale de France
- Size: 27 cm by 20 cm
- Type: Byzantine text-type
- Category: V
- Note: commentary

Minuscule 746 (in the Gregory-Aland numbering), A^{120} (von Soden), is a Greek minuscule manuscript of the New Testament written on parchment. Palaeographically it has been assigned to the 11th century. The manuscript has complex contents. Scrivener labelled it as 740^{e}.

== Description ==
The codex contains a complete text of the four Gospels on 396 parchment leaves (size 27 cm by 20 cm). The text is written in one column per page, 27 lines per page for biblical text, and 52 lines per page for a commentary's text.

The text is divided according to the κεφαλαια (chapters), whose numbers are given at the margin, and their τιτλοι (titles) at the top. There is also another division according to the smaller Ammonian Sections (in Mark 233 sections), with a references to the Eusebian Canons.

It contains the Epistula ad Carpianum, Eusebian tables, Prolegomena, tables of the κεφαλαια before each Gospel, and subscriptions. αναγνωσεις (lessons) were added by a later hand.

It has a commentary of Theophylact.

== Text ==
The Greek text of the codex is a representative of the Byzantine text-type. Aland placed it in Category V.

It was not examined by using the Claremont Profile Method.

The text of the Pericope Adulterae (John 7:53-8:11) is omitted. According to Scrivener the leaf probably lost.

== History ==
Scrivener dated the manuscript to the 10th century, Martin to the 10th century; Gregory dated it to the 11th century. The manuscript is currently dated by the INTF to the 11th century.

The manuscript came from Athos.

The manuscript was added to the list of New Testament manuscripts by Scrivener (740) and Gregory (746). It was examined and described by Paulin Martin. Gregory saw the manuscript in 1885.

The manuscript is now housed at the Bibliothèque nationale de France (Suppl. Gr. 611) in Paris.

== See also ==
- List of New Testament minuscules
- Biblical manuscript
- Textual criticism
- Minuscule 745
