= Minuscule 753 =

- New Testament manuscript
- Text: Gospel of Matthew
- Date: 11th century
- Script: Greek
- Now at: Bibliothèque nationale de France
- Size: 20.3 cm by 15.1 cm
- Type: Byzantine text-type
- Category: none
- Note: —

Minuscule 753 (in the Gregory-Aland numbering), ε1292 (von Soden), is a Greek minuscule manuscript of the New Testament written on parchment. Palaeographically it has been assigned to the 11th century. The manuscript has no complex contents. Scrivener labelled it as 760^{e}.

== Description ==
The codex contains the text of the Gospel of Matthew (23:11-21), on 1 parchment leaf (size 20.3 cm by 15.1 cm).

The text is written in one column per page, 22 lines per page.

The text is divided according to the Ammonian Sections, without references to the Eusebian Canons, it contains lectionary markings, but they were added by a later hand.

== Minuscule 2819 ==
The leaf with text of Matthew 6:6-20 is classified as minuscule 2819 on the list Gregory-Aland. The size of the leaf is 15.5 cm by 11.6 cm). It is written in 1 column per page, 19 lines per page. It contains lectionary markings.

== Text ==
Aland the Greek text of the codex did not place it in any Category.

== History ==
Gregory dated the manuscript 753 to the 11th or 12th century. The manuscript is currently dated by the INTF to the 11th century. The manuscript 2819 Gregory dated to the 12th or 13th century.

It was added to the list of New Testament manuscripts by Scrivener (760) and Gregory (753). Gregory saw the manuscript in 1885.

The manuscript is now housed at the Bibliothèque nationale de France (Suppl. Gr. 1035) in Paris.

== See also ==
- List of New Testament minuscules
- Biblical manuscript
- Textual criticism
- Minuscule 752
