= Minuscule 770 =

- New Testament manuscript
- Text: Gospel of Matthew †, Gospel of John
- Date: 12th century
- Script: Greek
- Now at: National Library of Greece
- Size: 26.5 cm by 21 cm
- Type: Byzantine text-type
- Category: V
- Note: commentary

Minuscule 770 (in the Gregory-Aland numbering), A^{148} (von Soden), is a Greek minuscule manuscript of the New Testament written on parchment. Palaeographically it has been assigned to the 12th century. The manuscript has not been preserved in its entirety. Scrivener labelled it as 862^{e}.

== Description ==
The codex contains the text of the Gospel of Matthew and Gospel of John, on 270 parchment leaves (size 26.5 cm by 21 cm), with lacunae. It lacks the text of Matthew 1:1-5:46. The text is written in one column per page, 24-26 lines per page.

The text is divided according to the κεφαλαια (chapters), whose numbers are given at the margin, with their τιτλοι (titles) at the top of the pages.

It contains a commentary. The text of the Gospels as well as a commentary was corrected by a later hand.

== Text ==
The Greek text of the codex is a representative of the Byzantine text-type. Aland placed it in Category V.

The lacks the Pericope Adulterae (John 7:53-8:11).

== History ==
F. H. A. Scrivener dated the manuscript to the 11th century; Gregory dated the manuscript to the 12th century. The manuscript is currently dated by the INTF to the 12th century.

The manuscript was noted in a catalogue from 1876.

It was added to the list of New Testament manuscripts by Scrivener (862) and Gregory (770). Gregory saw the manuscript in 1886.

The manuscript is now housed at the National Library of Greece (203) in Athens.

== See also ==
- List of New Testament minuscules
- Biblical manuscript
- Textual criticism
- Minuscule 769
