= Minuscule 715 =

- New Testament manuscript
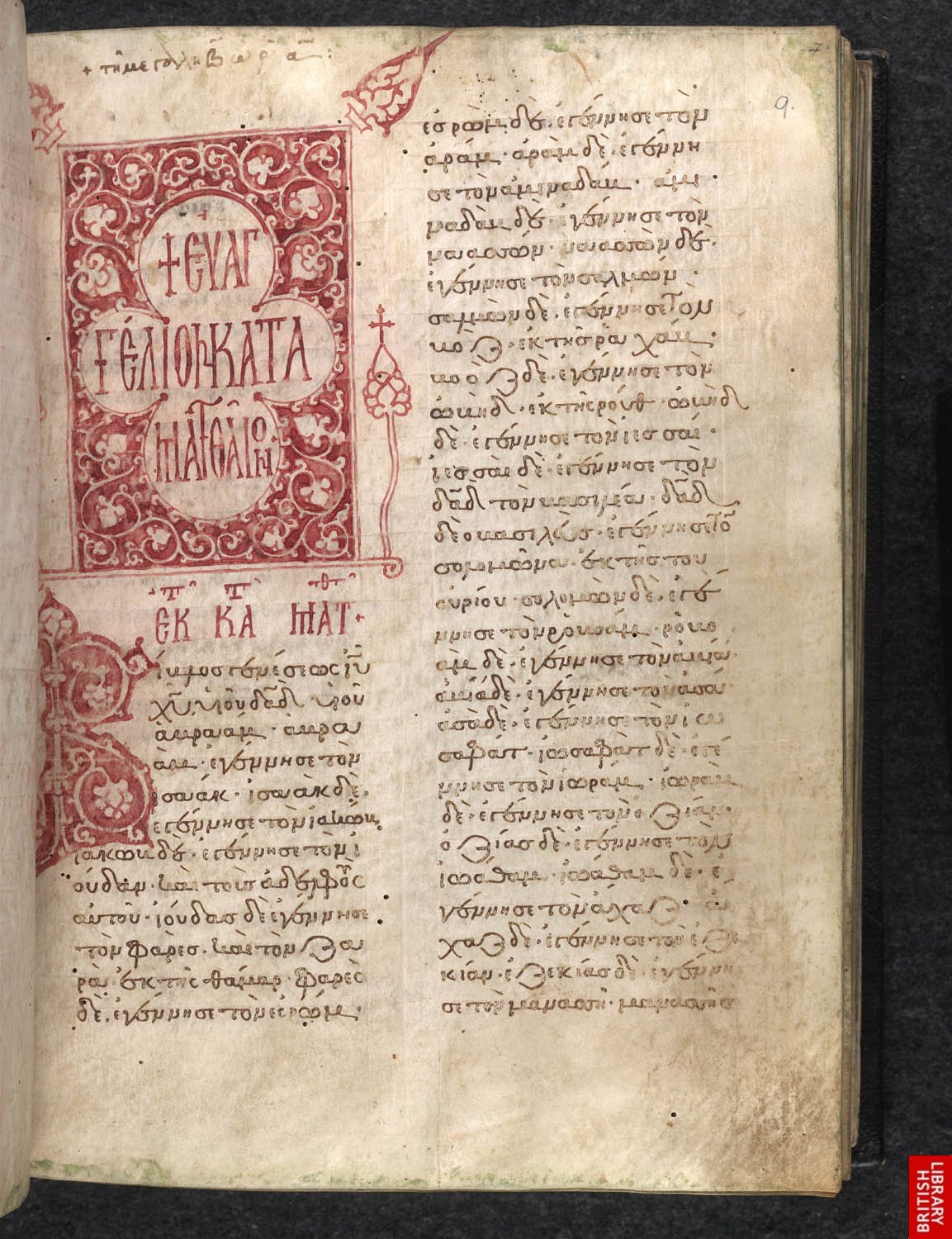
- The beginning of Matthew, the decorated headpiece
- Text: Gospels
- Date: 13th century
- Script: Greek
- Now at: British Library
- Size: 27 cm by 20.9 cm
- Type: Byzantine text-type
- Category: V
- Note: marginalia

Minuscule 715 (in the Gregory-Aland numbering), ε364 (von Soden), is a Greek minuscule manuscript of the New Testament, on parchment. Palaeographically it has been assigned to the 13th century. The manuscript has complex contents. Scrivener labelled it as 564^{e}. It has marginalia.

== Description ==
The codex contains the text of the four Gospels, on 176 parchment leaves (size 27 cm by 20.9 cm), and two unfoliated modern paper flyleaves at the beginning and end.

The text is written in two columns per page, 27-29 lines per page. The manuscript has ornamented headpieces, the large initial letters in red, the small initials in red.

The manuscript contains Prolegomena, lists of the κεφαλαια (tables of contents) before each Gospel. The text is divided according to the κεφαλαια (chapters), whose numbers are given at the margin of the text and their τιτλοι (titles of chapters) are given at the top. There is also another division according to the smaller Ammonian Sections (in Mark 237 Sections, the last section in 16:15), which numbers are given at the margin, but without a references to the Eusebian Canons.

It contains lectionary markings at the margin (added by a later hand), incipits, Synaxarion, Menologion, subscriptions at the end of each Gospel, numbers of ρηματα, and numbers of στιχοι.

It contains extracts from a commentary of Eulogius of Alexandria and diagnosis of Hesychius (folios 175-176).

== Text ==
The Greek text of the codex is a representative of the Byzantine text-type. Hermann von Soden classified it to A^{k}, related to the Byzantine commentated text (along with 534, 546, 558, 573). Kurt Aland placed it in Category V.

According to the Claremont Profile Method it represents textual family K^{x} in Luke 1 and Luke 10. In Luke 20 it has mixed Byzantine text.

Textual variants

The word before the bracket is the reading of the UBS edition, the word after the bracket is the reading of the manuscript. The reading of Textus Receptus in bold.

Mark 1:2 – καθως γεγραπται ] ως γεγραπται
Mark 1:2 – εν τω Ησαια τω προφητη ] εν τοις προφεταις
Mark 1:5 – παντες, και εβαπτιζοντο υπ αυτου εν τω Ιορδανη ποταμω ] και εβαπτιζοντο παντες εν τω Ιορδανη ποταμω υπ αυτου

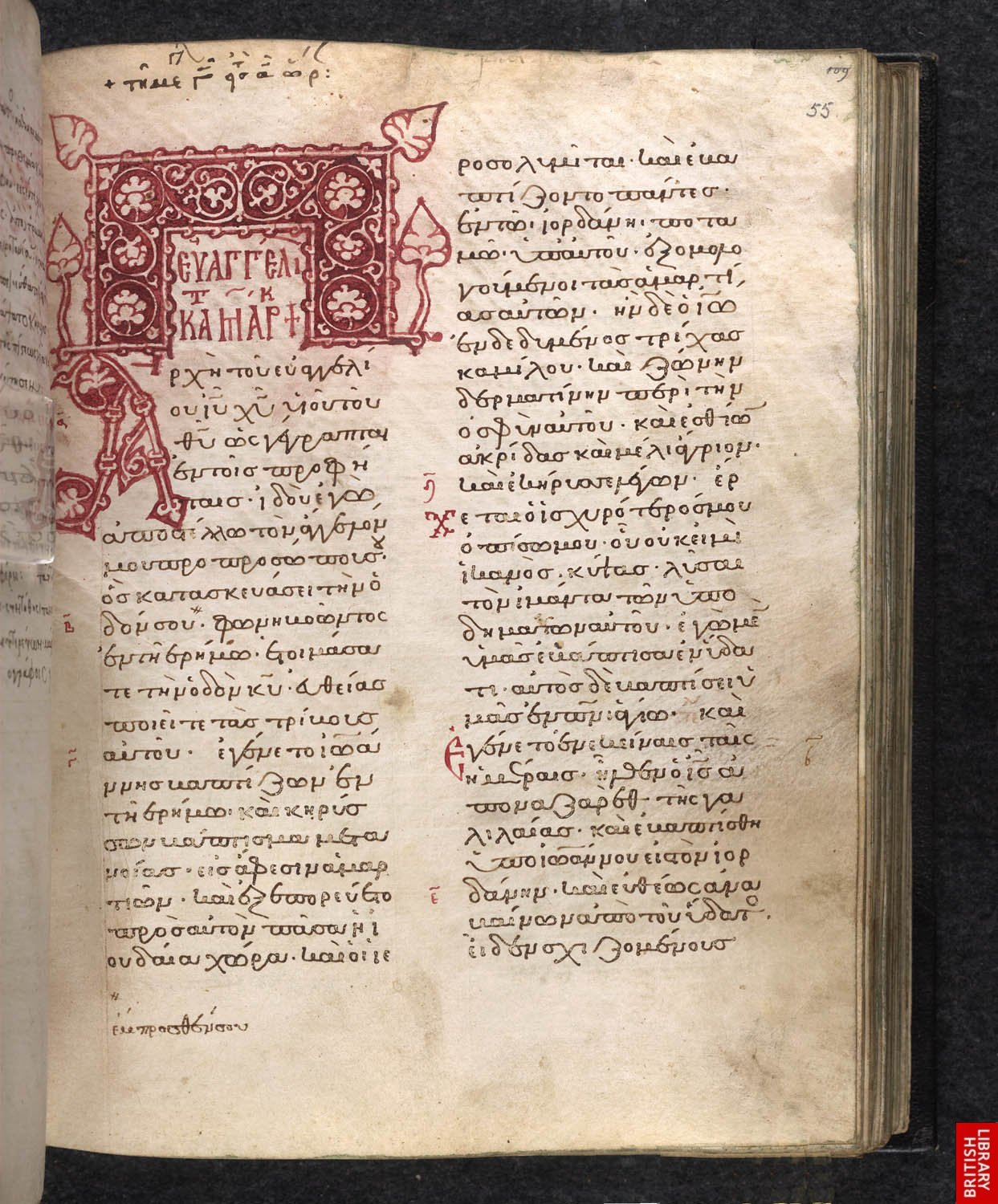
Folio 55, the beginning of Mark

== History ==
Scrivener dated the manuscript to the 13th century, Gregory dated it to the 13th or 14th century. Currently the manuscript is dated by the INTF to the 13th century.

Note in Greek on folio 2 with date 25 August 1720. James Woodhouse († 1866), Treasurer-General of the Ionian Islands. It was bought by Dean Burgon, then belonged to W. F. Rose, and bought for the British Museum in 1893 (along with minuscule 714, 716).

It was added to the list of New Testament manuscripts by Scrivener (564) and Gregory (715). Gregory saw the manuscript in 1883. The text was collated by Rose.

The manuscript is now housed at the British Library (Egerton MS 2785).

== See also ==
- List of New Testament minuscules
- Biblical manuscript
- Textual criticism
