= Minuscule 762 =

- New Testament manuscript
- Text: Gospels
- Date: 14th century
- Script: Greek
- Now at: National Library of Greece
- Size: 21 cm by 15 cm
- Type: Byzantine text-type
- Category: V
- Note: —

Minuscule 762 (in the Gregory-Aland numbering), ε477 (von Soden), is a Greek minuscule manuscript of the New Testament written on parchment. Palaeographically it has been assigned to the 14th century. Scrivener labelled it as 852^{e}.

== Description ==
The codex contains the text of the four Gospels, on 332 parchment leaves (size 21 cm by 15 cm). The text is written in one column per page, 21 lines per page.

The text is divided according to the κεφαλαια (chapters), whose numbers are given at the margin, and their τιτλοι (titles) at the top of the pages.

It contains Epistula ad Carpianum, Eusebian tables, Prolegomena, lectionary markings at the margin, subscription to the Gospel of Mark, and Synaxarion.

== Text ==
The Greek text of the codex is a representative of the Byzantine text-type. Hermann von Soden classified it to the textual family K^{x}. Aland placed it in Category V.

According to the Claremont Profile Method it represents textual family K^{x} in Luke 10. In Luke 1 and Luke 20 it has mixed Byzantine text.

== History ==
Scrivener dated the manuscript to the 14th century; Gregory dated the manuscript to the 14th century. The manuscript is currently dated by the INTF to the 14th century.

It was written by Markos, a monk.

In 1843 the manuscript was brought from the monastery of St. George in Locris to Athens, along with 763.

It was added to the list of New Testament manuscripts by Scrivener (852) and Gregory (762). Gregory saw the manuscript in 1886.

The manuscript is now housed at the National Library of Greece (155) in Athens.

== See also ==
- List of New Testament minuscules
- Biblical manuscript
- Textual criticism
- Minuscule 761
