= Minuscule 735 =

- New Testament manuscript
- Text: Gospel of Matthew, Gospel of Luke
- Date: 15th century
- Script: Greek
- Now at: Bibliothèque nationale de France
- Size: 23.8 cm by 15.5 cm
- Type: ?
- Category: none
- Note: commentary

Minuscule 735 (in the Gregory-Aland numbering), Θ^{ε322} (von Soden), is a Greek minuscule manuscript of the New Testament written on parchment. Palaeographically it has been assigned to the 15th century. The manuscript has no complex contents. Scrivener labelled it as 753^{e}.

== Description ==
The codex contains the text of the Gospel of Matthew and Gospel of Luke on 164 parchment leaves (size 23.8 cm by 15.5 cm), with one lacuna (Matthew 1:1-12:33). The text of Luke 1:1-5 was supplied by a later hand. The text is written in one column per page, 40-50 lines per page.

The text is divided according to the κεφαλαια (chapters), whose numbers are given at the margin, and their τιτλοι (titles) at the top of the pages. There is no other division according to the smaller Ammonian Sections, with references to the Eusebian Canons.

It has a commentary, and portrait of Evangelist Matthew.

Partially it is a palimpsest (leaves 49-164). The earlier text is written in uncial script. It contains Homilies of Saint Basil.

== Text ==
Aland did not place the Greek text of the codex in any Category.

It was not examined by using the Claremont Profile Method.

== History ==
Scrivener dated the manuscript to the 13th century, Gregory dated it to the 15th century. The manuscript is currently dated by the INTF to the 15th century.

The manuscript was added to the list of New Testament manuscripts by Scrivener (753) and Gregory (735). It was examined and described by Paulin Martin. Gregory saw the manuscript in 1885.

The manuscript is now housed at the Bibliothèque nationale de France (Gr. 196) in Paris.

== See also ==
- List of New Testament minuscules
- Biblical manuscript
- Textual criticism
