= Lectionary 61 =

Lectionary ℓ 61
- New Testament manuscript
- Text: Evangelistarion
- Date: 12th-century
- Script: Greek
- Now at: Bibliothèque nationale de France
- Size: 22 cm by 19 cm

Lectionary 61, designated by siglum ℓ 61 (in the Gregory-Aland numbering), is a Greek manuscript of the New Testament, on parchment leaves. It is a lectionary (Evangelistarion). Palaeographically it has been assigned to the 12th-century.

== Description ==
Survived only one leaf of the codex with two lessons from the Gospel of Matthew (26:67-72) and Gospel of John (19:10-20). It is written in Greek minuscule letters, on 1 parchment leaf (22 cm by 19 cm), in two columns per page, in 26 lines per page.

== History ==
The manuscript was added to the list of New Testament manuscripts by Scholz.

The manuscript is not cited in the critical editions of the Greek New Testament (UBS3).

Currently the codex is located in the Bibliothèque nationale de France (Gr. 182, fol. 342), in Paris. It was rebound with minuscule 729 (folios 1–341).

== See also ==
- List of New Testament lectionaries
- Biblical manuscript
- Textual criticism
