= Minuscule 771 =

- New Testament manuscript
- Text: Gospels †
- Date: 10th century
- Script: Greek
- Now at: National Library of Greece
- Size: 32 cm by 23 cm
- Type: ?
- Category: none
- Note: commentary

Minuscule 771 (in the Gregory-Aland numbering), A^{15} (von Soden), is a Greek minuscule manuscript of the New Testament written on parchment. Palaeographically it has been assigned to the 10th century. The manuscript has no complex contents. Scrivener labelled it as 863^{e}.

== Description ==
The codex contains the text of the four Gospels, on 153 parchment leaves (size 32 cm by 23 cm), with some lacunae. It lacks Matthew 1:1-18:9; 18:15-19.23-26.33-35; 19:7-9; Mark 2:25-3.18; Luke 1:8-27; 5:47-12.2; 12:20-39; 22:10-54; John 6:33-50; 11:27-44; 13:36-14:30; 18:22-19:16; 19:33-21:13. The texts of Mark 1:1-16; Luke 1:1-7; and John 1:1-15 were supplied by a later hand.

The text is written in one column per page, 20 lines per page.

The text is divided according to the κεφαλαια (chapters), whose numbers are given at the margin, with their τιτλοι (titles) at the top of the pages. It has not numbers of the Ammonian Sections, but it has references to the Eusebian Canons.

It contains lectionary markings (beautifully written) and a commentary of Theophylact.

== Text ==
Kurt Aland the Greek text of the codex did not place in any Category.

It was not examined by the Claremont Profile Method.

== History ==
F. H. A. Scrivener dated the manuscript to the 10th century; Gregory dated the manuscript to the 12th century. The manuscript is currently dated by the INTF to the 10th century.

The manuscript was written by Presbyter Neophytus. It was once housed at the monastery of Saint Luke in Boeotia. According to Kremus, that in the year 1821 in that monastery not only the Turks and Albanians but also the monks many manuscripts burned.

The manuscript was noticed in a catalogue from 1876.

It was added to the list of New Testament manuscripts by Scrivener (863) and Gregory (771). Gregory saw the manuscript in 1886.

The manuscript is now housed at the National Library of Greece (204) in Athens.

== See also ==
- List of New Testament minuscules
- Biblical manuscript
- Textual criticism
- Minuscule 770
