= Minuscule 748 =

- New Testament manuscript
- Text: Gospels †
- Date: 12th century
- Script: Greek
- Now at: Bibliothèque nationale de France
- Size: 23.5 cm by 15 cm
- Type: Byzantine text-type
- Category: V

Minuscule 748 (in the Gregory-Aland numbering), ε1203 (von Soden), is a Greek minuscule manuscript of the New Testament written on parchment. Palaeographically it has been assigned to the 12th century. The manuscript has no complex contents. Scrivener labelled it as 758^{e}.

== Description ==
The codex contains a complete text of the four Gospels on 278 parchment leaves (size 23.5 cm by 15 cm), with numerous lacunae. The leaves are arranged in octavo (eight leaves in quire). The text is written in one column per page, 19 lines per page.

Contents

Matthew 7:25-8:28; 12:36-13:8; 13:38-28:20; Mark 1:1-6:1; 6:10-7:22; 7:23-16:20; Luke 1:1-3:18; 3:34-8:53; 9:9-16:11; 16:21-23:49; 24:6-53; John 1:1-15:6; 16:19-18:18; 18:38-19:29.

The text is divided according to the κεφαλαια (chapters), whose numbers are given at the margin, and their τιτλοι (titles) at the top. There is also another division according to the smaller Ammonian Sections (in Mark 237 sections, last numbered sections ends in 16:15), without references to the Eusebian Canons.

It contains tables of the κεφαλαια (tables of contents) before each Gospel, lectionary markings at the margin, incipits, and subscriptions at the end of the Gospels.

== Text ==
The Greek text of the codex is a representative of the Byzantine text-type. Aland placed it in Category V.

Hermann von Soden classified it to the textual family I^{r}. According to the Claremont Profile Method it belongs to the textual cluster 686.

== History ==
Scrivener and Gregory dated the manuscript to the 12th century. The manuscript is currently dated by the INTF to the 12th century.

It was added to the list of New Testament manuscripts by Scrivener (758) and Gregory (748). Gregory saw the manuscript in 1885.

The manuscript is now housed at the Bibliothèque nationale de France (Suppl. Gr. 903) in Paris.

== See also ==
- List of New Testament minuscules
- Biblical manuscript
- Textual criticism
- Minuscule 747
