= Minuscule 749 =

- New Testament manuscript
- Text: Gospels †
- Date: 13th century
- Script: Greek
- Now at: Bibliothèque nationale de France
- Size: 33 cm by 24.1 cm
- Type: Byzantine text-type/mixed
- Category: none
- Note: commentary

Minuscule 749 (in the Gregory-Aland numbering), Θ^{ε202} (von Soden), is a Greek minuscule manuscript of the New Testament written on parchment. Palaeographically it has been assigned to the 13th century. The manuscript has no complex contents. Scrivener labelled it as 773^{e}.

== Description ==
The codex contains the text of the four Gospels on 199 parchment leaves (size 33 cm by 24.1 cm), with some lacunae. It lacks text of Matthew 1:1-3:10; 4:3-7:28; 12:1-24:26; 24:44-28:20; Mark 14:62-16:20; Luke 2:51-5:12; 5:26-11:51; 21:34-38; 22:28-34; John 1:15-5:45; 19:35-20:1; 21:19-fin.

The text is written in one column per page, 41-42 lines per page.

The text is divided according to the κεφαλαια (chapters), whose numbers are given at the margin, and their τιτλοι (titles) at the top.

It contains Prolegomena and a commentary of Theophylact.

== Text ==
Aland the Greek text of the codex did not place in any Category.

It was not examined according to the Claremont Profile Method.

== History ==
F. H. A. Scrivener dated the manuscript to the 12th or 13th century and C. R. Gregory dated the manuscript to the 13th century. The manuscript is currently dated by the INTF to the 13th century.

It was added to the list of New Testament manuscripts by Scrivener (773) and Gregory (749). It was examined and described by Paulin Martin. Gregory saw the manuscript in 1885.

The manuscript is now housed at the Bibliothèque nationale de France (Suppl. Gr. 904) in Paris.

== See also ==
- List of New Testament minuscules
- Biblical manuscript
- Textual criticism
- Minuscule 748
