= Minuscule 750 =

Coordinates: 48.833577°N 2.375745°E

- New Testament manuscript
- Text: Gospels
- Date: 12th century
- Script: Greek
- Now at: Bibliothèque nationale de France
- Size: 30.7 cm by 22 cm
- Type: Byzantine text-type
- Category: V

Minuscule 750 (in the Gregory-Aland numbering), ε1204 (von Soden), is a Greek minuscule manuscript of the New Testament written on parchment. Palaeographically it has been assigned to the 12th century. The manuscript has no complex contents. Scrivener labelled it as 742^{e}.

== Description ==
The codex contains a complete text of the four Gospels on 319 parchment leaves (size 30.7 cm by 12 cm). The text is written in one column per page, 20 lines per page.

The text is divided according to the κεφαλαια (chapters), whose numbers are given at the margin, and their τιτλοι (titles) at the top. There is also another division according to the smaller Ammonian Sections (inMark 241 Sections, the last in 16:20), without references to the Eusebian Canons.

It contains tables of the κεφαλαια (tables of contents) before each Gospel, and subscriptions at the end of each Gospel, and pictures.

== Text ==
The Greek text of the codex is a representative of the Byzantine text-type. Aland placed it in Category V.

Hermann von Soden classified it to the textual family K^{x}. According to the Claremont Profile Method it belongs to the textual cluster M27 in Luke 1, Luke 10, and Luke 20. It creates a textual pari with 1222.

== History ==
Scrivener dated the manuscript to the 11th or 12th century; Gregory dated the manuscript to the 12th century. The manuscript is currently dated by the INTF to the 12th century.

It was added to the list of New Testament manuscripts by Scrivener (742) and Gregory (750). It was described by Paulin Martin. Gregory saw the manuscript in 1885.

The manuscript is now housed at the Bibliothèque nationale de France (Suppl. Gr. 914) in Paris.

== See also ==
- List of New Testament minuscules
- Biblical manuscript
- Textual criticism
- Minuscule 749
