= Minuscule 714 =

- New Testament manuscript
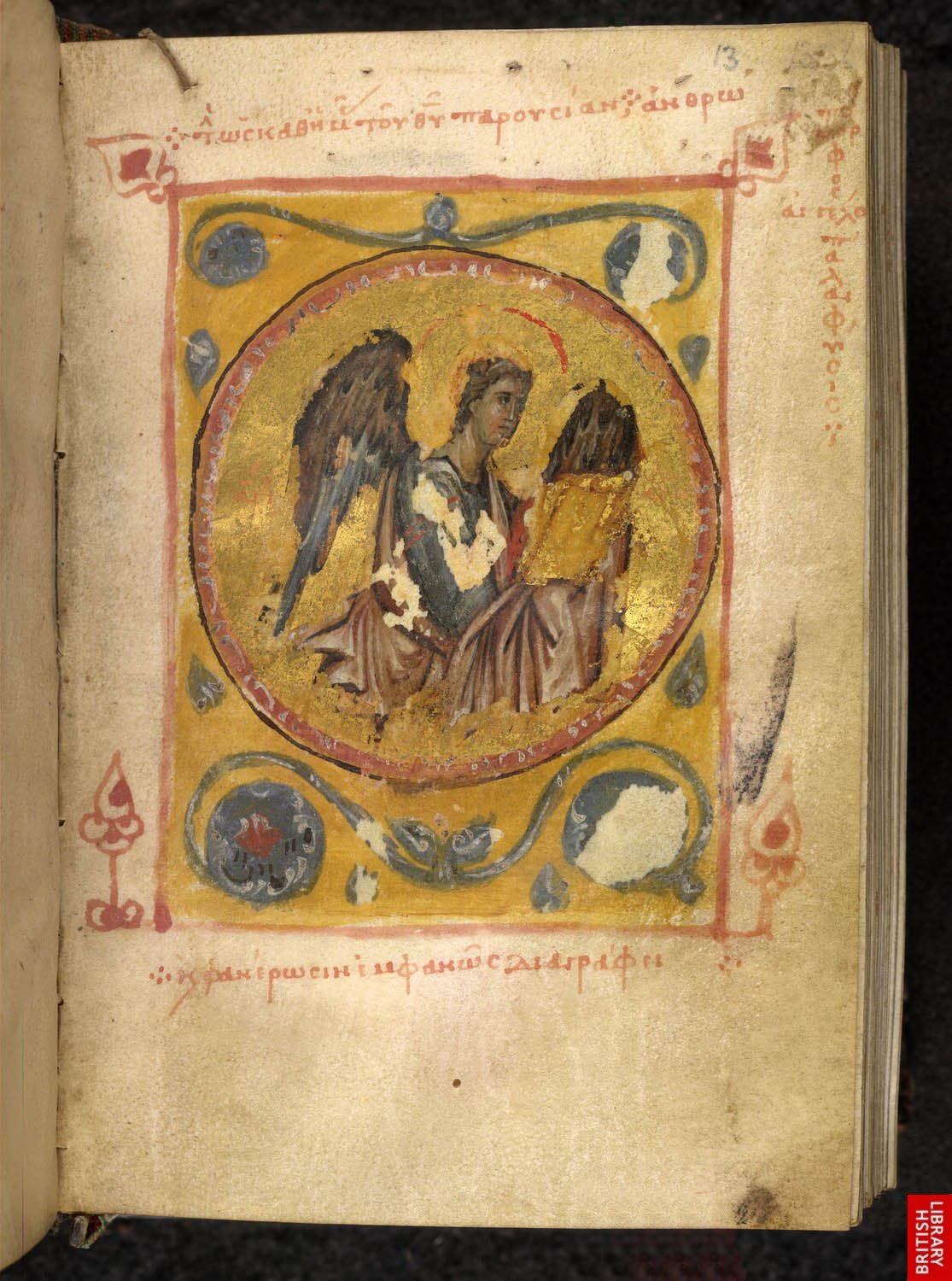
- Evangelist Matthew
- Name: Codex Algerina Peckower 2
- Text: Gospels †
- Date: 13th century
- Script: Greek
- Now at: British Library
- Size: 13.8 cm by 9.5 cm
- Type: Byzantine text-type
- Category: V
- Note: –

Minuscule 714 (in the Gregory-Aland numbering), ε1392 (von Soden), is a Greek minuscule manuscript of the New Testament, on parchment in the British Library. Palaeographically it has been assigned to the 13th century. The manuscript is lacunose. Scrivener labelled it as 563^{e}.

The manuscript contains also a fragment of Sentences of Peter Lombard.

== Description ==
The codex contains the text of the four Gospels, on 338 parchment leaves (size 13.8 cm by 9.5 cm), with one lacuna (gap in the text). It lacks texts of John 20:17-21:25.

The text is written in one column per page, 22 lines per page. The manuscript is ornamented, the large initial letters in red, the small initials are in red.

The text is divided according to the κεφαλαια (chapters), whose numbers are given at the margin of the text and their τιτλοι (titles of chapters) are given at the top. There is also another division according to the smaller Ammonian Sections, whose numbers are given at the margin, with references to the Eusebian Canons.

The manuscript contains the Epistula ad Carpianum, Prolegomena, the Eusebian Canon tables, lists of the κεφαλαια before each Gospel. It contains lectionary markings at the margin, incipits, Synaxarion, Menologion, subscriptions at the end, and numbers of στιχοι. It contains seven miniatures in colours on gold, four of them with symbols of the four Evangelists, and three with portraits of the Evangelists (except Luke).

It has special liturgical directions.

The manuscript contains also a fragment of Sententiae of Peter Lombard (size 13 cm × 8 cm). The large initial letters in colours and gold, the small initials in blue.

The text of the manuscript was corrected by the original scribe.

== Text ==
The Greek text of the codex is a representative of the Byzantine text-type. Hermann von Soden classified it to the textual family K^{x}. Kurt Aland placed it in Category V.

According to the Claremont Profile Method it represents K^{x} in Luke 1 and Luke 20. In Luke 10 no profile was made.

== History ==
Scrivener dated the manuscript to the 13th century, Gregory dated it to the 13th or 14th century. The manuscript is dated by the INTF to the 13th century. Place of origin is unknown.

The manuscript was brought from Corfu by Dean Burgon, then belonged to W. F. Rose, and bought for the British Museum in 1893 (along with minuscule 715, 716).

It was added to the list of New Testament manuscripts by Scrivener (563) and Gregory (714). Gregory saw the manuscript in 1883. The text was collated by Rose.

The manuscript is housed at the British Library in London (Egerton MS 2783).

== See also ==
- List of New Testament minuscules
- Biblical manuscript
- Textual criticism
