= Minuscule 774 =

- New Testament manuscript
- Text: Gospels
- Date: 11th century
- Script: Greek
- Now at: National Library of Greece
- Size: 26 cm by 20 cm
- Type: Byzantine text-type
- Category: V
- Note: –

Minuscule 774 (in the Gregory-Aland numbering), ε194 (von Soden), is a Greek minuscule manuscript of the New Testament written on parchment. Palaeographically it has been assigned to the 11th century. The manuscript has complex contents. Scrivener labelled it as 869^{e}. It has marginalia and liturgical books.

== Description ==
The codex contains the text of the four Gospels, on 370 parchment leaves (size 26 cm by 20 cm). The text is written in one column per page, 20 lines per page.

The text is divided according to the κεφαλαια (chapters), whose numbers are given at the margin, with their τιτλοι (titles) at the top of the pages. There is also another division according to the smaller Ammonian Sections (in Mark 234 Sections, the last 16:9), with references to the Eusebian Canons (written below Ammonian Section numbers).

It contains Epistula ad Carpianum, Eusebian tables (double), tables of the κεφαλαια (tables of contents) before each Gospel, liturgical books with hagiographies (Synaxarion and Menologion), subscriptions at the end of each Gospel, and pictures.

== Text ==
The Greek text of the codex is a representative of the Byzantine text-type. Hermann von Soden classified it to the textual family K^{x}. Aland placed it in Category V.

According to the Claremont Profile Method it represent the textual family K^{x} in Luke 1, Luke 10, and Luke 20.

== History ==
F. H. A. Scrivener dated the manuscript to the 11th/12th century; Gregory dated the manuscript to the 12th century. The manuscript is currently dated by the INTF to the 11th century.

Formerly the manuscript was held in monasteries in Constantinople, as codices 87 and 178.

The manuscript was noticed in catalogue from 1876.

It was added to the list of New Testament manuscripts by Scrivener (869) and Gregory (774). Gregory saw the manuscript in 1886.

The manuscript is now housed at the National Library of Greece (57) in Athens.

== See also ==
- List of New Testament minuscules
- Biblical manuscript
- Textual criticism
- Minuscule 773
