= Minuscule 732 =

- New Testament manuscript
- Text: Gospels †
- Date: 13th century
- Script: Greek
- Now at: Bibliothèque nationale de France
- Size: 31 cm by 20.8 cm
- Type: ?
- Category: none
- Note: commentary

Minuscule 732 (in the Gregory-Aland numbering), Θ^{ε416} (von Soden), is a Greek minuscule manuscript of the New Testament written on paper. Palaeographically it has been assigned to the 13th century. The manuscript has no complex contents. Scrivener labelled it as 750^{e}.

== Description ==
The codex contains the text of the four Gospels on 271 paper leaves (size 31 cm by 20.8 cm), with one lacuna (John 21:22-25).

The text is written in one column per page, 49-50 lines per page.

The text is divided according to the κεφαλαια (chapters), whose numbers are given at the margin, and their τιτλοι (titles) at the top. There is also another division according to the smaller Ammonian Sections, but there are no references to the Eusebian Canons.

It contains double Prolegomena, lists of the κεφαλαια (tables of contents) before each Gospel, lectionary markings, and numbers of verses at the end of each Gospel. It has a commentary of Theophylact, and Synaxarion.

== Text ==
Aland did not place the Greek text of the codex in any Category.

It was not examined by using the Claremont Profile Method.

== History ==
Scrivener and Gregory dated the manuscript to the 13th or 14th century. The manuscript is currently dated by the INTF to the 13th century.

Minuscule 745 could be rewritten from this manuscript.

The manuscript was added to the list of New Testament manuscripts by Scrivener (750) and Gregory (732). It was examined and described by Paulin Martin. Gregory saw the manuscript in 1885.

The manuscript is now housed at the Bibliothèque nationale de France (Gr. 185) in Paris.

== See also ==
- List of New Testament minuscules
- Biblical manuscript
- Textual criticism
