= Minuscule 752 =

- New Testament manuscript
- Text: Gospels
- Date: 12th century
- Script: Greek
- Now at: Bibliothèque nationale de France
- Size: 15.6 cm by 11.6 cm
- Type: Byzantine text-type
- Category: none
- Note: —

Minuscule 752 (in the Gregory-Aland numbering), ε1292 (von Soden), is a Greek minuscule manuscript of the New Testament written on parchment. Palaeographically it has been assigned to the 12th century. The manuscript has no complex contents. Scrivener labelled it as 774^{e}.

== Description ==
The codex contains the text of the four Gospels, on 199 parchment leaves (size 15.6 cm by 11.6 cm), with only one lacuna (Matthew 15:2-29).

The text is written in one column per page, 27 lines per page.

The text is divided according to the κεφαλαια (chapters), whose numbers are given at the margin, and their τιτλοι (titles) at the top. There is also another division according to the smaller Ammonian Sections (in Mark 234 sections), without a references to the Eusebian Canons.

It contains subscription, Verse, lectionary markings (later hand), and pictures. Synaxarion and Menologion were added by a later hand on paper.

== Text ==
The Greek text of the codex is a representative of the Byzantine text-type. Hermann von Soden classified it as Byzantine commentated text. Aland did not place it in any Category.

According to the Claremont Profile Method it represents textual group 1216 in Luke 1 and Luke 20. In Luke 10 no profile was made.

== History ==
Scrivener and Gregory dated the manuscript to the 12th or 13th century. The manuscript is currently dated by the INTF to the 12th century.

It was added to the list of New Testament manuscripts by Scrivener (774) and Gregory (752). It was examined and described by Paulin Martin. Gregory saw the manuscript in 1885.

The manuscript is now housed at the Bibliothèque nationale de France (Suppl. Gr. 927) in Paris.

== See also ==
- List of New Testament minuscules
- Biblical manuscript
- Textual criticism
- Minuscule 751
