= Minuscule 747 =

- New Testament manuscript
- Text: Gospels
- Date: 1164
- Script: Greek
- Now at: Bibliothèque nationale de France
- Size: 24.4 cm by 19.7 cm
- Type: Byzantine text-type/mixed
- Category: none
- Note: commentary

Minuscule 747 (in the Gregory-Aland numbering), A^{220} (von Soden), is a Greek minuscule manuscript of the New Testament written on parchment. It is dated by a Colophon to 1164 CE. The manuscript has complex contents. Scrivener labelled it as 741^{e}.

== Description ==
The codex contains a complete text of the four Gospels on 376 parchment leaves (size 24.4 cm by 19.7 cm). The text is written in one column per page, 9-25 lines per page for biblical text, and 47 lines per page for a commentary's text.

The text is divided according to the κεφαλαια (chapters), whose numbers are given at the margin, and their τιτλοι (titles) at the top. There is also another division according to the smaller Ammonian Sections (Mark 241 sections, the last section in 16:20), with references to the Eusebian Canons (written below Ammonian Section numbers).

It contains the Epistula ad Carpianum, Eusebian Canon tables, tables of the κεφαλαια (tables of contents) before each Gospel, and pictures. Lectionary markings at the margin were added by a later hand.

It has a commentary, John 6:19-21:25 has not a commentary.

== Text ==
Aland the Greek text of the codex did not place in any Category.

According to the Claremont Profile Method it represents textual family K^{x} in Luke 10 and Luke 20. In Luke 1 it has mixed Byzantine text.

== History ==
According to the colophon the manuscript was written in 1164. In that way Scrivener and von Soden deciphered colophon. Gregory deciphered it as 1164 or 1169. According to Hermann von Soden the colophon could be added by a later hand.

The manuscript was added to the list of New Testament manuscripts by Scrivener (741) and Gregory (747). It was examined and described by Paulin Martin. Gregory saw the manuscript in 1885.

The manuscript was examined by Kirsopp Lake.

The manuscript is now housed at the Bibliothèque nationale de France (Suppl. Gr. 612) in Paris.

== See also ==
- List of New Testament minuscules
- Biblical manuscript
- Textual criticism
- Minuscule 746
