= Minuscule 751 =

- New Testament manuscript
- Text: Gospel of Matthew †
- Date: 13th century
- Script: Greek
- Now at: Bibliothèque nationale de France
- Size: 15 cm by 12.4 cm
- Type: —
- Category: none
- Note: —

Minuscule 751 (in the Gregory-Aland numbering), ε380 (von Soden), is a Greek minuscule manuscript of the New Testament written on parchment. Palaeographically it has been assigned to the 13th century. The manuscript has no complex contents. Scrivener labelled it as 739^{e}.

== Description ==
Originally the codex contained the text of the Gospels. To the present time survived only 19 parchment leaves (size 15 cm by 12.4 cm). It has only text of Matthew 2:13-9:17.

The text is written in one column per page, 47 lines per page.

The text is divided according to the κεφαλαια (chapters), whose numbers are given at the margin, and their τιτλοι (titles) at the top. There is also another division according to the smaller Ammonian Sections, with a references to the Eusebian Canons.

It contains the Eusebian tables, Prolegomena, tables of the κεφαλαια (tables of contents) before each Gospel, liturgical books Synaxarion and Menologion (remarkable for peculiar art), and lectionary markings at the margin for liturgical reading.

== Text ==
Aland did not place the Greek text of the codex in any Category.

It was not examined according to the Claremont Profile Method.

== History ==
Scrivener and Gregory dated the manuscript to the 13th century. The manuscript is currently dated by the INTF to the 13th century.

It was added to the list of New Testament manuscripts by Scrivener (739) and Gregory (751). It was examined and described by Paulin Martin. Gregory saw the manuscript in 1885.

The manuscript is now housed at the Bibliothèque nationale de France (Suppl. Gr. 919) in Paris.

== See also ==
- List of New Testament minuscules
- Biblical manuscript
- Textual criticism
- Minuscule 750
