= Minuscule 716 =

- New Testament manuscript
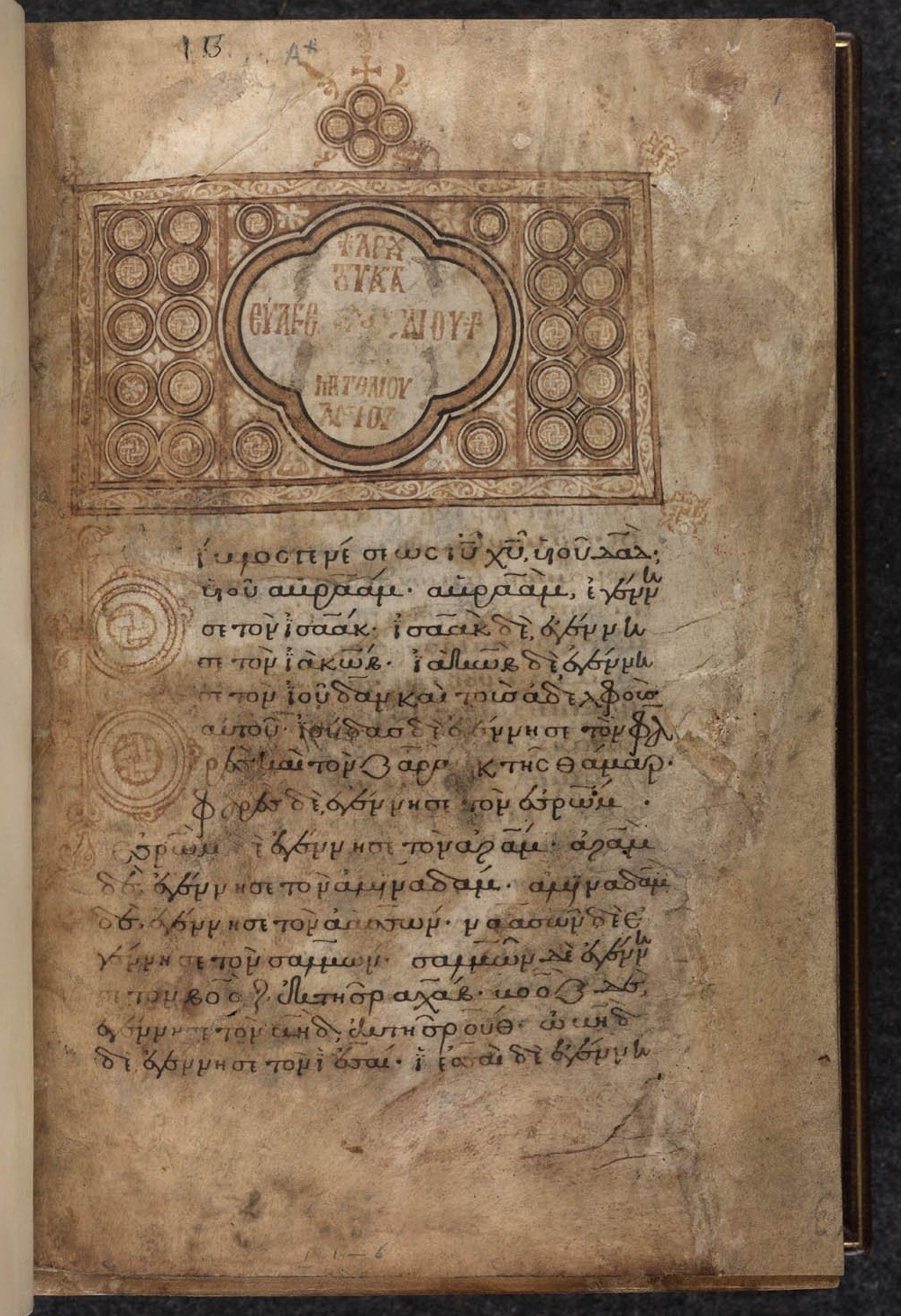
- The first page of Matthew
- Text: Gospels
- Date: 14th century
- Script: Greek
- Now at: British Library
- Size: 21.5 cm by 15 cm
- Type: mixed/Byzantine
- Category: none
- Note: –

Minuscule 716 (in the Gregory-Aland numbering), ε448 (von Soden), is a Greek minuscule manuscript of the New Testament, on parchment. Palaeographically it has been assigned to the 14th century. The manuscript is in the British Library as Egerton MS 2784. The manuscript has complex contents. Scrivener labelled it as 565^{e}.

== Description ==
The codex contains the text of the four Gospels, on 176 parchment leaves (size 21.5 cm by 15 cm).

The text is written in one column per page, 24-26 lines per page. The manuscript has ornamented headpieces, the initial letters in brown with pen-work decoration, the initial for Epsilon has anthropomorphic motif with a blessing hand. The decorations do not use colours.

The text is divided according to the κεφαλαια (chapters), whose numbers are given at the margin of the text, and their τιτλοι (titles) are given at the top of the pages. The lists of the κεφαλαια (tables of contents) are placed before each Gospel. The text is also divided according to the smaller Ammonian Sections (in Mark 242 sections), whose numbers are given at the margin, with references to the Eusebian Canons.

It contains lectionary markings margin (incipits), αναγνωσεις (lessons) at the margin, Synaxarion (fragment), subscriptions at the end of the Gospels, ρηματα, and στιχοι.

== Text ==
The Greek text of the codex is mixed with numerous Byzantine element. Kurt Aland did not place it in any Category.

According to the Claremont Profile Method it creates textual cluster with minuscule 343 in Luke 1 and Luke 10. In Luke 20 it creates cluster with minuscule 686. Textually it is close to the textual family K^{x}.

== History ==
Scrivener dated the manuscript to the 12th century, Dean Burgon to the 13th century, Gregory dated it to the 14th century. Currently the manuscript is dated by the INTF to the 14th century.

Formerly the manuscript belonged to Bernard Quaritch, then it was held in Sotheby's. It belonged to Burgon and Rose. It was bought for the British Museum in 1893 (along with minuscule 714 and 715).

It was added to the list of New Testament manuscripts by Scrivener (565) and Gregory (716). Gregory saw the manuscript in 1883. The text was collated by Rose.

Burgon examined and described the manuscript in the Guardian from July 19, 1882.

== See also ==
- List of New Testament minuscules
- Biblical manuscript
- Textual criticism
