= Minuscule 726 =

- New Testament manuscript
- Text: Gospels
- Date: 13th century
- Script: Greek
- Now at: Royal Library of Belgium
- Size: 20.5 cm by 15 cm
- Type: Byzantine text-type/mixed
- Category: none
- Note: –

Minuscule 726 (in the Gregory-Aland numbering), ε384 (von Soden), is a Greek minuscule manuscript of the New Testament written on parchment. Palaeographically it has been assigned to the 13th century. The manuscript is lacunose. Scrivener labelled it as 882^{e}.

== Description ==
The codex contains the text of the four Gospels on 250 parchment leaves (size 20.5 cm by 15 cm), with lacuna in Matthew 20:17-24:41.

The text is written in single column per page, 23 lines per page.

The text is divided according to the κεφαλαια (chapters), with their τιτλοι (titles of chapters) at the top. There is also a division according to the smaller Ammonian Sections, but without references to the Eusebian Canons.

It contains pictures and some Armenian notes (later hand).

== Text ==
The Greek text of the codex is a representative of the Byzantine text-type. Aland did not place it in any Category.

According to the Claremont Profile Method it represents the textual family Πb in Luke 1, Luke 10, and Luke 20.

== History ==
Gregory dated the manuscript to the 13th century. The manuscript is currently dated by the INTF to the 13th century.

It was written in the same scriptorium as minuscule 435.

Formerly it belonged to Franciscan in Paris.

It was added to the list of New Testament manuscripts by Scrivener (882) and Gregory (726). Gregory saw the manuscript in 1891.

The manuscript is now housed at the Royal Library of Belgium (11375) in Brussels.

== See also ==
- List of New Testament minuscules
- Biblical manuscript
- Textual criticism
