= Minuscule 763 =

- New Testament manuscript
- Text: Gospels
- Date: 14th century
- Script: Greek
- Now at: National Library of Greece
- Size: 21.5 cm by 15 cm
- Type: Byzantine text-type
- Category: V
- Note: —

Minuscule 763 (in the Gregory-Aland numbering), ε539 (von Soden), is a Greek minuscule manuscript of the New Testament written on parchment. Palaeographically it has been assigned to the 14th century. The manuscript has complex contents. Scrivener labelled it as 854^{e}.

== Description ==
The codex contains the text of the four Gospels, on 324 parchment leaves (size 21.5 cm by 15 cm). The text is written in one column per page, 21 lines per page. The texts of Matthew 1:1-13:46; Luke 2:37-5:1 were supplied by a later hand on paper.

The text is divided according to the κεφαλαια (chapters), whose numbers are given at the margin, but there is no their τιτλοι (titles) at the top of the pages.

It contains tables of the κεφαλαια (tables of contents) with a harmony, lectionary markings at the margin, incipits, αναγνωσεις (lessons), and pictures. Lectionary books with hagiographies Synaxarion and Menologion were added by a 15th-century hand.

== Text ==
The Greek text of the codex is a representative of the Byzantine text-type. Hermann von Soden classified it to the textual family K^{r}. Aland placed it in Category V.

According to the Claremont Profile Method it represents textual family K^{r} in Luke 1 and Luke 20. In Luke 10 no profile was made. It creates textual cluster 763.

The text of the Pericope Adutlerae (John 7:53-8:11) is marked by an obelus.

== History ==
Scrivener dated the manuscript to the 15th century; Gregory dated the manuscript to the 14th century. The manuscript is currently dated by the INTF to the 14th century.

In 1843 the manuscript was brought from the monastery of St. George in Locris to Athens, along with 762.

It was added to the list of New Testament manuscripts by Scrivener (854) and Gregory (763). Gregory saw the manuscript in 1886.

The manuscript is now housed at the National Library of Greece (156) in Athens.

== See also ==
- List of New Testament minuscules
- Biblical manuscript
- Textual criticism
- Minuscule 762
