= Minuscule 759 =

- New Testament manuscript
- Text: Gospels
- Date: 13th century
- Script: Greek
- Now at: National Library of Greece
- Size: 21 cm by 14 cm
- Type: Byzantine text-type
- Category: V
- Note: lacks John 8:3-11 marginalia

Minuscule 759 (in the Gregory-Aland numbering), ε397 (von Soden), is a Greek minuscule manuscript of the New Testament written on parchment. Palaeographically it has been assigned to the 13th century. The manuscript has complex contents. Scrivener labelled it as 848^{e}. It has marginalia.

== Description ==
The codex contains the text of the four Gospels, on 295 parchment leaves (size 21 cm by 14 cm). The text is written in one column per page, 23-24 lines per page.

The text is divided according to the κεφαλαια (chapters), whose numbers are given at the margin, and their τιτλοι (titles) at the top of the pages. There is also another division according to the smaller Ammonian Sections, with references to the Eusebian Canons (written below Ammonian Section numbers).

It contains the Epistula ad Carpianum, Eusebian tables, Prolegomena of Theophylact, tables of the κεφαλαια (tables of contents), lectionary markings at the margin, incipits, Synaxarion, Menologion, subscriptions at the end of each Gospel, αναγνωσεις (lessons), and pictures.

== Text ==
The Greek text of the codex is a representative of the Byzantine text-type. Hermann von Soden classified it to the textual family K^{x}. Aland placed it in Category V.

According to the Claremont Profile Method it represents textual family K^{x} in Luke 1 and Luke 20. In Luke 10 no profile was made.

It contains the beginning of the Pericope Adulterae (John 7:53-8:2) without verses 8:3-11.

== History ==
Scrivener dated the manuscript to the 13th century; Gregory dated the manuscript to the 13th or 14th century. The manuscript is currently dated by the INTF to the 13th century.

In 1870 it was presented to one Nicholas from Athens.

It was added to the list of New Testament manuscripts by Scrivener (848) and Gregory (759). Gregory saw the manuscript in 1886.

The manuscript is now housed at the National Library of Greece (152) in Athens.

== See also ==
- List of New Testament minuscules
- Biblical manuscript
- Textual criticism
- Minuscule 758
