= Minuscule 769 =

- New Testament manuscript
- Text: Gospels
- Date: 14th century
- Script: Greek
- Now at: National Library of Greece
- Size: 21.5 cm by 15 cm
- Type: Byzantine text-type
- Category: V
- Note: —

Minuscule 769 (in the Gregory-Aland numbering), ε540 (von Soden), is a Greek minuscule manuscript of the New Testament written on paper. Palaeographically it has been assigned to the 14th century. The manuscript has complex contents. Scrivener labelled it as 861^{e}.

== Description ==
The codex contains the text of the four Gospels, on 253 paper leaves (size 21.5 cm by 15 cm). The text of Matthew 1:1-15 was supplied by a later hand. The text is written in one column per page, 24 lines per page.

The text is divided according to the κεφαλαια (chapters), whose numbers are given at the margin, with their τιτλοι (titles) at the top of the pages.

It contains Argumentum (explanation of using Eusebian Canons), tables of the κεφαλαια before each Gospel, Lectionary markings at the margin, incipits, αναγνωσεις (lessons), and subscriptions at the end of each Gospel. Liturgical books with hagiographies (Synaxarion and Menologion) were supplied in the 15th century.

== Text ==
The Greek text of the codex is a representative of the Byzantine text-type. Hermann von Soden classified it to the textual family K^{r}. Aland placed it in Category V.

According to the Claremont Profile Method it represents textual family K^{r} in Luke 1 and Luke 20. In Luke 10 no profile was made. It belongs to the subgroup 35 (lacks reading 37 in Luke 1).

The text of the Pericope Adulterae (John 7:53-8:11) is marked by an obelus.

== History ==
F. H. A. Scrivener dated the manuscript to the 15th century; C. R. Gregory dated the manuscript to the 14th century. The manuscript is currently dated by the INTF to the 14th century.

The manuscript was brought εκ των κατα την Μηλον διαλυθεντων μονυδριων in 1834. It was noticed in catalogue from 1876.

It was added to the list of New Testament manuscripts by Scrivener (861) and Gregory (769). Gregory saw the manuscript in 1886.

The manuscript is now housed at the National Library of Greece (162) in Athens.

== See also ==
- List of New Testament minuscules
- Biblical manuscript
- Textual criticism
- Minuscule 768
