= Minuscule 720 =

- New Testament manuscript
- Text: Gospel, Catholic epistles, Pauline epistles
- Date: 1138/1139
- Script: Greek
- Now at: Austrian National Library
- Size: 29.9 cm by 22 cm
- Type: mixed
- Category: III
- Note: –

Minuscule 720 (in the Gregory-Aland numbering), Θ^{ε20} (von Soden), is a Greek minuscule manuscript of the New Testament, on paper. It is dated by a colophon to the year 1138 or 1139. The manuscript has complex contents. Scrivener labelled it as 825^{e}.

== Description ==
The codex contains the text of the New Testament except Book of Acts and Apocalypse, on 296 (118 + 178) paper leaves (size 29.9 cm by 22 cm).

The text is written in one column per page, 56 lines per page.

It contains a Theophylact's commentary to the Gospels.

The order of books is unusual: Mark, John, Matthew, the Catholic epistles, Luke, and the Pauline epistles. Epistle to the Hebrews is placed after Philemon, Romans and 1-2 Corinthians after Hebrews.

== Text ==
The Greek text of the codex is mixed. Kurt Aland placed it in Category III.

It was not examined by using Claremont Profile Method.

== History ==
According to the colophon it was written in 1138 or 1139, by Leo, a monk.

The manuscript once belonged to John Sambucky.

It was added to the list of New Testament manuscripts by Scrivener (825) and Gregory (720^{e} for the Gospels, 258^{a} for the Catholic epistles, 308^{p} for the Pauline epistles). Gregory saw the manuscript in 1887.

At present the manuscript is housed at the Austrian National Library (Theol. gr. 79. 80) in Vienna.

== See also ==
- List of New Testament minuscules
- Biblical manuscript
- Textual criticism
