= Minuscule 745 =

- New Testament manuscript
- Text: Gospels
- Date: 16th century
- Script: Greek
- Now at: Bibliothèque nationale de France
- Size: 24.6 cm by 17.5 cm
- Type: Byzantine text-type
- Category: V
- Note: rewritten from 732

Minuscule 745 (in the Gregory-Aland numbering), ε605 (von Soden), is a Greek minuscule manuscript of the New Testament written on paper. Palaeographically it has been assigned to the 16th century. The manuscript has complex contents. Scrivener labelled it as 633^{e}.

== Description ==
The codex contains the text of the four Gospels on 212 paper leaves (size 24.6 cm by 17.5 cm). The text is written in one column per page, 22 lines per page.

The text is divided according to the κεφαλαια (chapters), whose numbers are given at the margin, and their τιτλοι (titles of chapters) at the top. There is also another division according to the smaller Ammonian Sections (in Mark 234 Sections, the last section in 16:9), but there are no references to the Eusebian Canons.

== Text ==
The Greek text of the codex is a representative of the Byzantine text-type. Aland placed it in Category V.

It was not examined by using the Claremont Profile Method.

== History ==
Scrivener dated the manuscript to the 16th or 17th century, Martin to the 17th century; Gregory dated it to the 16th century. The manuscript is currently dated by the INTF to the 16th century.

According to Scrivener it is "a Western codex". According to Gregory it could be rewritten from the minuscule 732.

The manuscript was added to the list of New Testament manuscripts by Scrivener (633) and Gregory (745). It was examined and described by Paulin Martin. Gregory saw the manuscript in 1885.

The manuscript is now housed at the Bibliothèque nationale de France (Gr. 227) in Paris.

== See also ==
- List of New Testament minuscules
- Biblical manuscript
- Textual criticism
- Minuscule 744
