= Minuscule 482 =

- New Testament manuscript
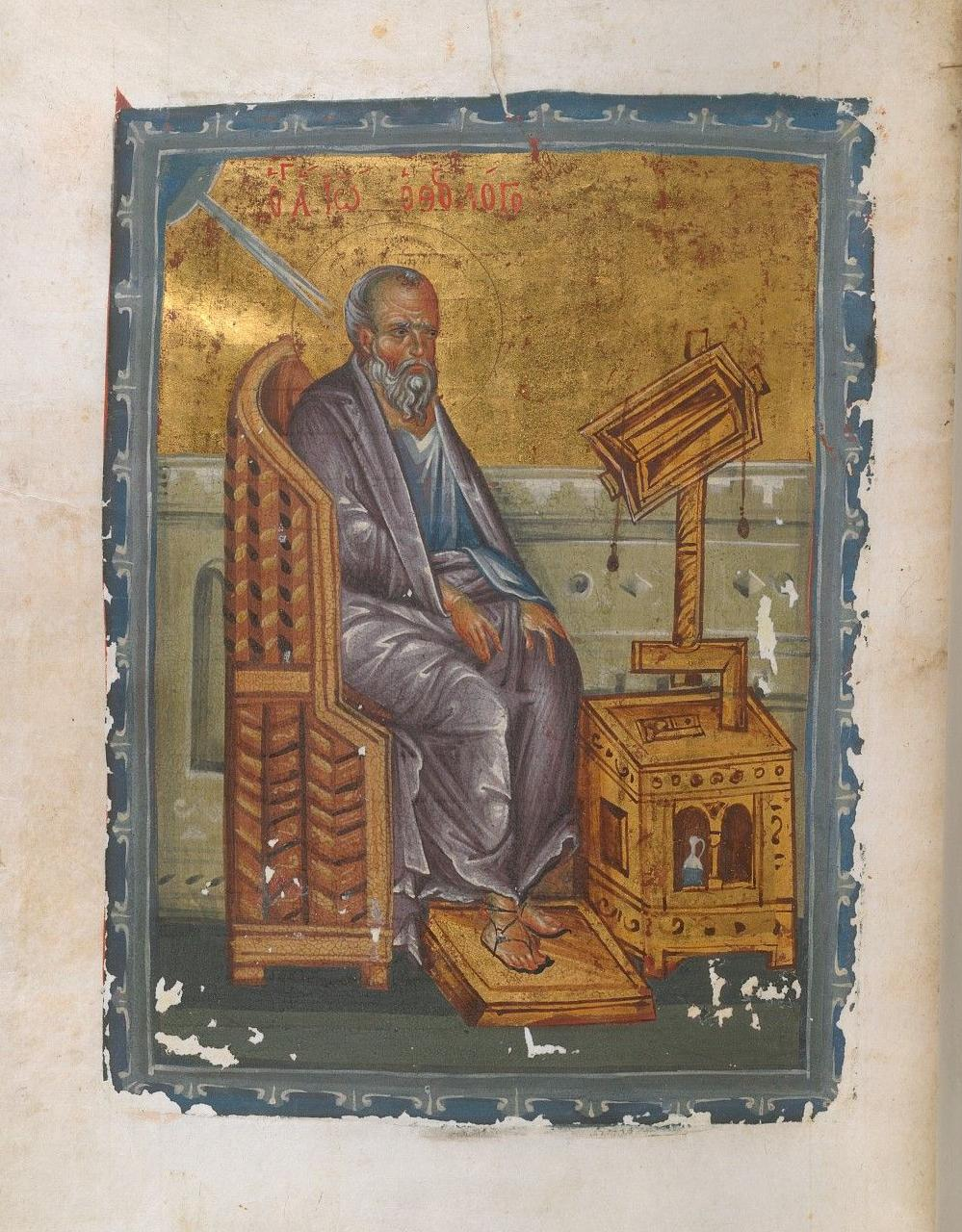
- John Evangelist - folio 226 verso
- Name: Burney MS 20
- Text: Gospels
- Date: 1285
- Script: Greek
- Now at: British Library
- Size: 19 cm by 15.2 cm
- Type: Byzantine text-type
- Category: V
- Hand: Inelegant
- Note: Full marginalia

Minuscule 482 (in the Gregory-Aland numbering), ε 1017 (in the Soden numbering), is a Greek minuscule manuscript of the New Testament, on parchment. It is dated by a colophon to the year 1285 (altered to 985). Scrivener labelled it by number 570. The manuscript has complex context, but faded in parts. The text exhibits more numerous and bolder textual variants than usual manuscripts of the four Gospels. Marginal apparatus is given fully.

The manuscript was written by an inaccurate copyist, who made a large number of errors. Liturgical books, Synaxarion and Menologion, were added by a later hand.

== Description ==
The whole codex contains 317 parchment leaves (size 19 cm by 15.2 cm). The leaves are arranged in small quarto (four leaves in quire). The parchment is fine and thin. It has several paper flying leaves at the beginning and one at the end (folio 318). Folio 318 is a parchment flyleaf.

The codex contains a complete text of the four Gospels on folios 6v-288v, without any lacunae. The manuscript has faded in parts.

The writing is in one column per page, 22-23 lines per page. The margins are wide, the dimensions of text are 14.0 by 9.0 cm. It contains the decorated headpieces (in four colours) and the decorated initial letters at the beginning of each Gospel (folios 7, 91, 143, 227). The large initial letters at the beginning are written in gold and blue, small initials in brown. The titles of the Gospels are written in uncial letters in gold. The breathings and accents are given fully but carelessly written, sometimes varying even in the same verse (e.g. in Luke 3:8). According to Scrivener it was written by "clear but inelegant hand". The nomina sacra are written in an abbreviated way.

The text is divided according to the κεφαλαια (chapters), whose numbers are given at the margin of the text, and their τιτλοι (titles of chapters) at the top of the pages. There is also another division according to the smaller Ammonian Sections, whose numbers are written at the margin, with references to the Eusebian Canons. The references are written below the numbers of the Ammonian Sections. Number of sections is usual.

It contains the Eusebian Canon tables at the beginning (folios 3r-6r), tables of the κεφαλαια (tables of contents) before each Gospel, lectionary markings at the margin (for liturgical use), and portraits of the four Evangelists before each Gospel (Matthew on folio 6 verso, Mark on folio 90 verso, Luke on folio 142 verso, John on folio 226 verso). The Church lessons are marked and the days on which they are used. Each lesson is begins with a capital letter. In result the manuscript was adapted for liturgical use. Synaxarion (table of lessons) and Menologion of Saint days were added by later hand, Synaxarion (ff. 290–317) on parchment, Menologion on paper.

The text of the Gospels has many corrections made by two hands. Corrections were made by the same hand as Synaxarion and Menologion.

N ephelkystikon appears 20 times in Matthew 1–15. There are a few occurrences or the error of itacism, but some of them are unusual (e.g. κοποιωντες in Matthew 11:28, οις for εις in John 6:17). The corrections made by a second hand contain even more itacisms than the original text. It does not mean, however, that the original scribe was accurate copyist.

The original scribe (prima manu) made many errors of homoioteleuton (repetition of endings), and rare grammar forms (e.g. εζητειν in Luke 3:9; εδιδουν in Luke 3:16), transpositions of words, and synonymous words are constantly substituted. There are also many other errors (e.g. incorrect spelling). There are also inconsistencies in spelling, e.g. city Nazareth is spelled in two ways, as ναζαρεθ in John 1:46 and as ναζαρετ in John 1:47; κραββατον in Mark 2 and κραβαττον in John 5. Scrivener stated "the scribe was far from accurate copyist".

== Text ==
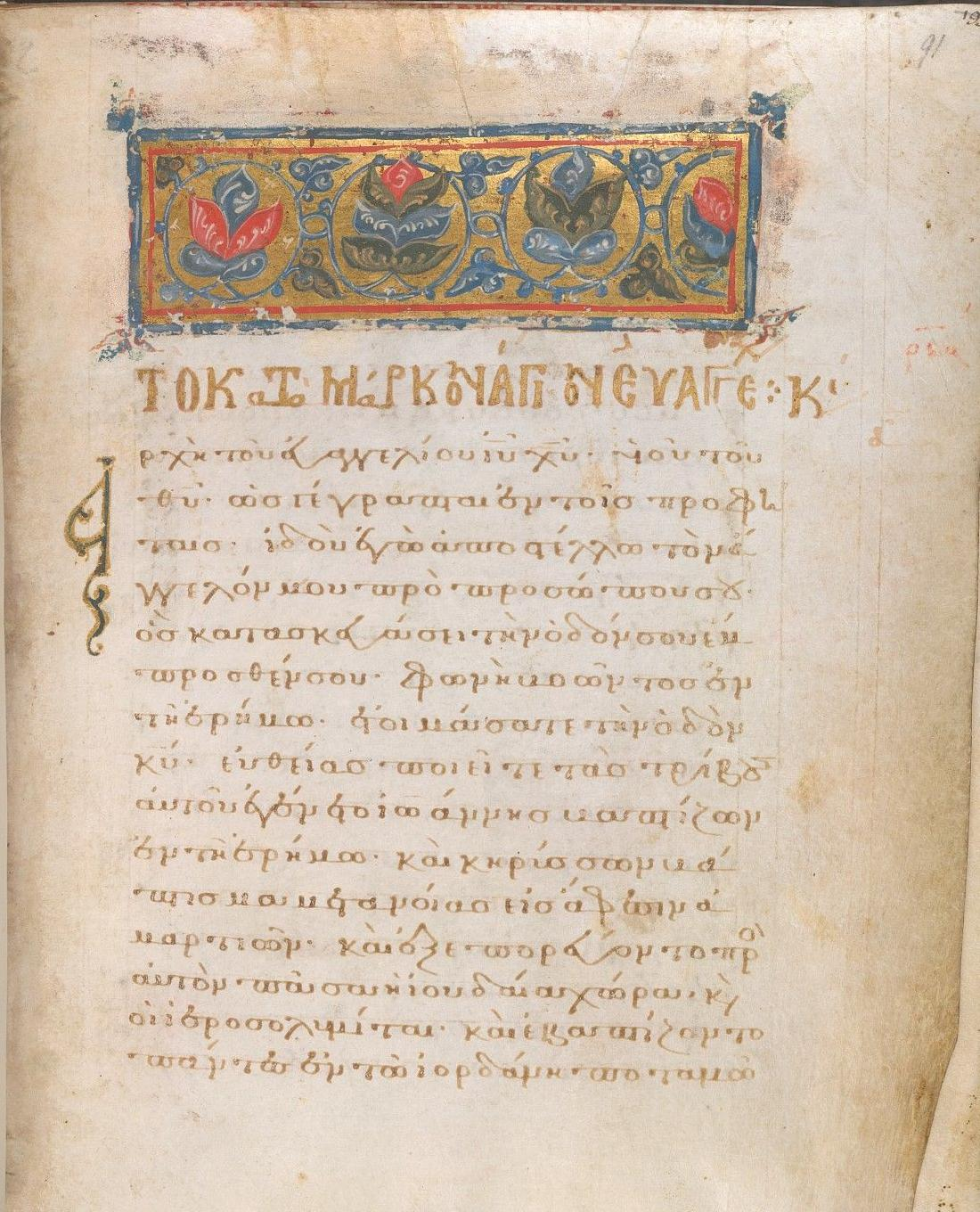
The first page of the Gospel of Mark

The Greek text of the codex is a representative of the Byzantine text-type. Hermann von Soden classified it to the family I^{kc}. Kurt Aland placed it in Category V. According to the Claremont Profile Method it represents the textual family K^{x} in Luke 1. In Luke 10 and Luke 20 it belongs to the family Π^{a}.

Although it has element of the family Π usually it is not classified as a member of that family, as it has also some K^{x} element.

It has many singular and unusual readings. Scrivener gave a list of the singular readings of the codex: Matthew 7:18; 8:22; 10:30; 15:23; 17:25; 22:6; 25:17; 26:7.10.22; 27:7; Mark 1:16; 5:35.38; 7:18; 8:7; 10:29; 13:27; Luke 1:21.75; 4:24; 5:5; 6:15.16; 7:11; 8:32; 10:32; 11:52; 14:32; 16:25; 18:32; 22:64; John 2:11; 4:21.39.42; 10:12; 13:24; 14:25; 16:14; 17:4; 18:20. In Mark 13:27 it has unusual additional reading αγγελους μου μετα σαλπιγγος φωνης μεγαλης (angels with a loud trumpet call), the reading was derived from Matthew 24:31 (angels with a loud trumpet call), and does not occur in any other manuscript. It has addition in Luke 6:16 (και λεμβαιον ητοι θαδδαιον).

In some passages codex agrees with the oldest uncial manuscripts (e.g. Matthew 1:6.10; 5:16; 6:19; 7:13.14; etc.), like Codex Vaticanus, Codex Ephraemi, Codex Bezae, Codex Cyprius, Codex Regius, Codex Campianus, and Codex Dublinensis. According to F. H. A. Scrivener it is close textually to minuscule 489, which belongs to Π^{a}.

Singular readings

The words before the brackets are the readings of Textus Receptus, the words after the brackets are the readings of the codex.

Matthew 7:18 – σαπρον (bad) ] πονηρον (evil)
Matthew 8:22 – αφες τους νεκρους ] αφες τοις νεκροις
Matthew 10:30 – της κεφαλης πασαι ηριθμημεναι ] πασαι της κεφαλης απηριθμημεναι
Matthew 15:23 – αυτη ] αυτης
Matthew 17:25 – αυτον ] αυτους
Matthew 22:6 – υβρισαν (insulted) ] εδειραν (beat)
Matthew 25:17 – δυο ] δυο ταλαντα
Matthew 26:7 – κατεχεεν ] κατεεχεν αυτο
Matthew 26:10 – ειργασατο ] εποιησεν
Matthew 26:22 – λυπουμενοι ] λυπουμενος
Matthew 27:7 – τον ] omit
Mark 1:16 – βαλλοντας ] βαλλοντος
Mark 5:35 – ερχονται ] ερχεται
Mark 5:35 – λεγοντες ] λεγοντος
Mark 5:38 – κλαιοντας και αλαλαζοντας ] κλαιοντα και αλαλαζοντα
Mark 7:18 – ουτως ] οντος
Mark 8:7 – ειπεν ] ειχεν
Mark 10:29 – ευαγγελιου ] ευαγγελιου μου
Mark 13:27 – αγγελους μου ] αγγελους μου μετα σαλπιγγος φωνης μεγαλης
Luke 1:21 – χρονιζειν ] εγχρονιζειν
Luke 1:75 – ημων ] αυτου
Luke 5:5 – χαλασω ] χαλασωμεν
Luke 6:15.16 – και σιμωνα τον καλουμενον ζηλωτην και ιουδαν ιακωβου και ιουδαν ισκαριωτην ] και τον και κανανιτην σιμωνα τον καλουμενον ζηλωτην και ιουδαν τον και λεμβαιον ητοι θαδδαιον ιακωβου και ιουδαν ισκαριωτην
Luke 7:11 – επορευθη ] πορευεσθαι
Luke 8:32 – εκει ] εκεισε
Luke 10:32 – ελθων ] omit
Luke 11:52 – εισερχομενους ] εισελθειν
Luke 14:32 – προς ] εις
Luke 16:25 – ομοιως ] omit
Luke 18:32 – γαρ ] γαρ εν
Luke 22:64 – αυτον ετυπτον ] omit
John 2:11 – την αρχην των σημειων ] των σημειων την αρχην
John 4:21 – προσκυνησετε ] προσκυνησεσθε
John 4:39 – εις αυτον ] omit
John 4:42 – οιδαμεν ] οιδαμεν και εγνωκαμεν
John 10:12 – τα προβατα ] omit
John 13:24 – τουτω ] αυτω
John 14:25 – υμιν ] omit
John 16:14 – εμε ] εμοι
John 16:14 – οτι ] το
John 16:14 – αναγγελει ] αναγγελη
John 17:4 – επι της γης ] omit
John 18:20 – τω κοσμω ] εν τω κοσμω

Old-Byzantine readings

Matthew 1:6 – ο βασιλευς is omitted as in codices 𝔓^{1}, Sinaiticus, Vaticanus, 036, f^{1}, f^{13}, 700
Matthew 1:10 it reads Αμως (as א, B, C, Γ, Δ, Θ, f^{1}, 33), the majority reads Αμων (L, W, f^{13}, the Byzantine text, Textus Receptus).
Matthew 5:16 – ιδωσιν υμων τα καλα εργα ] ιδωσι τα καλα υμων εργα
Matthew 7:13 – εισερχομενοι ] ερχομενοι
Matthew 7:14 – τι ] οτι
Matthew 26:7 – βαρυτιμου ] πολυτιμου

== History ==
There is a colophon on the page 592, which states: ετελειωθη κατα τον μαιον μηνα εις τας τριακοντα (?) ημερα τεταρτη της ενισταμενης ετους ςψζγ ινδικτ ιγ followed by a few iambics with name of scribe. It means, the manuscript was written on 30 May of the year 6793 of the era of Constantinople (i.e. 1285). This date was changed by a later hand. Scrivener stated: "some silly person has changed the Ψ into Υ (very awkwardly), which would throw it back to A.D. 985." The name of scribe was Theophilus, a monk.

The place of origin of the codex is unknown. It is believed that Constantinople can be possible place of its origin. On the folio 7 there is erased Greek inscription from the 16th century.

The manuscript once belonged to Charles Burney, classical scholar, along with codices: Minuscule 480, 481, 484, 485, and ℓ 184. It is unknown how Burney acquired the manuscript, but after his death it was proved that he had stolen some manuscripts from the university library in Cambridge. After his death it was purchased for the British Museum in 1818 from his son Charles Parr Burney. The manuscript was rebound in 1964.

The manuscript was examined and collated by Scrivener, who published its text in 1852. The manuscript was added to the list of New Testament manuscripts by Scrivener (570) and C. R. Gregory (482). Gregory saw it in 1883.

It is currently housed at the British Library (Burney MS 20) in London.

== See also ==
- List of New Testament minuscules
- Biblical manuscript
- Textual criticism
