= Minuscule 412 =

- New Testament manuscript
- Text: Gospels
- Date: 1301
- Script: Greek
- Now at: Biblioteca Marciana
- Size: 17.7 cm by 13 cm
- Type: Byzantine text-type
- Category: V
- Note: marginalia

Minuscule 412 (in the Gregory-Aland numbering), ε 419 (in Soden's numbering), is a Greek minuscule manuscript of the New Testament, on parchment. It is dated by a colophon to the year 1301. It has marginalia.

== Description ==
The codex contains a complete text of the four Gospels on 329 parchment leaves (17.7 cm by 13 cm). The text is written in one column per page, in 22 lines per page.

The text is divided according to the κεφαλαια (chapters), whose numbers are given at the margin, and their τιτλοι (titles) at the top of the pages. There is also a division according to the Ammonian Sections (in Mark 241 Sections, the last in 16:9), with references to the Eusebian Canons (written below Ammonian Section numbers).

It contains the Epistula ad Carpianum, Eusebian Canon tables, Prolegomena, tables of the κεφαλαια (tables of contents) before each Gospel, Synaxarion, Menologion, and numbers of στιχοι.

John 1:1-14 was supplied by a later hand.

== Text ==
The Greek text of the codex is a representative of the Byzantine text-type. Aland placed it in Category V. According to the Claremont Profile Method it represents textual family K^{x} in Luke 1, Luke 10, and Luke 20. It belongs also to the cluster 1394.

According to Gregory its text is similar to the manuscripts 483 and 484.

== History ==
The manuscript was written by Theodoros Hagiopetrites (as codex 74), a scribe. Wiedmann and J. G. J. Braun collated some portions of the manuscript for Scholz (1794-1852). The manuscript was added to the list of New Testament manuscripts by Scholz. C. R. Gregory saw it in 1886.

The manuscript is currently housed at the Biblioteca Marciana (Gr. I. 19) in Venice.

== See also ==
- List of New Testament minuscules
- Biblical manuscript
- Textual criticism
