= Minuscule 266 =

- New Testament manuscript
- Text: Gospels
- Date: 13th century
- Script: Greek
- Found: 1718, Paul Lucas
- Now at: National Library of France
- Size: 24.2 cm by 16.6 cm
- Type: Byzantine text-type
- Category: V
- Note: full marginalia

Minuscule 266 (in the Gregory-Aland numbering), ε 1393 (Soden), is a Greek minuscule manuscript of the New Testament, on parchment. Palaeographically it has been assigned to the 13th century. The manuscript has complex contents. It has full marginalia.

== Description ==
The codex contains the text of the four Gospels on 282 parchment leaves (24.2 cm by 16.6 cm). The text is written in one column per page, in 23 lines per page.

The text is divided according to numbers of the κεφαλαια (chapters) at the margin, and their τιτλοι (titles of chapters) at the top of the pages. There is also a division according to the smaller Ammonian Sections (in Mark 237 sections, the last section in 16:15), but there is no references to the Eusebian Canons.

It contains tables of the κεφαλαια (tables of contents) before each Gospel, lectionary markings at the margin (for liturgical use), synaxaria, Menologion, and subscriptions at the end of each Gospel.

== Text ==
The Greek text of the codex is a representative of the Byzantine text-type. Hermann von Soden suggested that it is related to the textual families Π^{a} and Π^{b}. Aland placed it in Category V. According to the Claremont Profile Method it represents the textual family Π266 in Luke 1 and Luke 20 (close to 593). In Luke 10 no profile was made.

== History ==
The manuscripts was added to the list of New Testament manuscripts by Scholz (1794-1852). It was examined and described by Paulin Martin. C. R. Gregory saw the manuscript in 1885.

The manuscript is currently housed at the Bibliothèque nationale de France (Gr. 67) at Paris.

== See also ==
- List of New Testament minuscules
- Biblical manuscript
- Textual criticism
