= Minuscule 234 =

- New Testament manuscript
- Name: Codex Havniensis I
- Text: New Testament (except Rev.)
- Date: 1278
- Script: Greek
- Found: 1699
- Now at: Det Kongelige Bibliotek
- Size: 25.5 cm by 19 cm
- Type: Byzantine text-type
- Category: none
- Note: unusual order of books

Minuscule 234 (in the Gregory-Aland numbering), δ 365 (Soden), is a Greek minuscule manuscript of the New Testament, on parchment. It is dated by a colophon to the year 1278. It has liturgical books and marginalia.

== Description ==
The codex contains entire text of the New Testament (except Apocalypse), on 315 thick parchment leaves (size 25.5 cm by 19 cm). The text is written in two columns per page, 35 lines per page, in black ink, the capital letters in red. The order of books is unusual, the same as in codex 51: Acts, Pauline epistles, Catholic epistles, Gospels.

The text is divided according to κεφαλαια (chapters), whose numbers are given at the margin, the τιτλοι (titles) at the top. The text of the Gospels has also a division according to the smaller Ammonian Sections (Matthew 359, Mark 241, Luke 342, John 232), with references to the Eusebian Canons.

It contains Prolegomena to the four Gospels, Epistula ad Carpianum, the Eusebian Canon tables, tables of the κεφαλαια (tables of contents) before each Gospel, lectionary markings at the margin (for liturgical use), incipits, liturgical books with hagiographies (Synaxarion and Menologion), Verses in Matthew and Mark, Euthalian Apparatus in the Catholic epistles, Hebrews has three Prolegomena. The text has many corrections.

== Text ==
The Greek text of the codex is a representative of the Byzantine text-type. Aland did not place it in any Category. According to the Claremont Profile Method it represents the textual family K^{x} in Luke 1 and Luke 20. In Luke 10 no profile was made. It belongs to the textual cluster 74.

== History ==
The manuscript is one of several copies written by Theodore Hagiopetrites (as codex 74, 412, and others). It was bought at Venice by Friedrich Rostgaard in 1699. It was examined by Hensler, Birch, Delitzsch, Graux, and C. R. Gregory (1891).

It is currently housed at the Det Kongelige Bibliotek (GkS 1322, 4) at Copenhagen.

== See also ==
- List of New Testament minuscules
- Biblical manuscript
- Textual criticism
