= Minuscule 481 =

- New Testament manuscript
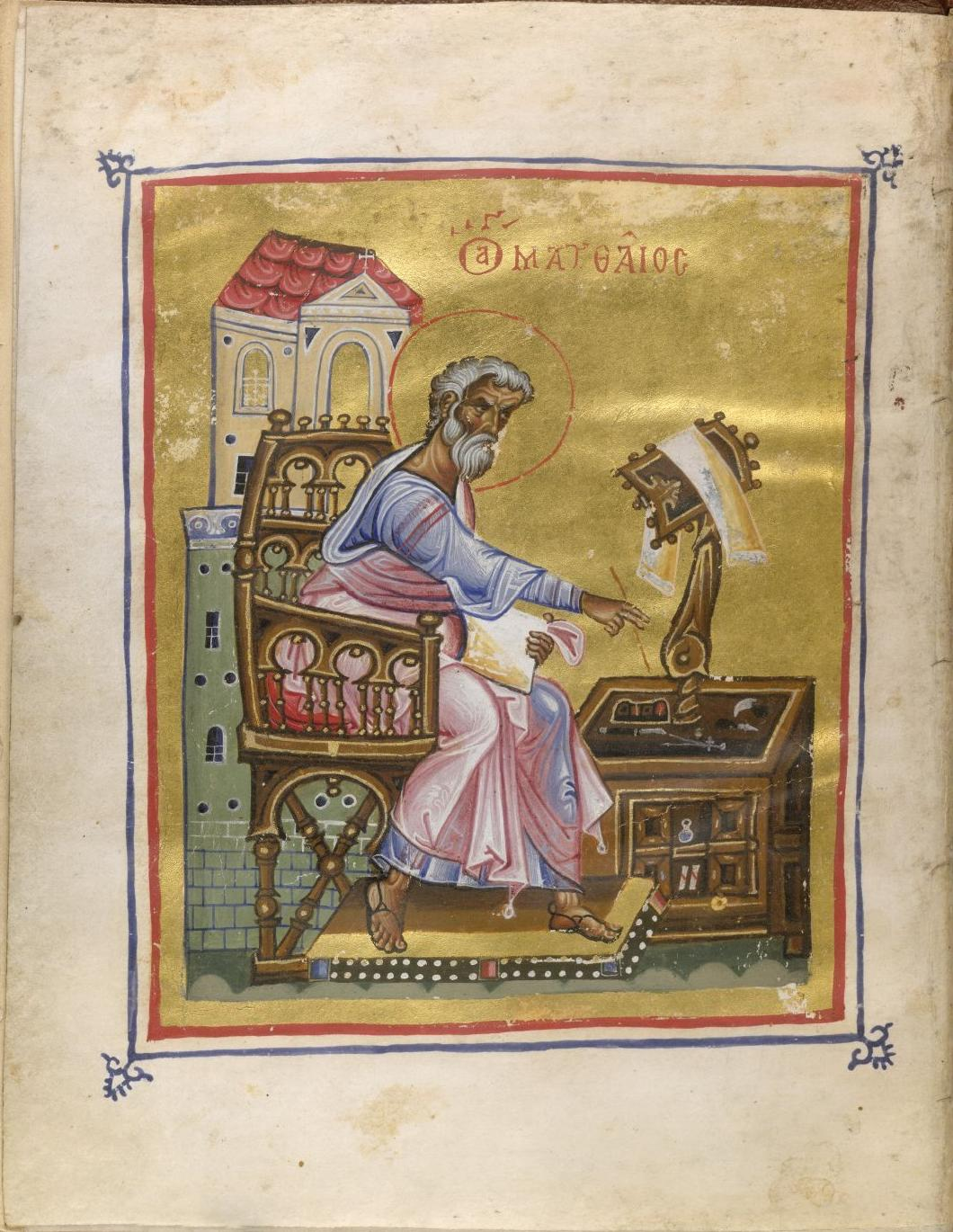
- Folio 1 verso, portrait of Matthew Evangelist
- Text: Gospels
- Date: 2nd half of the 10th-century
- Script: Greek
- Now at: British Library
- Size: 22.4 cm by 17.7 cm
- Type: Byzantine text-type
- Category: V
- Note: elegant copy

Minuscule 481 (in the Gregory-Aland numbering), ε 1017 (in the Soden numbering), is a Greek minuscule manuscript of the New Testament, on parchment. Palaeographically it has been assigned to the 10th-century. Scrivener labeled it by number 569. The manuscript has complex contents.

== Description ==
The codex contains the text of the four Gospels on 218 parchment leaves (size 22.4 cm by 17.7 cm). It is written in one column per page, 22 lines per page. It is clean and elegant copy; before each Gospel is a picture of its writer, of no very high order of art, but curious enough. The half page of writing erased at the end of the Gospel of John.

It is one of the very few manuscripts that are destitute of Liturgical apparatus. The style of the handwriting is unformed, the absence of all notes, κεφαλαια (chapters), etc. The only traces of which are red capitals in the marginal mark at John 13:31. The breathings and accents are complete and tolerably correct. There is no ι subscriptum but ι adscriptum in Mark 14:14; John 5:22 and in few other places. Itacisms are more frequent than in Codex 470. Erasures and corrections by a later hand exist, but are not very frequent. One of the most remarkable errors of scribe Scrivener noticed in Mark 2:12 and Mark 6:55 – κραβατγον (instead of κραβαττον).

Two inscriptions state that it belonged in 1809 to the Library of St. Laurence in the Escurial.

It contains portraits of Evangelists.

== Text ==
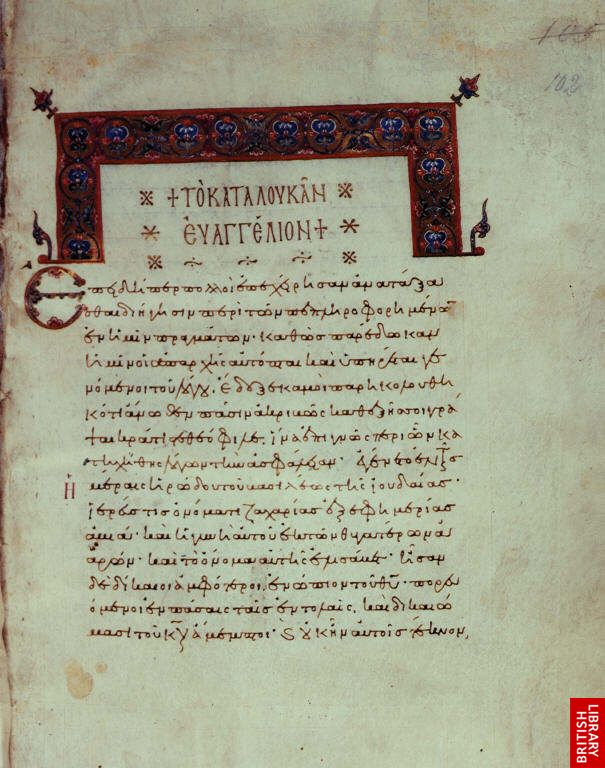
Beginning of Luke (1:1-7a), folio 102

The Greek text of the codex is a representative of the Byzantine text-type. Hermann von Soden classified it to the textual family I^{κ} (Family Π). Aland placed it in Category V. According to the Claremont Profile Method it represents the textual family K^{x} in Luke 10 and Luke 20. In Luke 1 it belongs to the family Π^{a}.

The text of Luke 22:43.44 is marked by an obelus (÷).

== History ==
Currently it is dated by the INTF to the 10th-century.

The manuscript was held in Escorial, then it belonged to Charles Burney, as codices 480, 482, 484, 485, and ℓ 184. It was purchased for the British Museum in 1818.

The manuscript was examined and collated by Scrivener, who published its text in 1852. The manuscript was added to the list of New Testament manuscripts by Scrivener (569). Gregory gave number 481 to it. Gregory saw it in 1883.

It is currently housed at the British Library (Burney 19) in London.

== See also ==
- List of New Testament minuscules
- Biblical manuscript
- Textual criticism
