= Minuscule 593 =

- New Testament manuscript
- Text: Gospels †
- Date: 13th century
- Script: Greek
- Now at: Biblioteca Marciana
- Size: 24.5 cm by 17.5 cm
- Type: Byzantine text-type
- Category: V
- Note: marginalia

Minuscule 593 (in the Gregory-Aland numbering), ε 319 (von Soden), is a Greek minuscule manuscript of the New Testament, on parchment. Palaeographically it has been assigned to the 13th century. The manuscript is lacunose. It was labelled by Scrivener as 462. It has marginalia.

== Description ==
The codex contains the text of the Mark 1:44-Luke 24:53; John 1:15-11:13 on 153 parchment leaves (size 24.5 cm by 17.5 cm) with lacunae. It is written in one column per page, 22 lines per page.

It contains lists of the κεφαλαια are given before each of the Gospels, numerals of the κεφαλαια are placed at the margin, the τιτλοι at the top. There is also a division according to the Ammonian Sections (in Mark 237 Sections - the last in 16:15), but without a references to the Eusebian Canons. It contains lectionary markings, and incipits.

== Text ==
The Greek text of the codex is a representative of the Byzantine text-type. Hermann von Soden suggested that it is related to the textual families Π^{a} and Π^{b}.

Aland placed it in Category V. According to Claremont Profile Method it represents the textual family Π266 in Luke 1, Luke 10, and Luke 20.

== History ==
It was wrongly called an Evangelistarium in the Supplementary Catalogue.

The manuscript was added to the list of New Testament manuscripts by Scrivener. It was examined by Dean Burgon.

The manuscript currently is housed at the Biblioteca Marciana (Gr. I,58 (1214)), at Venice.

== See also ==
- List of New Testament minuscules
- Biblical manuscript
- Textual criticism
