= Minuscule 582 =

- New Testament manuscript
- Text: New Testament
- Date: 1334
- Script: Greek
- Now at: Biblioteca Comunale Ariostea
- Size: 40.3 cm by 30 cm
- Type: Byzantine / mixed
- Category: none

Minuscule 582 (in the Gregory-Aland numbering), δ 410 (von Soden), is a Greek minuscule manuscript of the Greek Bible of the Old Testament and New Testament, on paper. Dated by a colophon to the year 1334. The manuscript has complex contents. It was labelled by Scrivener as 451.

== Description ==
The codex contains the entire of the New Testament on 114 paper leaves (size 40.3 cm by 30 cm). It is written in one column per page, 39 lines per page. It contains lists of the κεφαλαια, Latin κεφαλαια (chapters) are designated by Greek letters, τιτλοι (titles), Ammonian sections (in Mark 234 - 16:9), lectionary markings, incipits, Synaxarion (Latin Synaxarion added by a later hand), and Menologion.

The order of books: Gospels, Pauline epistles, Acts of the Apostles, Catholic epistles, and Apocalypse.

The manuscript contains also the Old Testament, according to Septuaginta on 1-3 volumes. The text of the New Testament is included to 4th volume.

== Text ==
The Greek text of the codex is a mixture of text-types with a predominate the Byzantine element. Aland did not place it in any Category. According to Claremont Profile Method it represents the textual family Π200 in Luke 1 and Π^{b} Luke 20. In Luke 10 its text is illegible, in result no profile was made.

== History ==
The manuscript was written by Nicodemus. It was examined by Dean Burgon. It was added to the list of New Testament manuscripts by Frederick Henry Ambrose Scrivener. The text of the Apocalypse was collated by Herman C. Hoskier and edited by him in 1929.

The manuscript currently housed in at the Biblioteca Comunale Ariostea (CI. II, 187, III), at Ferrara.

== See also ==
- List of New Testament minuscules
- Biblical manuscript
- Textual criticism
