= Biblioteca Comunale Ariostea =

Coordinates: 44°49′58″N 11°37′18″E

The Biblioteca Comunale Ariostea is located in the Palazzo Paradiso in central Ferrara, region of Emilia-Romagna, Italy. It was named Ariostea, because the collection contains manuscripts related to the author, and within the palace also lies the tomb of Ludovico Ariosto.

== History ==
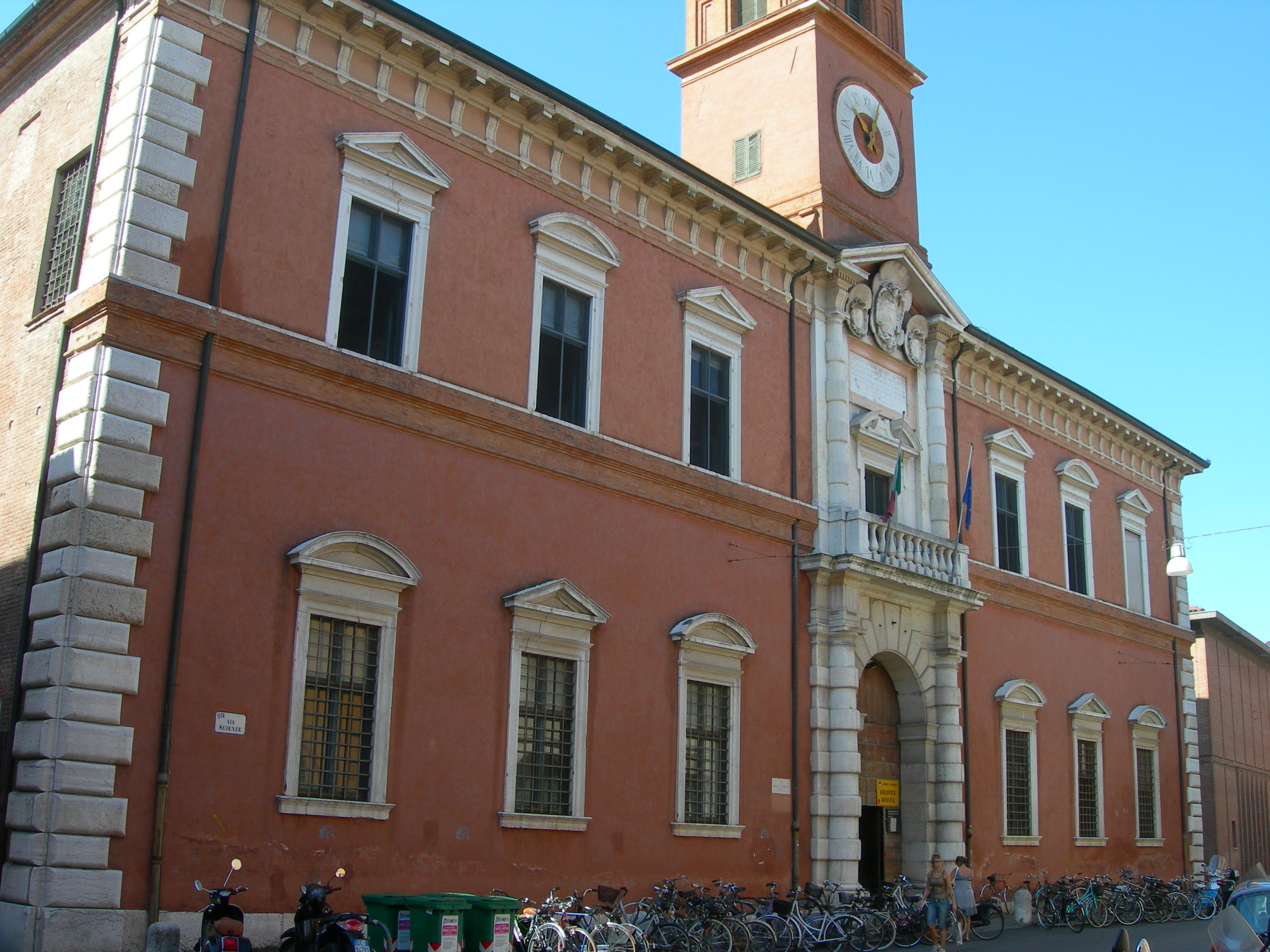
Palazzo Paradiso

The Palazzo Paradiso was built in 1391 as a palace of the House of Este. In 1567 the building was leased by Cardinal Ippolito II d'Este for the university faculties; here graduated Paracelsus. In the 17th century as a result of an intervention by Giovan Battista Aleotti was built the clock tower and marble door and the palace received its present appearance.

The library, founded in 1750–1753, and refurbished in 1801 according to a plaque in the reading room, is dedicated to manuscripts and publications related to local writers such as Ariosto, Tasso, Vincenzo Monti, Govoni, Caretti, and Nello Quilici. The collection has nearly 400,000 objects. The library occupies a building adjacent to the Jewish Ghetto of Ferrara. The restored reading room is now dedicated to the bibliophile Giovanni Maria Riminaldi. The University of Ferrara was moved in 1963 to this building, while the library is still located there.

== Collection ==
In the library holds mediaeval manuscripts, among them the biblical manuscripts: 581, 582.

== Reading Room ==
The reading room of the library, was founded in 1750. The bookshelves and interior architecture were by Gaetano Barbieri, and the ceiling was decorated by Giuseppe Facchinetti, Giacomo Filippi and Alessandro Turchi.
