= Minuscule 904 =

- New Testament manuscript
- Text: Gospels
- Date: 14th century
- Script: Greek
- Now at: Greek Orthodox Patriarchate of Alexandria
- Size: 28 cm by 20 cm
- Type: Byzantine
- Category: V
- Note: marginalia

Minuscule 904 (in the Gregory-Aland numbering), ε 4001 (von Soden), is a 14th-century Greek minuscule manuscript of the New Testament on paper. It has marginalia. The manuscript has survived in complete condition.

== Description ==
The codex contains the text of the four Gospels, on 376 paper leaves (size 28 cm by 20 cm), with some lacunae. The text is written in one column per page, 23 lines per page.

== Text ==
The Greek text of the codex is a representative of the Byzantine. Hermann von Soden classified it to the textual family I^{k}. Kurt Aland placed it in Category V.

According to the Claremont Profile Method it represents textual family Π in Luke 1 and Luke 10, as a weak member. In Luke 20 it represents textual family K^{x}.

== History ==
According to the colophon it was written in September 1360 by Theophylact. Currently the manuscript is dated by the INTF to the 14th century.

It was examined and described by Victor Gardthausen (as 952).

The manuscript was added to the list of New Testament manuscripts by Gregory (904^{e}). It was not on the Scrivener's list, but it was added to his list by Edward Miller in the 4th edition of A Plain Introduction to the Criticism of the New Testament.

Jacob Greelings collated the text of the Gospel of Matthew and it was included in appendix A to work of S. Kubo.

It is not cited in critical editions of the Greek New Testament (UBS4, NA28).

The manuscript is housed at the Greek Orthodox Patriarchate of Alexandria (77).

== See also ==
- List of New Testament minuscules (1–1000)
- Biblical manuscript
- Textual criticism
- Minuscule 903
