= Minuscule 903 =

- New Testament manuscript
- Text: Gospels
- Date: 14th century
- Script: Greek
- Now at: Greek Orthodox Patriarchate of Alexandria
- Size: 18 cm by 13 cm
- Type: Byzantine
- Category: none
- Note: marginalia

Minuscule 903 (in the Gregory-Aland numbering), ε 4002 (von Soden), is a 14th-century Greek minuscule manuscript of the New Testament on paper. It has marginalia. The manuscript has survived in complete condition.

== Description ==
The codex contains the text of the four Gospels, on 233 paper leaves (size 18 cm by 13 cm), with some lacunae. The text is written in one column per page, 22 lines per page.

== Text ==
The Greek text of the codex is a representative of the Byzantine. Kurt Aland did not place it in any Category.

According to the Claremont Profile Method it has a mixture of the text-types in Luke 1, Luke 10, and Luke 20. It is related to M groups.

== History ==
According to the colophon it was written in 1382 by Theoleiptus in Damietta. Currently the manuscript is dated by the INTF to the 14th century.

It was examined and described by Victor Gardthausen (as 421).

The manuscript was added to the list of New Testament manuscripts by Gregory (903^{e}). It was not on the Scrivener's list, but it was added to his list by Edward Miller in the 4th edition of A Plain Introduction to the Criticism of the New Testament.

One leaf of the codex was brought in the 19th century to Petersburg. The leaf contains text of the Gospel of John 1:1-15. In 1908 Gregory gave number 2168 to it. It was later erased and included to minuscule 903 on the list Gregory-Aland.

The leaf from Petersburg was examined by Kurt Treu. Jacob Greelings collated the text of the Gospel of Matthew and it was included as appendix C to work of R. Chaplin "Family E and Its Allies in Matthew".

It is not cited in critical editions of the Greek New Testament (UBS4, NA28).

232 folios of the manuscript is housed at the Greek Orthodox Patriarchate of Alexandria (451). One leaf is housed at the National Library of Russia (Gr. 398) in Saint Petersburg.

== See also ==
- List of New Testament minuscules (1–1000)
- Biblical manuscript
- Textual criticism
- Minuscule 904
