= Minuscule 706 =

- New Testament manuscript
- Text: Gospels
- Date: 13th century
- Script: Greek
- Now at: Bodleian Library
- Size: 19 cm by 13.5 cm
- Type: Byzantine text-type/mixed
- Category: none

Minuscule 706 (in the Gregory-Aland numbering), ε347 (von Soden), is a Greek minuscule manuscript of the New Testament, on parchment. Palaeographically it has been assigned to the 13th century. The manuscript has complex contents. Scrivener labelled it by 486^{e}.

== Description ==
The codex contains the text of the four Gospels on 213 parchment leaves (size 19 cm by 13.5 cm).

The text is written in one column per page, 27 lines per page.

It contains list of the κεφαλαια before Gospel of Luke, but it was added by a later hand. The text is divided according to the Ammonian Sections, except the end of the Gospel of Mark. There is not a references to the Eusebian Canons. It contains lectionary markings, αναγνωσεις (lessons), subscriptions (except Luke), and στιχοι.

According to Scrivener it has "a very unusual style".

== Text ==
The Greek text of the codex is a representative of the Byzantine text-type. Kurt Aland did not place it in any Category.

According to the Claremont Profile Method it represents mixed Byzantine text, related to the textual family Π^{b} in Luke 1 and Luke 20. In Luke 10 no profile was made.

== History ==
Scrivener dated the manuscript to the 12th or 13th century, Gregory dated it to the 13th century. Currently the manuscript is dated by the INTF to the 13th century.

It was added to the list of New Testament manuscript by Scrivener (486) and Gregory (706). Gregory saw the manuscript in 1883.

Actually the manuscript is housed at the Bodleian Library (MS. Auct. T. 5. 34) in Oxford.

== See also ==
- List of New Testament minuscules
- Biblical manuscript
- Textual criticism
