= Minuscule 581 =

- New Testament manuscript
- Text: Gospels
- Date: 14th century
- Script: Greek
- Now at: Biblioteca Comunale Ariostea
- Size: 17 cm by 12 cm
- Type: Byzantine / mixed
- Category: none

Minuscule 581 (in the Gregory-Aland numbering), ε 426 (von Soden), is a Greek minuscule manuscript of the New Testament, on parchment. Palaeographically it has been assigned to the 14th century. The manuscript has complex contents. It was labeled by Scrivener as 450.

== Description ==
The codex contains a complete text of the four Gospels on 237 parchment leaves (size 17 cm by 12 cm). It is written in one column per page, 21-29 lines per page.

It contains lists of the κεφαλαια before every Gospel, numerals of the κεφαλαια (chapters) at the margin (in Latin and added by a later hand), the τιτλοι (titles) at the top, the Ammonian sections (in Mark 234 sections, last section in 16:9), lectionary markings, incipits, Synaxarion (Latin Synaxarion was added by a later hand), and Menologion.

== Text ==
The Greek text of the codex is a mixture of text-types with a predominate the Byzantine element. According to Hermann von Soden it is close to the textual family Π. Aland did not place it in any Category. According to the Claremont Profile Method it represents the textual family Π^{a} in Luke 1 and Luke 20. In Luke 10 no profile was made. It creates textual cluster with the codex Minuscule 2404.

In the Pericope Adultera, Tommy Wasserman found Family Π to include 581, 1272, 1306, 1571, 1627, 1690, 1699, and 2463.

== History ==
The manuscript was examined by Dean Burgon. It was added to the list of New Testament manuscripts by Frederick Henry Ambrose Scrivener.

The manuscript currently housed in at the Biblioteca Comunale Ariostea (CI. II, 119), at Ferrara.

== See also ==
- List of New Testament minuscules
- Biblical manuscript
- Textual criticism
