= Minuscule 51 =

- New Testament manuscript
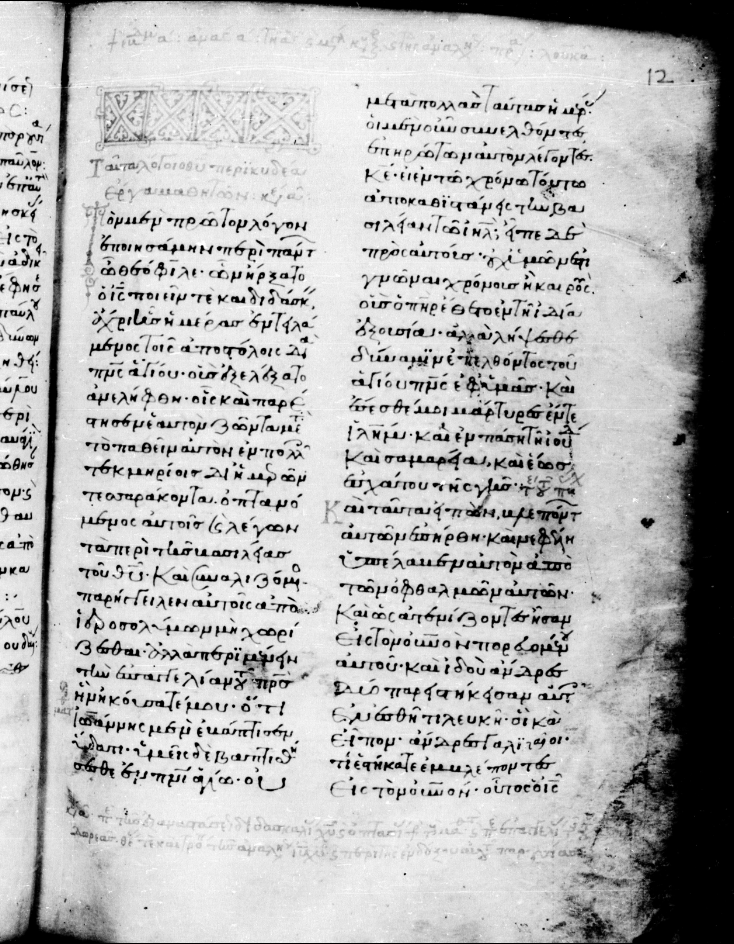
- Text: New Testament (except Rev.) †
- Date: 13th century
- Script: Greek
- Now at: Bodleian Library
- Size: 30 cm by 22 cm
- Category: none
- Note: unusual order of books

Minuscule 51 (in the Gregory-Aland numbering), δ 364 (Von Soden), is a Greek minuscule manuscript of the New Testament, on parchment leaves. Palaeographically it has been assigned to the 13th century. Formerly it was labelled by 51^{e} for the Gospels, 32^{a} for the Acts, and 38^{p} for the Pauline epistles. It has marginalia.

== Description ==
The codex contains the text of the New Testament except Book of Revelation on 325 parchment leaves (size 30 cm by 22 cm) with a commentary. The text is written in two columns per page, 28 lines per page.

The order of books is unusual: Acts, Pauline epistles, Catholic epistles and Gospels (as in codex 234). It contains three lacunae (2 Peter 3:2-17; Matthew 18:12-35; Mark 2:8-3:4).

The text is divided according to the κεφαλαια (chapters), whose numbers are given at the margin, and their τιτλοι (titles of chapters) at the top of the pages. The text of the Gospels has also another division according to the smaller Ammonian Sections, but the Eusebian Canons are absent. In the Acts and Epistles it has the Euthalian Apparatus.

It contains Prolegomena at the beginning, tables of the κεφαλαια (tables of contents) before each sacred book, liturgical books with hagiographies (synaxaria and Menologion), subscriptions at the end of each book, and lectionary markings at the margin (for liturgical use).

== Text ==
The Greek text of the codex is a representative of the Byzantine text-type. According to Scrivener it has many unusual readings. Hermann von Soden classified it to the textual family K^{x}. Kurt Aland did not place it in any Category. According to the Claremont Profile Method it has K^{x} text in Luke 1 and Luke 20. In Luke 10 no profile was made.

== History ==
The manuscript was dated by Gregory to the 12th century. Currently it has been assigned by the INTF to the 13th century.

In 1636 William Laud presented the manuscript to the Bodleian Library.

Mill pointed resemblance to the Complutensian text. It was examined by Mill (as Laud. 2), Bentley, and Griesbach. Bentley used it as codex γ. C. R. Gregory saw it in 1883.

Formerly it was labelled by 51^{e} for the Gospels, 32^{a} for the Acts, and 38^{p} for the Pauline epistles. Gregory in 1908 gave for it number 51.

It is currently housed in at the Bodleian Library (MS. Laud. Gr. 31), at Oxford.

== See also ==
- List of New Testament minuscules
- Biblical manuscript
- Textual criticism
