= Lectionary 184 =

Lectionary ℓ 184
- New Testament manuscript
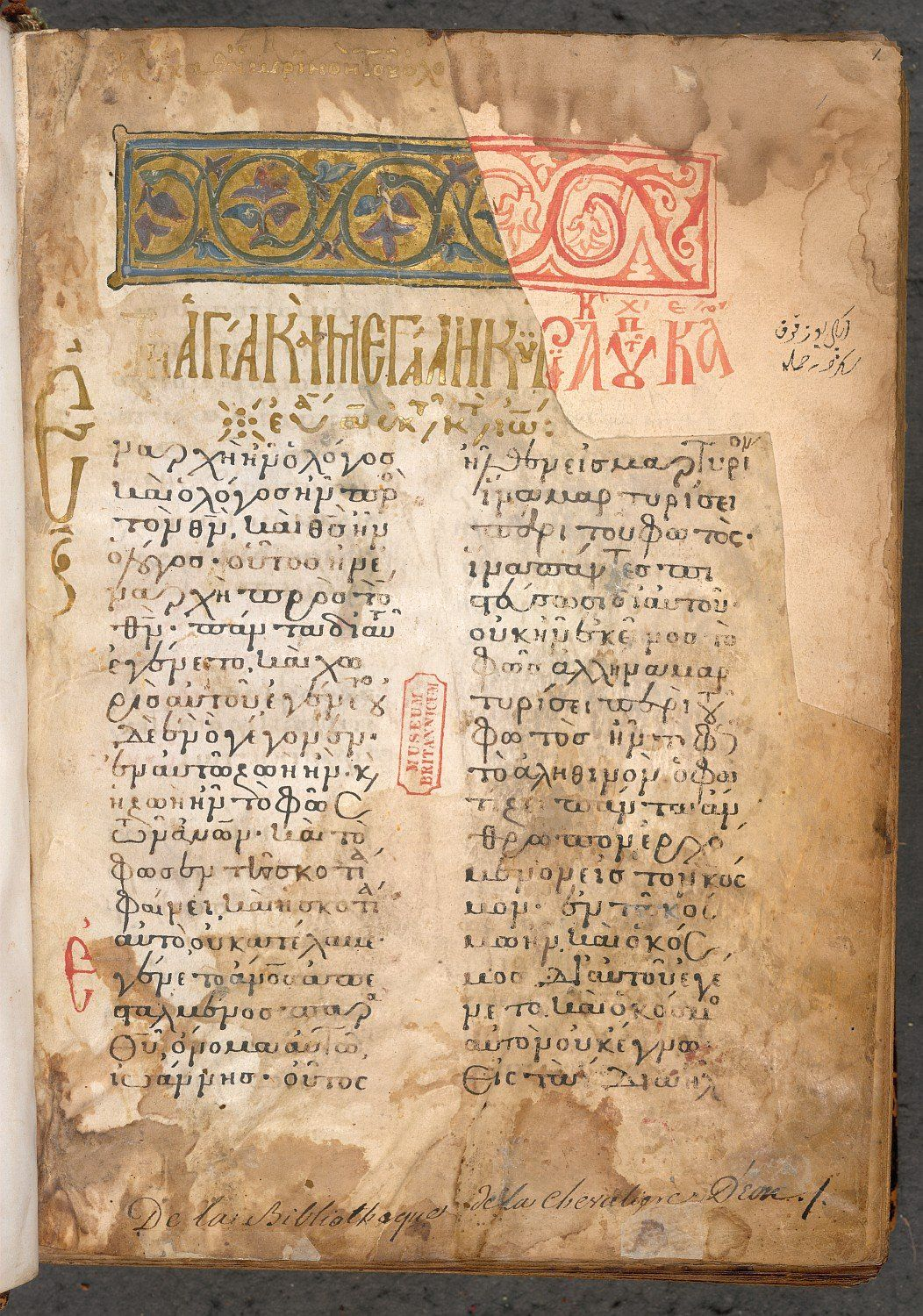
- Beginning Lesson (John 1:1–11)
- Text: Evangelistarion
- Date: 1319
- Script: Greek
- Now at: British Library
- Size: 30 cm by 22.5 cm

Lectionary 184 is a Greek New Testament manuscript written on parchment. It is designated by the siglum ℓ 184 in the Gregory-Aland numbering of New Testament manuscripts. Textual critics Westcott and Hort referred to it by the siglum 39^{e}, textual critic Scrivener by 259^{e}. It is dated by a colophon (this being a brief statement about the place/date/person who copied it) to the year 1319. It is currently housed at the British Library (Burney MS 22) in London.

== Description ==
The manuscript is a codex (the forerunner to the modern book), written in Greek minuscule letters, on 248 parchment leaves (30 cm by 22.5 cm). It is written in two columns per page, with 27-28 lines per page. Scrivener described it as being written in a large, clear hand, however due to the copyist's carelessness, half of many words are omitted, is replete with itacisms (spelling mistakes for common sounding letters), employs the incorrect usage of nu-moveable (this being the use of the Greek letter nu (ν) at the end of verbs before a consonant or vowel) causing hiatus, and several words and phrases are omitted due to homoeoteleuton (this being words and/or phrases which end with the same letters or same word). The codex uses gold ink for illuminations and section titles, with red ink used for liturgical directions, stops, and pauses. Though it contains breathings and accents in full (markings utilised to indicate changes of pitch or emphasis), most are inaccurate. There are some traces of a second scribe making corrections.

The codex is considered an Evangelistarium, containing all the Church lessons from the Gospels throughout the year. It also includes the Church lessons for Holy Week (week prior to Easter Sunday) and saint's days. Part of the first leaf (John 1:11-13) is on paper and was supplied by a later hand. According to theologian and textual-critic Caspar René Gregory, it has a "good text". When it was bound, several pages were misplaced by the binder, with which the order of pages 195-204 should be: 195-196; 203-204; 199-201; 197-198.

== Text ==
Due to several departures from readings in the New Testament Textus Receptus (the most common edition of the Greek New Testament), the readings of the codex are cited often by textual critic Constantin von Tischendorf in his critical Greek New Testament, the biblical scholar and textual critic Alford in his Greek New Testament, and Kurt Aland in the Nestle-Aland critical edition of the Greek New Testament.

=== Some notable readings ===
Below are some readings of the manuscript which agree or disagree with variant readings in other Greek manuscripts, or with varying ancient translations of the New Testament. See the main article Textual variants in the New Testament.

Matthew 23:38

ερημος (desert)

omit - ℓ 184 B L ff^{2} sy^{c} sa bo^{mss}
incl. - Majority of manuscripts

Luke 14:5

υἱὸς ὑμῶν (your son) - ℓ 184 1344 ℓ 1579
υἱὸς ἢ βοῦς (son or ox) - 𝔓^{45} 𝔓^{75} B W Δ 28 565 700

John 6:1

της θαλασσης της Τιβεριαδος (the sea of Tiberius) - ℓ 184 0210 1242 1344 2174
της θαλασσης της Γαλιλαιας της Τιβεριαδος (the sea of Galilee of Tiberius) - Majority of manuscripts

== History ==
The manuscript once belonged to classical scholar Charles Burney, along with the minuscule codices 480, 481, 482, 484, and 485. It was examined by Scrivener and Gregory. Scrivener collated its text along with 23 other manuscripts.

The manuscript is cited in the critical editions of the Greek New Testament (UBS3, UBS4). The codex is currently located in the British Library (Burney MS 22) in London.

== See also ==
- List of New Testament lectionaries
- Biblical manuscript
- Textual criticism
