= Minuscule 114 =

- New Testament manuscript
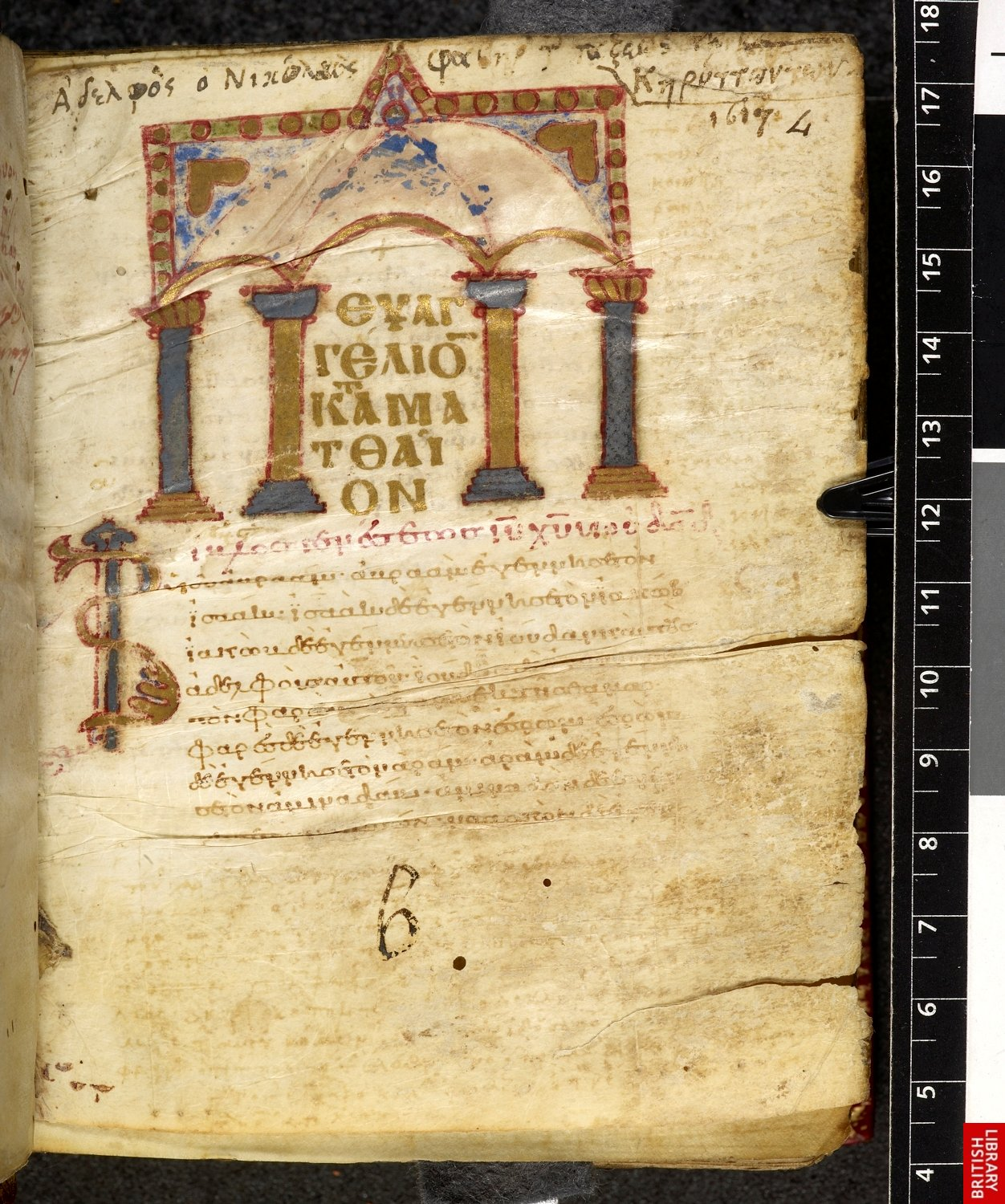
- The first page of the Gospel of Matthew
- Name: Codex Harleian. 5540
- Text: Gospels
- Date: 11th century
- Script: Greek
- Now at: British Library
- Size: 13.5 cm by 10.5 cm
- Type: Byzantine
- Category: none
- Hand: very elegant
- Note: marginalia

Minuscule 114 (in the Gregory-Aland numbering), ε 1018 (Soden), is a Greek minuscule manuscript of the New Testament, on parchment leaves. Palaeographically it has been assigned to the 11th century. It has marginalia.

== Description ==
The codex contains the text of the four Gospels on 280 parchment leaves (size 13.5 cm by 10.5 cm). It has some lacunae in Matthew 17:4-18; 26:59-73, Matthew 28:19-Mark 1:12 added by a later hand. The headpieces are decorated with gold and silver. It has itacistic errors.

The text is written in one column per page, in 20 lines per page. It is written by very elegant hand, with more recent marginal notes. The text is divided according to the κεφαλαια (chapters), whose numbers are given at the margin, and their τιτλοι (titles) at the top of the pages. There is also a division according to the Ammonian Sections, but there is no references to the Eusebian Canons.

It contains the Epistula ad Carpianum, tables of the κεφαλαια (tables of contents) before Luke and John. The Menologion was added in the 13th century. It has itacistic errors.

== Text ==
Hermann von Soden classified it to the textual family Π. Kurt Aland the Greek text of the codex did not place in any Category. According to the Claremont Profile Method it represents textual family Π^{a} in Luke 1, Luke 10, and Luke 20.

== History ==
In 1617 it belonged to Nicolaus Faber, Dominican. It was examined by Griesbach, Bloomfield. The text of the codex was published in 1837 (London) by Taylor. C. R. Gregory saw it in 1883. The manuscript was rebound in 1967.

It is currently housed at the British Library (Harley MS 5540).

== See also ==
- List of New Testament minuscules
- Biblical manuscript
- Textual criticism
