= Minuscule 485 =

- New Testament manuscript
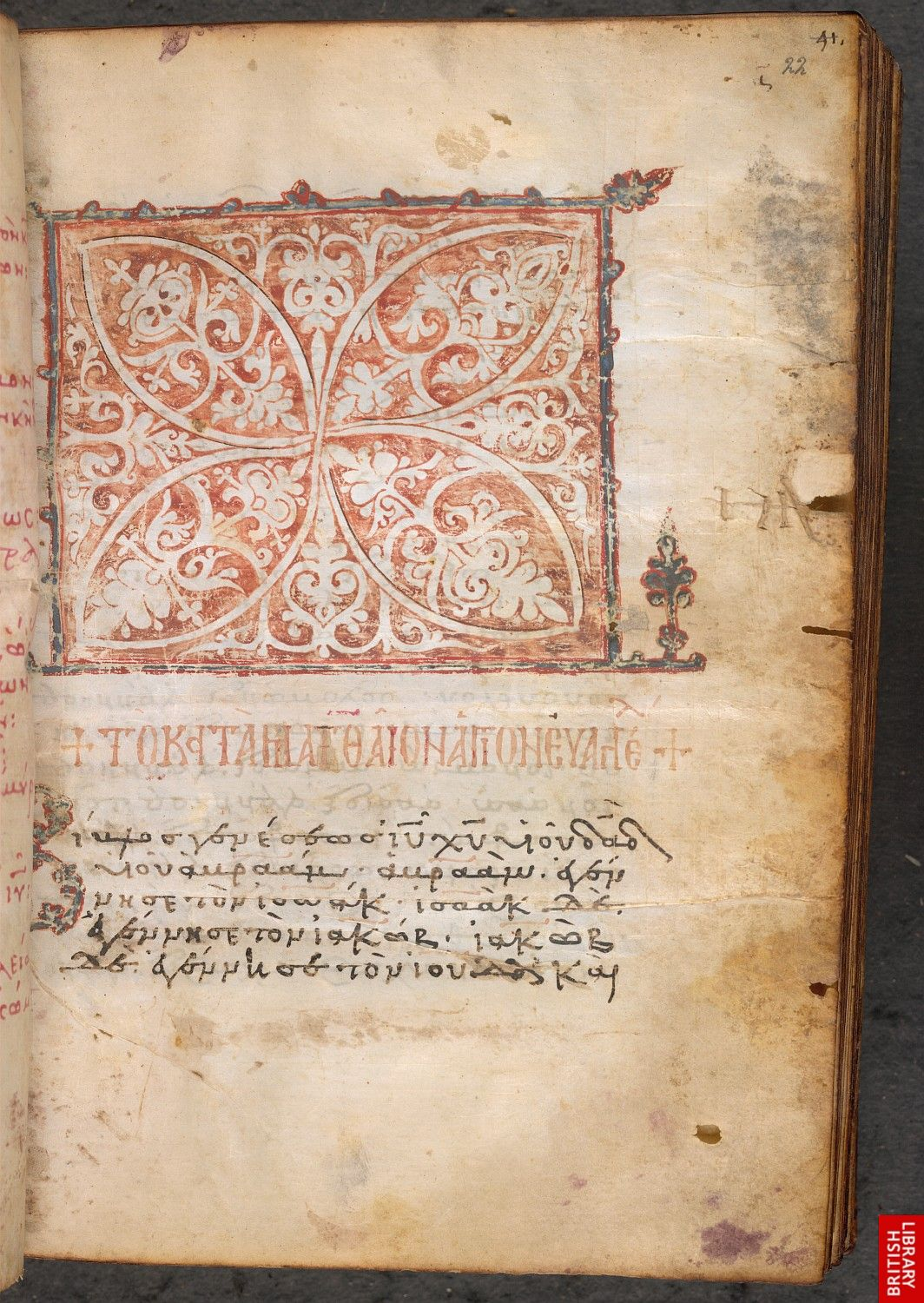
- Beginning of the Gospel of Matthew
- Text: Gospels †
- Date: 12th-century
- Script: Greek
- Now at: British Library
- Size: 19.5 cm by 15.3 cm
- Type: Byzantine text-type
- Category: V
- Hand: boldly but carelessly written

Minuscule 485 (in the Gregory-Aland numbering), ε 247 (in the Soden numbering), is a Greek minuscule manuscript of the New Testament, on parchment. Palaeographically it has been assigned to the 12th-century. Scrivener labeled it by number 572. The manuscript is lacunose. It contains liturgical books: Synaxarion and Menologion.

== Description ==
The codex contains the text of the four Gospels on 255 parchment leaves (size 19.5 cm by 15.3 cm) with some lacunae (Luke 5:22-9:32; 11:31-13:25; 17:25-18:3; John 8:14-21:25). The text is written in one column per page, 23-25 lines per page.

The text is divided according to the κεφαλαια (chapters), whose numbers are given at the margin, and their τιτλοι (titles) at the top. There is also another division according to the smaller Ammonian Sections (in red ink), whose numbers are given at the margin, but there is no references to the Eusebian Canons. It used capital letters at the beginning of each section.

It contains the Epistula ad Carpianum, tables of the κεφαλαια (tables of contents) before each Gospel, lectionary markings at the margin (for liturgical use), Synaxarion (list of Saints), Menologion (saint days), numbers of στιχοι, and pictures (before each Gospel).

The breathings and accents are complete but very inaccurate (e.g. Matthew 13:2.33; 24:41; 25:6; Mark 5:3.4; 6:26; Luke 24:6; John 7:30). There is no ι subscriptum, but adscriptum (Matthew 26:52; John 1:40.41), ν εφελκυστικον gets very frequent in the manuscript, and is often destroyed by secunda manu (second hand), even so often as to produce an hiatus (e.g. John 5:25; 7:6.27). A later hand is very busy in the margin, supplying the omissions through homoeoteleuton of the first scribe, or altering the original readings. There are more itacisms than in many other manuscripts.

== Text ==
The Greek text of the codex is a representative of the Byzantine text-type. Aland placed it in Category V. According to the Claremont Profile Method it represents textual family K^{x} in Luke 1, Luke 10, and Luke 20.

== History ==
The manuscript was held in Escorial, then it belonged to Charles Burney, as codices 480, 481, 482, 484, and ℓ 184. It was purchased for the British Museum in 1818.

The manuscript was added to the list of New Testament manuscripts by Scrivener, who thoroughly it examined and collated. Scrivener published its text in 1852.

It is currently housed at the British Library (Burney MS 23) in London.

== See also ==
- List of New Testament minuscules
- Biblical manuscript
- Textual criticism
