= Minuscule 74 =

- New Testament manuscript
- Text: Gospels †
- Date: 1291/1292
- Script: Greek
- Found: 1727
- Now at: Christ Church, Oxford
- Size: 20.1 cm by 14.8 cm
- Type: Byzantine text-type
- Category: V
- Note: full marginalia

Minuscule 74 (in the Gregory-Aland numbering), ε 321 (von Soden), is a Greek minuscule manuscript of the New Testament, on parchment leaves. It was written in 1291 or 1292. Some leaves of the codex were lost. It was adapted for liturgical use. It has full marginalia. The manuscript is lacunose.

== Description ==
The codex contains the text of the four Gospels with some lacunae (Matthew 1:1-14; 5:29-6:1). The text is written in one column per page, 26-27 lines per page on 204 leaves (size 20.1 cm by 14.8 cm).

The text is divided according to the κεφαλαια (chapters), whose numbers are given at the margin, and their τιτλοι (titles of chapters) at the top of the pages. There is also another division according to the smaller Ammonian Sections (in Matthew 359, in Mark 241 – 16:20, in Luke 341, in John 232), with references to the Eusebian Canons (written below Ammonian Section numbers).

It contains the Epistle to Carpianum, Eusebian Canon tables at the beginning, tables of the κεφαλαια (tables of contents) before each Gospel, Argumentum to Mark, synaxaria, Menologion, lectionary markings at the margin (for liturgical use), incipits, subscriptions at the end of each Gospel, and pictures.

== Text ==
The Greek text of the codex is a representative of the Byzantine text-type. Aland placed it in Category V.

According to Claremont Profile Method it represents textual family K^{x} in Luke 1 and Luke 20. In Luke 10 no profile was made. It creates textual cluster 74. To the cluster belong manuscripts: 74, 89, 198, 234, 390, 483, 484, 502, 561, (Luke 1), 1397, 1594, 1635, 1676, 2266, 2707, and 2749. The profile of the cluster is following: Luke 1 (6, 9, 27, 34), Luke 10 (15, 18, 23, 44, 57, 60), Luke 20 (4, 13, 19, 35, 50, 54, 62).

== History ==
The manuscript was written in 1291 or 1292 by scribe Theodore from the village Agios Petros in Arcadia. Theodore wrote minuscule 234 in 1278, 856 in 1280, 484 in 1292, 483 in 1295, 412 in 1301. Possibly it was recopied by minuscule 90 (Gregory).

It came in 1727 from the monastery of the Pantokrator on the Athos peninsula to England. The manuscript was presented to archbishop of Canterbury, William Wake (1657-1737), along with minuscule manuscripts 73, 506-520. Wake presented it to Christ Church, Oxford. In 1732 John Walker slightly collated it for Bentley.

C. R. Gregory saw it in 1883.

It is currently housed at Christ Church, Oxford (Wake 20).

== See also ==
- List of New Testament minuscules
- Biblical manuscript
- Textual criticism
