= Uncial 0210 =

- New Testament manuscript
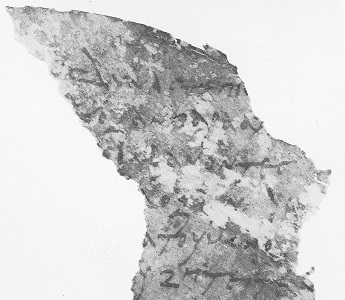
- Fragment of John 6:1
- Text: John 5:44; 6:1-2,41-42
- Date: 7th century
- Script: Greek
- Now at: Berlin State Museums
- Size: 10 x 7 cm
- Type: mixed
- Category: III

Uncial 0210 (in the Gregory-Aland numbering), is a Greek uncial manuscript of the New Testament, dated palaeographically to the 7th century.

== Description ==
The codex contains a small parts of the Gospel of John 5:44; 6:1-2,41-42, on 2 parchment leaves (10 cm by 7 cm). The text is written in one column per page, 8 lines per page, in uncial letters. The leaves are paginated.

The text-type of this codex is mixed. Aland placed it in Category III. It means, it has a historical importance.

In John 6:1 it reads της θαλασσης της Τιβεριαδος for της θαλασσης της Γαλιλαιας της Τιβεριαδος, the reading of the codex is supported by 1242, 1344, 2174, ℓ 184;

Currently it is dated by the INTF to the 7th century.

The manuscript was found in Fayum and brought to Berlin.

The manuscript was added to the list of the New Testament manuscripts by Kurt Aland in 1953.

The codex is currently housed at the Staatliche Museen zu Berlin (P. 3607, 3623) in Berlin.

== See also ==
- List of New Testament uncials
- Textual criticism
