= Minuscule 72 =

- New Testament manuscript
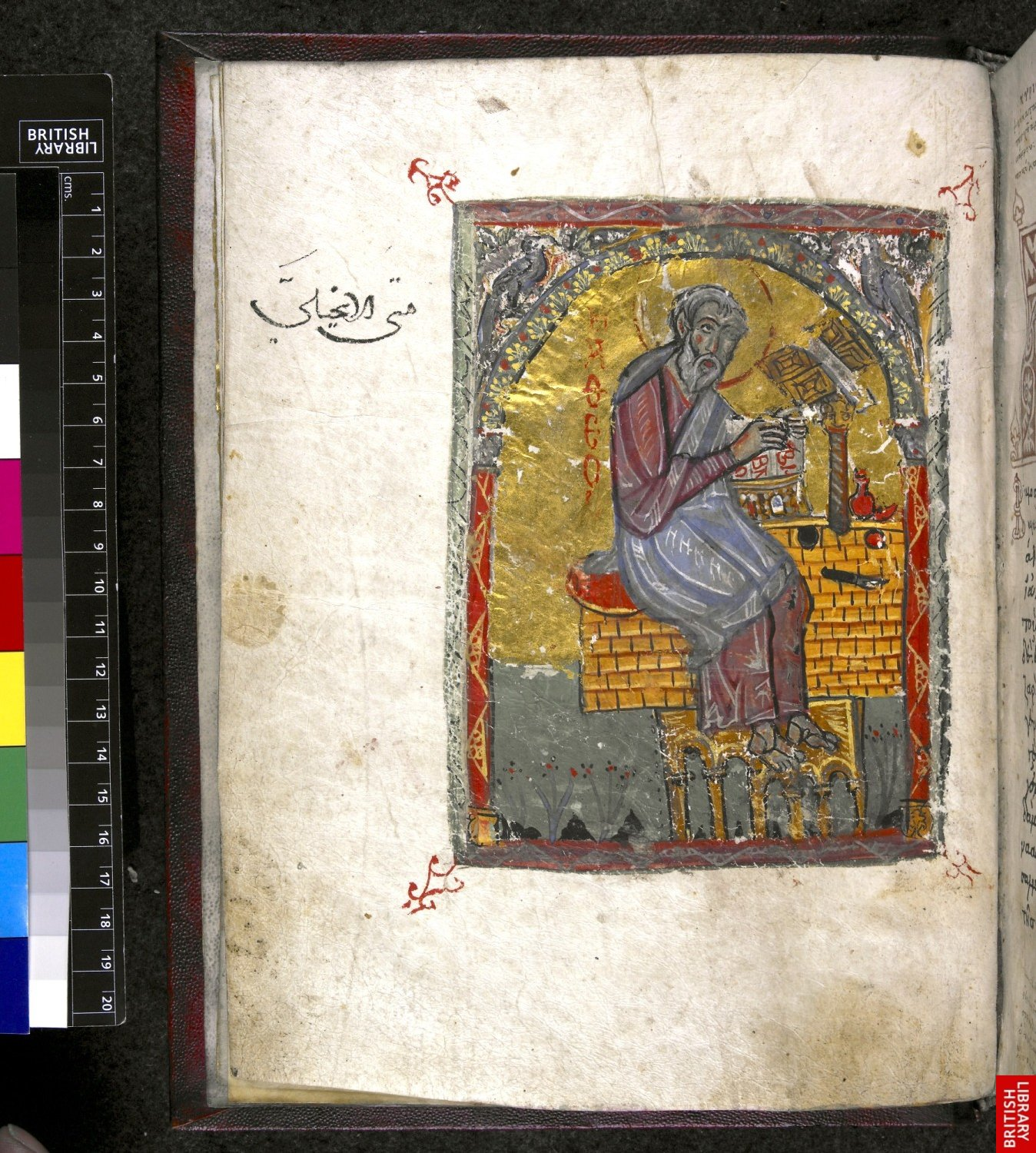
- Folio 3 verso, portrait of the Evangelist Matthew
- Text: Gospels
- Date: 11th century
- Script: Greek
- Now at: British Library
- Size: 25.2 cm by 20 cm
- Type: Byzantine text-type
- Category: none
- Hand: elegant
- Note: Family Π Marginalia

Minuscule 72 (in the Gregory-Aland numbering), ε 110 (von Soden), is a Greek minuscule manuscript of the New Testament, on parchment leaves. Palaeographically it has been assigned to the 11th century. John Mill called it Codex Ephesinus. The manuscript has complex contents with full marginalia.

It is currently housed at the British Library (Harley MS 5647).

== Description ==
The codex contains complete text of the four Gospels on 268 leaves (size 25.2 cm by 20 cm). The text is written in one column per page, 22-24 lines per page in an elegant minuscule letters. The capital letters in red.

The text is divided according to the κεφαλαια (chapters), whose numbers are given at the margin, τιτλοι (titles of chapters) at the top of the pages. There is also another division according to the smaller Ammonian Sections (Matthew 360, Mark 240 – 16:19; Luke 342, John 232), with references to the Eusebian Canons.

It contains the Epistle to Carpianum, the tables of the κεφαλαια (tables of contents) before each Gospel, portraits of the four Evangelists, lectionary markings at the margin (for liturgical use), and subscriptions at the end of each Gospel, with numbers of στιχοι (in Mark). It is elegantly written. It has scholia in Matthew and two scholia in Mark (16:19.20).

It has various readings and personal notes in the margin of the codex written in Greek and Arabic. The text of Matthew is surrounded by a catena (largely derived from the homilies of John Chrysostom).

== Text ==
The Greek text of the codex is a representative of the Byzantine text-type. Aland did not place it in any Category. According to Hermann von Soden it is related to the Family Π. It was confirmed by Kirsopp Lake. According to the Claremont Profile Method it represents family Π^{a} in Luke 1 and family K^{x} in Luke 10 and Luke 20.

It does not contain the Pericope Adulterae (John 7:53-8:11).

== History ==
The manuscript is dated by the INTF to the 11th century. It was written in Syria or Palestina.

According to Arabic notes on a margin, the manuscript was later in the property of a Presbyter David, the son of Micheal the Metropolitan of Bosra. C. R. Gregory saw it in 1883.

It was examined by Wettstein in 1731 and Griesbach.

== See also ==
- List of New Testament minuscules
- Biblical manuscript
- Textual criticism
