= Minuscule 480 =

Greek manuscript of New Testament

- New Testament manuscript
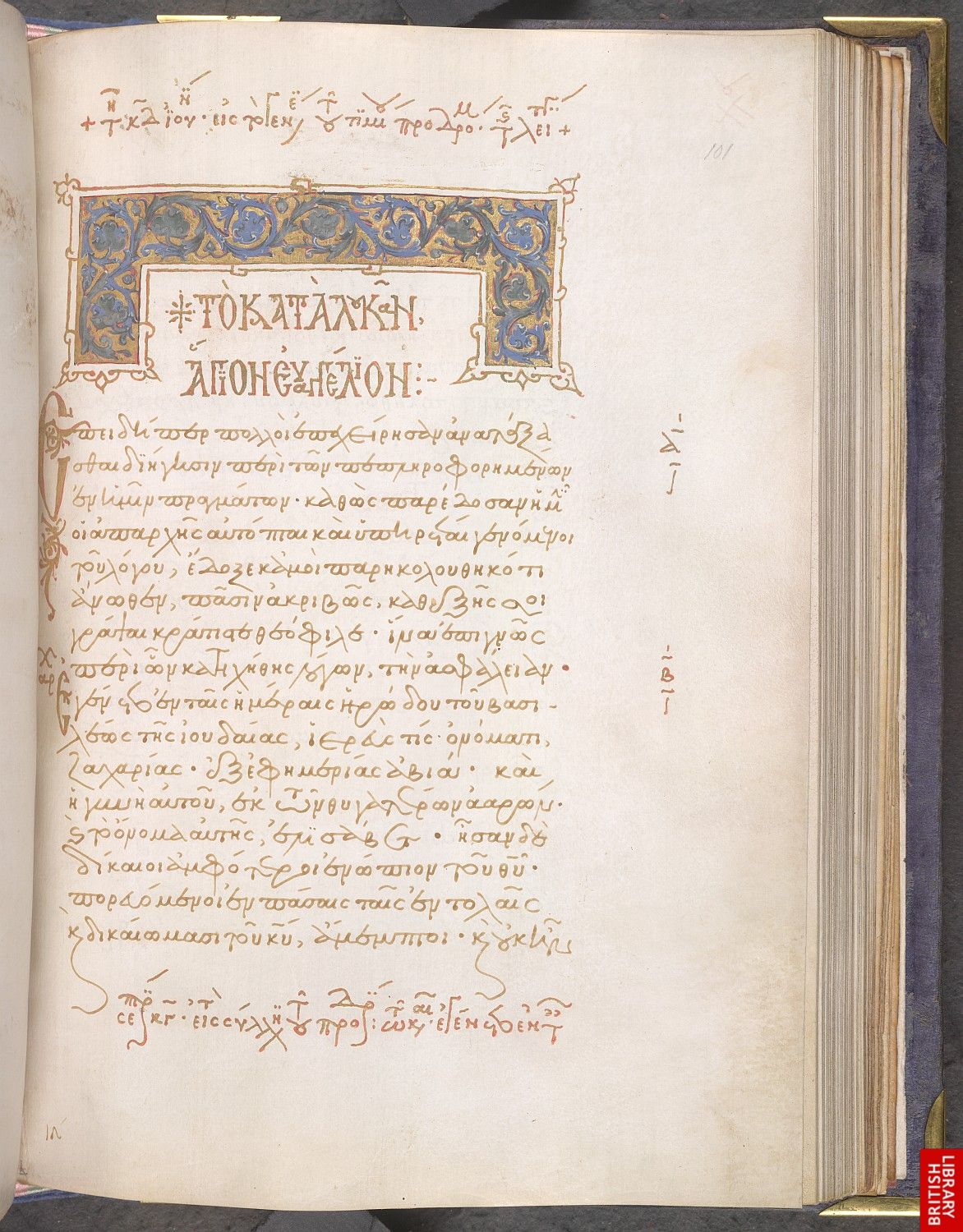
- The beginning of the Gospel of Luke (f. 101)
- Text: New Testament (except Revelation)
- Date: 1366
- Script: Greek
- Now at: British Library
- Size: 32.8 cm by 23.1 cm
- Type: Byzantine text-type
- Category: V
- Note: marginalia

Minuscule 480 (in the Gregory-Aland numbering), δ 462 (in the Soden numbering), is a Greek minuscule manuscript of the New Testament, on parchment. It is dated by a colophon to the year 1366. The manuscript is lacunose. The manuscript was adapted for liturgical use. It has marginalia. It contains liturgical books with hagiographies: Synaxarion and Menologion.

Scrivener labelled it by number 568.

== Description ==
The codex contains the text of the New Testament except Book of Revelation on 268 parchment leaves (size 32.8 cm by 23.1 cm), with only one lacuna (Hebrews 12:17-13:25). The text is written in one column per page, 23 lines per page. The vellum is fine and white.

The leaves 225-226 were supplied by a later hand on paper (flyleaves). It has decorated headpieces and initial letters at the beginning of each Gospel (folios 3, 63, 101, 163). The titles, initials, and capital letters in gold (chrysography).

The text is divided according to the κεφαλαια (chapters), whose numbers are given at the margin. It does not contain the τιτλοι (titles of chapters). The text of the Gospels has no additional division according to the smaller Ammonian Sections, with references to the Eusebian Canons.

It contains tables of the κεφαλαια (tables of contents) before each book, lectionary markings at the margin (for liturgical use), αναγνωσεις (lessons) are marked at the beginning and end, Synaxarion (table of lessons beginning at Easter) on folios 213-217v, Menologion (table of lessons beginning at 1 September) on folios 218-222v, subscriptions at the end of each book, numbers of στιχοι, and scholia. Lacuna in Hebrews 12:17-13:25 was supplied by a later hand on paper.

The order of books: Gospels, Acts, Catholic epistles, and the Pauline epistles (Philemon, Hebrews).

There are only 4 instances of N ephelkystikon, 37 occurrences of the error of itacism. The breathings and accents are complete and regular. Iota adscriptum never occurs, iota subscriptum 13 times in Matthew.

There are only a few corrections made by a later hand.

== Text ==
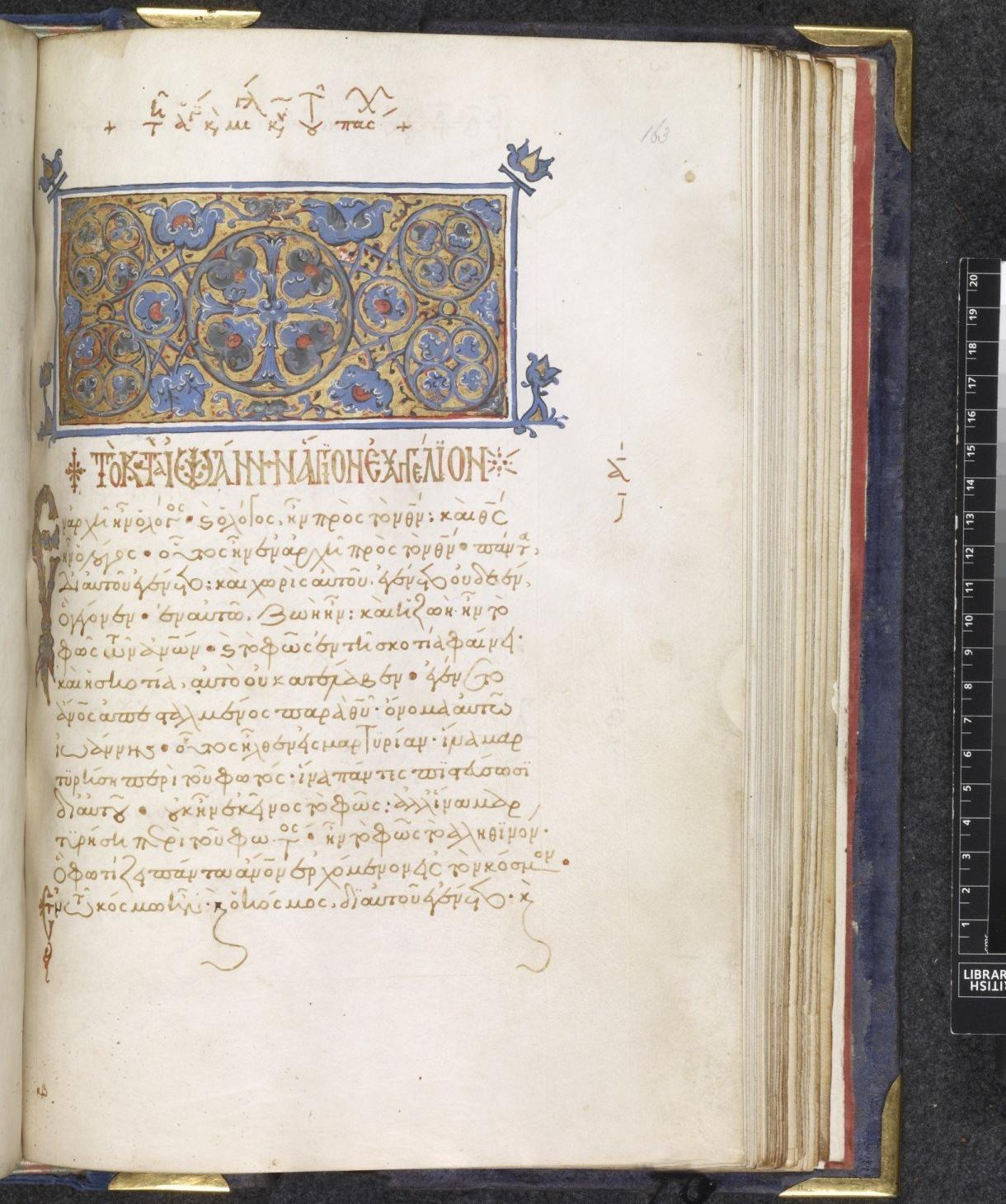
Folio 163, the first page of John

The Greek text of the codex is a representative of the Byzantine text-type. Hermann von Soden classified it to the textual family K^{r}. Kurt Aland placed it in Category V. According to the Claremont Profile Method it represents the textual family Family K^{r} in Luke 1, Luke 10, and Luke 20 as perfect member of the family. Textually it is close to the codex 201. In some cases it supports readings of the codices Vaticanus, Ephraemi Rescriptus, Bezae, Cyprius, and Regius.

It has several unique readings in Matthew 6:1; 9:5; 20:29; 26:65; Luke 1:11; 16:3; 17:6; John 14:30. Two rare readings from Luke 9:48 and John 1:28 are supported by the Codex Wordsworth and 201.

Matthew 9:5 αμαρτιαι ] αμαρτιαι σου

== History ==
According to the colophon (on folio 222 verso) the manuscript was written by one Joasaph on 4 June 1366 CE (θεου το δωρον και πονος ιωασαφ ετει ςωοδ), in monastery of the Theotokos ton Hodegon, in Constantinople.

It once belonged to Charles Burney, along with codices 481, 482, 484, 485, and ℓ 184. It was purchased for the British Museum in 1818.

The manuscript was examined and collated by Scrivener, who published its text in 1852. The manuscript was added to the list of New Testament manuscripts by Scrivener (568) and Gregory (480).

It is currently housed at the British Library (Burney MS 18, 222 fol.) in London.

== See also ==
- List of New Testament minuscules
- Biblical manuscript
- Textual criticism
