= Minuscule 265 =

- New Testament manuscript
- Text: Gospels
- Date: 12th century
- Script: Greek
- Now at: National Library of France
- Size: 25.1 cm by 19 cm
- Type: Byzantine
- Note: marginalia

Minuscule 265 is a Greek minuscule manuscript of the New Testament, written on parchment. It is designated by the siglum 265 in the Gregory-Aland numbering of New Testament manuscripts, and ε 285 in the von Soden numbering of New Testament manuscripts. Using the study of comparative writing styles (palaeography), it has been assigned to the 12th century. It has marginal notes.

== Description ==
The manuscript is a codex (the precursor to the modern book format), containing the complete text of the four Gospels on 372 parchment leaves (sized 25.1 cm by 19 cm). The text is written in one column per page, with 19 lines per page. The text of Matthew 13:24-33 was added by a later hand.

The text is divided according to the chapters (known as κεφαλαια / kephalaia), whose numbers are given in the margin, and their titles (known as τιτλοι / titloi) at the top of the pages. It contains the tables of contents (also known as κεφαλαια) before each Gospel. There is also a division according to the Ammonian Sections (in Mark 233 Sections, the last in 16:8), with references to the Eusebian Canons written below the Ammonian Section numbers (both early divisions of the gospels into reference sections).

== Text ==
The Greek text of the codex is considered a representative of the Byzantine text-type. Biblical scholar Kurt Aland did not place it in any Category of his New Testament manuscript classification system. According to the Claremont Profile Method (a specific analysis of textual data), it belongs to the textual family Π^{a} in Luke 1, Luke 10, and Luke 20, as a core member.

== History ==
The manuscript once belonged to Philibert de la Mare. The manuscript was added to the list of New Testament manuscripts by biblical scholar Johann M. A. Scholz (1794-1852).

It was examined and described by French Catholic Biblical scholar Paulin Martin. C. R. Gregory saw the manuscript in 1885. The manuscript is currently housed at the Bibliothèque nationale de France (shelf number Gr. 66) at Paris.

== See also ==
- List of New Testament minuscules
- Biblical manuscript
- Textual criticism
