= Minuscule 484 =

- New Testament manuscript
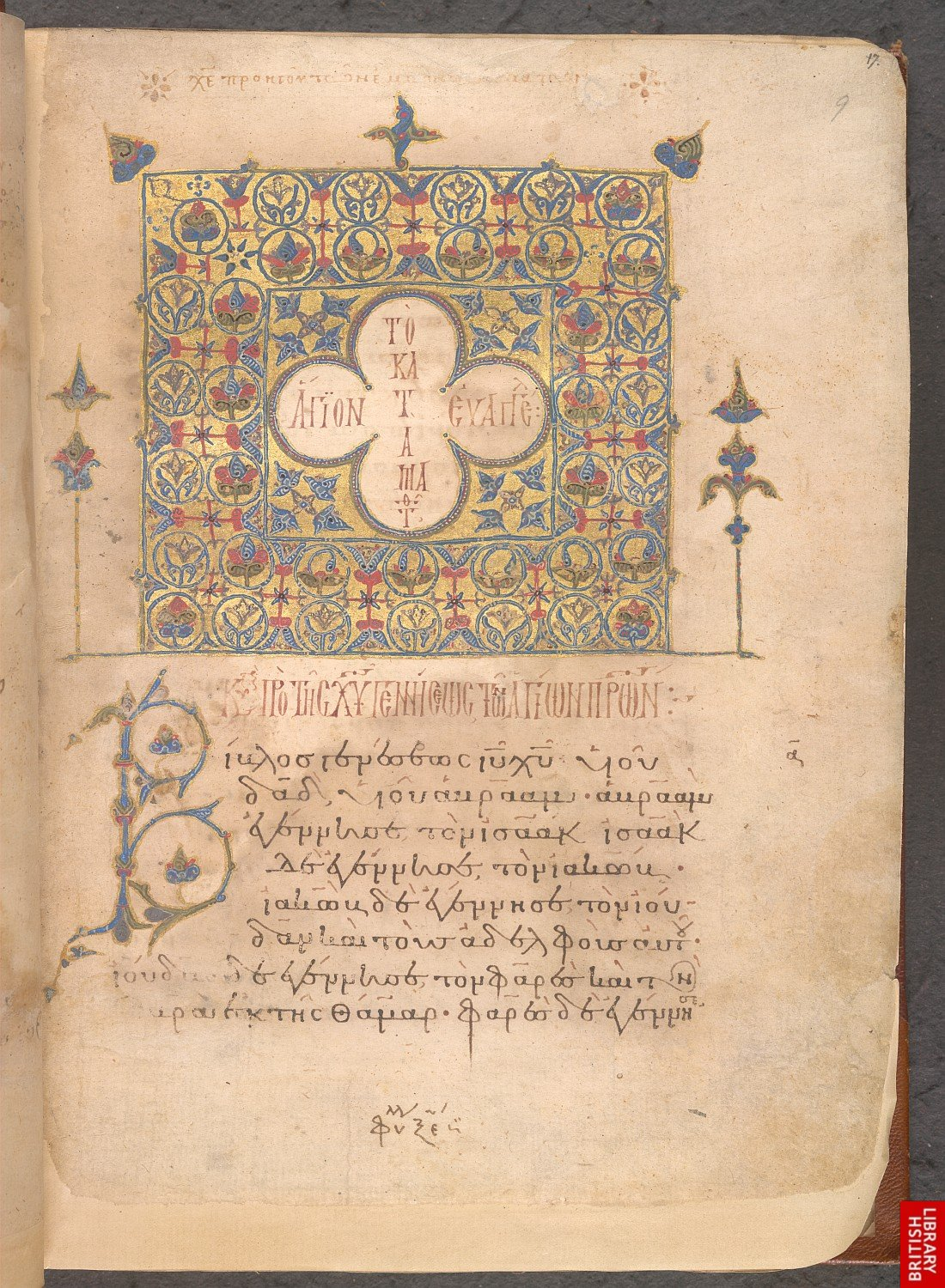
- Folio 9
- Text: Gospels
- Date: 1291/1292
- Script: Greek
- Now at: British Library
- Size: 34 cm by 25 cm
- Type: Byzantine text-type
- Category: V
- Note: fine copy, but damaged

Minuscule 484 (in the Gregory-Aland numbering), ε 322 (in the Soden numbering), is a Greek minuscule manuscript of the New Testament, on thick cotton paper (charta Damascena). It is dated by a Colophon to the year 1291/1292.

The manuscript was prepared for liturgical use. It contains liturgical books. Scrivener labelled it by number 571. The manuscript has complex contents.

== Description ==
The codex contains the complete text of the four Gospels on 258 thick paper leaves (size 34 cm by 25 cm). The leaves are arranged in octavo (eight leaves in quire). It is written in one column per page, 23-25 lines per page. In some parts the text is almost illegible.

The text is divided according to the κεφαλαια (chapters), whose numbers are given at the margin, and their τιτλοι (titles) at the top of the pages. There is also a division according to the Ammonian Sections (in Mark 234 sections, the last section in 16:9), but without references to the Eusebian Canons.

It contains the prolegomena, tables of the κεφαλαια (tables of contents) before each Gospel, lectionary markings at the margin (for liturgical use), incipits, liturgical books with hagiographies (Synaxarion and Menologion), subscriptions at the end of each Gospel, numbers of στιχοι, and pictures. It is a fine copy, but much damaged.

== Text ==
The Greek text of the codex is a representative of the Byzantine text-type. Aland placed it in Category V. According to the Claremont Profile Method it represents to the textual family Family K^{x} in Luke 1, Luke 10, and Luke 20. It belongs to the textual cluster 74. According to Scrivener it is different from the codex 483 — written by the same scribe — only in 183 places (errors of itacisms excluded).

The manuscript has several remarkable and unusual readings — from the point of view Textus Receptus — such as in Matthew 9:22; 18:30; 20:6; Mark 3:32; 5:22; 11:26; 12:12.

== History ==
According to the colophon on folio 258, the manuscript was written by monk Theodoros Hagiographita in the 6800 year from creation of the world, meaning in 1292 CE in Thessalonica, monastery of Philokalos. According to the note from 14th century on folio 8 verso, it was presented by monk Dositheos, son of the grammaticus Demetrios of Thessalonica, to the archon Alexios. Giovanni Saibante, of Verona, was its owner in the first half of the 18th century.

It once belonged to Charles Burney, as codices 480, 481, 482, 485, and ℓ 184. It was purchased for the British Museum in 1818.

The manuscript was examined and collated by Scrivener, who published its text in 1852. The manuscript was added to the list of New Testament manuscripts by Scrivener (571) and Gregory (484). Scrivener collated its text. It was examined by Henri Omont.

It is currently housed at the British Library (Burney MS 21) in London.

== See also ==
- List of New Testament minuscules
- Biblical manuscript
- Textual criticism
