= Minuscule 483 =

- New Testament manuscript
- Text: New Testament (except Rev.)
- Date: 1295
- Script: Greek
- Now at: Williams College
- Type: Byzantine text-type
- Category: V
- Note: marginalia

Minuscule 483 (in the Gregory-Aland numbering), ε 376 (in the Soden numbering), is a Greek minuscule manuscript of the New Testament, on parchment. It is dated by a colophon to the year 1285 (altered to 985). It contains liturgical books with hagiographies: Synaxarion and Menologion. Scrivener labelled it by number 543. The manuscript has complex contents.

== Description ==
The codex contains the text of the New Testament except Book of Revelation on 360 parchment leaves. It is written in one column per page, 22-23 lines per page.

The text is divided according to the κεφαλαια (chapters), whose numbers are given at the margin, and their τιτλοι (titles). The text of the Gospels is also divided according to the Ammonian Sections.

It contains the Epistula ad Carpianum, Eusebian Canon tables, tables of the κεφαλαια (tables of contents) before each Gospel, lectionary markings at the margin (for liturgical use), Synaxarion (before Acts and all Epistles), and Menologion (after Jude). It has many corrections made by two hands.

== Text ==
The Greek text of the codex is considered to be a representative of the Byzantine text-type. Biblical scholar Kurt Aland placed it in Category V of his New Testament manuscript classification system. Category V manuscripts are described as "manuscripts with a purely or predominantly Byzantine text."

According to Scrivener it is different from Minuscule 484 – both written by the same scribe – in 183 places (errors of itacism excluded). Due to these differences, Scrivener remarks, "how utterly futile is the idea of a standard text of the Constantinopolitan recension [=Byzantine text type], when the same official scribe, in the same monastery, within the space of three years, produces copies which exhibit so many, and occasionally such wide variations".

According to Claremont Profile Method (a specific analysis of textual data), it represents the textual family Family K^{x} in Luke 1, Luke 10, and Luke 20. It belongs to the textual cluster 74. In Luke 20 it was corrected to Family K^{r}.

It has many changes made in the text. The corrected text in Luke represents the textual family Family K^{r}.

== History ==
The manuscript was written by Theodorus Hagiopetrita (as Minuscule 74, 484) in 1295 CE. It once belonged to Caesar de Missy, then to the Duke of Sussex's library, which was sold in 1844. In 1845 it belonged to William Pickering, the bookseller and publisher. Scrivener in 1894 noted "its present locality is unknown". Gregory wrote the same in 1900: "Heute verschollen". It was found later to be in the U.S.A.

The manuscript was examined and collated by Scrivener, who published its text in 1852. It was added to the list of New Testament manuscripts by Scrivener (543) and Gregory (483).

Currently it is housed at Williams College (Chapin Libr., Cod. De Ricci, no. 1) in Williamstown, Massachusetts.

== See also ==
- List of New Testament minuscules
- Biblical manuscript
- Textual criticism
