= Minuscule 489 =

Greek minuscule manuscript of the New Testament

- New Testament manuscript
- Text: New Testament (except Rev.)
- Date: 1315/1316
- Script: Greek
- Now at: Trinity College, Cambridge
- Size: 18.5 cm by 12.7 cm
- Type: Byzantine text-type/mixed
- Category: none
- Hand: inelegantly written
- Note: Family Π

Minuscule 489 (in the Gregory-Aland numbering), δ 459 (in the Soden numbering), is a Greek minuscule manuscript of the New Testament, on paper. It is dated by a Colophon to the year 1315 or 1316. Scrivener labeled it by number 507. The manuscript is lacunose.

== Description ==
The codex contains the text of the New Testament except Book of Revelation on 363 paper leaves (size 18.5 cm by 12.7 cm) with one lacuna (Acts 7:48-60). It is written in one column per page, 28 lines per page. The text of Acts 7:48-60 was supplied by later hand.

The text is divided according to the κεφαλαια (chapters), whose numbers are given at the margin of the text, and their τιτλοι (titles of chapters) at the top of the pages. The text of the Gospels has also another division according to the smaller Ammonian Sections, whose numbers are written at the margin, with references to the Eusebian Canons. References are written below numbers of the Ammonian Sections. Number of sections is usual.

It contains prolegomena, tables of the κεφαλαια before each Gospel, lectionary markings at the margin (for liturgical use), subscriptions at the end of each book, αναγνωσεις (lessons), Synaxarion, and Menologion to the Gospels. It contains also υποθεσεις (explanatory of using the Eusebian Canons) and much extraneous matter to the Epistles.

== Text ==
The Greek text of the codex is a representative of the Byzantine text-type. Aland did not place it in any Category. According to the Claremont Profile Method it represents the textual family Π^{a} in Luke 1, Luke 10, and Luke 20, as a core member. It creates textual pair with 1219.

In 1 Corinthians 2:1 it reads σωτηριον (salvation) for μυστηριον (mystery), the reading is supported only by ℓ 598^{pt}, and ℓ 599.

== History ==
The manuscript has inelegantly written by a monk James from Mount Sinai. It came from the Pantokratoros monastery at Mount Athos and belonged to Richard Bentley (as did Minuscule 477).

The manuscript was added to the list of New Testament manuscripts by Scrivener (507) and Gregory (489). Scrivener thoroughly examined and collated the text of the manuscript (in 1859).

It is currently housed at Trinity College (B.X. 16) in Cambridge.

== See also ==
- List of New Testament minuscules
- Biblical manuscript
- Textual criticism
