= Family Π =

Group of New Testament manuscripts

Family Π is a group of New Testament manuscripts, and is one of the textual families which belongs to the majority Byzantine text-type. The name of the family, "Π" (pronounced in English as "pie"), is drawn from the symbol used for the manuscript known as Codex Petropolitanus. One of the most distinctive of the Byzantine sub-groups, it is the third largest and has the oldest Byzantine manuscripts belonging to it.

Textual critic Hermann von Soden designated this group by the symbol K^{a}. According to him, its text is not purely Byzantine.

== Codices and manuscripts ==
The following manuscripts were included in this group by von Soden: Cyprius (K), Petropolitanus (Π), 72, 114, 116, 178, 265, 389, 1008, 1009, 1079, 1154, 1200, 1219, 1346, and 1398. Biblical scholar Kirsopp Lake added to this group these manuscripts: 489, 537, 652, 775, 796, 904, 1478, 1500, 1546, 1561, 1781, 1816. von Soden also associated Codex Alexandrinus with this group, however biblical scholar Silva New demonstrated that though it shares several readings, Codex Alexandrinus is not related to the group. Frederik Wisse lists about 150 witnesses of the family, but the majority of them belong to this family only in some parts of their text. The Peshitta, in the Gospels, represents this family.

There are several manuscripts which are related to the family, such as Minuscule 706 and 2278. Based on a study on the Pericope Adultera, biblical scholar Tommy Wasserman found Family Π to include 581, 1272, 1306, 1571, 1627, 1690, 1699, and 2463.

== Group profile ==
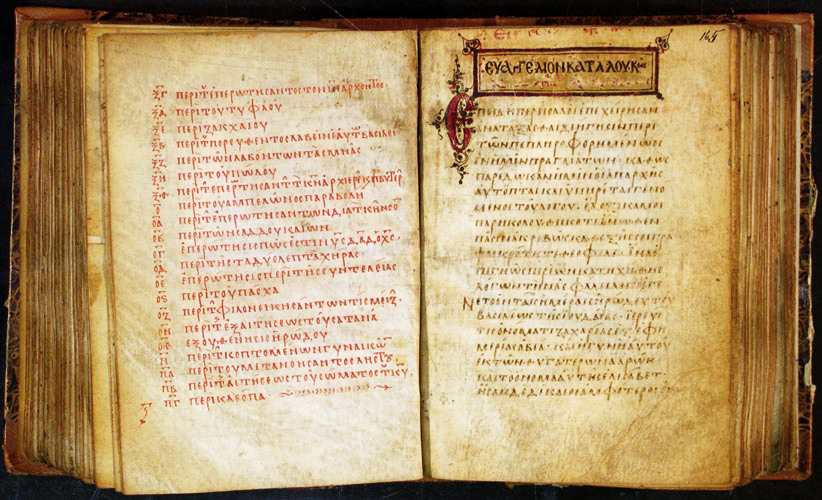
Codex Petropolitanus, beginning of Luke

According to the Claremont Profile Method (a specific analysis of textual data), group Π has the following readings as part of their unique profile in Luke chapters 1, 10, and 20: (Note: The word before the bracket is the reading of the UBS edition; the readings which are not bold are those of the Textus Receptus.)

- Luke 1:2 (1 reading) — παρεδοσαν ] παρεδοκαν
- Luke 1:8 (4) — εναντι ] εναντιον
- Luke 1:17 (12) — ετοιμασαι ] ετοιμασαι τω
- Luke 1:22 (14) — εδυνατο ] ηδυνατο
- Luke 1:39 (30) — αναστασα δε ] και αναστασα
- Luke 1:44 (34) — εν αγαλλιασει το βρεφος ] το βρεφος εν αγαλλιασει
- Luke 1:61 (41) — εκ της συγγενειας ] εν τη συγγενεια
- Luke 10:1 (1 reading) — δυο δυο ] δυο
- Luke 10:2 (8) — οπως ] οπως αν
- Luke 10:6 (15) — εαν ] εαν μεν
- Luke 10:11 (22) — εις τους ποδας ] omit
- Luke 10:12 (23) — λεγω ] λεγω δε
- Luke 10:16 (30) — ακουων υμων ] υμων ακουων
- Luke 10:17 (32) — οι εβδομηκοντα μετα χαρας ] μετα χαρας οι εβδομηκοντα
- Luke 10:22 (33) — παντα ] και στραφεις προς τους μαθητας ειπε παντα
- Luke 10:22 (38) — παρεδοθε ] παρα δεδοται
- Luke 10:32 (47) — ελθων ] omit
- Luke 10:32 (48) — ιδων ] ιδων αυτον
- Luke 10:35 (53) — τι ] τι δ'
- Luke 10:36 (57) — πλησιον δοκει σοι ] δοκει σοι πλησιον
- Luke 10:41 (63) — ειπεν αυτη ο κυριος (or Ιησους) ] ο κυριος ειπεν αυτη
- Luke 20:1 (2 reading) — εν τω ιερω ] omit
- Luke 20:1 (4) — αρχιερεις ] ιερεις
- Luke 20:3 (8) — υμας καγω ] καγω υμας
- Luke 20:3 (9) — ενα λογον (=TR) ] λογον ενα
- Luke 20:9 (19) — τις ] omit
- Luke 20:10 (23) — εξαπεστειλαν ] απεστειλαν
- Luke 20:12 (24) — και τουτον ] κακεινον
- Luke 20:14 (26) — διελογιζοντο ] διελογισαντο
- Luke 20:14 (28) — κληρονομος ] κληρονομος δευτε
- Luke 20:19 (33) — υστερον ] υστερον παντων
- Luke 20:19 (34) — τας χειρας ] την χειρα
- Luke 20:28 (50) — Μωυσης ] Μωσης
- Luke 20:34 (61) — γαμισκονται ] εκγαμιζονται (ΤR reads: εκγαμισκονται)
- Luke 20:35 (62) — γαμιζονται ] εκγαμιζονται (ΤR reads: εκγαμισκονται)
- Luke 20:36 (64) — εισι(ν) ] omit
- Luke 20:37 (65) — Μωυσης ] Μωσης
- Luke 20:41 (70) — λεγουσι(ν) ] λεγουσι(ν) τινες
- Luke 20:44 (74) — κυριον αυτον ] αυτον κυριον
- Luke 20:44 (75) — αυτου υιος ] υιος αυτου.

== See also ==
- Family E
- Family K^{r}
- Family K^{x}
- Family K^{1}
- Family 1424
- Family 1739
