= List of New Testament minuscules (301–400) =

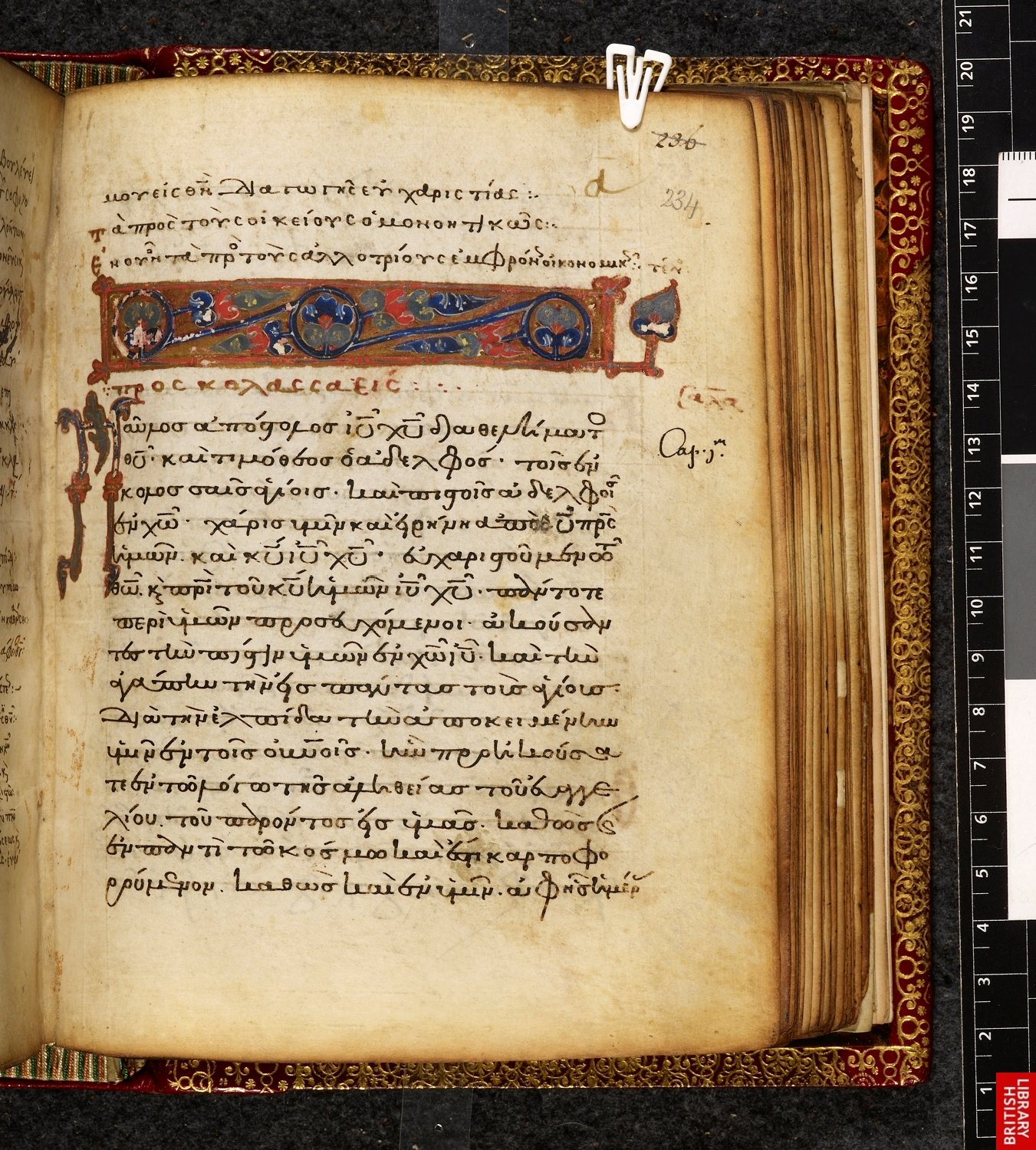
First page of the Epistle to the Colossians in Codex Harleianus 5557 (Minuscule 321) from 12th century.

A New Testament minuscule is a copy of a portion of the New Testament written in a small, cursive Greek script (developed from Uncial).

== Legend ==
- The numbers (#) are the now standard system of Caspar René Gregory, often referred to as the Gregory-Aland numbers.
- Included among the cataloged minuscules are the following types of manuscripts, color coded:

Grey represents continuous text manuscripts containing only New Testament portions
Beige represents manuscripts with New Testament portions and a catena (quotations from church fathers)
Light cyan represents manuscripts of single-author commentaries who included the full Scripture text.
Light red represents manuscripts of single-author commentaries who included both the full Scripture text and a catena.
Light purple represents manuscripts of commentaries where the Scripture text was abridged.
White represents manuscript numbers no longer in use.

- Dates are estimated to the nearest 100 year increment where specific date is unknown.
- Content generally only describes sections of the New Testament: Gospels, The Acts of the Apostles (Acts), Pauline epistles, and so on. Sometimes the surviving portion of a codex is so limited that specific books, chapters or even verses can be indicated. Linked articles, where they exist, generally specify content in detail, by verse.
- Digital images are referenced with direct links to the hosting web pages, with the exception of those at the INTF. The quality and accessibility of the images is as follows:

Gold color indicates high resolution color images available online.
Tan color indicates high resolution color images available locally, not online.
Light tan color indicates only a small fraction of manuscript pages with color images available online.
Light gray color indicates black/white or microfilm images available online.
Light blue color indicates manuscript not imaged, and is currently lost or ownership unknown.
Light pink color indicates manuscript destroyed, presumed destroyed, or deemed too fragile to digitize.
Violet color indicates high resolution ultraviolet images available online.

† Indicates the manuscript has damaged or missing pages.
^{P} Indicates only a portion of the books were included.
^{K} Indicates manuscript also includes a commentary.
^{S} Indicates lost portions of manuscript replaced via supplement of a later hand.
^{abs} (abschrift) Indicates manuscript is copy.
[ ] Brackets around Gregory-Aland number indicate the manuscript belongs to an already numbered manuscript, was found to not be a continuous text manuscript, was found to be written in modern Greek versus Koine Greek, was proved a forgery, or has been destroyed.

== Minuscules 301-400 ==
#	Date	Contents	Pages	Institution and refs.	City, State	Country	Images
301	11th	Gospels	221	National Library, Grec 187	Paris	France	BnF, INTF, CSNTM
302	11th	Acts†, Pauline Epistles^{P}†, General Epistles	333	National Library, Grec 103	Paris	France	BnF, INTF, CSNTM
303	1255	Theophylact Commentary on the Gospels†	321	National Library, Grec 194 A	Paris	France	BnF, INTF
304	12th	Matthew, Mark	241	National Library, Grec 194	Paris	France	BnF, INTF, CSNTM
305	13th	Zigabenus Commentary on the Gospels†	261	National Library, Grec 195	Paris	France	BnF, INTF, CSNTM
306	12th	Theophylact Commentary on Matthew, John†	559	National Library, Grec 197	Paris	France	BnF, INTF
307	10th	Acts, General Epistles	254	National Library, Coislin 25	Paris	France	BnF, INTF
308	14th	Acts†, Pauline epistles†, General Epistles†	145	British Library, Royal MS 1 B. I	London	UK	BL
308	14th	Acts†, Pauline epistles†, General Epistles†	145	British Library, Royal MS 1 B. I	London	UK	INTF
309	13th	Acts†, Romans-Titus†, General Epistles	159	Cambridge University Library, Dd. 11.90	Cambridge	UK	INTF
309	13th	Acts†, Romans-Titus†, General Epistles	159	Cambridge University Library, Dd. 11.90	Cambridge	UK	CSNTM
310	12th	Matthew† (Nicetas Catena)	378	National Library, Grec 202	Paris	France	BnF, INTF
311	12th	Matthew†	357	National Library, Grec 203	Paris	France	BnF, INTF, CSNTM
312	11th	Acts†, Pauline Epistles†, General Epistles	298	British Library, Add MS 5115, Add MS 5116	London	UK	BL
312	11th	Acts†, Pauline Epistles†, General Epistles	298	British Library, Add MS 5115, Add MS 5116	London	UK	INTF
313	15th	Luke 1:1–12:16†	460	National Library, Grec 208	Paris	France	BnF, INTF, CSNTM
314	11th	Acts^{S}†, Pauline Epistles†, General Epistles†, Revelation†	299	Bodleian Library, Ms. Barocci 3	Oxford	UK	DB
314	11th	Acts^{S}†, Pauline Epistles†, General Epistles†, Revelation†	299	Bodleian Library, Ms. Barocci 3	Oxford	UK	INTF
315	13th	Theophylact Commentary on John^{S}†	156	National Library, Grec 210	Paris	France	BnF, INTF, CSNTM
316	14th	Theophylact Commentary on Luke 18:18–24:53†; John 1:16–12:25†	129	National Library, Grec 211	Paris	France	BnF, INTF
317	12th	John† (Nicetas Catena)	352	National Library, Grec 212	Paris	France	BnF, INTF, CSNTM
318	14th	Theophylact Commentary on John† 7:9–12:8	16	National Library, Grec 213	Paris	France	BnF, INTF
319	12th	Acts^{S}†, Pauline Epistles, General Epistles^{S}†	303	Christ's College, G.G. 1.9 (Ms. 9)	Cambridge	UK	CSNTM
319	12th	Acts^{S}†, Pauline Epistles, General Epistles^{S}†	303	Christ's College, G.G. 1.9 (Ms. 9)	Cambridge	UK	INTF
320	12th	Theophylact Commentary on Luke	392	National Library, Grec 232	Paris	France	BnF, INTF
321	12th	Acts†, Pauline Epistles†, General Epistles	293	British Library, Harley MS 5557	London	UK	BL
321	12th	Acts†, Pauline Epistles†, General Epistles	293	British Library, Harley MS 5557	London	UK	INTF
322	14th	Acts, Pauline Epistles, General Epistles	134	British Library, Harley MS 5620	London	UK	BL
322	14th	Acts, Pauline Epistles, General Epistles	134	British Library, Harley MS 5620	London	UK	INTF
323	12th	Acts, Pauline Epistles, General Epistles	374	Geneva Library, Gr. 20	Geneva	Switzerland	INTF, CSNTM
324	14th	Gospels	170	National Library, Grec 376, fol. 146-315	Paris	France	BnF, INTF, CSNTM
325	11th	Acts^{S}†, Pauline Epistles, General Epistles^{S}†, Revelation	233	Bodleian Library, MS. Auct. E. 5.9	Oxford	UK	INTF
326	10th	Acts, Pauline Epistles†, General Epistles†	206	Lincoln College, Gr. 82	Oxford	UK	INTF
327	13th	Acts, Pauline Epistles, General Epistles	298	New College, 59	Oxford	UK	INTF
328	13th	Acts, Pauline Epistles, General Epistles	215	Leiden University Library, Voss. Gr. Q. 77	Leiden	Netherlands	INTF
329	12th	Gospels†	321	National Library, Coislin, Grec 19	Paris	France	BnF, INTF
330	12th	Gospels, Acts, Pauline Epistles, General Epistles	287	Russian National Library, Gr. 101	Saint Petersburg	Russia	INTF
331	11th	Gospels	275	National Library, Coislin, Grec 197	Paris	France	BnF, INTF
332	12th	Gospels	304	Turin National University Library, C. II. 4	Turin	Italy	INTF
333	1214	Matthew, John (Nicetas Catena)	377	Turin National University Library, B. I. 9	Turin	Italy	INTF
334	12th	Zigabenus Commentary on Matthew, Mark	271	Turin National University Library, B. III. 8	Turin	Italy	INTF
335	16th	Gospels	112	Turin National University Library, B. III. 2	Turin	Italy	INTF
336	15th	Acts, Pauline Epistles, General Epistles, Revelation	268	University of Hamburg, Cod. theol. 1252a	Hamburg	Germany	INTF
337	12th	Acts†, Pauline Epistles, General Epistles, Revelation†	375	National Library, Grec 56	Paris	France	BnF, INTF, CSNTM
338	10th	Gospels	365	Turin National University Library, B. VII. 33, B.VI.43	Turin	Italy	
339	13th	New Testament†	200	Turin National University Library, B. V. 8	Turin	Italy	INTF
340	14th	Gospels	243	Formerly, Turin National University Library, B. VII. 16 (destroyed)	Turin	Italy	
341	1296	Gospels	268	Formerly, Turin National University Library, B. VII. 14 (destroyed)	Turin	Italy	
342	13th	Gospels	300	Turin National University Library, B. V. 24	Turin	Italy	INTF
343	11th	Gospels	283	Ambrosiana Library, H 13 sup. (gr. 423)	Milan	Italy	INTF
344	10th	Gospels^{s}†	327	Ambrosiana Library, G 16 sup.	Milan	Italy	INTF
345	11th	Gospels	375	Ambrosiana Library, F 17 sup.	Milan	Italy	INTF
346	12th	Gospels†	168	Ambrosiana Library, S 23 sup.	Milan	Italy	INTF, CSNTM
347	12th	Gospels	245	Ambrosiana Library, R 35 sup.	Milan	Italy	INTF
348	1022	Gospels	187	Ambrosiana Library, B 56 sup.	Milan	Italy	INTF
349	1322	Gospels	399	Ambrosiana Library, F 61 sup. (gr. 342)	Milan	Italy	INTF
350	11th	Gospels†	305	Ambrosiana Library, B 62 sup.	Milan	Italy	INTF
351	12th	Gospels	268	Ambrosiana Library, B 70 sup.	Milan	Italy	INTF
352	11th	Gospels†	219	Ambrosiana Library, B 93 sup.	Milan	Italy	INTF
353	12th	Gospels†	194	Ambrosiana Library, M 93 sup.	Milan	Italy	INTF
354	11th	Theophylact Commentary on Matthew†	442	Marciana National Library, Gr. Z. 29 (497)	Venice	Italy	INTF
355	12th	Gospels	410	Marciana National Library, Gr. Z. 541 (558)	Venice	Italy	INTF
356	12th	Pauline Epistles†, 2 Peter 2:4-3:18†, 1 John 1:1-3:20†	145	Emmanuel College, I. 4. 35	Cambridge	UK	INTF
357	11th	Luke, John	281	Marciana National Library, Gr. Z. 28 (364)	Venice	Italy	INTF
358	14th	Gospels	203	Estense Library, G. 9, a.U.2.3. (II A 9)	Modena	Italy	INTF
359	13th	Gospels	310	Estense Library, G. 242, a.T.7.23. (III B 16)	Modena	Italy	INTF
360	11th	Gospels	220	Palatina Library, Ms. Parm. 2319	Parma	Italy	INTF
361	13th	Gospels	186	Palatina Library, Ms. Parm. 1821	Parma	Italy	INTF
362	13th	Luke 6:29–12:10 (Nicetas Catena)	314	Laurentian Library, Conv.Soppr.176	Florence	Italy	BML, CSNTM, INTF
363	14th	Gospels, Acts, Pauline Epistles, General Epistles	306	Laurentian Library, Plut.06.13	Florence	Italy	BML, INTF
364	10th	Gospels	284	Laurentian Library, Plut.06.24	Florence	Italy	BML, INTF
365	12th	Gospels, Acts, Pauline Epistles†, General Epistles†	356	Laurentian Library, Plut.06.36	Florence	Italy	BML, INTF, CSNTM
365	12th	Gospels, Acts, Pauline Epistles†, General Epistles†	356	Laurentian Library, Plut.06.36	Florence	Italy	CSNTM (2)
366	14th	Matthew†	323	Laurentian Library, Conv.Soppr.171	Florence	Italy	BML, CSNTM, INTF
367	1331	New Testament	349	Laurentian Library, Conv.Soppr.53	Florence	Italy	BML, CSNTM, INTF
368	15th	John, 1–3 John, Revelation	96	Biblioteca Riccardiana, 84	Florence	Italy	INTF
369	14th	Mark† 6:25–9:45, 10:17–16:9	23	Riccardian Library, 90	Florence	Italy	INTF
370	14th	Theophylact Commentary on the Gospels†	437	Riccardian Library, 5	Florence	Italy	INTF
371	10th	Gospels	315	Vatican Library, Vat.gr.1159	Vatican City	Vatican	DVL
371	10th	Gospels	315	Vatican Library, Vat.gr.1159	Vatican City	Vatican	INTF
372	16th	Gospels†	199	Vatican Library, Vat.gr.1161	Vatican City	Vatican	INTF
373	15th	Gospels	221	Vatican Library, Vat.gr.1423	Vatican City	Vatican	INTF
374	11th	Gospels	173	Vatican Library, Vat.gr.1445	Vatican City	Vatican	INTF
375	11th	Gospels	199	Vatican Library, Vat.gr.1533	Vatican City	Vatican	DVL
376	11th	Gospels	185	Vatican Library, Vat.gr.1539	Vatican City	Vatican	INTF
377	16th	Gospels	339	Vatican Library, Vat.gr.1618	Vatican City	Vatican	INTF
378	13th	Acts, Pauline Epistles, General Epistles	221	Bodleian Library, MS. E. D. Clarke 4	Oxford	UK	INTF
379	15th	Zigabenus Commentary on the Gospels	437	Vatican Library, Vat.gr.1769	Vatican City	Vatican	INTF
380	1499	Gospels	202	Vatican Library, Vat.gr.2139	Vatican City	Vatican	INTF
381	14th	Gospel of Luke	226	Vatican Library, Pal.gr.20	Vatican City	Vatican	HU
381	14th	Gospel of Luke	226	Vatican Library, Pal.gr.20	Vatican City	Vatican	INTF
382	11th	Gospels	167	Vatican Library, Vat.gr.2070	Vatican City	Vatican	INTF, CSNTM
383	13th	Acts, Pauline Epistles, General Epistles	181	Bodleian Library, MS. E. D. Clarke 9	Oxford	UK	INTF, CSNTM
384	13th	Acts, Pauline Epistles, General Epistles	132	British Library, Harley MS 5588	London	UK	BL
384	13th	Acts, Pauline Epistles, General Epistles	132	British Library, Harley MS 5588	London	UK	INTF
385	1407	Acts, Pauline Epistles, General Epistles†, Revelation†	267	British Library, Harley MS 5613	London	UK	BL
385	1407	Acts, Pauline Epistles, General Epistles†, Revelation†	267	British Library, Harley MS 5613	London	UK	INTF
386	14th	New Testament	393	Vatican Library, Ott.gr.66	Vatican City	Vatican	DVL, INTF
387	12th	Gospels	298	Vatican Library, Ott.gr.204	Vatican City	Vatican	DVL
387	12th	Gospels	298	Vatican Library, Ott.gr.204	Vatican City	Vatican	INTF
388	13th	Gospels	315	Vatican Library, Ott.gr.212	Vatican City	Vatican	DVL
388	13th	Gospels	315	Vatican Library, Ott.gr.212	Vatican City	Vatican	INTF
389	11th	Gospels	197	Vatican Library, Ott.gr.297	Vatican City	Vatican	DVL
389	11th	Gospels	197	Vatican Library, Ott.gr.297	Vatican City	Vatican	INTF
390	1281-2	Gospels, Acts, Pauline Epistles, General Epistles	336	Vatican Library, Ott.gr.381	Vatican City	Vatican	DVL
390	1281-2	Gospels, Acts, Pauline Epistles, General Epistles	336	Vatican Library, Ott.gr.381	Vatican City	Vatican	INTF
391	1055	Gospels†	232	Vatican Library, Ott.gr.432	Vatican City	Vatican	INTF
392	12th	Theophylact Commentary on the Gospels	385	Vatican Library, Barb.gr.521, fol. 7-391	Vatican City	Vatican	INTF
393	14th	Gospels, Acts, Pauline Epistles, General Epistles	222	Vallicelliana Library, ms.E. 22	Rome	Italy	INTF
394	1330	Gospels, Acts, Pauline Epistles, General Epistles	344	Vallicelliana Library, ms.F. 17	Rome	Italy	IC
394	1330	Gospels, Acts, Pauline Epistles, General Epistles	344	Vallicelliana Library, ms.F. 17	Rome	Italy	INTF
394	1330	Gospels, Acts, Pauline Epistles, General Epistles	344	Vallicelliana Library, ms.F. 17	Rome	Italy	CSNTM
395	12th	Gospels	170	Casanata Library, 165	Rome	Italy	INTF
396	12th	Gospels†	115	Vatican Library, Chig.R.IV.6	Vatican City	Vatican	INTF
397	10th/11th	John	295	Vallicelliana Library, ms.E. 40	Rome	Italy	IC
397	10th/11th	John	295	Vallicelliana Library, ms.E. 40	Rome	Italy	INTF
398	10th	Acts†, Pauline Epistles†, General Epistles	251	Cambridge University Library, Kk. 6.4	Cambridge	UK	CUDL, INTF, CSNTM
399	9th/10th	Gospels	214	National Library of Russia, Gr. 220	Saint Petersburg	Russia	INTF, CSNTM
400	15th	Matthew† 12:29-13:2, Acts†, Pauline Epistles†, General Epistles	249	Berlin State Library, Diez. A. Doud. 10	Berlin	Germany	INTF

[top]

== Gallery ==
Some manuscripts

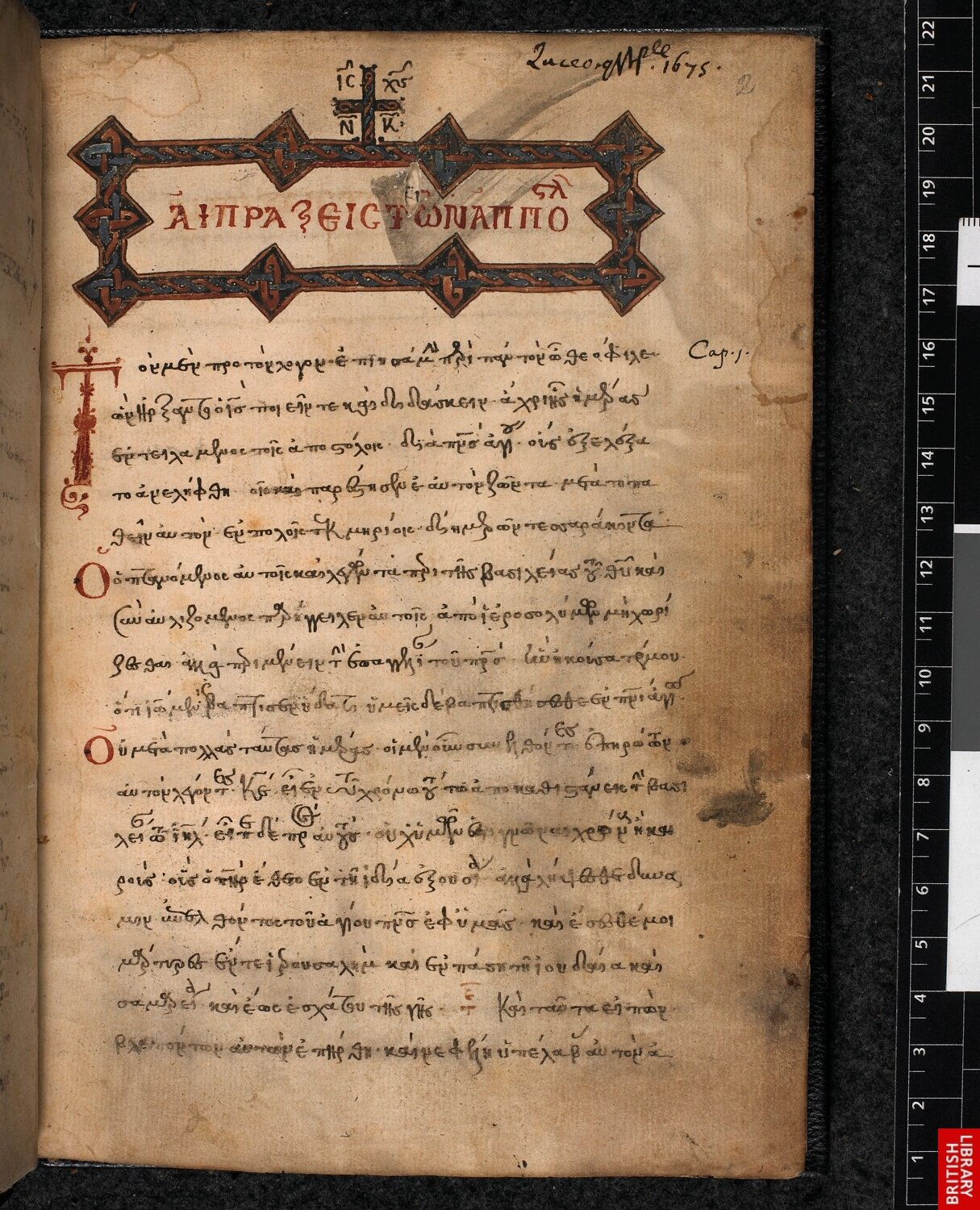
First page from the Acts of the Apostles in Minuscule 322

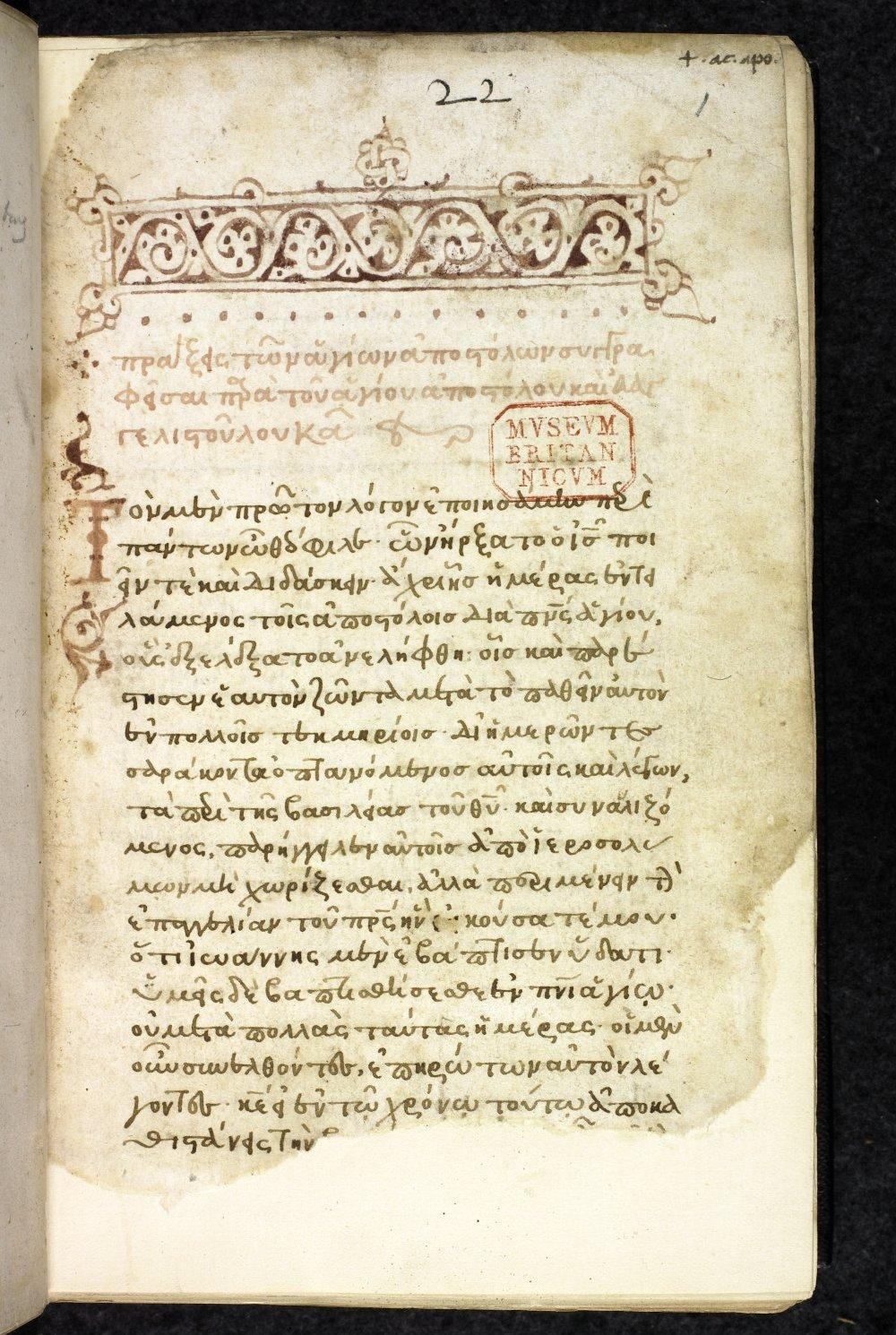
Minuscule 385

== See also ==
- List of New Testament papyri
- List of New Testament uncials
- List of New Testament minuscules (1–1000)
- List of New Testament minuscules (1001–2000)
- List of New Testament minuscules (2001–)
- List of New Testament minuscules ordered by Location/Institution
- List of New Testament lectionaries

== Bibliography ==
- Aland, Kurt; M. Welte; B. Köster; K. Junack (1994). Kurzgefasste Liste der griechischen Handschriften des Neues Testaments. Berlin, New York: Walter de Gruyter. p. 95. ISBN 3-11-011986-2.
- "Liste Handschriften". Münster: Institute for New Testament Textual Research.
