= Minuscule 370 =

- New Testament manuscript
- Text: Gospels
- Date: 14th century
- Script: Greek
- Now at: Biblioteca Riccardiana
- Cite: Lammi, De eruditione Apostolorum (1738)
- Size: 28 cm by 19 cm
- Category: none
- Note: marginalia

Minuscule 370 is a Greek minuscule manuscript of the New Testament, made of paper. It is designated by the siglum 370 in the Gregory-Aland numbering of New Testament manuscripts, and ε 41 in the von Soden numbering of New Testament manuscripts. Using the study of comparative writing styles (palaeography), it has been assigned to the 14th century. It contains marginal notes.

== Description ==
The manuscript is a codex (precursor to the modern book format), containing the text of the four Gospels on 437 paper leaves (sized 28 cm by 19 cm) with some missing sections: Matthew 1:1-17; John 16:29-21:25. The text is written in one column per page, in 34 lines per page.

The text is divided according to the chapters (known as κεφαλαια / kephalaia), whose numbers are given in the margin, and their titles (known as τιτλοι / titloi) written at the top of the pages. There is also a division according to the Ammonian Sections, but there are no references to the Eusebian Canons. It contains Argumentum, lectionary markings in the margin, and a commentary of Theophylact.

== Text ==
The Greek text of the codex is considered to be a representative of the Byzantine text-type. Biblical scholar Kurt Aland did not place the Greek text of the codex in any Category. It was not examined by using the Claremont Profile Method (a specific analysis of textual data).

== History ==
The earliest history of the manuscript is unknown. It was described by Giovanni Lami in 1738, alongside minsucules 201 and 362. It was added to the list of New Testament manuscripts by textual critic Johann M. A. Scholz (1794-1852).

It was examined by biblical scholar and clergyman Dean Burgon. Biblical scholar Caspar René Gregory saw it in 1886.

The manuscript is currently dated by the INTF to the 14th century. It is presently located at the Biblioteca Riccardiana (shelf number 5) in Florence.

== See also ==
- Minuscule 371
- Minuscule 369
- List of New Testament minuscules
- Biblical manuscript
- Textual criticism
