= Minuscule 446 =

15th century New Testament minuscule

- New Testament manuscript
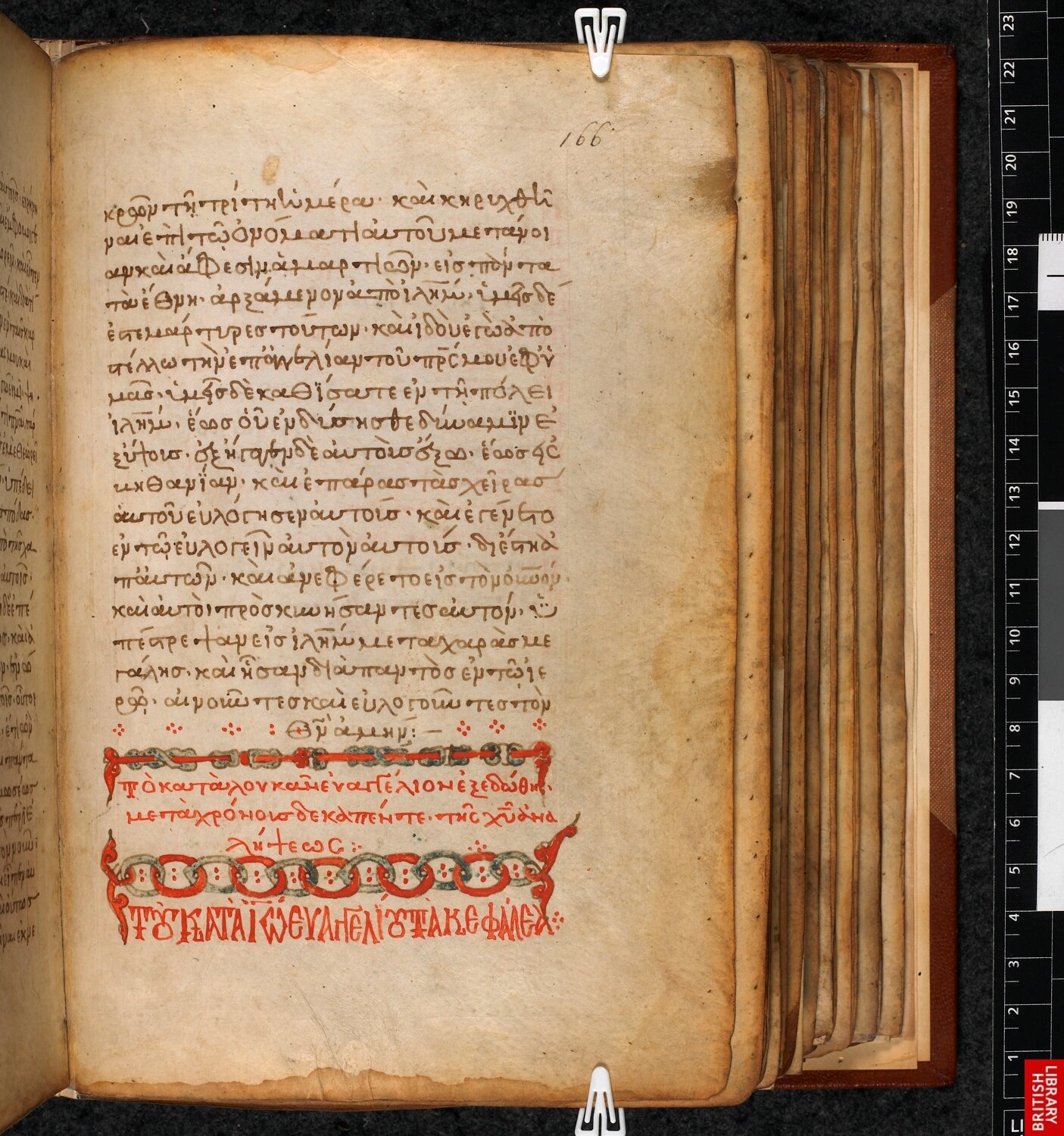
- Folio 166 recto
- Name: Codex Harleianus 5777
- Text: Gospels †
- Date: 15th century
- Script: Greek
- Now at: British Library
- Cite: Wright, Fontes Harleiani
- Size: 22.9 cm by 15 cm
- Type: Byzantine text-type
- Category: V
- Note: marginalia

Minuscule 446 (in the Gregory-Aland numbering), ε 507 (in the Soden numbering), is a Greek minuscule manuscript of the New Testament, on parchment. Palaeographically it has been assigned to the 15th century. The text represents the Byzantine textual tradition. The manuscript was prepared for liturgical use.

== Description ==
The codex contains almost complete text of the four Gospels on 228 parchment leaves (22.9 cm by 15 cm) with some lacunae (Matthew 1:1-17; 26:47-27:40; Mark 1:1-9; Luke 1:1-18; John 1:1-21). All lacunae were made by a man who mischievously cut out the ornamented headpieces at the beginning of each Gospel. In modern time two unfoliated parchment leaves, and two paper fly-leaves were added at the beginning and end.

The text is written in one column per page, in 25 lines per page. The letters are clearly but unskilfully written. The manuscript is decorated, with geometric, occasionally with zoomorphic decorations, in brown and red. The initial letters, titles, colophons, and rubrics in red.

The text is divided according to the κεφαλαια (chapters), whose numbers are given at the margin, and their τιτλοι (titles) at the top of the pages. There is also a division according to the smaller Ammonian Sections (in Mark 232 sections, last in 16:6). It has no references to the Eusebian Canons.

It contains tables of the κεφαλαια (tables of contents) before each Gospel, lectionary markings at the margin (for liturgical use), Synaxarion, Menologion, and subscriptions at the end of each Gospel.

== Text ==
The Greek text of the codex is a representative of the Byzantine text-type. Aland placed it in Category V. According to the Claremont Profile Method it represents textual family K^{x} in Luke 1 (fragmentary), Luke 10, and Luke 20. It belongs also to the textual cluster 1213 (minuscule 1213 is the lead manuscript of this cluster).

== History ==
The original manuscript contained dated colophon, but it was erased by a later hand. The manuscript is dated by the INTF to the 15th century. The manuscript probably was rewritten from minuscule 65.

The manuscript was brought by John Covel, British chaplain, from Constantinople to England (along with minuscule 110 and other manuscripts). It was designated as Covel's 5. Then – in 1715 or 1716 – the manuscript was sold to Robert Harley, and to his son Edward Harley. In 1753 it was purchased along with other manuscripts of collection by the British Museum.

The manuscript was added to the list of New Testament manuscripts by Scholz (1794-1852). It was examined by Covell, Scholz (only Mark 5), Bloomfield, and C. R. Gregory in 1883.

The manuscript was rebound in 1964.

It is currently housed at the British Library (Harley MS 5777).

== See also ==
- List of New Testament minuscules
- Biblical manuscript
- Textual criticism
