= Minuscule 310 =

- New Testament manuscript
- Text: Gospel of Matthew †
- Date: 12th century
- Script: Greek
- Now at: National Library of France
- Size: 31 cm by 20.5 cm
- Type: Byzantine text-type
- Category: V

Minuscule 310 is a Greek minuscule manuscript of the New Testament, made of parchment. It is designated by the siglum 310 in the Gregory-Aland numbering of New Testament manuscripts, and N^{μ21} in the von Soden numbering of New Testament manuscripts. Using the study of comparative writing styles (palaeography), it has been assigned to the 12th century.

== Description ==
The manuscript is a codex (precursor to the modern book format), containing the text of the Gospel of Matthew on 378 parchment leaves (sized 31 cm by 20.5 cm), with sizeable gaps: missing 12:38-163, 16:5-end. The text is written in one column per page, in 27 lines per page. The biblical text is surrounded by a catena biblical commentary.

== Text ==
The Greek text of the codex is considered to be a representative of the Byzantine text-type. BIblical scholar Kurt Aland placed it in Category V of his New Testament manuscript classification system. Category V manuscripts are described as "manuscripts with a purely or predominantly Byzantine text."

== History ==
The earliest history of the manuscript is unknown. It was presented by Provost Arsenius to St. Saba's monastery. It was added to the list of New Testament manuscripts by textual critic Johann M. A. Scholz (1794-1852). It was examined and described by scholar Paulin Martin. Biblical scholar Caspar René Gregory saw the manuscript in 1885.

The manuscript is currently dated by the INTF to the 12th century. It is presently located at the National Library of France (shelf number Gr. 202) in Paris.

== See also ==
- Minuscule 311
- Minuscule 309
- List of New Testament minuscules
- Biblical manuscript
- Textual criticism
