= L113 =

L113 may refer to:

- Scania L113, a bus model
- Lectionary 113, a Greek manuscript of the New Testament
- Children's Corner, a suite for solo piano by Claude Debussy completed in 1908
