= Minuscule 64 =

Greek minuscule manuscript of the New Testament

- New Testament manuscript
- Text: Gospels
- Date: 12th century
- Script: Greek
- Now at: Schøyen Collection
- Size: 11.5 cm by 8 cm
- Type: Byzantine text-type
- Category: none
- Note: full marginalia

Minuscule 64, formerly known as Ussher 2, is a Greek minuscule manuscript of the New Testament, made of parchment. It is designated by the siglum 64 in the Gregory-Aland numbering of New Testament manuscripts, and as ε 1287 in the von Soden numbering of New Testament manuscripts. Using the study of comparative writing styles (palaeography), it has been assigned to the 12th century. The manuscript has complex contents and full marginal notes.

== Description ==
The manuscript is a codex (precursor to the modern book format), containing the complete text of the four Gospels on 444 parchment leaves (sized 11.5 cm by 8 cm), and compiled into two volumes. The first volume comprises leaves 1-209; volume 2 leaves 210-444. The text is written in one column per page, 18 lines per page. As the manuscript is quite small, it was likely created for personal use.

The text is divided according to the chapters (known as κεφαλαια / kephalaia), whose numbers are given in the margin, and their titles (known as τιτλοι / titloi) written at the top of the pages. There is a division according to the Ammonian Sections (241 in Mark, the last in 16:20), with references to the Eusebian Canons. There are also headpieces for titles in red ink, and small initials at the beginning of each gospel in gold ink.

It contains the Epistle to Carpius, Eusebian Canon tables at the beginning illuminated in blue, green, gold, and red ink, tables of contents (also known as κεφαλαια) before each Gospel, lectionary markings in the margin (for liturgical use) in red ink, and a synaxaria. Subscriptions with numbers of verses were added by a later hand.

== Text ==
The Greek text of the codex is considered to be a representative of the Byzantine text-type. Biblical scholar Kurt Aland did not place it in any Category of his New Testament Manuscript system. According to the Claremont Profile Method (a specific analysis of textual data), it represents textual cluster 121 in Luke 1, Luke 10, and Luke 20.

== History ==
The earliest history of the manuscript is unknown. It belonged to Thomas Goade (d. 1638), then to Archbishop James Ussher. In 1702 it was presented together with minuscule 61 and 63 to Trinity College in Dublin (along with the codices 61 and 63). Then towards to the end of the 17th century it belonged to one John Jones. It subsequently found its way to be included into the Schøyen Collection (shelf number Ms 230), in Oslo.

In 1880 Dean Burgon found the manuscript in the library of the Marquis of Bute (Marquess of Bute, Ms. 82 G. 18/19). It was collated, like 63, by Dodwell, used by Brian Walton in his Polyglotte (as Em), and used by scholar John Mill (as Usser. 2). Biblical scholar Caspar René Gregory saw it in 1883.

It is currently dated by the INTF to the 12th century. In 2011 the manuscript was purchased from the Schøyen Collection by the Green Collection (owned by Hobby Lobby), and donated to the Museum of the Bible, where it is presently housed. In 2026, the CSNTM published digital colour images of the manuscript.

== See also ==
- Minuscule 65
- Minuscule 63
- List of New Testament minuscules
- Biblical manuscript
- Textual criticism
