= Erminia (given name) =

Erminia is a feminine given name. It is related to the name Armina, the feminine form of Herman or Armand, which means soldier (derived from German, literally "army man").

Erminia was a character in Tasso's medieval epic poem Jerusalem Delivered. It is sometimes given as Hermine or Herminie.

== People with the given name Erminia ==
- Erminia Caudana (1896–1974), Italian restorer
- Erminia Frezzolini (1818—1884), Italian opera singer
- Erminia Giuliano (born 1955), member of the Giuliano clan of the Camorra
- Erminia Perfetto (born 1995), Italian karateka
- Erminia Russo (born 1964), Canadian volleyball player

== See also ==
- Erminia (disambiguation)
