= Giovanni Lessi =

Italian jurist, economist, agronomist and erudite scholar

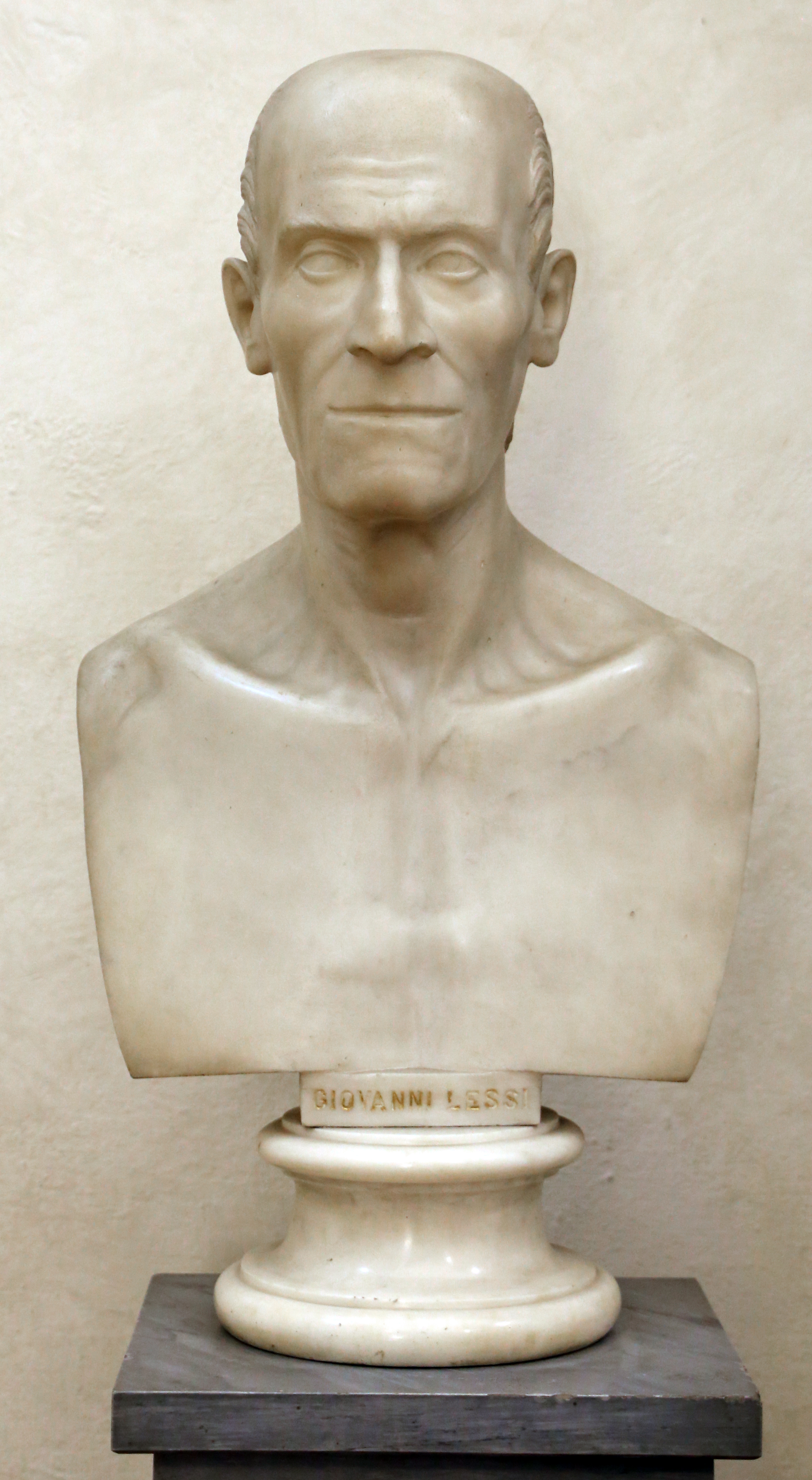
- Bust of Giovanni Lessi in the Sala dei Georgofili of the Uffizi
- Born: 4 August 1743; Florence, Grand Duchy of Tuscany
- Died: 12 October 1817 (aged 74)
- Education: University of Pisa
- Occupations: Jurist, Economist, Agronomist, Scholar
- Known for: Advocacy for free trade, Contributions to Italian language dictionary

Giovanni Lessi (4 August 1743 – 12 October 1817) was an Italian jurist, economist, agronomist, and erudite scholar of classics who lived in Florence.

== Biography ==
He was born in Florence to a family of comfortable means; his uncle, Jacopo Lessi, was a priest and poet, as well as a good friend of the scholar Giovanni Lami. After his father died in 1761, Giovanni studied at the University of Pisa. He initially worked as a lawyer under Giovanni Paolo Ombrosi. He was a member of the Accademia della Crusca and of the Colombaria. For the former, he served as a librarian and member of the committee maintaining a dictionary of the Italian language. As a member of the Accademia dei Georgofili, he penned some manuscripts on means of encouraging commerce: Della inefficacia e dei dannosi effetti delle leggi, che escludono dagli Stati le manifatture estere (1791). The treatise argues for free trade. In 1795, he published a treatise on Prospetto per l'erezione di un banco di sconto, urging the establishment of lending institutions. He also published on means of encouraging certain agricultural enterprises. Most of the publications were part of the journals of the academies.

In 1805, the bankruptcy of the prominent Riccardi family, which led to the sale and dispersal of its art and book collection. This led to significant impoverishment of Lessi, whose assets were linked to those of the family. It is said that it prompted multiple suicide attempts.

== Sources ==
- Vannini, Fabrizio (2005). "LESSI, Giovanni". Dizionario Biografico degli Italiani (in Italian). Vol. 64: Latilla–Levi Montalcini. Rome: Istituto dell'Enciclopedia Italiana. ISBN 978-88-12-00032-6.
