= Minuscule 362 =

- New Testament manuscript
- Text: Gospel of Luke 6:29-12:10
- Date: 13th century
- Script: Greek
- Now at: Laurentian Library
- Size: 33.6 cm by 23.5 cm
- Type: Byzantine text-type
- Category: V

Minuscule 362 (in the Gregory-Aland numbering), Ν^{λ37} (Soden), is a Greek minuscule manuscript of the New Testament, on parchment. Palaeographically it has been assigned to the 13th century.

== Description ==
The codex contains the text of the Gospel of Luke 6:29-12:10 on 314 parchment leaves (33.6 cm by 23.5 cm) with catena (from Chrysostomos, Gregory of Nazianzus, Gregory of Nyssa, Isidor, Theodoret, etc.). It is written in one column per page, in 32 lines per page, in red ink.

== Text ==
The Greek text of the codex is a representative of the Byzantine text-type. Aland placed it in Category V. It has some unusual readings. It was not examined by Claremont Profile Method.

== History ==
The manuscript was cited together with codices 201 and 370 by Giovanni Lami in De eruditione Apostolorum (Florence, 1738, p. 239). It was described by Bernard de Montfaucon, who gave for it 13th century.

The manuscript was added to the list of New Testament manuscripts by Scholz (1794-1852). It was examined by Philip E. Pusey and Burgon. C. R. Gregory saw it in 1886.

The manuscript is currently housed at the Biblioteca Laurentiana (Conv. Soppr. 176) in Florence.

== See also ==
- List of New Testament minuscules
- Biblical manuscript
- Textual criticism
