= Minuscule 328 =

- New Testament manuscript
- Name: Lugduno-Batav.
- Text: Acts, Cath., Paul
- Date: 13th century
- Script: Greek
- Now at: Leiden University Library
- Size: 18.3 cm by 13.4 cm
- Type: Byzantine text-type
- Category: V

Minuscule 328 (in the Gregory-Aland numbering), α 358 (Soden), is a Greek minuscule manuscript of the New Testament, on parchment. Paleographically it has been assigned to the 13th century.

Formerly it was assigned by 38^{a}, 44^{p}.

== Description ==
The codex contains the text of the Acts of the Apostles, Catholic epistles, and Pauline epistles on 215 parchment leaves (18.3 cm by 13.4 cm). The text is written in one column per page, in 22 lines per page.

It contains Prolegomena, Synaxarion, Menologion, αναγνωσεις (lessons), subscriptions at the end of each book, with numbers of stichoi.

== Text ==
The Greek text of the codex is a representative of the Byzantine text-type. Aland assigned it to the Category V.

In Acts 12:25 it reads εις Αντιοχειαν (to Antioch) along with 97^{mg}, 110, 424^{mg}, 425^{c}; majority reads εις Ιερουσαλημ (to Jerusalem);

== History ==
The manuscript once belonged to Paul Petavius, a Councillor of Paris. Claude Sarrau saw it in 1647. Christina, Queen of Sweden, bought it from Erben Petavus in 1650 and presented it to Isaac Vossius († 1688). Gachon collated the text of manuscript for Sarrau. This collation belonged later to Cottier.

The text of the manuscript was examined by John Mill (as Pet. 1), Johann Jakob Wettstein (1717, 1731), and Dermout. C. R. Gregory saw it in 1888.

Formerly it was assigned by 38^{a}, 44^{p}. In 1908 Gregory gave the number 328 to it.

The manuscript is currently housed at the Leiden University Library (Voss. Gr. Q. 77) at Leiden.

== See also ==
- List of New Testament minuscules
- Biblical manuscript
- Textual criticism
