= Erminia (disambiguation) =

Erminia is a character in Gerusalemme liberata by Torquato Tasso.

Erminia may also refer to:

- Erminia (given name), list of people with this name
- 705 Erminia, an asteroid
- Erminia, a common misspelling of the tortrix moth genus Erminea, nowadays considered a junior synonym of Cydia
- "Erminia" (song), a song by Juan Crisóstomo Arriaga
- Erminia, a serenade by Scarlatti

== See also ==
- Erminia and the Shepherds, a painting by Guercino based on Tasso's poem
