= Minuscule 305 =

Greek minuscule manuscript of the New Testament

- New Testament manuscript
- Text: Gospels †
- Date: 13th century
- Script: Greek
- Now at: Bibliothèque nationale de France
- Size: 31.4 cm by 23 cm
- Type: Byzantine text-type
- Category: V
- Note: marginalia

Minuscule 305 (in the Gregory-Aland numbering), Z^{ε30} (Soden), is a Greek minuscule manuscript of the New Testament, on cotton paper. Paleographically it has been assigned to the 13th century. It has marginalia.

== Description ==
The codex contains the text of the four Gospels on 261 cotton paper leaves (31.4 cm by 23 cm) with one lacuna (John 21:6-25). The text is written in one column per page, in 51-54 lines per page.

The text is divided according to the κεφαλαια (chapters), whose numbers are given at the margin, and the τιτλοι (titles of chapters) at the top of the pages. There is also a division according to the Ammonian Sections, but added by a later hand.

It contains tables of the κεφαλαια (tables of contents) before each Gospel. Lectionary markings at the margin, and incipits were added by a later hand. The biblical text is surrounded by a catena of the authorship of Euthymius Zigabenus.

The text of John 21:6-25 was added by a later hand.

== Text ==
The Greek text of the codex is a representative of the Byzantine text-type. Aland placed it in Category V.

It was not examined by the Claremont Profile Method.

== History ==
The manuscript once belonged to Cardinal Mazarin (along with minuscule 14, 311, 313, and 324).

It was added to the list of New Testament manuscripts by Scholz (1794-1852). The manuscript was examined by Wettstein, Scholz, and Martin. C. R. Gregory saw the manuscript in 1885.

The manuscript is currently housed at the Bibliothèque nationale de France (Gr. 195) at Paris.

== See also ==
- List of New Testament minuscules
- Biblical manuscript
- Textual criticism
