= Minuscule 341 =

- New Testament manuscript
- Text: Gospels
- Date: 1296
- Script: Greek
- Now at: Turin National University Library
- Size: 15.3 cm by 12 cm
- Category: none
- Note: marginalia

Minuscule 341 (in the Gregory-Aland numbering), ε 315 (Soden), is a Greek minuscule manuscript of the New Testament, on parchment. It is dated by a colophon to the year 1296. It was adapted for liturgical use.

== Description ==
The codex contains a complete text of the four Gospels on 268 parchment leaves (15.3 cm by 12 cm). It is written in one column per page, in 24 lines per page.

It contains the Epistula ad Carpianum at the beginning, tables of the κεφαλαια (tables of contents) before each Gospel, lectionary markings at the margin for liturgical use, and the Synaxarion.

Kurt Aland did not place the Greek text of the codex in any Category. It was not examined by the Claremont Profile Method.

== History ==
The manuscript was written by Nicetas Mauron, a reader. It was examined by Passino, Scholz, and Burgon. It was added to the list of New Testament manuscripts by Scholz (1794-1852). C. R. Gregory saw it in 1886.

The manuscript is currently housed at the Turin National University Library (B. VII. 14) in Turin.

== See also ==
- List of New Testament minuscules
- Biblical manuscript
- Textual criticism
