= Minuscule 340 =

- New Testament manuscript
- Text: Gospels
- Date: 14th century
- Script: Greek
- Now at: Turin National University Library
- Size: 14.8 cm by 10.6 cm
- Category: none
- Note: marginalia

Minuscule 340 is a Greek minuscule manuscript of the New Testament, made of parchment. It is designated by the siglum 340 in the Gregory-Aland numbering of New Testament manuscripts, and ε 416 in the von Soden numbering of New Testament manuscripts. Using the study of comparative writing styles (palaeography), it has been assigned to the 14th century. It has marginal notes.

== Description ==
The manuscript is a codex (precursor to the modern book format), containing the complete text of the four Gospels on 243 parchment leaves (sized 14.8 cm by 10.6 cm). It is written in one column per page, in 21-22 lines per page. It has a lot of later corrections.

Though the original manuscript didn't include any chapter divisions or sections, a later hand has added two systems of division. The first is a division according to the chapters (known as κεφαλαια / kephalaia), whose numbers are given in the margin, and their titles (known as τιτλοι / titloi) written at the top of the pages. The second is a division according to the Ammonian Sections, with references to the Eusebian Canons. It contains chapter tables (known as κεφαλαια / kephalaia) before each Gospel. The later hand marked church lessons at the beginning by incipits, for liturgical use.

== Text ==
The Greek text of this codex is considered to be a representative of the Byzantine text type. Biblical scholarKurt Aland did not place the Greek text of the codex in any Category. It was not examined by the Claremont Profile Method (a specific analysis of textual data).

== History ==
The earliest history of the manuscript is unknown. It was added to the list of New Testament manuscripts by textual critic Johann M. A. Scholz (1794-1852). It was examined by scholars Pasino, Scholz, and biblical scholar and clergyman Dean Burgon. Biblical scholar Caspar René Gregory saw it in 1886.

The manuscript is currently dated by the INTF to the 14th century. It is presently located at the Turin National University Library (shelf number B. VII. 16) in Turin.

== See also ==
- List of New Testament minuscules
- Biblical manuscript
- Textual criticism
