= Minuscule 63 =

Greek minuscule manuscript of the New Testament

- New Testament manuscript
- Name: Ussher 1
- Text: Gospels
- Date: 10th century
- Script: Greek
- Now at: Trinity College
- Size: 31.8 cm by 24 cm
- Type: Byzantine text-type
- Category: V
- Note: marginalia

Minuscule 63 (in the Gregory-Aland numbering), A 118 (von Soden), formerly known as Ussher 1, is a Greek minuscule manuscript of the New Testament, on parchment leaves. Palaeographically it has been assigned to the 10th century. It has marginalia.

== Description ==
The codex contains almost complete text of the four Gospels on 237 parchment leaves (size 31.8 cm by 24 cm) with only one small lacunae. The text is written in one column per page, 18-24 lines per page. The initial letters are written in red. It contains commentaries written in 48-52 lines per page.

The text is divided according to the numbers of the κεφαλαια (chapters), whose numbers are given at the margin, and the τιτλοι (titles) at the top of the pages. There is also a division according to the Ammonian Sections (Matt 355; Mark 234; Luke 342; John 241), whose numbers are given at the margin, with references to Eusebian Canons (written below Ammonian Section numbers).

It contains Prolegomena, tables of the κεφαλαια (tables of contents) before each Gospel, Synaxarion, subscriptions at the end of each Gospel, and pictures.

The last leaf, containing John 21:25, was lost. Folio IV belongs to the lectionary 454 (Gregory-Aland).

== Text ==
The Greek text of the codex is a representative of the Byzantine text-type. Aland placed it in Category V. It was not examined by the Claremont Profile Method.

The Pericope Adulterae (John 7:53-8:11) is omitted.

== History ==
The manuscript once belonged to Ussher (along with codex 61).

A few extracts were contributed by Henry Dodwell, just like 64, to Bishop Fell's New Testament of 1675. It was examined by Richard Bulkeley for Mill, Dobbin (in 1855), and John Twycrosse (1858). C. R. Gregory saw it in 1883.

It is currently housed in Trinity College (Ms. 31, fol. 1-237), in Dublin.

== See also ==
- List of New Testament minuscules
- Biblical manuscript
- Textual criticism
- Codex Ussher 2
