= Lectionary 97 =

Lectionary ℓ 97
- New Testament manuscript
- Text: Apostolos
- Date: 14th-century
- Script: Greek
- Now at: Bibliothèque nationale de France
- Size: 18.6 cm by 12.8 cm

Lectionary 97, designated by siglum ℓ 97 (in the Gregory-Aland numbering), is a Greek manuscript of the New Testament, on parchment leaves. Palaeographically it has been assigned to the 14th-century.

== Description ==
The codex contains lessons from the Acts of the Apostles and epistles lectionary (Apostolos) with some lacunae. It is written in Greek minuscule letters, on 145 parchment leaves (18.6 cm by 12.8 cm). The writing stands in one column per page, 29 lines per page. On folios 140-145 it contains Menologion.

== History ==
The manuscript was added to the list of New Testament manuscripts by Scholz.

The manuscript is not cited in the critical editions of the Greek New Testament (UBS3).

Currently the codex is located in the Bibliothèque nationale de France (Gr. 376, fol. 1–145) in Paris.

Folios 146-315 are now classified as another codex – minuscule 324.

== See also ==
- List of New Testament lectionaries
- Biblical manuscript
- Textual criticism
