= Minuscule 333 =

- New Testament manuscript
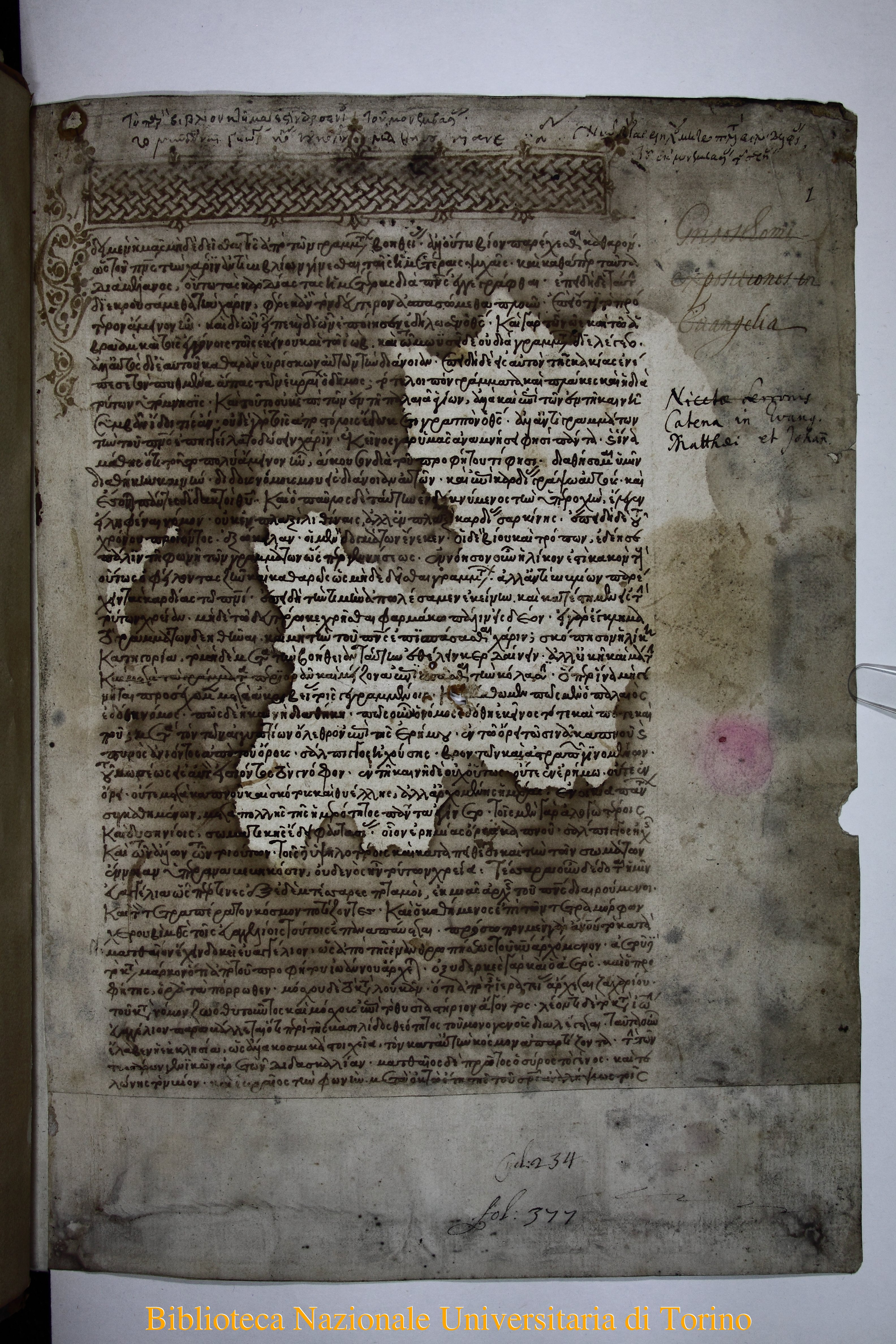
- Text: Matthew, John
- Date: 1214
- Script: Greek
- Now at: Turin National University Library
- Size: 33.7 cm by 26 cm
- Category: none

Minuscule 333 (in the Gregory-Aland numbering), N^{μ230} and N^{ι230} (Soden), is a Greek minuscule manuscript of the New Testament, on cotton paper. It is dated by a colophon to the year 1214.

== Description ==
The codex contains the text of the Gospel of Matthew and Gospel of John on 377 paper leaves (33.7 cm by 26 cm) with a Commentary. The text is written in one column per page, in 40-50 lines per page. The biblical text is surrounded by Nicetas catenae.

Aland did not place the Greek text of the codex in any Category.

== History ==
The manuscript once belonged to Arsenius, Archbishop of Monembasia, in the Morea (as Lectionary 113), then to Gabriel, metropolitan of Philadelphia. At the end of the 16th century it came to Italy. It was added to the list of New Testament manuscripts by Scholz (1794–1852). C. R. Gregory saw it in 1886.

The manuscript is currently housed at the Turin National University Library (B. I. 9) in Turin.

== See also ==
- List of New Testament minuscules
- Biblical manuscript
- Textual criticism
- Minuscule 332
