= Minuscule 15 =

Greek minuscule manuscript of the New Testament

- New Testament manuscript
- Text: Gospels
- Date: 12th century
- Script: Greek
- Now at: Bibliothèque nationale de France
- Size: 18.2 cm by 14.3 cm
- Type: Byzantine text-type
- Category: V
- Note: Full marginalia

Minuscule 15 is a Greek minuscule manuscript of the New Testament Gospels, written on parchment. It is designated by the siglum 15 in the Gregory-Aland numbering of New Testament manuscripts, and as ε 283 in the von Soden numbering of New Testament manuscripts. Using the study of comparative writing styles (palaeography), it is assigned to the 12th century. It has liturgical books and full marginal notes.

== Description ==
The manuscript is a codex (precursor to the modern book format), containing the complete text of the four Gospels, written on 225 parchment leaves, sized 18.2 cm by 14.3 cm. The text is written in one column per page, 23-24 lines per page. It was written in neat, and regular letters. The first three pages are written in gold ink, with "exquisite miniatures", four on page two, four on page three.

The text is divided according to the chapters (known as κεφαλαια / kephalai), whose numbers are given in the margin, with their titles (known as τιτλοι / titloi) at the top of the pages. There is also a division according to the Ammonian Sections, with references to the Eusebian Canons which are written below Ammonian Section numbers (both early divisions of the Gospels into sections). The copyist has included what is known as the 'iota adscriptum' to the main text.

It contains Prolegomena (introductions), Epistle to Carpainus, Eusebian Canon tables, tables of contents (also known as κεφαλαια) before each Gospel, lectionary equipment at the margin (for liturgical use), and pictures. It also contains liturgical books with hagiographies: the synaxarion and Menologion (lists of Saint's days and lives).

== Text ==
The Greek text of the codex is considered to be a representative of the Byzantine text-type. Textual critic Hermann von Soden classified it to A^{k} (the Byzantine commentated text). Biblical scholar Kurt Aland placed it in Category V of his New Testament manuscript classification system. According to the Claremont Profile Method (a specific analysis of textaul data), it belongs to the textual family K^{x} in Luke 1 and Luke 20. In Luke 10 no profile was made.

In the margin of Mark 16:8 it has a scholion which questions the authenticity of the remains verses of the Gospel: εν τισι των αντιγραφων, εως ωδε πληρουται ο ευαγγελιστης. εν πολλοις δε, και ταυτα φερεται (It certain copies, the Gospel is present up to here. But in many others, also these [verses] are included). The text of the pericope John 7:53-8:11 is omitted.

== History ==
The earliest history of the manuscript is unknown. It was brought to Paris by Catherine de' Medici. It was in private hands, and became one of the manuscripts used by Ludolph Kuster in his revised reprint of John Mill's Novum Testamentum Graecum (Paris 8).

Biblical scholar Johann M. A. Scholz examined a bigger part of Matthew, Mark and John in the codex. It was examined and described by biblical scholars Dean Burgon and Paulin Martin. C. R. Gregory saw the manuscript in 1884.

Scholz dated it to the 10th century, Gregory to the 12th century. It is currently dated by the INTF to the 12th century.

The codex is presently located at the National Library of France (shelf number Gr. 64) in Paris.

== See also ==
- Minuscule 16
- Minuscule 14
- List of New Testament minuscules
- Textual criticism
