= Minuscule 332 =

- New Testament manuscript
- Name: Codex Taurinensis
- Text: Gospels
- Date: 12th century
- Script: Greek
- Now at: Turin National University Library
- Size: 31.1 cm by 23.3 cm
- Category: none
- Note: marginalia

Minuscule 332 (in the Gregory-Aland numbering), A^{209} (Soden), is a Greek minuscule manuscript of the New Testament, on parchment. Paleographically it has been assigned to the 12th century. According to Gregory the 11th century is also possible. It has marginalia.

== Description ==
The codex contains the text of the four Gospels on 304 parchment leaves (31.1 cm by 23.3 cm). The text is written in one column per page, in 33 lines per page.

The text is divided according to the κεφαλαια (chapters), whose numbers are given at the margin, and the τιτλοι (titles of chapters) at the top of the pages.

It contains tables of the κεφαλαια (tables of contents) before each Gospel, pictures, and a commentary (Gospel of Mark – Victorinus).

Kurt Aland did not place the Greek text of the codex in any Category. It was not examined by using the Claremont Profile Method.

== History ==
The manuscript was bound in 1258. It was added to the list of New Testament manuscripts by Scholz (1794-1852). C. R. Gregory saw it in 1886.

The manuscript is currently housed at the Turin National University Library (C. II. 4) in Turin.

== See also ==
- List of New Testament minuscules
- Biblical manuscript
- Textual criticism
- Minuscule 333
