= Minuscule 14 =

Greek minuscule manuscript of the New Testament

- New Testament manuscript
- Text: Gospels †
- Date: 964
- Script: Greek
- Now at: National Library of France
- Size: 17.6 cm by 19.2 cm
- Type: Byzantine text-type
- Category: V

Minuscule 14 (in the Gregory-Aland numbering), ε 1021 (von Soden) is a Greek minuscule manuscript of the New Testament, on 392 parchment leaves (17.6 cm by 19.2 cm), dated by a colophon to the year 964 CE.

== Description ==
The codex contains the text of the four Gospels with some lacunae (Matthew 1:1-9; 3:16-4:9). The leaves are arranged in octavo. Some leaves are in disorder.

The text is written in one column per page, 17 lines per page. It is written in beautiful, and round minuscule letters, the initial letters are in gold and colour. It has regular breathings and accents.

The text is divided into the κεφαλαια (chapters), whose numbers are given at the margin, and their τιτλοι (titles of chapters) at the top of the pages. There is also a division according to the Ammonian Sections (in Mark 233 Sections), whose numbers are given at the margin with references to the Eusebian Canons (written below Ammonian Section numbers).

It contains Paschal Canon, the Epistula ad Carpianum, the Eusebian Canon tables, tables of the κεφαλαια (tables of contents) before each Gospel, and synaxaria.

It has a colophon with the date A.D. 964. Before the discovery of the Uspenski Gospels it was the oldest known dated minuscule.

The texts of Matt 1:1-9; 3:16-4:9 were supplied by a later hand in the 15th century.

== Text ==
The Greek text of the codex is a representative of the Byzantine text-type. Hermann von Soden classified it to the textual family K^{x}. Aland placed it in Category V.

According to the Claremont Profile Method it belongs to the textual family K^{x} in Luke 1 and Luke 20. In Luke 10 no profile was made.

The spurious text of the Pericope Adulterae is marked by an asterisk.

== History ==
According to the colophon the manuscript was εγραφθη νικηφορου βασιλευοντος ινδ, which means 964 AD.

It was in private hands and belonged to Cardinal Mazarin (along with minuscule 305, 311, 313, and 324). It became a part of collection of Kuster (Paris 7). It was examined and described by Bernard de Montfaucon, Wettstein, Scholz, and Burgon. Scholz collated Matthew 7-21; Mark 1-6; Luke 3-4; 9; 11; John 3-9. C. R. Gregory saw the manuscript in 1884.

The codex now is located at the National Library of France (Gr. 70) at Paris.

== See also ==
- Minuscule 15
- Minuscule 13
- List of New Testament minuscules
- Textual criticism
