= Minuscule 324 =

- New Testament manuscript
- Text: Gospels
- Date: 14th century
- Script: Greek
- Now at: Bibliothèque nationale de France
- Size: 18.6 cm by 12.8 cm
- Type: Byzantine text-type
- Category: V
- Note: marginalia

Minuscule 324 (in the Gregory-Aland numbering), ε 452 (Soden), is a Greek minuscule manuscript of the New Testament, on parchment. Paleographically it has been assigned to the 14th century. The margin apparatus is full. The manuscript was prepared for Church reading.

== Description ==
The codex contains the text of the four Gospels on 170 parchment leaves (18.6 cm by 12.8 cm). The text is written in one column per page, in 29 lines per page.

The text is divided according to the κεφαλαια (chapters), whose numbers are given at the margin, and their τιτλοι (titles of chapters) at the top of the pages. There is also another division according to the Ammonian Sections, with references to the Eusebian Canons (written below Ammonian Section numbers).

It contains the Epistula ad Carpianum, tables of the κεφαλαια (tables of contents) before each Gospel, lectionary markings at the margin for liturgical reading, and incipits. Synaxarion, Menologion, and list of Caesars were added by a later hand.

To the same manuscript belongs lectionary 97 (folios 1-145).

== Text ==
The Greek text of the codex is a representative of the Byzantine text-type. Hermann von Soden classified it to the textual family K^{x}. Aland placed it in Category V. According to the Claremont Profile Method it represents K^{x} in Luke 1, Luke 10, and Luke 20.

== History ==
The manuscript formerly belonged to Cardinal Mazarin (as minuscule 14, 305, 311, 313).

It was added to the list of New Testament manuscripts by Scholz (1794-1852). It was examined and described by Scholz (major part of it), Paulin Martin. C. R. Gregory saw the manuscript in 1885.

The manuscript is currently housed at the Bibliothèque nationale de France (Gr. 376, fol. 146-315) at Paris.

== See also ==
- List of New Testament minuscules
- Biblical manuscript
- Textual criticism
