= Minuscule 65 =

Greek minuscule manuscript of the New Testament

- New Testament manuscript
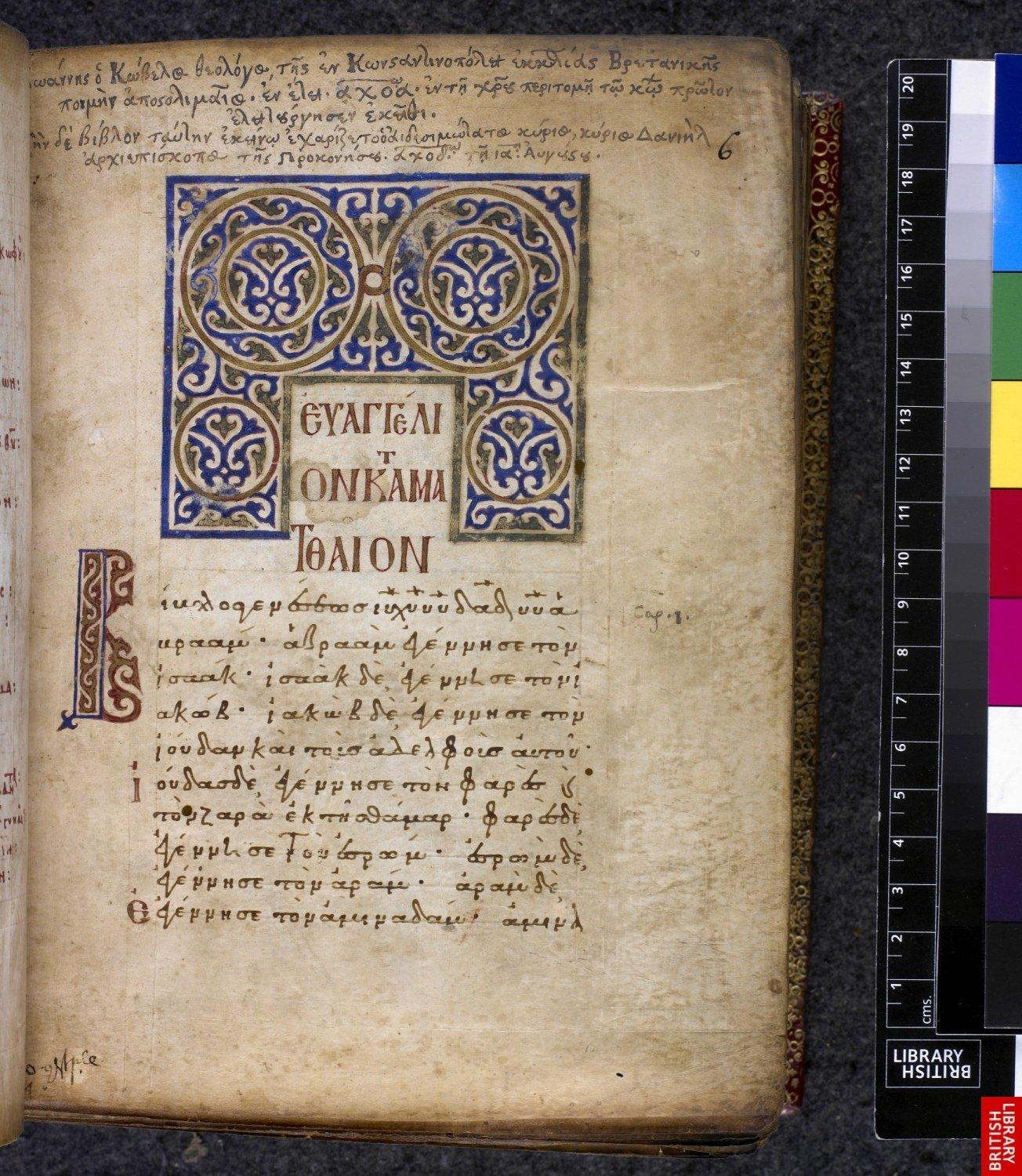
- The first page of the Gospel of Matthew
- Name: Codex Ussher 2 Harley MS 5776
- Text: Gospels
- Date: 11th century
- Script: Greek
- Found: 1674, John Covel
- Now at: British Library
- Size: 22.8 cm by 17.8 cm
- Type: Byzantine text-type
- Category: V
- Note: marginalia

Minuscule 65 (in the Gregory-Aland numbering), ε 135 (von Soden), formerly known as Ussher 2, is a Greek minuscule manuscript of the New Testament, on parchment leaves. Palaeographically it has been assigned to the 11th century. The manuscript has complex contents including marginalia.

== Description ==
The codex contains a complete text of the four Gospels on 309 leaves (size 22.8 cm by 17.8 cm). The last verse in the Gospel of John was supplied by a later hand. The text is written in one column per page, 22 lines per page. There are four decorated head-pieces and ornamental initial letters in colour and gold, one at the beginning of each Gospel.

The text is divided according to the κεφαλαια (chapters), whose numbers are given at the margin, and their τιτλοι (titles of chapters) at the top of the pages. There is also another division according to the smaller Ammonian Sections (in Matthew 355, Mark 234 - 16:9, Luke 342, John 232 sections), whose numbers are given at the margin with references to the Eusebian Canons (written below Ammonian Section numbers).

It contains the Epistula ad Carpianum, the Eusebian Canon tables at the beginning, tables of the κεφαλαια (tables of contents) before each Gospel, subscriptions at the end of each Gospel, with numbers of στιχοι. There are some notes made by later hand at the margin.

== Text ==
The Greek text of the codex is a representative of the Byzantine text-type. Aland placed it in Category V. It is a member of the textual family E (Soden's K^{i}). According to the Claremont Profile Method it represents the textual family K^{x} in Luke 1, Luke 10, and Luke 20.

John 5:3,4 is marked by an obelus.

== History ==
Minuscule 446 probably was rewritten from this manuscript.

In 1674 the archbishop of Proconesus presented this manuscript to John Covel (1637–1722), British chaplain in Constantinople, and in 1677 Covel brought it from Sinai to England along with minuscule 110. Then the manuscript belonged to Robert Harley, and to his son Edward Harley. In 1753 it was purchased along with other manuscripts of the collection by the British Museum.

The manuscript was examined by John Mill (as Cov. 1) and Griesbach. Griesbach allocated to it number 167 on his list. C. R. Gregory saw it in 1883.

It is currently housed at the British Library as a part of the Harleian Collection (Harley MS 5776).

== See also ==
- List of New Testament minuscules
- Biblical manuscript
- Textual criticism
- Codex Ussher 1
