= Minuscule 368 =

- New Testament manuscript
- Name: Codex Richardian 84
- Text: Gospel of John Rev. 1-3 John
- Date: 15th century
- Script: Greek
- Now at: Biblioteca Riccardiana
- Size: 15.5 cm by 10.5 cm
- Type: Byzantine
- Category: V
- Hand: carelessly written

Minuscule 368 (in the Gregory-Aland numbering), ε 531 and α 1501 (Soden), is a Greek minuscule manuscript of the New Testament, on paper. Palaeographically it has been assigned to the 15th century. It contains non-biblical matter.

== Description ==
The codex contains the text of the Gospel of John, Book of Revelation and 1-3 Epistles of John on 96 paper leaves (15.5 cm by 10.5 cm). The leaves are arranged in octavo (eight leaves in quire). The text is written in one column per page, in 21 lines per page.

It contains also the epistles of Plato to Dionysius.

The manuscript is carelessly written.

== Text ==
The Greek text of the codex is a representative of the Byzantine text-type. Aland placed it in Category V.

== History ==
The manuscript formerly belonged to "Cosmae Oricellarii te amicorum".

The manuscript was added to the list of New Testament manuscripts by Scholz (1794–1852). It was examined by Burgon. C. R. Gregory saw it in 1886.

The manuscript is currently housed at the Biblioteca Riccardiana (84) in Florence.

== See also ==
- List of New Testament minuscules
- Biblical manuscript
- Textual criticism
