= John Covel =

English clergyman and scientist (1638–1722)

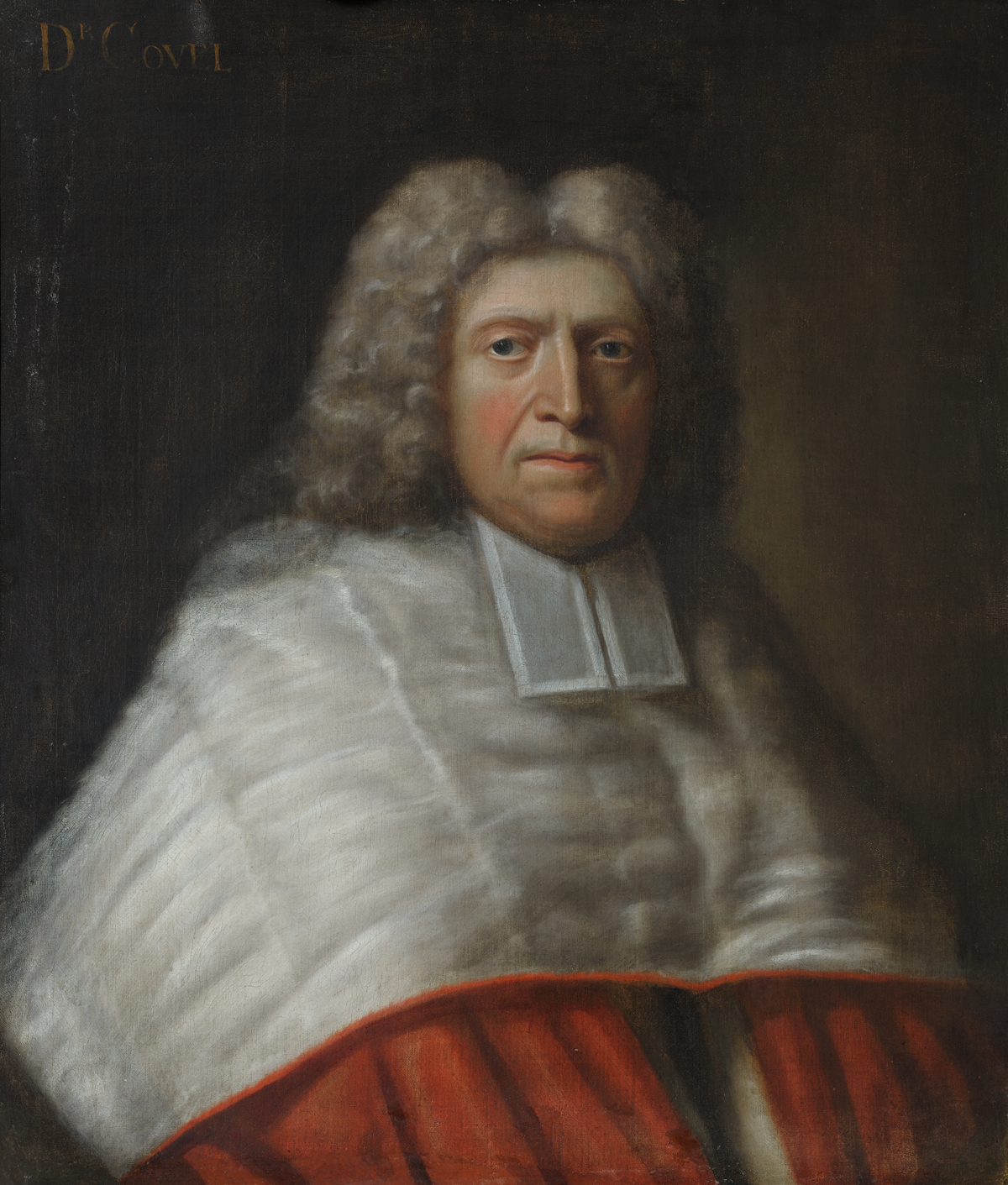
Portrait by Claude Laudius Guynier, 1716

John Covel (2 April 1638 – 19 December 1722) was a clergyman and scientist who became Master of Christ's College, Cambridge and vice-chancellor of the University.

== Diplomacy ==
Born at Horningsheath, Suffolk, the son of William Covel, John Covel was educated at Bury St Edmunds school and Christ's College, Cambridge, where he was made a fellow in 1659. In 1670 he went to Constantinople as Chaplain to the Levant Company. For two years he was in sole charge of the English Embassy there after the previous ambassador died.

== Travel and Scholarship ==
Covel travelled widely in Asia Minor and described the buildings and plants which he saw. He purchased many Greek manuscripts (including codices 65, 110, 321, 322, and ℓ 150).

After his return, Covel spent the winter of 1680/1681 in Suffolk suffering with fever, before becoming Chaplain to the Princess of Orange in The Hague (1681–1685). He was then elected the 15th Master of Christ's in 1688, a position he held until 1723.

In his later years, Covel helped to develop the study of fossils.

Academic offices
Preceded by Ralph Cudworth	Master of Christ's College, Cambridge; 1688–1722	Succeeded by William Towers
