= Lectionary 113 =

Lectionary ℓ 113
- New Testament manuscript
- Text: Evangelistarion
- Date: 13th century
- Script: Greek
- Now at: Biblioteca Laurentiana
- Size: 37 cm by 29.8 cm

Lectionary 113, designated by siglum ℓ 113 (in the Gregory-Aland numbering) is a Greek manuscript of the New Testament, on parchment leaves. Palaeographically it has been assigned to the 13th century.

== Description ==
The codex contains lessons from the Gospels of John, Matthew, Luke lectionary (Evangelistarium) with lacunae at the end. It is written in Greek minuscule letters, on 341 parchment leaves (37 cm by 29.8 cm), in 2 columns per page, 19 lines per page.

Prefixed are verses of Arsenius, Archbishop of Monembasia, addressed to Clement VII (1523–1534).

== History ==
The first 213 leaves were written in the 13th century. The leaves 214-341 were supplemented in the 14th century (or 15th century) by George.

The manuscript once belonged to Arsenius, Archbishop of Monembasia in the Morea (as codex 333.

The manuscript was added to the list of New Testament manuscripts by Scholz.

The manuscript is not cited in the critical editions of the Greek New Testament (UBS3).

Currently the codex is located in the Biblioteca Laurentiana (Plutei VI.2) in Florence.

== See also ==
- List of New Testament lectionaries
- Biblical manuscript
- Textual criticism

== Bibliography ==
- Aland, Kurt; M. Welte; B. Köster; K. Junack (1994). Kurzgefasste Liste der griechischen Handschriften des Neues Testaments. Berlin, New York: Walter de Gruyter. p. 225. ISBN 3-11-011986-2.
- Gregory, Caspar René (1900). Textkritik des Neuen Testamentes. Vol. 1. Leipzig: J.C. Hinrichs. p. 397.
