= Minuscule 327 =

- New Testament manuscript
- Text: Acts, Cath., Paul
- Date: 13th century
- Script: Greek
- Now at: New College, Oxford
- Size: 24 cm by 17.5 cm
- Type: Byzantine text-type
- Category: V

Minuscule 327 (in the Gregory-Aland numbering), O^{36} (Soden), is a Greek minuscule manuscript of the New Testament, on parchment. Paleographically it has been assigned to the 13th century. Formerly it was labelled by 37^{a} and 43^{p}.

== Description ==
The codex contains the text of the Acts, Catholic epistles, and Paul on 298 parchment leaves (24 cm by 17.5 cm) with lacunae (Hebrews 13:21-25). The text is written in one column per page, in 20 lines per page. The order of books: Acts, James, Jude, 1-2 Peter, 1-3 John, Pauline epistles.

It contains Prolegomena, tables of the κεφαλαια (tables of contents) before each sacred book, the τιτλοι (titles of chapters) at the top of the pages, and marginal notes. The text of Hebrews 13:21-25 was supplied by a later hand.

== Text ==
The Greek text of the codex is a representative of the Byzantine text-type. Aland assigned it to the Category V.

== History ==
The manuscript was used by Walton in his Polyglot, and by Mill in his Novum Testamentum (as N. 2). Walton erroneously described it, and after him by Wettstein, as a part of the codex 58, which is a much later manuscript. It was examined by Dobbin. C. R. Gregory saw it in 1883.

Formerly it was labelled by 37^{a} and 43^{p}. In 1908 Gregory gave the number 327 to it.

The manuscript is currently housed at the New College (59) at Oxford.

== See also ==
- List of New Testament minuscules
- Biblical manuscript
- Textual criticism
