= Minuscule 384 =

- New Testament manuscript
- Text: Acts, Catholic epistles, Paul
- Date: 13th century
- Script: Greek
- Now at: British Library
- Size: 25.4 cm by 17 cm
- Type: Byzantine text-type
- Category: V
- Note: marginalia

Minuscule 384 (in the Gregory-Aland numbering), α 355 (Soden), is a Greek minuscule manuscript of the New Testament, on paper. Palaeographically it has been assigned to the 13th century. Formerly it was labeled by 59^{a} and 62^{p}. It has some marginalia.

== Description ==
The codex contains the text of the Acts, Catholic epistles, and Pauline epistles on 132 cotton paper leaves (25.4 cm by 17 cm). The text is written in one column per page, in 36 lines per page.

The text is divided according to the κεφαλαια (chapters), whose numbers are given at the margin.

It contains Prolegomena, lectionary markings at the margin (for Church reading), incipits, subscriptions at the end of each book, and numbers of stichoi.

The order of books: Acts, Catholic epistles, and Pauline epistles. It contains also Martyrium Pauli.

== Text ==
The Greek text of the codex is a representative of the Byzantine text-type. Aland placed it in Category V.

== History ==
There is inscription on the first leaf: "liber hospitalis de Cusa trevirensis dioc. R".

The manuscript was examined by Griesbach (in Acts 11-13, 1 Peter, Romans, Ephesians, 1 Corinthians 1-7) and Bloomfield. C. R. Gregory saw it in 1883.

The manuscript was added to the list of the New Testament manuscripts by Scholz (1794-1852).

Formerly it was labeled by 59^{a} and 62^{p}. In 1908 Gregory gave the number 384 to it.

The manuscript is currently housed at the British Library (Harley MS 5588).

== See also ==
- List of New Testament minuscules
- Biblical manuscript
- Textual criticism
