= Minuscule 352 =

- New Testament manuscript
- Text: Gospels †
- Date: 11th century
- Script: Greek
- Found: 1607
- Now at: Biblioteca Ambrosiana
- Cite: J. M. A. Scholz, Biblisch-kritische Reise (Leipzig, 1823)
- Size: 24.5 cm by 19.5 cm
- Type: Byzantine text-type
- Category: V
- Note: marginalia

Minuscule 352 (in the Gregory-Aland numbering), ε 123 (Soden), is a Greek minuscule manuscript of the New Testament, on parchment. Paleographically it has been assigned to the 11th century. It has marginalia.

== Description ==
The codex contains the text of the four Gospels on 219 parchment leaves (24.5 cm by 19.5 cm), with only some lacunae (Matthew 1:1-17; Mark 1:1-15; 16:13-20; Luke 1:1-7; 24:43-53; John 1:1-9; 21:3-25). The text is written in one column per page, in 20 lines per page.

The text is divided according to the κεφαλαια (chapters), whose numbers are given at the margin, and their τιτλοι (titles of chapters) at the top of the pages. There is also a division according to the smaller Ammonian Sections, but it was added by a later hand. It contains lectionary markings at the margin.

== Text ==
The Greek text of the codex is a representative of the Byzantine text-type. Hermann von Soden classified it to the textual family K^{x}. Aland placed it in Category V. According to the Claremont Profile Method it represents textual family K^{x} in Luke 1, Luke 10, and Luke 20, and creates cluster 352.

It is close to minuscule 375.

== History ==
Hug and Gregory dated the manuscript to the 11th century. Currently it is dated by the INTF to the 11th century.

The manuscript was brought from Calabria in 1607. It was examined and described by Johann Leonhard Hug and Scholz. It was added to the list of New Testament manuscripts by Scholz (1794-1852). C. R. Gregory saw the manuscript in 1886.

The manuscript is currently housed at the Biblioteca Ambrosiana (B. 93 sup.) in Milan.

== See also ==
- List of New Testament minuscules
- Biblical manuscript
- Textual criticism
