= Minuscule 321 =

- New Testament manuscript
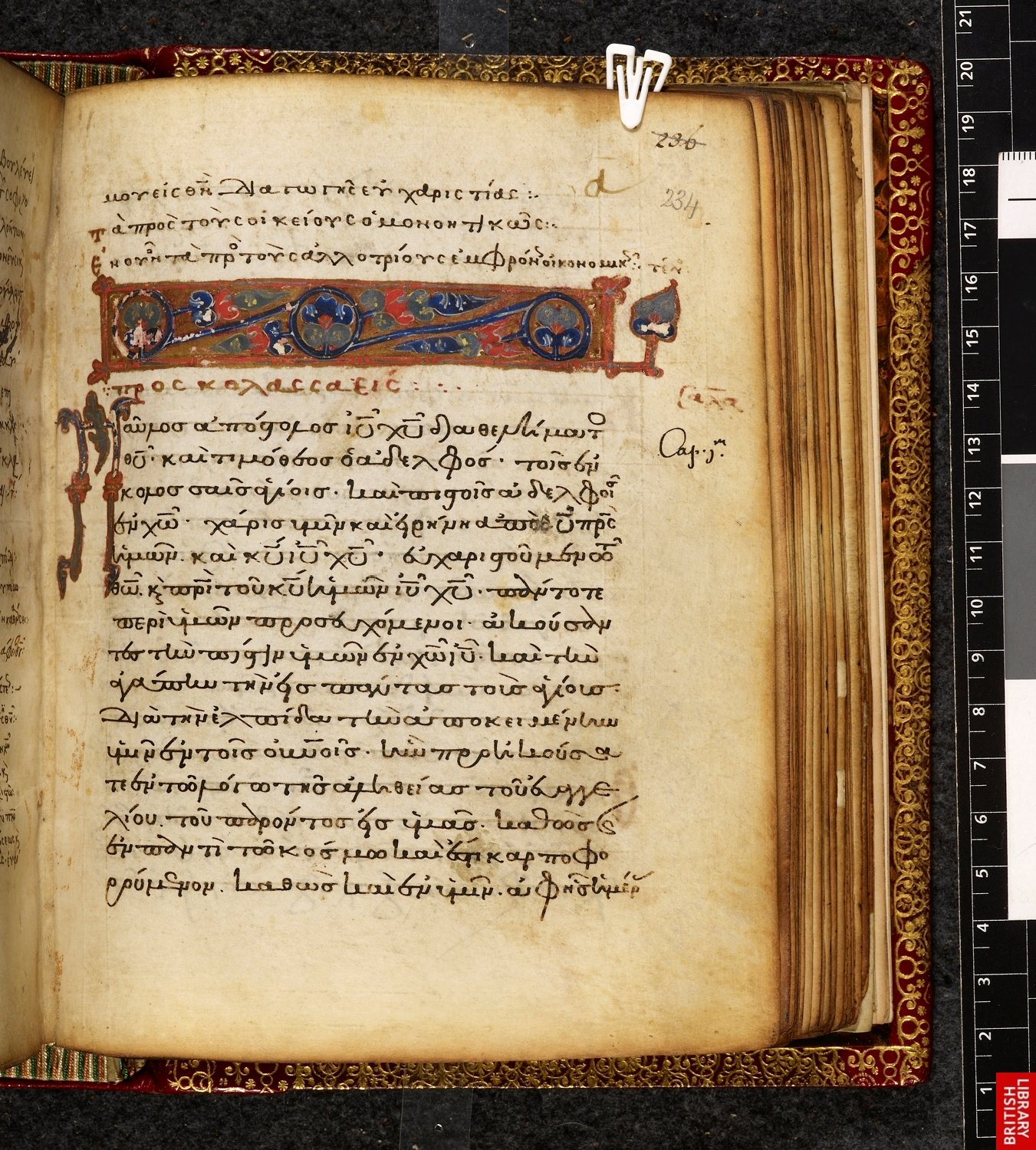
- First page of the Epistle to Colossians; decorated initial Π
- Name: Harley MS 5557
- Text: Acts, Paul †
- Date: 12th century
- Script: Greek
- Found: John Covell, 1675
- Now at: British Library
- Size: 18 cm by 15 cm
- Category: none
- Note: marginalia

Minuscule 321 (in the Gregory-Aland numbering), α 254 (Soden), is a Greek minuscule manuscript of the New Testament, on parchment. Palaeographically it has been assigned to the 12th century. Formerly it was designated by 26^{a} and 32^{p}. It has marginalia.

== Description ==
The codex contains the text of the Acts of the Apostles, Catholic epistles, and Pauline epistles on 293 parchment leaves (18 cm by 15 cm) with lacunae (Acts 1:1-11; Hebrews 11:34-12:6). The text is written in one column and 22 lines per page. The illuminations are in colours and gold.

It contains Prolegomena, tables of the κεφαλαια (tables of contents) before each sacred book, lectionary markings at the margin for liturgical reading, Synaxarion (later hand), and subscriptions at the end of each book, with numbers of stichoi.

On the folio 294 it contains fragments from a 14th-century manuscripts of the Psalms (64(65):3-14 and 67(68):2-13).

Kurt Aland did not place the Greek text of the codex in any Category.

== History ==
The manuscript was written in the 2nd half of the 12th century.

The manuscript was in Constantinople in 1675. John Covel (1637-1722), British chaplain in Constantinople, purchased it in Adrianopol (together with codex 322). It later belonged to Robert Harley.

Formerly it was designated by 26^{a} and 32^{p}. In 1908 Gregory gave the number 321 to it.

It was examined by Mill (Cov. 3) and Bloomfeld. C. R. Gregory saw it in 1883.

The manuscript is currently housed at the British Library (Harley MS 5557).

== See also ==
- List of New Testament minuscules
- Biblical manuscript
- Textual criticism
