= Giovanni Lami =

Italian jurist, church historian, and antiquarian

Picture of Giovanni Lami (18th century)

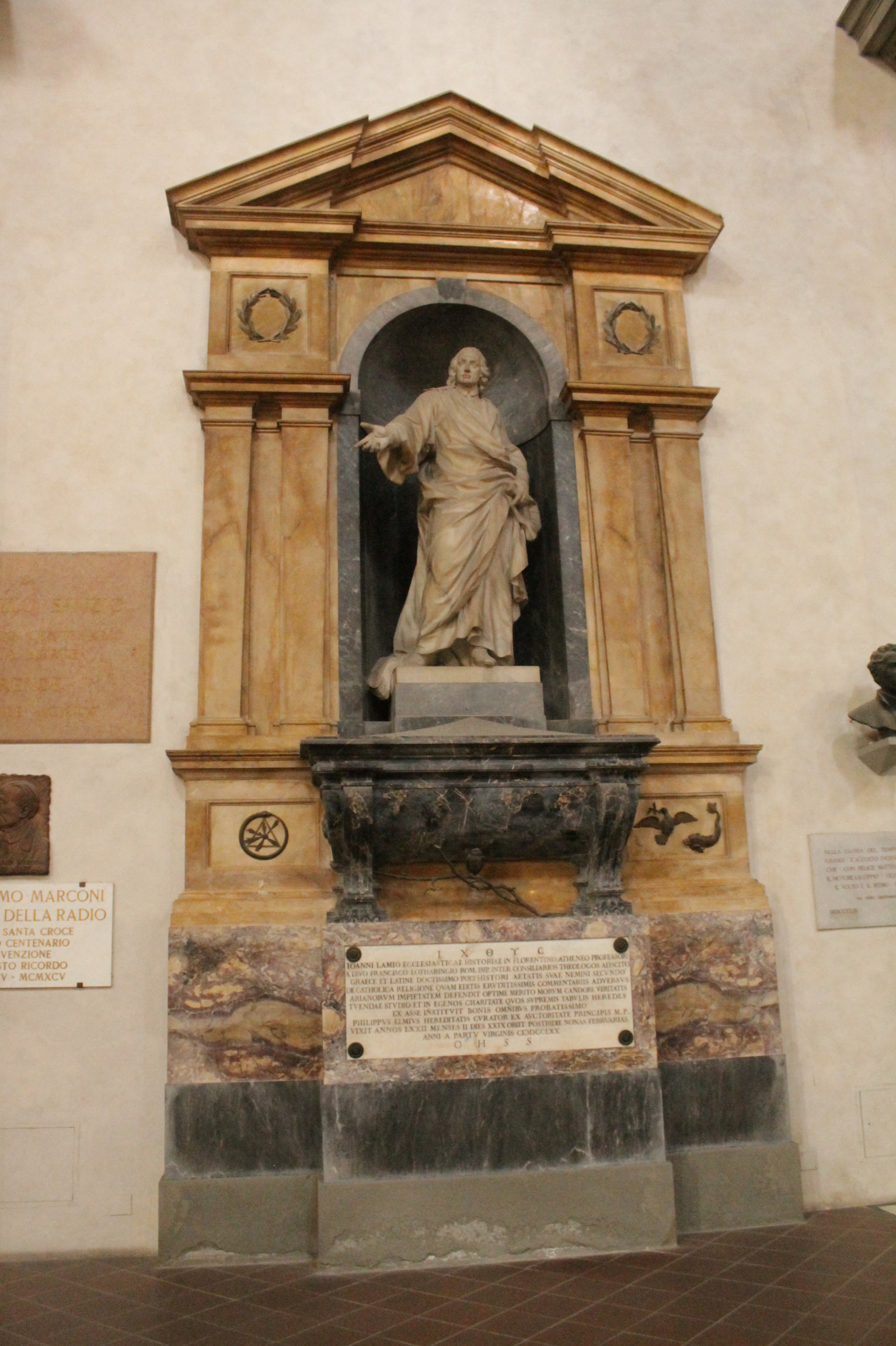
The tomb of Giovanni Lami, Church of Santa Croce, Florence

Giovanni Lami (Latin: Ioannes Lamius; 8 November 1697 – 6 February 1770) was an Italian jurist, church historian, and antiquarian.

== Early years and education ==
He was born at Santa Croce sull'Arno (between Pisa and Florence) into a relatively affluent family; his paternal family were merchants of meat products and owned land in Tuscany. Giovanni's father had graduated from the University of Pisa with a degree in medicine in 1683. Giovanni was orphaned of his father at the age of 2 years, and his mother entrusted him to be educated under his uncle, canon in the Collegiate church in his birthplace. In 1710, he studied for a year in the Jesuit college of Prato (Collegio Cicognini). He was then tutored by another uncle, Carlo Felice.

Giovanni enrolled in 1715 to study law at the University of Pisa and obtained his doctorate in 1719. Among his professors and influences there was the Camaldolese monk and mathematician Luigi Guido Grandi. Upon graduation, he spent a year in the circle of Anton Maria Salvini, an erudite scholar of Classic Greek literature and philosophy.

== Career ==
After a few low-level administrative positions, in 1728, Lami was named librarian of the Biblioteca Pallavicini at Genoa. In this position, he was able to travel to Vienna and meet Apostolo Zeno, Nicolo Pio de Garelli, and Pietro Giannone. Circa 1730, he traveled to Paris, where he was able to experience the new ideas being argued by the Jansenist movement. He also had the opportunity to travel through Netherlands and Flanders. During these travels he published an apologetic defense of the Nicean dogma of the Trinity, in his manuscript De recta Christianorum in eo quod mysterium divinae Trinitatis adtinet sententia, published in Florence in 1733.

In 1732, Lami returned to become librarian at the private Biblioteca Riccardiana, belonging to the wealthy Riccardi family in Florence. The next year he was appointed by the Grand Duke Gian Gastone to a position teaching ecclesiastical history at the University of Florence. Under both these grand-dukes, there was tolerance for scholars voicing a more enlightened attitude towards what should be the accepted cult of Roman Catholicism. For example, Lami, like others such as Muratori in Modena, marshalled a historian and antiquarian research to assessing the likely validity of relics or other venerations.

He was a member of various academic societies in Florence. In the early 1750s, along with Ubaldo Montelatici, he helped found the Accademia dei Georgofili. This group paid special attention to natural sciences and was patronized by Francis I, the first Grand-Duke of the Habsburg-Lorraine dynasty. Lami was admitted into the Accademia della Crusca in August of 1737.

In 1736, Lami began his eighteen-volume Deliciae eruditorum, a "hodge-podge of antiquarian lore" published over a span of decades at Florence. Typically published mostly in Latin, but including Greek annotations, the volumes republished varied investigations into local history, as well as classic and early Christian history. Among the topics, for example was a voyage (Hodeporicon) from Florence to his native Santa Croce dell'Arno, describing the chronology of events in the series of towns. All claimed to be a report by two pseudonymous travelers, Charitonis and Hippoliti in a plodding erudite detail.

Lami was the first to describe the Byzantine manuscripts Minuscule 201, Minuscule 362, and Minuscule 370. He also wrote a Memorabilia, dedicated to the illustrious men of his time, and many other works of history and philology.

Lami also started and edited from 1740–1768 an erudite and scholarly journal, Novelle Litterarie, published in Florence and discussing subjects in all fields. The journal had a substantial intra-Florentine subscription census, but never achieved a European appeal such as the competing journal by After 1768, Giuseppe Bencivenni Pelli took his editorial position. Lami was a court theologian and counselor to the Grand Duke of Tuscany.

== Outlook and legacy ==
Lami was known for his contentious wit and subtle anticlerical thought, one anecdote states that showing foreign visitors the Renaissance architectural masterpiece of the Palazzo Medici Riccardi stated: "There behold the cradle of literature" then turning to the college of the Jesuits, "and there behold its tomb." (Note: The Baroque church of San Giovannino degli Scolopi formerly belonged to the Jesuit order stands across the Via de' Gori from Palazzo Medici Riccardi.) Lami was ultimately a defender of Catholicism, but one influenced by Jansenism, whose closest representatives in Italy were the Oratorians of Saint Philip Neri, but critical of the Jesuits and there official subserviance to the papacy.

Despite not taking ecclesiastical orders, he never married. He died alone at home in Florence on 6 February 1770 and is buried in the church of Santa Croce, Florence. His huge monument, erected in 1772, lies on the south wall close to Galileo and opposite Michelangelo.

== Works ==
- Deliciae eruditorum seu veterum anectdotum opuscolorum collectanea Io. Lamis collegit illustravit editit, Florence, 1736. Contains Michaelis Glycae Epistolarum pars prima (Papal historical tidbits)
- Deliciae eruditorum Io. Lamis collegit illustravit editit, Florence, 1737. Contains Historiae Pontificiae et Augustae; Chronicum Pontificum (Papal historical tidbits)
- Deliciae eruditorum, Volume 4 Io. Lamis collegit illustravit editit, Florence, 1740. Contains Historiae Pontificiae, Pars Secunda; and Chronicon imperatoum Leonis Urbevetani completectens
- Deliciae eruditorum, Volume 9 Io. Lamis collegit illustravit editit, Florence, 1740. Contains Maximi margunii/ Dionysii catteliani/ Antonii eparchi/ Arsenii monembasiensis epistolae.
- Deliciae eruditorum, Volume 4 Io. Lamis collegit illustravit editit, Florence, 1740. Contains Nicetae Heracleensis in epistolam I and Corinthios/ Enarrationum Pars I.
- Deliciae eruditorum, Volume 4 Io. Lamis collegit illustravit editit, Florence, 1740. Contains Historiae Siculae Laur. Bonincontrii, Pars Prima
- Deliciae eruditorum, Volume 4 Io. Lamis collegit illustravit editit, Florence, 1740. Contains Charitonis et Hippophili Hodoerporici Pars Primi
- De eruditione Apostolorum, Florence, 1738.
- Lezioni di antichità toscane, Florence, 1766.
