= Minuscule 329 =

12th century Greek minuscule manuscript of the New Testament

- New Testament manuscript
- Text: Gospels
- Date: 12th century
- Script: Greek
- Now at: Bibliothèque nationale de France
- Size: 32.7 cm by 24 cm
- Type: Byzantine text-type
- Category: V

Minuscule 329 (in the Gregory-Aland numbering), A^{219} (Soden), is a Greek minuscule manuscript of the New Testament, on parchment. Palaeographically it has been assigned to the 12th century.

== Description ==
The codex contains the text of the four Gospels on 321 parchment leaves (32.7 cm by 24 cm) with some lacunae. The text is written in one column per page, biblical text in 25 lines per page, text of commentary in 50 lines per page.

It contains the table of the κεφαλαια (table of contents) before Gospel of John, subscriptions at the end of Luke, numbers of στιχοι to Luke and John, and a commentary (in Mark of Victor's). Matthew 25:36-28:20 was added by a later hand, without a commentary. Mark 14:11-20 has not a commentary.

== Text ==
The Greek text of the codex is a representative of the Byzantine text-type. Aland placed it in Category V. It was not examined by the Claremont Profile Method.

== History ==
The manuscript was described by Bernard de Montfaucon. It was added to the list of New Testament manuscripts by Scholz (1794-1852). It was examined and described by Paulin Martin. C. R. Gregory saw it in 1885.

The manuscript is currently housed at the Bibliothèque nationale de France (Coislin, Gr. 19) at Paris.

== See also ==
- List of New Testament minuscules
- Biblical manuscript
- Textual criticism
