= Erminia Caudana =

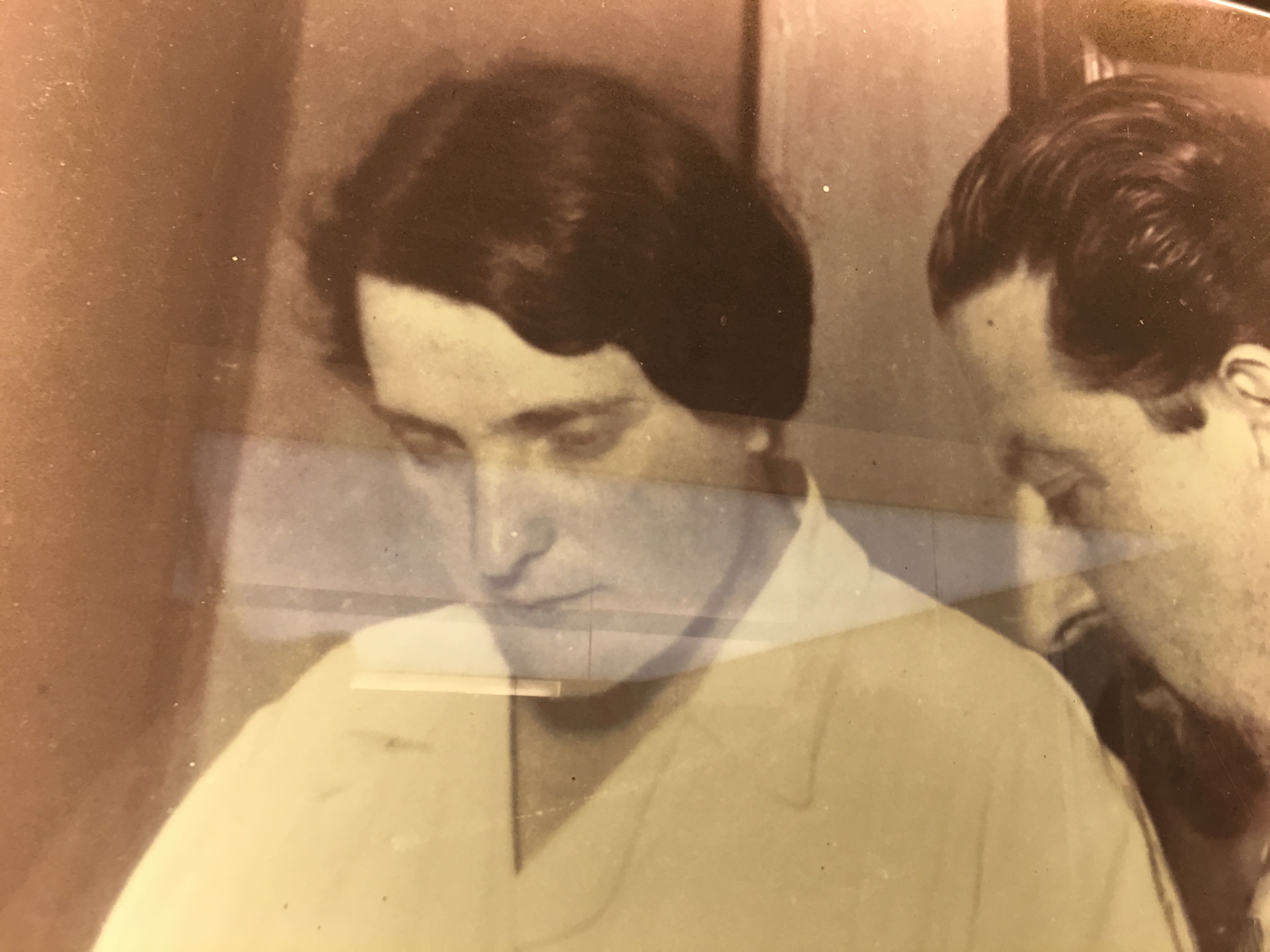
- Born: 6 April 1896; Turin
- Died: 5 January 1974 (aged 77); Turin
- Known for: Restoration of ancient papyri

Erminia Caudana (6 April 1896 – 5 January 1974) was an Italian restorer. She was known for her restoration of ancient papyri.

== Life ==
Caudana was born in Turin in 1896. At the age of fourteen she went to work at the Turin National University Library which was directed by Carlo Marrè. Marrè was a former restorer of the Vatican library who had first arrived in Turin after a fire in January 1904 to help recover rare artefacts damaged by the fire. Caudana would take over from Marrè in 1921.

In 1929 she went to Egypt to assist in the restoration of the Kings Papyrus working under Giulio Farina. This document described the history of the pharaohs to Rameses II and had been found in 1822.

She worked with many leading egyptologists and in 1937 she was asked to work on papyri from 2543 to 2435 B.C.E. The 12 rolls were taken to Turin where with care they could be unrolled. Caudana had spoken of a special liquid she had that could be used to soak papyri for 24 hours. After this they could be unrolled and reshaped between panes of grass. Once restored these artefacts could then be returned to Egypt.

Caudana worked on many notable documents and textiles and died in Turin in 1974. She had worked with her nephew, Amerigo Bruno, during her final years.
