= Minuscule 356 =

- New Testament manuscript
- Text: Catholic epistles †, Pauline epistles
- Date: 12th century
- Script: Greek
- Now at: Emmanuel College, Cambridge
- Size: 9.2 cm by 7.8 cm
- Type: Byzantine text-type
- Category: V
- Hand: beautifully written
- Note: marginalia

Minuscule 356 (in the Gregory-Aland numbering), α 255 (Soden), is a Greek minuscule manuscript of the New Testament, on parchment. Paleographically it has been assigned to the 12th century. Formerly it was labelled by 53^{a} and 30^{p}, and cited by Tischendorf as n^{scr}. It has marginalia.

== Description ==
The codex contains the text of the 2 Peter 2:4-3:18; 1 John 1:1-3:20 and Pauline epistles on 145 parchment leaves (size 9.2 cm by 7.8 cm) with some lacunae (1 Corinthians 11:7-15:56; Hebrews 11:27-13:25). The text is written in one column per page, in 24 lines per page, in very small and beautiful minuscule letters. According to Scrivener it has 184 errors of itacism.

The text is divided according to the κεφαλαια (chapters), whose numbers are given at the margin, and their τιτλοι (titles of chapters) at the top of the pages.

It contains Oecumenius' Prologue to the Romans, tables of the κεφαλαια (tables of contents) before each sacred book, and some marginal notes made by primâ manu. The text after 1 Timothy 6:5 was written by other hand, and far less careful. The manuscript exhibits throughout many abbreviations.

== Text ==
The Greek text of the codex is a representative of the Byzantine text-type. Aland placed it in Category V.

== History ==
The manuscript was given to the College in Testimonium grati animi by Samuel G. Wright, a member of the College, in 1598. It was examined by John Mill (Cant. 3), Wettstein (53^{a}, 30^{p}), Fenton Hort, Dean Burgon, and Scrivener. C. R. Gregory saw it in 1883.

The manuscript was added to the list of the New Testament manuscripts by Scholz (1794-1852).

Formerly it was labelled by 53^{a} and 30^{p}. In 1908 Gregory gave the number 356 to it.

The manuscript is currently housed at the Emmanuel College (I. 4. 35, MS 110) in Cambridge.

== See also ==
- List of New Testament minuscules
- Biblical manuscript
- Textual criticism
