= Minuscule 319 =

- New Testament manuscript
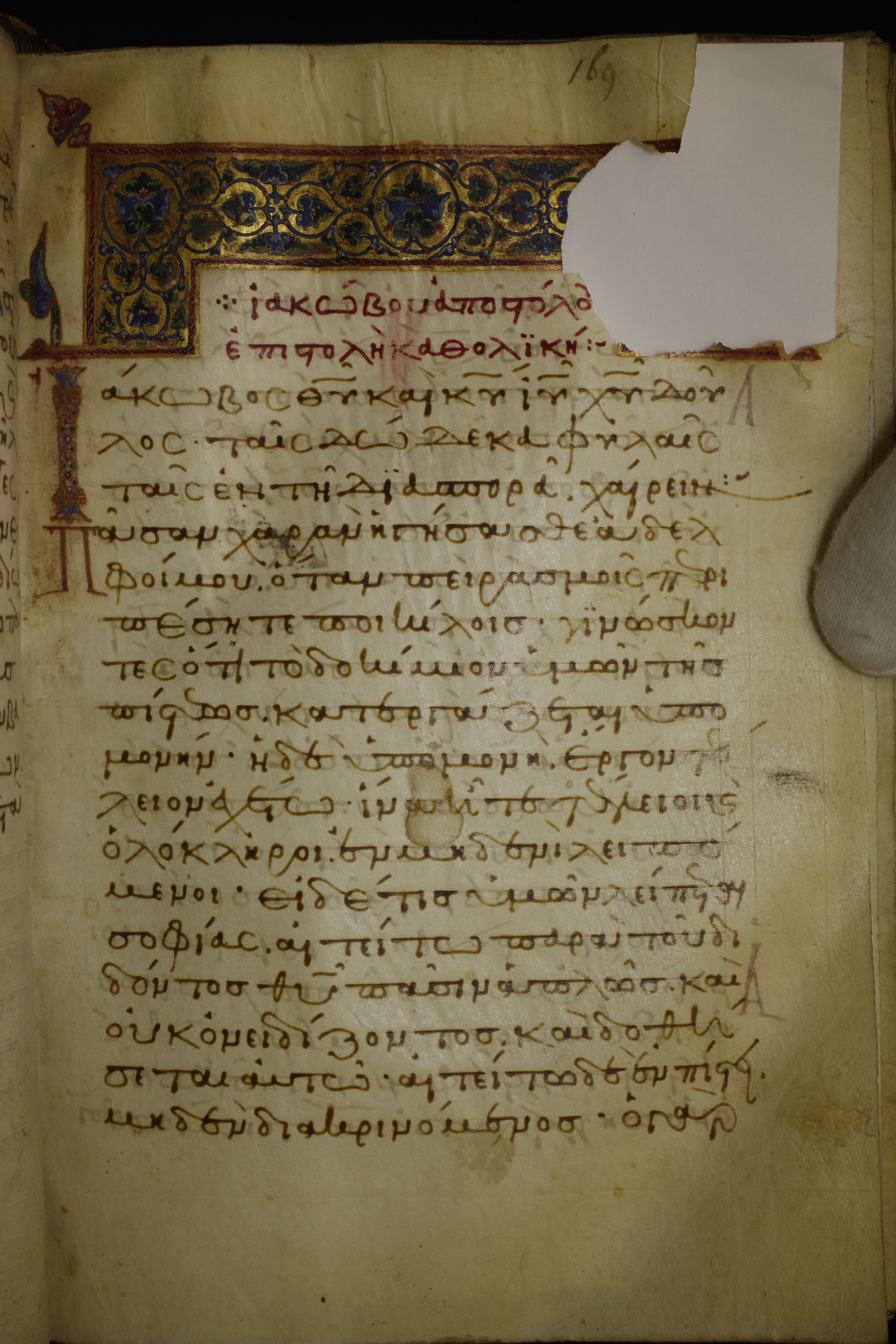
- The first page of James (folio 85 recto)
- Text: Acts, Paul †
- Date: 12th century
- Script: Greek
- Now at: Christ's College, Cambridge
- Size: 22.5 cm by 15 cm
- Type: Byzantine text-type
- Category: V

Minuscule 319 (in the Gregory-Aland numbering), α 256 (Soden), is a Greek minuscule manuscript of the New Testament, on parchment. Palaeographically it has been assigned to the 12th century. Formerly it was labelled by 24^{a} and 29^{p}.

== Description ==
The codex contains the text of the Acts of the Apostles, Catholic epistles, and Pauline epistles on 303 parchment leaves (22.5 cm by 15 cm) with lacunae (Acts 1:1-11; 18:20-20:14; James 5:14—1 Peter 1:4). Some other lacunae were supplied by modern hand. Some leaves of this manuscript are torn and decayed. There are also many changes by a later hand.

The text is written in one column per page, biblical text in 22 lines per page.

== Text ==
The Greek text of the codex is a representative of the Byzantine text-type. Aland placed it in Category V.

== History ==
Thomas Gale collated the manuscript for Mill (Cant. 2). It was examined Bentley, and John Wigley. C. R. Gregory saw it in 1883. Formerly it was labelled by 24^{a} and 29^{p}. In 1908 Gregory gave the number 319 to it.

The manuscript is currently housed at the Christ's College, Cambridge (GG. 1.9 (Ms. 9)) at Cambridge.

== See also ==
- List of New Testament minuscules
- Biblical manuscript
- Textual criticism
