= Minuscule 312 =

- New Testament manuscript
- Text: Acts, Paul †
- Date: 11th century
- Script: Greek
- Now at: British Library
- Size: 19.3 cm by 14.7 cm
- Category: none
- Note: marginalia

Minuscule 312 (in the Gregory-Aland numbering), α 187 (Soden), is a Greek minuscule manuscript of the New Testament, on parchment. Palaeographically it has been assigned to the 11th century. Formerly it was labelled by 22^{a} and 75^{p}. It has marginalia.

== Description ==
The codex contains the text of the Acts of the Apostles, Catholic epistles, and Pauline epistles on 145 + 172 parchment leaves (19.3 cm by 14.7 cm) with lacunae (Acts 1:1-11; 3:16-4:2; Hebrews 6:7-7:1). It is written in one column per page, in 22 lines per page.

The text is divided according to the κεφαλαια (chapters), whose numbers are given at the margin.

It contains lists of the κεφαλαια (tables of contents) before each book, prolegomena, Synaxarion. Lectionary markings at the margin were added by a later hand.

Kurt Aland did not place the text of this codex in any Category.

== History ==
Formerly the manuscript belonged to the monastery Constantos, then to Richard Mead. Wettstein saw it in 1746 in London. It was examined by Askew, Griesbach, Bloomfeld, and Gregory. Griesbach collated its text in Pauline epistles. C. R. Gregory saw it in 1883. Formerly it was labelled by 22^{a} and 75^{p}. In 1908 Gregory gave number 312 for it.

The manuscript is currently housed at the British Library (Add MS 5115–5116) in London.

== See also ==
- List of New Testament minuscules
- Biblical manuscript
- Textual criticism
