= Minuscule 375 =

- New Testament manuscript
- Text: Gospels
- Date: 11th century
- Script: Greek
- Now at: Vatican Library
- Size: 17.1 cm by 14 cm
- Type: Byzantine text-type
- Category: V
- Note: marginalia

Minuscule 375 (in the Gregory-Aland numbering), ε 112 (Soden), is a Greek minuscule manuscript of the New Testament, on parchment. Palaeographically it has been assigned to the 11th century. It contains marginalia.

== Description ==
The codex contains the text of the four Gospels on 173 parchment leaves (17.1 cm by 14 cm). It is written in two columns per page, in 26 lines per page.

The text is divided according to the κεφαλαια (chapters), whose numbers are given at the margin, with their τιτλοι (titles of chapters) at the top of the pages. There is also a division according to the smaller Ammonian Sections (in Mark 233 Sections, the last in 16:8), with references to the Eusebian Canons (written below Ammonian Section numbers).

It contains the Eusebian Canon tables, tables of the κεφαλαια (tables of contents) before each Gospel, and pictures.

== Text ==
The Greek text of the codex is a representative of the Byzantine text-type. Hermann von Soden classified it to the textual family K^{x}. Aland placed it in Category V.

According to the Claremont Profile Method it represents textual family K^{x} in Luke 1, Luke 10, and Luke 20. It belongs also to the cluster 352.

== History ==
The manuscript once belonged to John Metelli. The manuscript was added to the list of New Testament manuscripts by Scholz (1794–1852). C. R. Gregory saw it in 1886.

The manuscript is currently housed at the Vatican Library (Vat. gr. 1533) in Rome.

== See also ==
- List of New Testament minuscules
- Biblical manuscript
- Textual criticism
