= Minuscule 309 =

- New Testament manuscript
- Text: Acts, Paul †
- Date: 13th century
- Script: Greek
- Now at: Cambridge University Library
- Size: 16.4 cm by 13.4 cm
- Type: Byzantine text-type
- Category: V
- Note: marginalia

Minuscule 309 (in the Gregory-Aland numbering), α 351 (Soden), is a Greek minuscule manuscript of the New Testament, on paper. Palaeographically it has been assigned to the 14th century. Formerly it was labelled by 21^{a} and 26^{p}. It has marginalia.

== Description ==
The codex contains the text of the Acts of the Apostles, Catholic epistles, and Pauline epistles on 159 paper leaves (16.4 cm by 13.4 cm) with numerous lacunae (Acts 1:1-12:2; 14:22-15:10; Romans 11:22-33; 15:14-16.24-26; 16:4-20; 1 Corinthians 1:15-3:12; 2 Timothy 1:1-2:4; Titus 1:9-2:15; Philemon 3-25; all Hebrews). The text is written in one column per page, in 22-25 lines per page.

It contains Prolegomena to the Pauline epistles only, lectionary markings at the margin (for liturgical reading), and subscriptions with numbers of stichoi at the end of each book.

== Text ==
The Greek text of the codex is a representative of the Byzantine text-type. Aland placed it in Category V.

== History ==
In the 14th century the manuscript belonged to Kosmas, a monk. It was brought to England from the East by John Luke, professor of Arabic in Cambridge. It was examined by Wettstein. John Berriman, one of the former owners of the manuscript, presented it in 1761 to the British Museum.

C. R. Gregory saw it in 1886. Formerly it was labelled by 21^{a} and 26^{p}. In 1908 Gregory gave the number 309 to it.

The manuscript is currently housed at the Cambridge University Library (Dd. 11.90) at Cambridge.

== See also ==
- List of New Testament minuscules
- Biblical manuscript
- Textual criticism
