= Minuscule 371 =

- New Testament manuscript
- Text: Gospels
- Date: 10th century
- Script: Greek
- Now at: Vatican Library
- Size: 20.5 cm by 16.8 cm
- Type: Byzantine text-type
- Category: V
- Note: marginalia

Minuscule 371 (in the Gregory-Aland numbering), ε 1003 (Soden), is a Greek minuscule manuscript of the New Testament, on parchment. Palaeographically it has been assigned to the 10th century. It contains marginalia.

== Description ==
The codex contains the text of the four Gospels on 315 parchment leaves (20.5 cm by 16.8 cm). It is written in one column per page, in 20–21 lines per page.

The text is divided according to the κεφαλαια (chapters), whose numbers are given at the margin, and their τιτλοι (titles of chapters) at the top of the pages. There is also a division according to the Ammonian Sections (in Mark 233 Sections, the last section in 16:8), whose numbers are given at the margin, with references to the Eusebian Canons.

It contains the Eusebian Canon tables, tables of the κεφαλαια (tables of contents) before each Gospel, and pictures.

== Text ==
The Greek text of the codex is a representative of the Byzantine text-type. Hermann von Soden classified it to the textual family K^{x}. Aland placed it in Category V. According to the Claremont Profile Method it belongs to the textual group 291 in Luke 1 (weak), Luke 10, and Luke 20.

== History ==
The manuscript was added to the list of New Testament manuscripts by Scholz (1794–1852). It was examined by Burgon. C. R. Gregory saw the manuscript in 1886.

The manuscript is currently housed at the Vatican Library (Vat. gr. 1159) in Rome.

== See also ==
- List of New Testament minuscules
- Biblical manuscript
- Textual criticism
