= Minuscule 110 =

- New Testament manuscript
- Text: Acts, Paul, Rev.
- Date: 12th category
- Script: Greek
- Found: Sinai
- Now at: British Library
- Size: 22.3 cm by 16.5 cm
- Type: Byzantine text-type
- Category: V
- Note: marginalia

Minuscule 110 (in the Gregory-Aland numbering of New Testament manuscripts), α 204 (in the von Soden numbering of New Testament manuscripts), is a Greek minuscule manuscript of the New Testament on parchment. Using the study of comparative writing styles (palaeography), it has been assigned to the 12th century. It has complex contents with full marginal notations.

It was formerly labelled as 28^{a}, 34^{p}, or 8^{r}.

== Description ==
The manuscript is a codex (precursor to the modern book) containing the near complete text of Acts, the Catholic epistles, the Pauline epistles, and the Book of Revelation on 292 parchment leaves (sized 22.3 cm by 16.5 cm). It has some gaps, namely Acts 1:1-20, and Revelation 6:14-8:1, and 22:19-21 (the last verses of Revelation).

The text is written in one column per page, with 23 lines per page.

The text is divided according to the chapters (known as κεφαλαια / kephalaia), whose numbers are given in the margin, with their titles (known as τιτλοι / titloi) written at the top of the pages.

It contains an introduction to the Pauline Epistles, lectionary markings in the margin (for liturgical use), subscriptions at the end of each book, and the numbers of lines (known as στιχοι / stichoi). It has a commentary of Theophylact. The codex has survived in poor condition, and its text is often illegible.

== Text ==
The text of the codex is considered to be a representative of the Byzantine text-type. The text-types are groups of different New Testament manuscripts which share specific or generally related readings, which then differ from each other group, and thus the conflicting readings can separate out the groups. These are then used to determine the original text as published; there are three main groups with names: Alexandrian, Western, and Byzantine. Biblical scholar Kurt Aland placed it in Category V of his New Testament manuscript classification system. Category V manuscripts are those "with a purely or predominantly Byzantine text."

== History ==
The manuscript was brought by clergyman and scientist John Covel from Mount Sinai (Egypt) to England (along with minuscule 65). Covel marked it as codex 5, but afterwards gave it the name of the Sinai manuscript.

Former 110

In his numeration, textual critic Johann Jakob Wettstein gave the siglum 110 to Codex Ravianus (also called Berolinensis), a transcription from the Complutensian Polyglot (the earliest printed multi-languaged Bible) so slavish that it copies even typographical errors from that exemplar. It also includes some variant readings inserted from Stephanus's 1550 edition (an early critical edition of the New Testament). It once belonged to Christian Rave, a professor in Uppsala (hence the name Codex Ravianus).

In 1908, Gregory removed Codex Ravianus from the list of Greek New Testament manuscripts. Codex Ravianus is now no longer listed, as it is only a facsimile of the Complutensis Polyglot. It is housed in the Berlin State Library.

Current History

Minuscule 110 was examined by textual critic John Mill, and the text of Acts and Paul (but not the Catholic Epistles) was examined by textual critic Samuel Thomas Bloomfield. Biblical scholar Frederick H. A. Scrivener collated the text of Revelation. Biblical scholar Caspar René Gregory saw the manuscript in 1883.

It was formerly labelled as 28^{a}, 34^{p}, or 8^{r}. Gregory assigned it the number 110 in his Liste, which is still used today.

The manuscript is dated by the Institute for New Testament Textual Research (INTF) to the 12th century.

It is currently housed at the British Library, (shelf number Harley MS 5778) in London, England.

== See also ==
- List of New Testament minuscules
- Biblical manuscript
- Textual criticism
