= Minuscule 369 =

- New Testament manuscript
- Text: Gospel of Mark; Greek Grammar
- Date: 14th century
- Script: Greek
- Now at: Riccardian Library
- Size: 13.5 cm by 10.5 cm
- Type: Byzantine
- Category: V
- Note: marginalia

Minuscule 369 (in the Gregory-Aland numbering), ε 429 (Soden), is a Greek minuscule manuscript of the New Testament, on parchment. Paleographically it has been assigned to the 14th century. It has marginalia.

== Description ==
The codex contains the text of the Gospel of Mark 6:25-9:45; 10:17-16:9 on 23 parchment leaves (13.59 cm by 10.5 cm). The text is written in one column per page, in 25 lines per page.

It contains numbers of the κεφαλαια (chapters) at the margin, the τιτλοι (titles of chapters) at the top, the Ammonian Sections, references to the Eusebian Canons, and lectionary markings at the margin. The manuscript contains also a Greek Grammar and Phaedrus fables. The text is much rubricated.

It contains also a part of a Greek Grammar and "Avieni Fabulae".

== Text ==
The Greek text of the codex is a representative of the Byzantine text-type. Aland placed it in Category V.

== History ==
The manuscript was added to the list of New Testament manuscripts by Scholz (1794-1852). It was examined by Burgon. C. R. Gregory saw it in 1886.

The manuscript is currently housed at the Biblioteca Riccardiana (90) in Florence.

== See also ==
- List of New Testament minuscules
- Biblical manuscript
- Textual criticism
