= Minuscule 311 =

Greek minuscule manuscript of the New Testament

- New Testament manuscript
- Text: Gospel of Matthews †
- Date: 12th century
- Script: Greek
- Now at: Bibliothèque nationale de France
- Size: 35.5 cm by 29 cm
- Category: none

Minuscule 311 (in the Gregory-Aland numbering), is a Greek minuscule manuscript of the New Testament, on parchment. Palaeographically it has been assigned to the 12th century.

== Description ==
The codex contains the text of the Gospel of Matthew on 357 parchment leaves (35.5 cm by 29 cm) with lacunae (Matthew 1:1-5:4). The text is written in one column per page, in 28 lines per page. The biblical text is surrounded by a catena of Theophylact.

Kurt Aland did not place the Greek text of the codex in any Category.

== History ==
The manuscript once belonged to Cardinal Mazarin (like codex 14, 305, 313, and 324). It was added to the list of New Testament manuscripts by Scholz (1794–1852). It was examined and described by Paulin Martin. C. R. Gregory saw the manuscript in 1885.

The manuscript is currently housed at the Bibliothèque nationale de France (Gr. 203) at Paris.

== See also ==
- List of New Testament minuscules
- Biblical manuscript
- Textual criticism
