= Minuscule 313 =

- New Testament manuscript
- Text: Gospel of Luke 1:1-12:16
- Date: 14th century
- Script: Greek
- Now at: Bibliothèque nationale de France
- Size: 30 cm by 21 cm
- Type: Byzantine text-type
- Category: V

Minuscule 313 (in the Gregory-Aland numbering), N^{λ46} (Soden), is a Greek minuscule manuscript of the New Testament, on paper. Palaeographically it has been assigned to the 14th century.

== Description ==
The codex contains the text of the Gospel of Luke 1:1-12:16 on 460 paper leaves (30 cm by 21 cm). The text is written in one column per page, in 28-32 lines per page. The biblical text is surrounded by a catena.

== Text ==
The Greek text of the codex is a representative of the Byzantine text-type. Aland placed it in Category V. It was not examined by the Claremont Profile Method.

== History ==
The manuscript once belonged to Cardinal Mazarin (like codex 14, 311, 324). It was added to the list of New Testament manuscripts by Scholz (1794–1852). It was examined and described by Paulin Martin. C. R. Gregory saw the manuscript in 1885.

The manuscript is currently housed at the Bibliothèque nationale de France (Gr. 208) at Paris.

== See also ==
- List of New Testament minuscules
- Biblical manuscript
- Textual criticism
