= Minuscule 201 =

- New Testament manuscript
- Text: New Testament
- Date: 11th century
- Script: Greek
- Now at: British Library
- Cite: G. Lami, De eruditione apostolorum, Florence 1738
- Size: 34.7 cm by 27.1 cm
- Type: Byzantine text-type
- Category: V
- Note: member of K^{r}

Minuscule 201 (in the Gregory-Aland numbering), δ 403 (Soden), is a Greek minuscule manuscript of the New Testament, on parchment. Palaeographically it has been assigned to the 11th century. It has marginalia.

== Description ==
The codex contains entire text of the New Testament on 493 parchment leaves (size 34.7 cm by 27.1 cm). The Pauline epistles are followed after the Catholic epistles. The text is written in two columns per page, in 22 lines per page, in light-brown or dark-brown ink, the initial letters in gold.

The text is divided according to the κεφαλαια (chapters), whose numbers are given at the margin, and their τιτλοι (titles of chapters) at the top of the pages. There is also another division according to the Ammonian Sections, with some references to the Eusebian Canons.

It contains synaxaria, tables of the κεφαλαια (tables of contents) before each book, prolegomena (to James and some Pauline epistles), αναγνωσεις (lessons), subscriptions at the end of each book, numbers of στιχοι, and Euthalian Apparatus to the Catholic and Pauline epistles.

According to colophons, Gospel of Matthew was written in 8 years after Ascension, Mark – 10 years, Luke 15 years, and John 32 years.

== Text ==
The Greek text of the codex is a representative of the Byzantine text-type. Hermann von Soden classified it to the textual family K^{r}. Aland placed it in Category V. Its text is very close to the codex 480.

According to the Claremont Profile Method it represents textual family K^{r} in Luke 1, Luke 10, and Luke 20, as its perfect member.

== History ==
According to the colophon from Epistle to Hebrews the manuscript was written by scribe named Methodius (in 6866):

ετελειωθη μηνι οικτοβφιω ζ ινδικτιωνη ια ετους ςωξς. Μεθοδιε χειρ τω θυτορακενδυτου

Formerly the manuscript belonged to the monastery S. Marco in Florence. Later it belonged to Samuel Butler Bishop of Lichfield.

Giovanni Lami was the first who described the manuscript. It was examined by Wettstein, Birch, Griesbach, Bloomfield, Scrivener, and C. R. Gregory (1883). Griesbach placed it twice on his list of manuscripts of NT, as 107 and 201.

It is currently housed at the British Library (Add MS 11837) in London.

== See also ==
- List of New Testament minuscules
- Biblical manuscript
- Textual criticism
