= Turin National University Library =

Library in Italy

Coordinates: 45°4′6.20″N 7°41′12.92″E

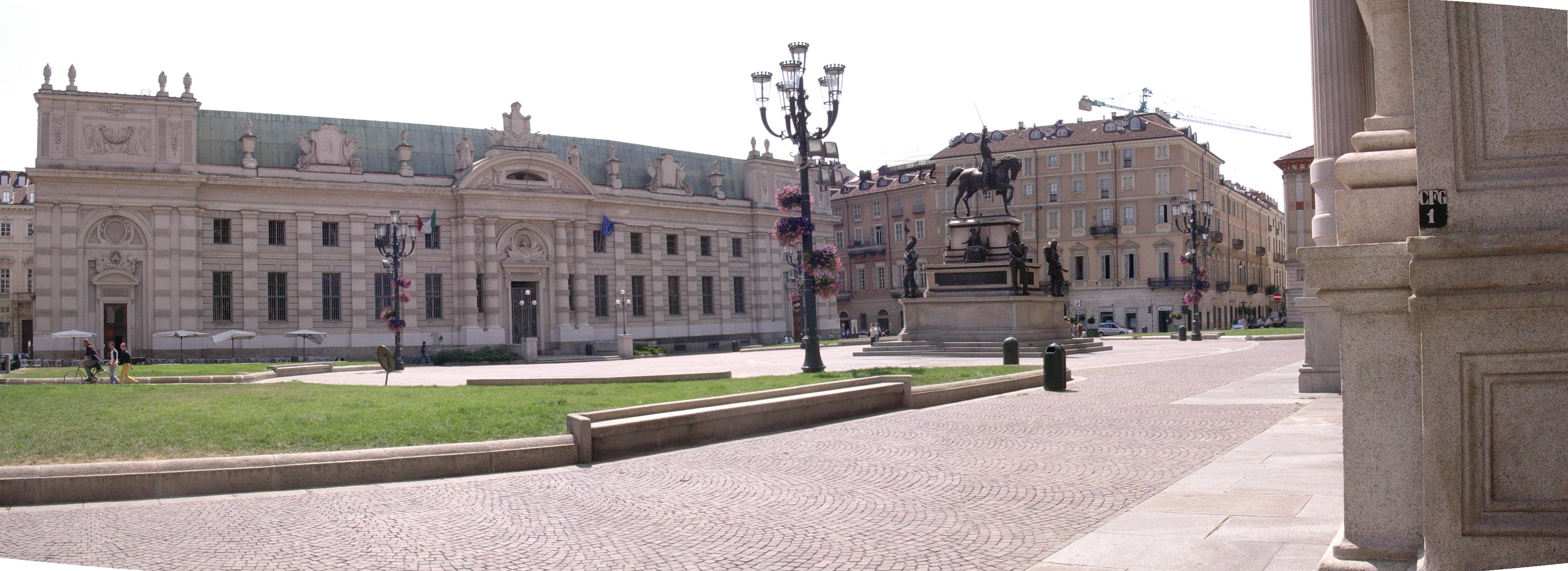
National University Library

The National University Library (Italian: Biblioteca nazionale universitaria), located in Turin, Italy, is one of the country's main libraries.

It was founded in 1720 as the Royal University Library by Victor Amadeus II, who unified collections from the library of the University of Turin and that of the Dukes of Savoy. It was renamed as the National Library in 1872, after Italian unification.

In 1904 a fire destroyed thousands of books and manuscripts from the library. Expertise gained from recovering from the fire was used to train restorers such as Erminia Caudana.

It was also bombed in December 1942.

At present time, the library owns over 763,833 books, 1,095 periodicals, and 1,600 incunabula.
