= Minuscule 306 =

- New Testament manuscript
- Text: Matthew, John †
- Date: 12th century
- Script: Greek
- Now at: Bibliothèque nationale de France
- Size: 28.2 cm by 20.5 cm
- Type: Byzantine text-type
- Category: V

Minuscule 306 (in the Gregory-Aland numbering), Θ^{ε21} (Soden), is a Greek minuscule manuscript of the New Testament, on parchment. Palaeographically it has been assigned to the 12th century.

== Description ==
The codex contains the text of the Gospel of Matthew and Gospel of John on 559 parchment leaves (28.2 cm by 20.5 cm) with lacunae (John 21:1-8.24.25). The text is written in one column per page, in 25 lines per page. The biblical text is surrounded by a catena. Matthew and John have a Theophylact's commentary.

== Text ==
The Greek text of the codex is a representative of the Byzantine text-type. Aland placed it in Category V.

== History ==
The manuscript once belonged to Jean Hurault de Boistaillé (as codex 10, 203, 263, 301, 314). It was added to the list of New Testament manuscripts by Scholz (1794–1852).

The manuscript was examined by Wettstein, Scholz (1794–1852), and Paulin Martin. C. R. Gregory saw the manuscript in 1885.

The manuscript is currently housed at the Bibliothèque nationale de France (Gr. 197) at Paris.

== See also ==
- List of New Testament minuscules
- Biblical manuscript
- Textual criticism
