= Minuscule 263 =

- New Testament manuscript
- Text: New Testament (except Rev.)
- Date: 13th century
- Script: Greek
- Now at: National Library of France
- Size: 21.1 cm by 15.7 cm
- Type: eclectic
- Category: III/V
- Note: marginalia

Minuscule 263 (in the Gregory-Aland numbering), δ 372 (Soden), is a Greek minuscule manuscript of the New Testament, on parchment. Paleographically it has been assigned to the 13th century. It has marginalia.

== Description ==
The codex contains the text of the New Testament except Book of Revelation on 294 parchment leaves (21.1 cm by 15.7 cm). The text is written in one column per page, in 28-29 lines. The order of books: Gospels, Acts of the Apostles, Catholic epistles, and Pauline epistles (Hebrews after 2 Thessalonians).

The text is divided according to the κεφαλαια (chapters), whose numbers are given at the margin, and their τιτλοι (titles of chapters) at the top of the pages. The text of the Gospels is also a divided according to the Ammonian Sections (in Mark 234 Sections, the last section in 16:9). It has no references to the Eusebian Canons.

It contains tables of the κεφαλαια (tables of contents) before each Gospel, lectionary markings at the margin (for liturgical use), and subscriptions at the end of each of biblical book, with numbers of στιχοι.

== Text ==
The Greek text of the codex is a representative of the Byzantine text-type (except Paul). Kurt Aland placed it in Category III in Pauline epistles and in Category V in rest of books. The Greek text of the codex is a representative of the Byzantine text-type. Aland placed it in Category V.

Hermann von Soden classified it to the textual family K^{1}.

According to the Claremont Profile Method it represents textual family K^{x} in Luke 1 and Luke 20. In Luke 10 no profile was made.

Ending of the Epistle to the Romans has omitted verse 16:24 (as in codices Codex Sinaiticus A B C 5 81 623 1739 1838 1962 2127 it^{z} vg^{ww} cop^{sa,bo} eth^{ro} Origen^{lat}).

== History ==
The place of origin is probably Asia Minor. The manuscript once belonged to Jean Hurault de Boistaillé, together with the manuscripts 10, 203, 301, 306, 314. The manuscripts was added to the list of New Testament manuscripts by Scholz (1794-1852). It was examined and described by Paulin Martin. C. R. Gregory saw the manuscript in 1885.

The manuscript is currently housed at the Bibliothèque nationale de France (Gr. 61) at Paris.

== See also ==
- List of New Testament minuscules
- Biblical manuscript
- Textual criticism
