= Minuscule 10 =

Greek minuscule manuscript of the New Testament

- New Testament manuscript
- Text: Gospels
- Date: 13th century
- Script: Greek
- Now at: National Library of France
- Size: 18.9 cm by 15 cm
- Type: mixed
- Category: none

Minuscule 10 is a Greek minuscule manuscript of the New Testament, made of parchment. It is designated by the siglum 10 in the Gregory-Aland numbering of New Testament manuscripts, and ε 372 in the von Soden numbering of New Testament manuscripts. Using the study of comparative writing styles (palaeography), it has been assigned to the 13th century. It has complex contents with full marginal notes.

== Description ==
The manuscript is a codex (precursor to the modern book format), containing the complete text of the four Gospels on 275 parchment leaves (sized 18.9 cm by 15 cm). The text is written in one column per page, 24 lines per page. The capital letters are written in red ink.

The text is divided according to the chapters (known as κεφαλαια / kephalaia), whose numbers are given in the margin, and their titles (known as τιτλοι / titloi) written at the top of the pages. Chapter numbers were also added in Latin by a later hand. There is also a division according to the Ammonian Sections (237 in Mark, the last in 16:14), with references to the Eusebian Canons written below the Ammonian section numbers. It contains the Epistle to Carpian, the Eusebian Canon tables, tables of contents (also known as κεφαλαια) before each Gospel, lectionary markings in the margin (for liturgical use), incipits, a synaxaria (liturgical book), and pictures.

== Text ==
The Greek text of the codex is considered to be a mixture of text-types, with the Byzantine text-type being the most dominant. It also has some Alexandrian readings, and some unique readings. Biblical scholar Kurt Aland did not place it in any Category of his New Testament manuscript classification system.

It is close textually to Codex Campianus (M / 021). According to the Claremont Profile Method (a specific analysis of textual data), it creates textual group M10.

== History ==
The earliest history of the manuscript is unknown, other than it came from Byzantium. According to the subscription it was given in 1439 to the Library of Canons Regular at Verona by Dorotheus, Archbishop of Mitylene, when he came to the Council of Florence in 1438. The manuscript once belonged to french nobleman and government official Jean Hurault de Boistaillé, as were the codices 9, 203, 263, 301, 306, and 314. It then belonged to the Archbishop of Reims, Charles Le Tellier (1671–1710), like codices 11 and 13.

It was used by philologist and textual critic Ludolph Küster in his edition of the Greek New Testament (as Paris 1). It was examined by biblical scholars Johann J. Griesbach and Johann M. A. Scholz. Scholz examined only the text of Mark 1-4 and John 5-8. It was examined and described by scholar Paulin Martin. Biblical scholar Caspar René Gregory saw the manuscript in 1885.

The manuscript is currently dated by the INTF to the 11th century. It is presently housed at the National Library of France (shelf number Gr. 91) in Paris.

== See also ==
- Minuscule 11
- Minuscule 9
- List of New Testament minuscules
- Textual criticism
- Biblical manuscripts
