= Lectionary 4 =

Lectionary ℓ 4
- New Testament manuscript
- Text: Evangelistarion †
- Date: 11th-century
- Script: Greek
- Now at: Cambridge University Library
- Size: 27.9 cm by 22.3 cm

Lectionary 4, designated by siglum ℓ 4 (in the Gregory-Aland numbering), is a Greek manuscript of the New Testament, on vellum leaves. Palaeographically it has been assigned to the 11th century.

== Description ==
The codex contains Lessons from the Gospels John, Matthew, and Luke lectionary (Evangelistarium). The text is written in Greek minuscule letters, on 199 parchment leaves (27.9 cm by 22.3 cm), 2 columns per page, 24–25 lines per page. It contains musical notes.

It contains synaxaria and Menologion. The pericope John 8:1–12 (not 8:3–11) is included.

The manuscript was examined by John Mill. It was added to the list of the New Testament manuscripts by Wettstein.

The manuscript is sporadically cited in the critical editions of the Greek New Testament of UBS (UBS3).

The codex now is located in the Cambridge University Library (Dd. 8.49) at Cambridge.

== See also ==
- List of New Testament lectionaries
- Biblical manuscript
- Textual criticism
- Lectionary 204

== Bibliography ==
- C. R. Gregory, "Textkritik des Neuen Testaments", Leipzig 1900, vol. 1, p. 387.
