= Minuscule 301 =

- New Testament manuscript
- Text: Gospels
- Date: 11th century
- Script: Greek
- Now at: Bibliothèque nationale de France
- Size: 34 cm by 26.5 cm
- Type: Byzantine text-type
- Category: V
- Note: marginalia

Minuscule 301 (in the Gregory-Aland numbering), A^{156} (Soden), is a Greek minuscule manuscript of the New Testament, on parchment. Palaeographically it has been assigned to the 11th century. It has marginalia.

== Description ==
The codex contains a complete text of the four Gospels on 221 parchment leaves (34 cm by 26.5 cm) with a commentary. The text is written in one column per page, the biblical text in 22 lines per page, the text of a commentary in 48 lines per page.

It contains tables of the κεφαλαια (tables of contents) before each Gospel, a division according to the Ammonian Sections, subscriptions at the end of each Gospel, and numbers of στιχοι. It lacks references to the Eusebian Canons.

Biblical text is surrounded by a catena. In the Gospel of Mark, the commentary is of Victorinus's authorship.

== Text ==
The Greek text of the codex is a representative of the Byzantine text-type. Aland placed it in Category V. According to the Claremont Profile Method it belongs to the textual family K^{x} and creates textual pair with Minuscule 373 in Luke 1, Luke 10, and Luke 20.

The Pericope Adulterae (John 7:53-8:11) is placed at the end of John.

== History ==
The manuscript once belonged to Jean Hurault de Boistaillé (like codices 10, 203, 263, 306, 314).

The manuscript was added to the list of New Testament manuscripts by Scholz (1794-1852). It was examined and described by Scholz, Paulin Martin, and C. R. Gregory.

The manuscript is currently housed at the Bibliothèque nationale de France (Gr. 187) at Paris.

== See also ==
- List of New Testament minuscules
- Biblical manuscript
- Textual criticism
