= Uncial 0141 =

- New Testament manuscript
- Text: John †
- Date: 10th century
- Script: Greek
- Now at: Bibliothèque nationale de France
- Size: 28 x 20 cm
- Type: mixed
- Category: III

Uncial 0141 (in the Gregory-Aland numbering), C^{L13} (Soden), is a Greek uncial manuscript of the New Testament, dated palaeographically to the 10th century.

== Description ==
The codex contains a verse-by-verse commentary in minuscule on the Gospel of John with some lacunae, on 349 parchment leaves (28 cm by 20 cm). The text is written in two columns per page, 31 lines per page, with about one verse per page written in uncial letters.

== Text ==
The Greek text of this codex is a representative of the mixed text-type with the Byzantine predominating. Aland placed it in Category III.

It does not contain verse John 5:4, and the Pericope Adulterae (John 7:53-8:11). In John 1:38 it has an error (εθερμηνευομενον instead of μεθερμηνευομενον).

In John 1:29 it lacks ο Ιωαννης along with manuscripts Sinaiticus, Alexandrinus, Vaticanus, Cyprius, Campianus, Petropolitanus Purpureus, Vaticanus 354, Nanianus, Macedoniensis, Sangallensis, Koridethi, Petropolitanus, Athous Lavrensis, 045, 047, 8, 9, 565, 1192;

In John 3:5 it reads βασιλειαν των ουρανων for βασιλειαν του θεου. The reading is supported by Codex Sinaiticus.

In John 3:13 it has reading ανθρωπου ο ων εκ του ουρανου for ανθρωπου, the reading is supported only by minuscule 80 and syr^{c};

== History ==
C. R. Gregory dated the manuscript to the 10th century. Currently it is dated by the INTF to the 10th century.

The manuscripts once belonged to Jean Hurault de Boistaillé along with other manuscripts of the New Testament (e.g. 10).

It was added to the list of the New Testament manuscripts by Johann Martin Augustin Scholz. It was examined by Dean Burgon and Paulin Martin.

It is currently housed at the Bibliothèque nationale de France (Gr. 209) in Paris.

== See also ==
- List of New Testament uncials
- Biblical manuscript
- Textual criticism
