= Minuscule 8 =

Greek minuscule manuscript of the New Testament

- New Testament manuscript
- Text: Gospels
- Date: 11th century
- Script: Greek
- Now at: National Library of France
- Size: 28.7 cm by 21.8 cm
- Type: Byzantine text-type
- Category: V
- Hand: beautifully written
- Note: full marginalia

Minuscule 8 is a Greek minuscule manuscript of the New Testament, made of parchment. It is designated by the siglum 8 in the Gregory-Aland numbering of New Testament manuscripts, and ε 164 in the von Soden numbering of New Testament manuscripts. Using the study of comparative writing styles (palaeography), it has been assigned to the 11th century. It has complex contents and full marginal notes.

== Description ==
The manuscript is a codex (precursor to the modern book format), containing the complete text of the four Gospels, on 199 parchment leaves (sized 28.7 cm by 21.8 cm). The text is written in two columns per page, 22 lines per page. The initial letters are written in red ink.

The text is divided according to the chapters (known as κεφαλαια / kephalaia), whose numbers are given in the margin, and their titles (known as τιτλοι / titloi) written at the top of the pages. There is also a division according to the Ammonian Sections, with references to the Eusebian Canons.

It contains the Epistle to Carpian, the Eusebian Canon tables, prolegomena, pictures, lectionary markings in the margin (for liturgical use), a Menologion, and a Synaxarion. The passages of John 5:3–4 and the Pericope Adulterae (John 7:53-8:11) are marked with an obelus, indicating doubt as to their authenticity.

== Text ==
The Greek text of the codex is considered to be a representative of the Byzantine text-type. Hermann von Soden classified it to the textual family Family K^{x}. Biblical scholar Kurt Aland placed it in Category V of his New Testament manuscript classification system. Category V manuscripts are described as "manuscripts with a purely or predominantly Byzantine text." According to the Claremont Profile Method (a specific analysis of textual data), it represents K^{x} in Luke 1, Luke 10, and Luke 20.

Example of variant reading

John 1:29

omit - 8 א A B K M S U Y Δ Θ Π Ψ Ω 047 0141 9. 565. 1192.
ο Ιωαννης (John) - Majority of Manuscripts.

== History ==
The earliest history of the manuscript is unknown. It formerly belonged to Antonelli Petrucci, a secretary of Ferdinand I, king of Naples, and then to Fontainebleau. Biblical scholar Robert Estienne used the text from this codex in his Editio Regia of the Greek New Testament (1550), in which it was designated as ζ'. Accordingly, its readings became a part of the Textus Receptus.

It was examined by biblical scholars Johann J. Wettstein and Johann M. A. Scholz, although Scholz only examined the Gospel of John. It was examined and described by scholar Paulin Martin. Biblical scholar Caspar René Gregory saw the manuscript in 1884.

The manuscript is currently dated by the INTF to the 11th century. It is presently housed at the National Library of France (shelf number Gr. 49) in Paris.

== See also ==
- Minuscule 9
- Minuscule 7
- List of New Testament minuscules
- Textual criticism
