= Lectionary 11 =

Lectionary ℓ 11
- New Testament manuscript
- Text: Evangelistarion †
- Date: 13th-century
- Script: Greek
- Now at: Bibliothèque Nationale de France
- Size: 30 cm by 23 cm

Lectionary 11, designated by siglum ℓ 11 (in the Gregory-Aland numbering), is a Greek manuscript of the New Testament, on vellum leaves. Paleographically, it has been assigned to the 13th-century. Formerly, it was known as Codex Regius 309.

== Description ==
The codex contains lessons from the Gospels lectionary (Evangelistarium) with some lacunae. It is written in Greek minuscule letters, on 142 parchment leaves (30 cm by 23 cm), 2 columns per page, 22 or more lines per page. It contains musical notes.

The manuscript once belonged to Colbert, as lectionaries ℓ 7, ℓ 8, ℓ 9, ℓ 10, ℓ 12. It was added to the list of the New Testament manuscripts by Wettstein. It was examined by Scholz (1794–1852) and Paulin Martin. Gregory saw it in 1885.

The manuscript is sporadically cited in the critical editions of the Greek New Testament (UBS3).

The codex is located now at the Bibliothèque Nationale de France (Gr. 309) at Paris.

== See also ==
- List of New Testament lectionaries
- Biblical manuscript
- Textual criticism
