= Lectionary 9 =

Lectionary ℓ 9
- New Testament manuscript
- Text: Evangelistarion †
- Date: 13th-century
- Script: Greek
- Now at: Bibliothèque Nationale de France
- Size: 30 cm by 23.8 cm

Lectionary 9, designated by sigla ℓ 9 (in the Gregory-Aland numbering). It is a Greek manuscript of the New Testament, on vellum leaves. Palaeographically it has been assigned to the 13th-century.

== Description ==
The codex is a lectionary, it contains lessons from the Gospels: John, Matthew, Luke (Evangelistarium). It is written in Greek minuscule letters, on 260 parchment leaves (30 cm by 23.8 cm), 2 columns per page, 24 lines per page. It contains music notes.

== History ==
The manuscript once belonged to Colbert, as lectionaries ℓ 7, ℓ 8, ℓ 10, ℓ 11, ℓ 12. It was examined and described by Wettstein, Scholz, and Paulin Martin. It was added to the list of the New Testament manuscripts by Wettstein. C. R. Gregory saw the manuscript in 1885.

The manuscript is not cited in the critical editions of the Greek New Testament of UBS (UBS3).

The codex now is located in the Bibliothèque Nationale de France (Gr. 307) at Paris.

== See also ==
- List of New Testament lectionaries
- Biblical manuscript
- Textual criticism

== Bibliography ==
- Gregory, Caspar René (1900). Textkritik des Neuen Testaments. Vol. 1. Leipzig: J. C. Hinrichs. p. 388.
