= Lectionary 8 =

Lectionary ℓ 8
- New Testament manuscript
- Text: Evangelistarion †
- Date: 14th-century
- Script: Greek
- Now at: Bibliothèque Nationale de France
- Size: 34 cm by 28 cm

Lectionary 8, designated by sigla ℓ 8 (in the Gregory-Aland numbering). It is a Greek manuscript of the New Testament, on vellum leaves. Palaeographically it has been assigned to the 14th-century.

== Description ==
The codex contains lessons from the Gospels: John, Matthew, and Luke. It is a lectionary (Evangelistarium). It is written in Greek minuscule letters, on 309 parchment leaves (34 cm by 28 cm), 2 columns per page, 28 lines per page. It has not music notes. It uses "ι subscriptum".

== History ==
The manuscript was written by Cosmas, a monk.

The manuscript once belonged to Colbert, along with lectionaries ℓ 7, ℓ 9, ℓ 10, ℓ 11, ℓ 12. It was examined by Wettstein, and Scholz, and Paulin Martin. It was added to the list of the New Testament manuscripts by Wettstein. Gregory saw the manuscript in 1885.

The manuscript is not cited in the critical editions of the Greek New Testament of UBS (UBS3).

The codex now is located in the Bibliothèque Nationale de France (Gr. 312) at Paris.

== See also ==
- List of New Testament lectionaries
- Biblical manuscript
- Textual criticism

== Bibliography ==
- Gregory, Caspar René (1900). Textkritik des Neuen Testaments. Vol. 1. Leipzig: J. C. Hinrichs. p. 388.
