= Lectionary 7 =

Lectionary ℓ 7
- New Testament manuscript
- Text: Evangelistarion †
- Date: 1204
- Script: Greek
- Now at: Bibliothèque Nationale de France
- Size: 30.9 cm by 23.2 cm

Lectionary 7, designated by siglum ℓ 7 (in the Gregory-Aland numbering). It is a Greek manuscript of the New Testament, on vellum leaves. It is dated by a colophon to the year 1204.

== Description ==
The codex contains Lessons from the Gospels lectionary (Evangelistarium) with lacunae. It is written in Greek minuscule letters, on 316 parchment leaves (30.9 cm by 23.2 cm), 2 columns per page, 23 lines per page. It contains music notes.

== History ==
The manuscript was written by priest Georg Rhodiu (from Rhodos?).

The manuscript once belonged to Colbert, as lectionaries ℓ 8, ℓ 9, ℓ 10, ℓ 11, ℓ 12. It was examined and described by Montfaucon, Wettstein, Scholz, and Paulin Martin. It was added to the list of the New Testament manuscripts by Wettstein. Gregory saw the manuscript in 1885.

The text was edited by Henri Omont.

The manuscript is sporadically cited in the critical editions of the Greek New Testament of UBS (UBS3).

The codex now is located in the Bibliothèque Nationale de France (Gr. 301) at Paris.

== See also ==
- List of New Testament lectionaries
- Biblical manuscript
- Textual criticism

== Bibliography ==
- Henri Omont, Fac-similés des plus anciens mss. grecs de la Bibliothèque Nationale du IVe et XIII siècle, (Paris, 1892), p. 18.
