= Editio Regia =

Edition of the Greek New Testament of Robert Estienne

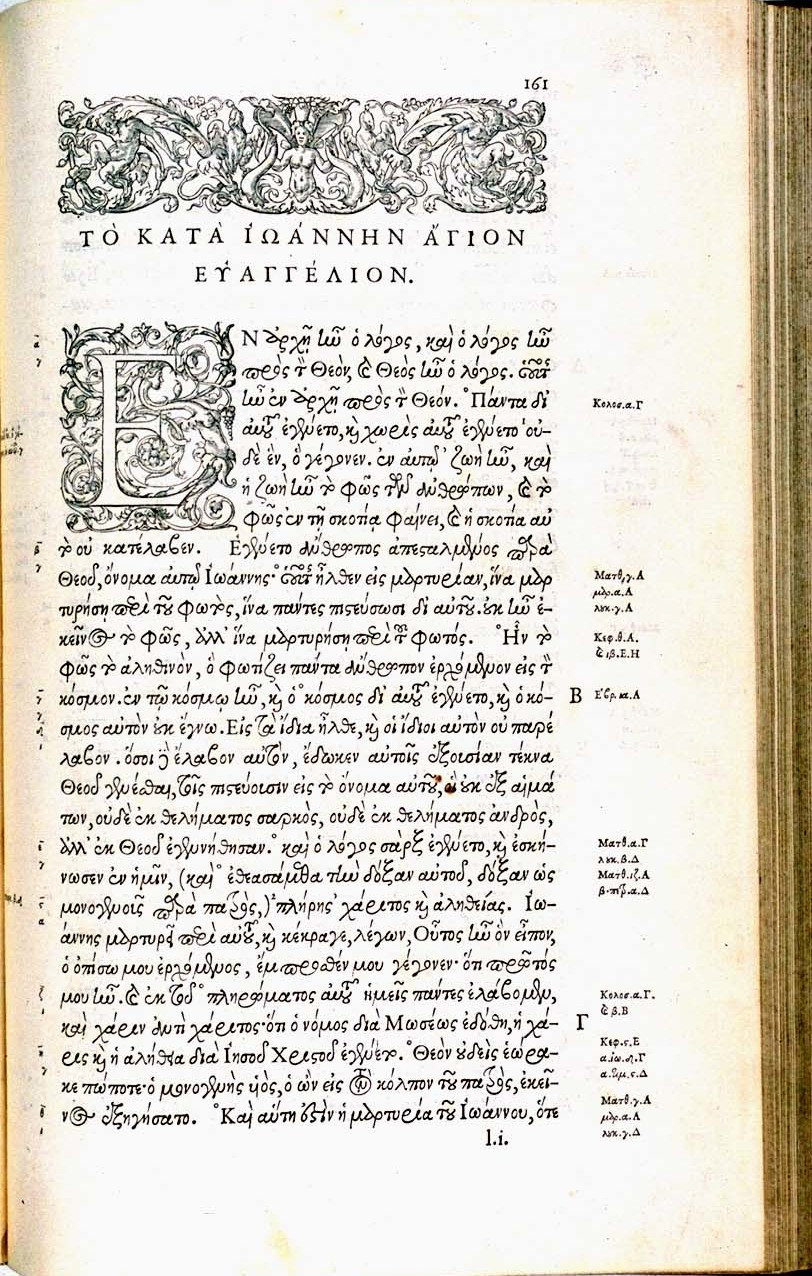
Third edition of Estienne's New Testament opened to the beginning of the Gospel of John

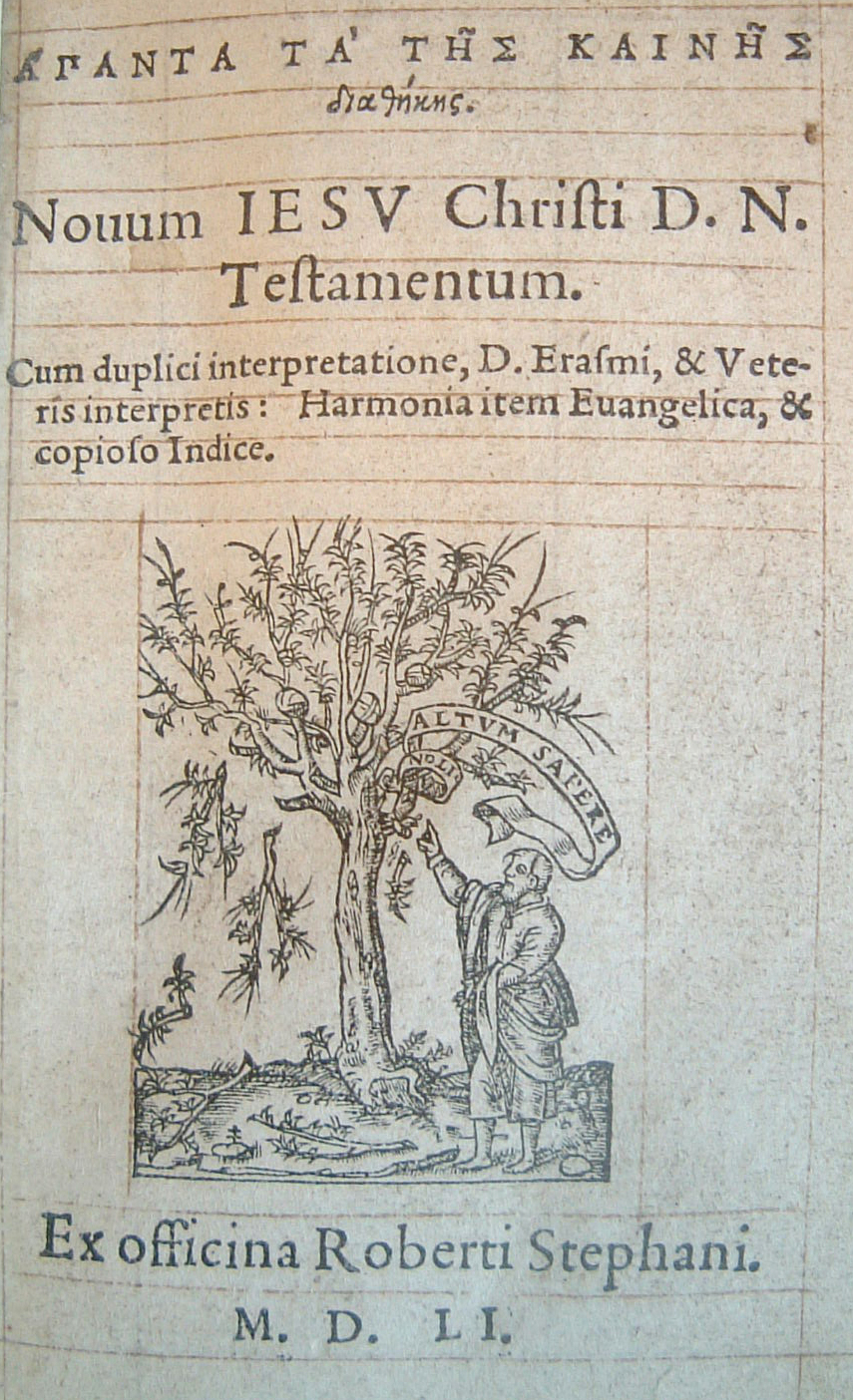
Fourth edition of New Testament of Robert Estienne

Editio Regia (Royal edition) is the third and most important edition of the Greek New Testament printed by Robert Estienne (1503–1559). It is the basis for the Textus Receptus, the Greek New Testament that formed the foundation for Protestant Bible translators who preferred the original Koine Greek for a source text. It was named Editio Regia because of the beautiful and elegant Greek typeface it uses, known as the Grecs du roi.

== Third edition ==
Editio Regia was edited by Estienne in 1550 at Paris. It is the first Greek Testament that has a critical apparatus for comparing textual variants. Estienne entered on the margins of the pages variant readings from 15 Greek manuscripts as well as many readings from the Complutensian Polyglot, itself based on several Greek manuscripts. He designated all these sources by symbols from α' to ιϛ'. The Complutensian Polyglot was signified by α'. The critical collation was novel, and although Estienne omitted hundreds of important variants from used witnesses, it was a significant early step towards textual criticism of the New Testament and the eclecticism it embraces.

The oldest manuscript used in this edition was the Codex Bezae, which had been collated for him "by friends in Italy" (secundo exemplar vetustissimum in Italia ab amicis collatum). The majority of these manuscripts are held in the National Library of France to the present day. Estienne made only a few changes in the Erasmian Novum Testamentum: for example, he added verse Luke 17:36, which he took from Codex Bezae.

The Stephanus text of the O mirificam editions of 1546 (first) and 1549 (second) had been a composition of the Complutensian and Erasmian texts. The 1550 (third) edition (the Editio Regia proper) approaches more closely to the Erasmian fourth and fifth editions. According to John Mill, the first and second editions differ in 67 places, and the third in 284 places. The third edition became for many scholars, especially in England, the normative text of the Greek New Testament.

== Further works ==
After moving to Geneva in 1551 to escape the persecution of the Catholic censors at the College of Sorbonne (i.e. the University of Paris), Stephanus continued to publish religious texts. The 1551 (fourth) edition of his Greek New Testament used exactly the same text as the third without a critical apparatus. It was a parallel Bible that included the Latin Vulgate and the Erasmus Greek surrounding the critical text. Estienne added novel textual divisions that he numbered. These numbered verses were the first time a Greek New Testament had been printed with such divisions.

The fourth edition was used for the Geneva Bible (1557, 1560) and Theodore Beza's Latin/Greek New Testaments that he published in 1565, 1582, 1588, 1598. The Beza Greek New Testament was used by the translators of the King James Version of the English Bible, published in 1611.

Robert Estienne also used verse numbering in later works. He printed a Hebrew Bible in 1553, following the verse divisions of Sanctus Pagninus. He published a French Bible in 1553 with verses for both the Old Testament and the New, a first of its kind. He then printed a Latin Bible in 1557, which included verses in both Testaments. The Geneva Bible followed these divisions, thus establishing the chapter and verse format for English Bibles that are still being used today.

== Manuscripts and sources used in Editio Regia ==
In his preface Estienne said that he had used sixteen manuscripts as his sources.

| Sign | Name | Date | Content | Institution |
|---|---|---|---|---|
| α' | Complutensian Polyglot | 16th | New Testament | University of Alcala |
| β' | Codex Bezae | 5th | Gospels, Acts | University of Cambridge |
| γ' | Minuscule 4 | 13th | Gospels | National Library of France |
| δ' | Minuscule 5 | 13th | New Testament (except the Book of Revelation) | National Library of France |
| ε' | Minuscule 6 | 13th | New Testament (except Rev) | National Library of France |
| ϛ' | Minuscule 2817 | 12th | Pauline epistles | University of Basel |
| ζ' | Minuscule 8 | 11th | Gospels | National Library of France |
| η' | Codex Regius | 8th | Gospels | National Library of France |
| θ' | Minuscule 38 | 12th | New Testament (except Rev) | National Library of France |
| ι' | Minuscule 2298 ? | 11th | Acts, Pauline epistles | National Library of France |
| ια' | Unidentified | | | |
| ιβ' | Minuscule 9 | 1167 | Gospels | National Library of France |
| ιγ' | Minuscule 398 | | | University of Cambridge, Kk. 6.4 (?) |
| ιδ' | Codex Victorinus, 774 (Minuscule 120) | | | |
| ιε' | Minuscule 237 (?) | | | |
| ιϛ' | Unidentified | | | |
| ? | Minuscule 42 | | | |
| ? | Minuscule 111 | | | |

Manuscripts γ', δ', ε', ϛ', ζ', η', ι', ιε' were taken from the King Henry II's Library (Royal Library of France, now Bibliothèque nationale de France). It was suggested by Wettstein that θ' means Codex Coislinianus (it came to France ca. 1650, and was not available in time of Estienne).

== See also ==
- Complutensian Polyglot Bible
- Novum Instrumentum omne
- Textus Receptus
