= Minuscule 80 =

- New Testament manuscript
- Name: Codex T. G. Graevii
- Text: Gospels
- Date: 12th century
- Script: Greek
- Now at: Bibliothèque nationale de France
- Size: 23.3 cm by 16.2 cm
- Type: Byzantine text-type
- Category: V
- Note: close to 140

Minuscule 80 (in the Gregory-Aland numbering), ε 281 (von Soden), known as Cod. T. G. Graevii, is a Greek minuscule manuscript of the New Testament, on parchment leaves. Palaeographically it has been assigned to the 12th century. The manuscript has complex contents. It has marginalia.

== Description ==
The codex contains complete text of the four Gospels with a commentary on 309 parchment leaves (size 23.3 cm by 16.2 cm). The text is written in one column per page, 23 lines per page. The initial letters are in colour.

The text is divided according to the κεφαλαια (chapters), whose numbers of at the margin, the τιτλοι (titles of chapters) at the top of the pages. In the 15th century the Latin chapters were added.

It contains Prolegomena, tables of the κεφαλαια (tables of contents) before each Gospel, and subscriptions at the end of each Gospel.

== Text ==
=== Text-type ===
The Greek text of the codex is a representative of the Byzantine text-type. Aland placed it in Category V. It is close textually to the minuscule 140.

It was not examined by using the Claremont Profile Method.

=== Textual variants ===
In Luke 3:23-38 (Genealogy of Jesus) it was rewritten from a three-column text, and columns were confused, and instead of copying them vertically in proper succession, the scribe copied the genealogy as though the two columns were one, following the lines across both columns. As a result, almost everyone is made the son of the wrong father: του Ιωραμ, του Καιναν, του Ιωδη, του Εσρωμ, του Ενος (see Minuscule 109).

In John 3:13 it has reading ανθρωπου ο ων εκ του ουρανου for ανθρωπου, the reading is supported only by Uncial 0141 and Syriac Curetonian (syr^{c});

== History ==
It once belonged to Johannes Georg Graeve (hence name of the codex) and was collated by Anthony Bynaeus in 1691 (see minuscule 579). Then it passed into the hands Johannes van der Hagen, who showed it to Wettstein in 1739.

It is currently housed in at the Bibliothèque nationale de France (Smith-Lasouëf 5), at Paris.

== See also ==
- List of New Testament minuscules
- Biblical manuscript
- Textual criticism
