= Minuscule 12 =

- New Testament manuscript
- Text: Gospels
- Date: 11th century
- Script: Greek
- Now at: National Library of France
- Size: 26 cm by 20 cm
- Type: Byzantine text-type
- Category: V

Minuscule 12 is a Greek minuscule manuscript of the New Testament, made of parchment. It is designated by the siglum 12 in the Gregory-Aland numbering of New Testament manuscripts, and A^{137} in the von Soden numbering of New Testament manuscripts. Using the study of comparative writing styles (palaeography), it has been assigned to the 11th century.

== Description ==
The manuscript is a codex (precursor to the modern book format), containing the complete text of the four Gospels written on 294 parchment leaves (sized 26 cm by 20 cm), with a commentary. The text is written in one column per page, the biblical text in 21 lines, and the commentary in 57 lines per page. The ink is brown. The commentary to Matthew and John is of John Chrysostom's authorship; the commentary to Mark is of Victorinus of Pettau; and the commentary to Luke is from Titus of Bostra.

The text is divided according to the chapters (known as κεφαλαια / kephalaia), whose numbers are given in the margin, and their titles (known as τιτλοι / titloi) written at the top of the pages. There is also a division according to the Ammonian Sections, with references to the Eusebian Canons.

It contains the Epistle to Carpius, Eusebian Canon tables, prolegomena, the tables of contents (also known as κεφαλαια) before each Gospel, liturgical books with hagiographies (Menologion and Synaxarium), and subscriptions at the end of each Gospel.

== Text ==
The Greek text of the codex is considered to be a representative of the Byzantine text-type, with a few alien readings. Biblical scholar Kurt Aland placed it in Category V of his New Testament manuscript classification system. Category V manuscripts are described as "manuscripts with a purely or predominantly Byzantine text."

Scholar Frederik Wisse did not examine it using his Claremont Profile Method (a specific analysis of textual data).

The text of the Pericope Adulterae (John 7:53-8:11) is omitted. The text of Mark 16:9-20 has a note of Victor's.

== History ==
The earliest history of the manuscript is unknown. It was added to the list of the New Testament manuscripts by biblical scholar Johann J. Wettstein, who gave it the number 12. It was examined and described by Wettstein, textual critic Johann J. Griesbach, and scholar Paulin Martin. Biblical scholar Caspar René Gregory saw the manuscript in 1885.

It is currently dated by the INTF to the 11th century. It is presently housed at the National Library of France (shelf number Gr. 230) in Paris.

== See also ==
- Minuscule 13
- Minuscule 11
- List of New Testament minuscules
- Textual criticism
