= Lectionary 100 =

Lectionary ℓ 100
- New Testament manuscript
- Text: Evangelistarion
- Date: 1550
- Script: Greek
- Now at: Bibliothèque nationale de France
- Size: 21 cm by 15 cm

Lectionary 100, designated by siglum ℓ 100 (in the Gregory-Aland numbering), is a Greek manuscript of the New Testament, on paper leaves. It is dated by a colophon to the year 1550.

== Description ==
The codex contains lessons from the Gospels of John, Matthew, Luke lectionary (Evangelistarium). It is written in Greek minuscule letters, on 306 paper leaves (21 cm by 15 cm). The text stands in one column per page, 20 lines per page. It contains the most of Pericope Adulterae (John 8:1-11).

== History ==
The manuscript was written in Iconium by Micheal Maurice. The manuscript once belonged to Colbert (as did ℓ 87, ℓ 88, ℓ 89, ℓ 90, ℓ 91, ℓ 99, ℓ 101).

Scholz examined some parts of it. Scholz wrongly gave number Ev. 328 for it. It was examined and described by Paulin Martin. Gregory saw it in 1885.

The manuscript is not cited in the critical editions of the Greek New Testament (UBS3).

Currently the codex is located in the Bibliothèque nationale de France (Gr. 381) in Paris.

== See also ==
- List of New Testament lectionaries
- Biblical manuscript
- Textual criticism

== Bibliography ==
- Jean-Pierre-Paul Martin, Description technique des manuscrits grecs, relatif au N. T., conservé dans les bibliothèques des Paris (Paris 1883), p. 162.
