= Lectionary 99 =

Lectionary ℓ 99
- New Testament manuscript
- Text: Evangelistarion
- Date: 16th-century
- Script: Greek
- Now at: Bibliothèque nationale de France
- Size: 21 cm by 15 cm

Lectionary 99, designated by siglum ℓ 99 (in the Gregory-Aland numbering), is a Greek manuscript of the New Testament, on paper leaves. Palaeographically it has been assigned to the 16th century.

== Description ==
The codex contains lessons from the Gospels of John, Matthew, Luke lectionary (Evangelistarium) with some lacunae. It is written in Greek minuscule letters, on 243 paper leaves (21 cm by 15 cm). The text stands in one column per page, 22 lines per page.

== History ==
The manuscript once belonged to Colbert (as did ℓ 87, ℓ 88, ℓ 89, ℓ 90, ℓ 91, ℓ 100, ℓ 101).

Johann Martin Augustin Scholz examined some parts of it. He wrongly gave number Ev. 327 for it.

It was examined and described by Paulin Martin. C. R. Gregory saw it in 1885.

The manuscript is not cited in the critical editions of the Greek New Testament (UBS3).

Currently the codex is located in the Bibliothèque nationale de France (Gr. 380) in Paris.

== See also ==
- List of New Testament lectionaries
- Biblical manuscript
- Textual criticism

== Bibliography ==
- Jean-Pierre-Paul Martin, Description technique des manuscrits grecs, relatif au N. T., conservé dans les bibliothèques des Paris (Paris 1883), p. 162.
