= Lectionary 90 =

Lectionary ℓ 90
- New Testament manuscript
- Text: Evangelistarion
- Date: 1553
- Script: Greek
- Now at: Bibliothèque nationale de France
- Size: 29.6 cm by 20.1 cm

Lectionary 90, designated by siglum ℓ 90 (in the Gregory-Aland numbering), is a Greek manuscript of the New Testament, on paper leaves. It is dated by a colophon to the year 1553.

== Description ==
The codex contains lessons from the Gospels of John, Matthew, Luke lectionary (Evangelistarium) with some lacunae. It is written in Greek minuscule letters, on 208 paper leaves (29.6 cm by 20.1 cm). The writing is in 2 columns per page, 25 lines per page.

It contains the Pericope Adulterae (John 8:3-11). It contains musical notes.

== History ==
The manuscript was written by Stephen, a scribe. The manuscript once belonged to Colbert's (as were ℓ 87, ℓ 88, ℓ 89, ℓ 91, ℓ 99, ℓ 100, ℓ 101).

Scholz examined some parts of it. It was examined and described by Paulin Martin. C. R. Gregory saw it in 1885.

The manuscript is not cited in the critical editions of the Greek New Testament (UBS3).

Currently the codex is located in the Bibliothèque nationale de France (Gr. 317) in Paris.

== See also ==
- List of New Testament lectionaries
- Biblical manuscript
- Textual criticism

== Bibliography ==
- Jean-Pierre-Paul Martin, Description technique des manuscrits grecs, relatif au N. T., conservé dans les bibliothèques des Paris (Paris 1883), p. 159
