= Minuscule 140 =

Greek minuscule manuscript of the New Testament

- New Testament manuscript
- Text: Gospels
- Date: 13th century
- Script: Greek
- Now at: Vatican Library
- Size: 23.4 cm by 18.3 cm
- Type: Byzantine text-type
- Hand: beautifully written
- Note: close to 80

Minuscule 140 (in the Gregory-Aland numbering), ε 202 (Soden), is a Greek minuscule manuscript of the New Testament, on parchment leaves. Palaeographically it has been assigned to the 13th century. The codex has complex contents, with full marginalia.

== Description ==
The codex contains a complete text of the four Gospels on 408 parchment leaves (partly on paper) (size 23.4 cm by 18.3 cm). The text is written in two columns per page, 22 lines per page.

The text is divided according to the κεφαλαια (chapters), which numbers are given at the margin of the text, and their τιτλοι (titles of chapters) at the top of the pages. There is also another division according to the smaller Ammonian Sections (in Mark 234 sections – the last numbered section in 16:9), with references to the Eusebian Canons.

It contains the Eusebian Canon tables at the beginning and pictures.

== Text ==
The Greek text of the codex is a representative of the Byzantine text-type. Hermann von Soden classified it to the textual family K^{x}. Aland placed it in Category V. According to the Claremont Profile Method it represents K^{x} in Luke 1 and Luke 20. In Luke 10 no profile was made.

Textually it is close to minuscule 80. In Luke 1:64 it has a textual variant that supports the Complutensian reading.

== History ==
The manuscript was given by the Queen of Cyprus to pope Innocent VII (1404-1406).

It was examined by Birch (about 1782), Scholz, and Franz Delitzsch. C. R. Gregory saw the manuscript in 1886.

It is currently housed at the Vatican Library (Vat. gr. 1158), at Rome.

== See also ==
- List of New Testament minuscules
- Biblical manuscript
- Textual criticism
