= Lectionary 89 =

Lectionary ℓ 89
- New Testament manuscript
- Text: Evangelistarion
- Date: 14th-century
- Script: Greek
- Now at: Bibliothèque nationale de France
- Size: 25.8 cm by 17 cm

Lectionary 89, designated by siglum ℓ 89 (in the Gregory-Aland numbering), is a Greek manuscript of the New Testament, on cotton paper leaves. Palaeographically it has been assigned to the 14th-century.

== Description ==
The codex contains lessons from the Gospels of John, Matthew, Luke lectionary (Evangelistarium) with some lacunae. It is written in Greek minuscule letters, on 190 paper leaves (25.8 cm by 17 cm). The writing is in 1 column per page, 25 lines per page. It contains the Pericope Adultera (John 8:3-11).

== History ==
The manuscript once belonged to Colbert's (as were lectionaries: ℓ 87, ℓ 88, ℓ 90, ℓ 91, ℓ 99, ℓ 100, ℓ 101).

Scholz examined part of it. It was examined and described by Paulin Martin. C. R. Gregory saw it in 1885.

The manuscript is not cited in the critical editions of the Greek New Testament (UBS3).

Currently the codex is located in the Bibliothèque nationale de France (Gr. 316) in Paris.

== See also ==
- List of New Testament lectionaries
- Biblical manuscript
- Textual criticism

== Bibliography ==
- Jean-Pierre-Paul Martin, Description technique des manuscrits grecs, relatif au N. T., conservé dans les bibliothèques des Paris (Paris 1883), p. 159
