= Lectionary 91 =

Lectionary ℓ 91
- New Testament manuscript
- Text: Evangelistarion
- Date: 14th century
- Script: Greek
- Found: 1553
- Now at: Bibliothèque nationale de France
- Size: 26.6 cm by 19.7 cm

Lectionary 91, designated by siglum ℓ 91 (in the Gregory-Aland numbering), is a Greek manuscript of the New Testament, on vellum leaves. Palaeographically it has been assigned to the 14th century.

== Description ==
The codex contains lessons from the Gospels of John, Matthew, Luke lectionary (Evangelistarium) with some lacunae. It is written in Greek minuscule letters, on 322 parchment leaves (26.6 cm by 19.7 cm). The writing is in 2 columns per page, 23 lines per page. It contains subscriptions at the end.

== History ==
The manuscript was written in Cyprus, by monk Leontius. It once belonged to Colbert's (as were ℓ 87, ℓ 88, ℓ 89, ℓ 90, ℓ 99, ℓ 100, ℓ 101).

It was partially examined and described by Bernard de Montfaucon, Scholz, and Paulin Martin. C. R. Gregory saw it in 1885.

The manuscript is not cited in the critical editions of the Greek New Testament (UBS3).

Currently the codex is located in the Bibliothèque nationale de France (Gr. 318) in Paris.

== See also ==
- List of New Testament lectionaries
- Biblical manuscript
- Textual criticism

== Bibliography ==
- Bernard de Montfaucon, Palaeographia Graeca (Paris 1708), p. 89.
