= Lectionary 88 =

Lectionary ℓ 88
- New Testament manuscript
- Text: Evangelistarion
- Date: 14th-century
- Script: Greek
- Now at: Bibliothèque nationale de France
- Size: 32.6 cm by 18 cm

Lectionary 88, designated by siglum ℓ 88 (in the Gregory-Aland numbering), is a Greek manuscript of the New Testament, on paper leaves. Palaeographically it has been assigned to the 14th-century.

== Description ==
The codex contains lessons from the Gospels of John, Matthew, Luke lectionary (Evangelistarium) with numerous lacunae. It is written in Greek minuscule letters, on 190 paper leaves (32.6 cm by 18 cm). The writing stands in 2 columns per page, 22-26 lines per page.

Two pages of the manuscript belong to the codex 0115.

== History ==
The manuscript once belonged to Colbert's (as were ℓ 87, ℓ 89, ℓ 90, ℓ 91, ℓ 99, ℓ 100, ℓ 101).

Scholz examined some passages of it. It was examined and described by Paulin Martin. C. R. Gregory saw it in 1883.

The manuscript is not cited in the critical editions of the Greek New Testament (UBS3).

Currently the codex is located in the Bibliothèque nationale de France (Gr. 314) in Paris.

== See also ==
- List of New Testament lectionaries
- Biblical manuscript
- Textual criticism
