= Minuscule 38 =

- New Testament manuscript
- Text: Gospels, Acts, Paul†
- Date: 12th century
- Script: Greek
- Now at: National Library of France
- Size: 17.5 cm by 14 cm
- Type: Byzantine text-type
- Category: none
- Note: marginalia

Minuscule 38 is a Greek minuscule manuscript of the New Testament, written on vellum. It is designated by the siglum 38 in the Gregory-Aland numbering of New Testament manuscripts, and δ 355 in the von Soden numbering of New Testament manuscripts. Using the study of comparative handwriting styles (palaeography), it has been assigned to the 12th century.

It was formerly labelled a 38^{e}, 19^{a}, or 377^{p} in previous manuscript lists. The manuscript has some missing portions, and marginal notes.

== Description ==
The manuscript is a codex (precursor to the modern book format), containing the complete text of the four Gospels, Acts, the Pauline Epistles and the Catholic Epistles on 300 parchment leaves, with some missing portions: Matthew 14:15-15:30; 20:14-21:37; Mark 12:3-13:4. The text is written 1 column per page, 30 lines per page, in a text-block sized 17.5 cm by 14 cm.

The text is divided according to the chapters (known as κεφαλαια / kephalaia), whose numbers are given in the margin, and their titles (known as τιτλοι / titloi) written at the top of the pages. There is also a division according to the Ammonian Sections in the Gospels (241 in Mark, ending at Mark 16:20), but without references to the Eusebian Canons (both early divisions of the Gospels into sections).

The Catholic epistles and Pauline epistles are divided according to the Euthalian Apparatus, but there are no κεφαλαια or τιτλοι. It contains pictures, and notes in the margin in Greek.

== Text ==
The Greek text of the codex is considered to be a representative of the Byzantine text-type. Kurt Aland did not place it in any Category of his New Testament manuscript classification system. According to the Claremont Profile Method (a specific analysis of textual data), it represents textual family K^{x} in Luke 1, Luke 10, and Luke 20.

== History ==
The manuscript was written on the order of Michael VIII Palaiologos (1260-1282), and was presented to Louis IX, King of France, in 1269 or 1270. Textual critic Johann J. Wettstein rightly judged that it was used by Robert Estienne in his Editio Regia as θ'. The text of the manuscript was collated by Wettstein.

It was examined and described by Paulin Martin. It was added to the list of the New Testament manuscripts by Wettstein. Biblical scholar Caspar René Gregory saw the manuscript in 1885.

The manuscript was dated by Gregory to the 13th century. It is currently been assigned by the INTF to the 12th century. It is presently housed in the Bibliothèque nationale de France (shelf number Coislin Gr. 200) in Paris.

== See also ==
- List of New Testament minuscules
- Biblical manuscripts
- Textual criticism
