= Minuscule 285 =

- New Testament manuscript
- Text: Gospels
- Date: 15th century
- Script: Greek
- Now at: Bibliothèque nationale de France
- Size: 19.8 cm by 13.8 cm
- Type: Byzantine, member of K^{r}
- Category: V
- Note: marginalia

Minuscule 285 (in the Gregory-Aland numbering), ε 527 (Soden), is a Greek minuscule manuscript of the New Testament, on parchment. Paleographically it has been assigned to the 15th century. It has marginalia.

== Description ==
The codex contains a complete text of the four Gospels on 246 parchment leaves (19.9 cm by 13.8 cm). The text is written in one column per page, in 22 lines per page.

The text is divided according to the κεφαλαια (chapters), whose numbers are given at the margin.

It contains the Epistula ad Carpianum, lists of the κεφαλαια (lists of contents) before each Gospel, subscriptions at the end of each Gospel, and pictures.

== Text ==
The Greek text of the codex is a representative of the Byzantine text-type. Hermann von Soden classified it to the textual family K^{r}. Aland placed it in Category V. According to the Claremont Profile Method it represents to the textual family K^{r} in Luke 1 and Luke 20. In Luke 10 no profile was made. It is weak member of textual cluster 20.

The text of the Pericope Adulterae (John 7:53-8:11) is marked by an obelus.

== History ==
The manuscript once belonged to Teller's. It was presented by Augustin Justinian to Giovanni Maria Catanaeo from Navara († 1529). It was used by Kuster's, who designated it as Paris 1. It was added to the list of New Testament manuscripts by Scholz (1794-1852). It was examined by Wettstein, Griesbach, Scholz, and Gregory (1885). It was examined and described by Paulin Martin. C. R. Gregory saw the manuscript in 1885.

The manuscript is currently housed at the Bibliothèque nationale de France (Gr. 95) at Paris.

== See also ==
- List of New Testament minuscules
- Biblical manuscript
- Textual criticism
