= Minuscule 11 =

Greek minuscule manuscript of the New Testament

- New Testament manuscript
- Text: Gospels
- Date: 14th-century
- Script: Greek
- Now at: National Library of France
- Size: 16.2 cm by 9.3 cm
- Type: Byzantine text-type
- Category: V
- Hand: neatly written

Minuscule 11 is a Greek minuscule manuscript of the New Testament in two small volumes, made of parchment. It is designated by the siglum 11 in the Gregory-Aland numbering of New Testament manuscripts, and ε 297 in the von Soden numbering of New Testament manuscripts. Using the study of comparative writing styles (palaeography), it has been assigned to the 14th-century.

== Description ==
The manuscript is a codex (precursor to the modern book format), containing the complete text of the four Gospels in two volumes. The first volume has 230 leaves, the second volume has 274 leaves (sized 16.2 cm by 9.3 cm). The text is written in one column per page, 16 lines per page, in "neat letters". It contains the Eusebian Canon tables placed before each Gospel, and portraits of the Evangelists.

The text is divided according to the chapters (known as κεφαλαια / kephalaia), whose numbers are given in the margin, and their titles (known as τιτλοι / titloi) written at the top of the pages. There is also a division according to the Ammonian Sections (233in Mark, the last in 16:7), whose numbers are placed at the margin, with references to the Eusebian Canons written below the Ammonian Section numbers.

== Text ==
The Greek text of the codex is considered to be a representative of the Byzantine text-type, but there are some Alexandrian readings. Biblical scholar Kurt Aland placed it in Category V of his New Testament manuscript classification system. Category V manuscripts are described as "manuscripts with a purely or predominantly Byzantine text." According to the Claremont Profile Method (a specific analysis of textual data), it represents textual family Π^{b} in Luke 1, and K^{x} in Luke 10 and Luke 20.

== History ==
The earliest history of the manuscript is unknown. It was in private hands, and belonged to the Archbishop of Reims Le Tellier (1671–1710), as were the codices Minuscule 10 and, 13. It was used by philologist and textual critic Ludolph Kuster in his edition of the Greek New Testament (as Paris 4).

The manuscript was examined by biblical scholar Johann M. A. Scholz. It was examined and described by scholar Paulin Martin. Biblical scholar Caspar René Gregory saw the manuscript in 1885.

The manuscript was dated by Gregory to the 12th century. The manuscript is currently dated by the INTF to the 14th century. It is presently housed at the National Library of France (shelf number Gr. 121.122) in Paris.

== See also ==
- Minuscule 12
- Minuscule 10
- List of New Testament minuscules
- Textual criticism
