= Lectionary 87 =

Lectionary ℓ 87
- New Testament manuscript
- Text: Evangelistarion
- Date: 14th-century
- Script: Greek
- Now at: Bibliothèque nationale de France
- Size: 25.2 cm by 19.5 cm

Lectionary 87, designated by siglum ℓ 87 (in the Gregory-Aland numbering), is a Greek manuscript of the New Testament, on parchment leaves. Palaeographically it has been assigned to the 14th-century.

== Description ==
The codex contains lessons from the Gospels of John, Matthew, Luke lectionary (Evangelistarium) with some lacunae. It is written in Greek minuscule letters, on 121 parchment leaves (25.2 cm by 19.5 cm). The writing stands in 2 columns per page, 27 lines per page. The Pericope Adulterae (John 8:3-11) is placed at the end, marked with obelus, and not pointed for any day.

== History ==
The manuscript once belonged to Colbert's (as were ℓ 88, ℓ 89, ℓ 90, ℓ 91, ℓ 99, ℓ 100, ℓ 101).

Scholz examined some parts of it. It was examined and described by Paulin Martin. C. R. Gregory saw it in 1885.

The manuscript is not cited in the critical editions of the Greek New Testament (UBS3).

Currently the codex is located in the Bibliothèque nationale de France (Gr. 313) in Paris.

== See also ==
- List of New Testament lectionaries
- Biblical manuscript
- Textual criticism

== Bibliography ==
- Jean-Pierre-Paul Martin, Description technique des manuscrits grecs, relatif au N. T., conservé dans les bibliothèques des Paris (Paris 1883), p. 158
