= Minuscule 373 =

- New Testament manuscript
- Text: Gospels
- Date: 15th century
- Script: Greek
- Now at: Vatican Library
- Size: 41.5 cm by 28 cm
- Type: Byzantine text-type
- Category: V
- Note: marginalia

Minuscule 373 (in the Gregory-Aland numbering),A^{500} (Soden), is a Greek minuscule manuscript of the New Testament, on paper. Palaeographically it has been assigned to the 15th century. It has marginalia.

== Description ==
The codex contains the text of the four Gospels on 221 paper leaves (41.5 cm by 28 cm) with lacunae at the end of John. The text is written in one column per page, in 46 lines with text of commentary. The biblical text is surrounded by a catena.

The text is divided according to the Ammonian Sections (in Mark 241 Sections, the last in 16:20), whose numbers are given at the margin, but without references to the Eusebian Canons.

It contains subscriptions at the end of each Gospel, and numbers of στιχοι.

== Text ==
The Greek text of the codex is a representative of the Byzantine text-type. Aland placed it in Category V.

According to the Claremont Profile Method it represents textual family K^{x} in Luke 1, Luke 10, and Luke 20. It creates pair with 301.

== History ==
The manuscript formerly belonged to Cardinal Sirleti (1514-1585), who became a librarian of the Vatican Library. It was added to the list of New Testament manuscripts by Scholz (1794–1852). C. R. Gregory saw it in 1886.

The manuscript is currently housed at the Vatican Library (Vat. gr. 1423) in Rome.

== See also ==
- List of New Testament minuscules
- Biblical manuscript
- Textual criticism
