= Lectionary 101 =

Greek manuscript of the New Testament

Lectionary ℓ 101
- New Testament manuscript
- Text: Evangelistarion
- Date: 14th-century
- Script: Greek
- Now at: Bibliothèque nationale de France
- Size: 27.8 cm by 19.8 cm

Lectionary 101, designated by siglum ℓ 101 (in the Gregory-Aland numbering), is a Greek manuscript of the New Testament, on parchment leaves. Palaeographically it has been assigned to the 14th-century. The manuscript has complex context.

== Description ==
The codex contains weekday lessons from the Gospels John, Matthew, and Luke lectionary (Evangelistarion) with some lacunae. The text is written in Greek minuscule letters, on 279 parchment leaves (27.8 cm by 19.8 cm), in 2 columns per page, 25 lines per page. It contains musical notes.

It contains the text of the Pericope Adulterae (John 8:3-11), it is dedicated to Pelagia.

== History ==
The manuscript once belonged to Colbert's (as were ℓ 87, ℓ 88, ℓ 89, ℓ 90, ℓ 91, ℓ 99, ℓ 100). It was added to the list of New Testament manuscripts by Scholz, who wrongly classified it as minuscule manuscript with the number 321. It was examined and described by Paulin Martin. C. R. Gregory saw it in 1885.

The manuscript is not cited in the critical editions of the Greek New Testament (UBS3).

Currently the codex is located in the Bibliothèque nationale de France (Gr. 303) in Paris.

== See also ==
- List of New Testament lectionaries
- Biblical manuscript
- Textual criticism
