= Minuscule 9 =

Greek minuscule manuscript of the New Testament

- New Testament manuscript
- Text: Gospels
- Date: 1167
- Script: Greek
- Now at: National Library of France
- Size: 23.5 cm by 17 cm
- Type: Byzantine text-type
- Category: V

Minuscule 9 is a Greek minuscule manuscript of the New Testament, made of parchment. It is designated by the siglum 9 in the Gregory-Aland numbering of New Testament manuscripts, and ε 279 in the von Soden numbering of New Testament manuscripts. According to the colophon it was written in 1167, which has been confirmed using the study of comparative writing styles (palaeography).

== Description ==
The manuscript is a codex (precursor to the modern book format), containing the complete text of the four Gospels, on 298 parchment leaves (sized 23.5 cm by 17 cm). The text is written in one column per page, 20 lines per page, with the text writing area measuring 16.4 by 11 cm. Biblical scholar Frederick H. A. Scrivener described the writing as "rather barbarous".

The text is divided according to the chapters (known as κεφαλαια / kephalaia), whose numbers are given in the margin, and their titles (known as τιτλοι / titloi) written at the top of the pages. There is also a division according to the Ammonian Sections (234 in Mark, the last in 16:8), whose numbers are given at the margin, but there are no references to the Eusebian Canons.

It contains the Epistle to Carpius and the Eusebian Canon tables at the beginning. Subscriptions are given at the end of each Gospel with the numbers of phrases (known as ρηματα / rhemata) and numbers of lines (known as στιχοι / stichoi). It also has liturgical books with hagiographies (a Synaxarion and a Menologion), and pictures.

== Text ==
The Greek text of the codex is considered to be a representative of the Byzantine text-type. Biblical scholar Hermann von Soden classified it to the textual family K^{x}. Biblical scholar Kurt Aland placed it in Category V of his New Testament manuscript classification system. Category V manuscripts are described as "manuscripts with a purely or predominantly Byzantine text."

According to the Claremont Profile Method (a specific anaylsis of textual data), it represents K^{x} in Luke 1 and Luke 20. In Luke 10 it has a mixed Byzantine text.

omit - 9 א A B K M S U Y Δ Θ Π Ψ Ω 047 0141 8. 565. 1192.
ὁ Ἰωαννής (John) - Majority of Manuscripts.

== History ==
According to the colophon, it was written ὡρα γ̅ της ἡμερας, πολευοντος ζ̅ ηλιου δι' ἔπων / The third hour of the day, during the seventh sun cycle as calculated. It was written when Manuel Porphyrogennetus was ruler of Constantinople, Amalric was King of Jerusalem, and during the reign of William II of Sicily.

The manuscript was used by scholar Robert Estienne in his Editio Regia of the Greek New Testament (1550), in which was designated by him as ιβ'. It was in private hands and belonged to French collector Peter Stella (about 1570). It became a part of the collection of philologist and palaeographer Ludolph Kuster (as Paris 3).

It was examined and described by scholars Bernard de Montfaucon, Johann J. Wettstein., and Paulin Martin. Scholz collated Matthew 1-8; Mark 1-4; and John 4-8. It was examined and described by biblical scholar Caspar René Gregory, who saw the manuscript in 1885. The manuscript is presently housed at the National Library of France (shelf number Gr. 83) in Paris.

== See also ==
- Minuscule 10
- Minuscule 8
- List of New Testament minuscules
- Textual criticism
- Textus Receptus
