= Codex Athous Dionysiou =

Uncial 045
- New Testament manuscript
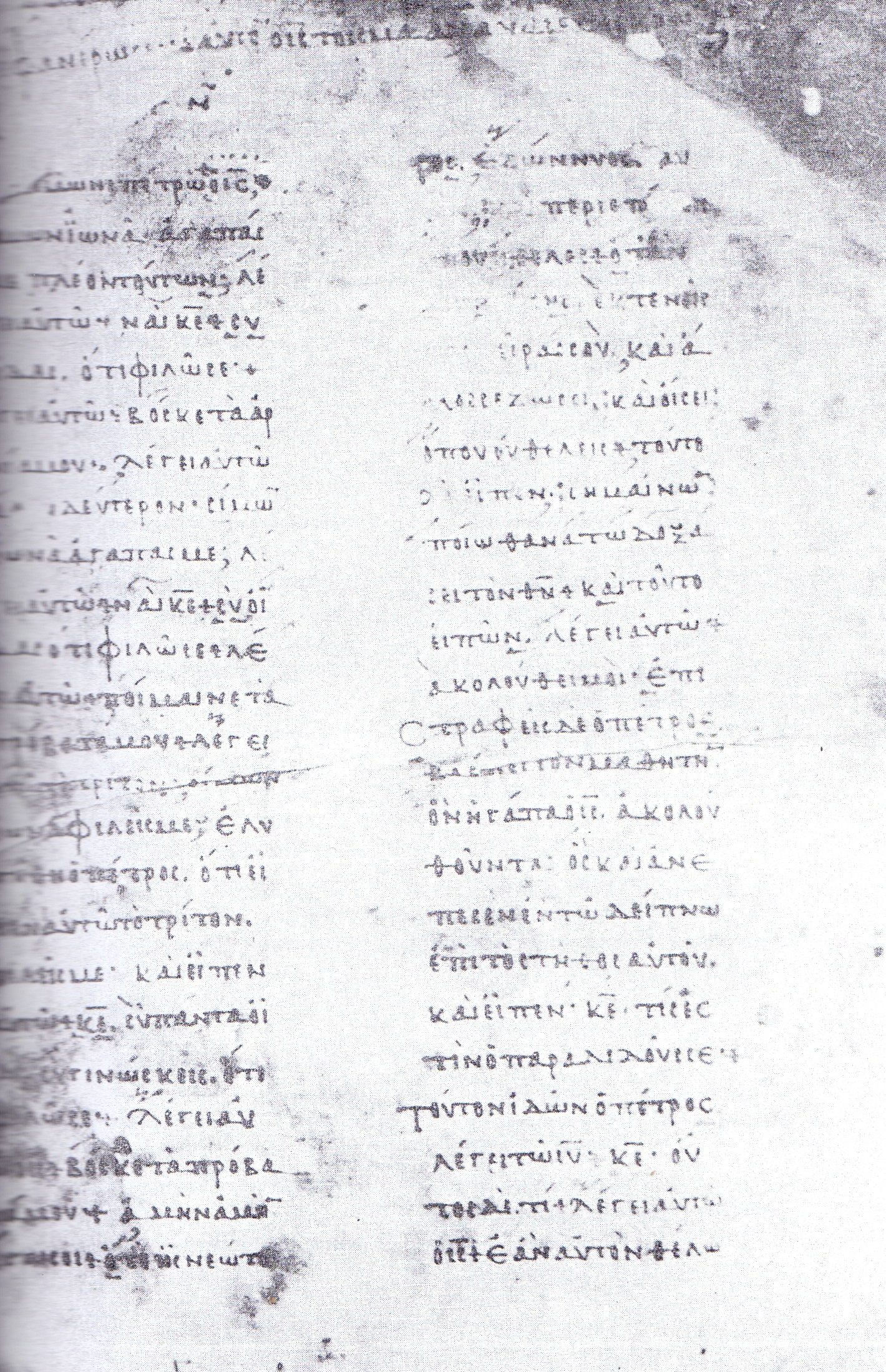
- Name: Athous Dionysiou
- Sign: Ω
- Text: Gospels
- Date: 9th century
- Script: Greek
- Now at: Dionysiou monastery
- Size: 22 x 16 cm
- Type: Byzantine text-type
- Category: V
- Note: close to codices E, U

Codex Athous Dionysiou, designated by Ω or 045 (in the Gregory-Aland numbering), ε 61 (von Soden), is a Greek uncial manuscript of the New Testament. The codex is dated palaeographically to the 9th century. It has marginalia.

== Description ==
The codex contains almost a complete text of the four Gospels on 259 thick parchment leaves (22 cm by 16 cm), with only one small lacuna in Gospel of Luke 1:15-28. The text is written in two columns per page, 19-22 lines per page, 13-15 letters per line. Ink is brown. The letters are large, with the first lines written in red ink. It has breathings and accents.

It contains lists of the κεφαλαια (tables of contents) before each Gospel, the τιτλοι at the top, the Ammonian Sections (in Mark 234 Sections), references to the Eusebian Canons, lectionary equipment in the margins, illustrations, liturgical books Synaxarion and Menologion, subscriptions at the end of each Gospel, and numbers of στιχοι (stichoi). It has errors of itacism, full of hiatus and another errors.

The texts of Matthew 10:37, Matthew 16:2b–3, Luke 22:43-44, John 5:3-4, and the Pericope Adulterae are marked by obeli in the margin. Matthew 21:20 was omitted but added to the margin by the original scribe.

== Text ==
The Greek text of this codex is a representative of the Byzantine text-type, with some Alexandrian readings. According to Hermann von Soden it is one of the three oldest manuscripts that present the earliest variety of the Byzantine text-type (after S and V). Soden included it to the textual family K^{1}. Kurt Aland placed it in Category V.

According to the Claremont Profile Method it represents the textual family K^{x} in Luke 1, Luke 10, and Luke 20. It forms a cluster with Minuscule 584.

In John 1:29 it lacks ο Ιωαννης along with manuscripts Sinaiticus, Alexandrinus, Vaticanus, Cyprius, Campianus, Petropolitanus Purpureus, Vaticanus 354, Nanianus, Macedoniensis, Sangallensis, Koridethi, Petropolitanus, Athous Lavrensis, 047, 0141, 8, 9, 565, 1192;

In John 5:25 it has "Son of Man" instead of "Son of God". Nazareth is transcribed in two ways as Ναζαρεθ (Alexandrian) and Ναζαρετ (Byzantine), Mose as Μωυσης (Alexandrian) and Μωσης (Byzantine). In John 1:28 it has the Alexandrian variant βηθανια (Bethany).

== History ==
It was collated by Mary W. Winslow, and edited by Kirsopp Lake and Silva New.

The codex is now located at the Dionysiou monastery (10) 55, on Mount Athos.

== See also ==
- List of New Testament uncials
- Textual criticism
