= Minuscule 299 =

- New Testament manuscript
- Text: Gospels
- Date: 10th century
- Script: Greek
- Now at: Bibliothèque nationale de France
- Size: 27.5 cm by 20.5 cm
- Type: mixed
- Category: none
- Note: marginalia

Minuscule 299 (in the Gregory-Aland numbering), A^{21} (Soden), is a Greek minuscule manuscript of the New Testament, on parchment. Palaeographically it has been assigned to the 10th century. It has marginalia.

== Description ==
The codex contains a complete text of the four Gospels on 328 parchment leaves (27.5 cm by 20.5 cm). The text is written in one column per page, in 24 lines per page.

The text is divided according to the κεφαλαια (chapters), whose numbers are given at the margin of the text, and their τιτλοι (titles of chapters) at the top of the pages. There is also another division according to the smaller Ammonian Sections (in Mark 240, 16:8), with references to the Eusebian Canons.

It contains the Epistula ad Carpianum, Prolegomena, the Eusebian tables, Synaxarion, Menologion, subscriptions at the end of each Gospel, and pictures. The biblical text is surrounded by a commentary (Mark – Victorinus).

== Text ==
The Greek text of the codex is a mixture of text-types. Kurt Aland did not place it in any Category.

It was not examined by using the Claremont Profile Method.

== History ==
It was added to the list of New Testament manuscripts by Scholz (1794–1852). It was examined and described by Paulin Martin. C. R. Gregory saw the manuscript in 1885.

The manuscript is currently housed at the Bibliothèque nationale de France (Gr. 177) at Paris.

== See also ==
- List of New Testament minuscules
- Biblical manuscript
- Textual criticism
