= Charles Maurice Le Tellier =

French Archbishop of Reims

His Grace Charles Maurice Le Tellier
- Archbishop of Reims
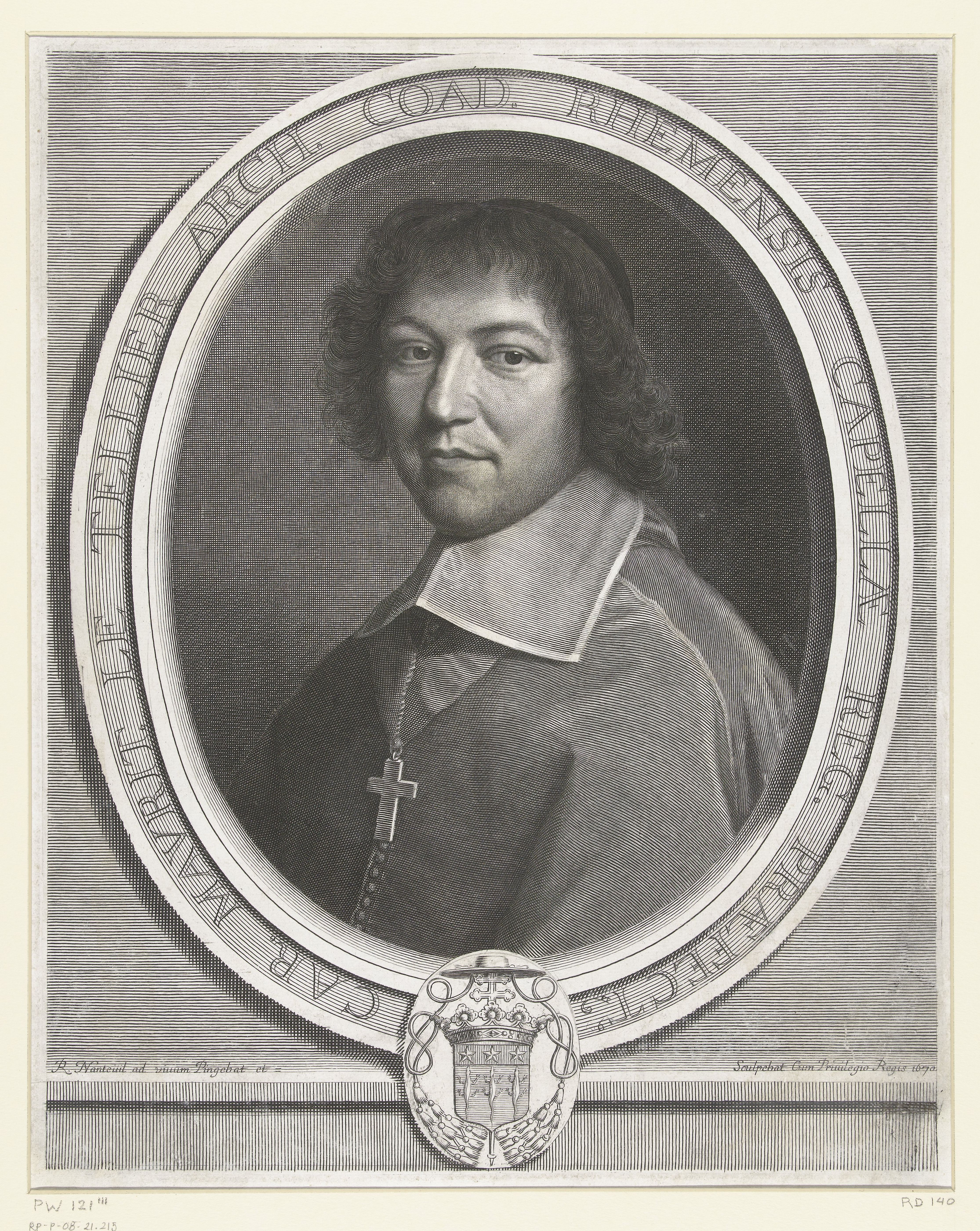
- Church: Roman Catholic
- Archdiocese: Reims
- See: Notre Dame de Reims
- Installed: 3 August 1671
- Term ended: 22 February 1710
- Predecessor: Antonio Barberini
- Successor: François de Mailly

Personal details
- Born: 18 July 1642 Turin, Duchy of Savoy
- Died: 22 February 1710 (aged 67) Reims, France
- Education: College of Sorbonne, Paris

Charles Maurice Le Tellier (1642 in Turin – 1710 in Reims) was a French Archbishop of Reims.

The son of Michel Le Tellier and brother of François-Michel le Tellier, Marquis de Louvois, both ministers of Louis XIV, he studied for the Church, won a doctorate of theology at the Sorbonne and was ordained priest in 1666. Provided, even before his ordination, with several royal abbeys, he rapidly rose to the coadjutorship of Langres, then to that of Reims and became titular of that see at the age of twenty-nine.

His administration was marked by zeal and success along the lines of popular education, training of clerics, parochial organization, restoration of ecclesiastical discipline and extirpation of Protestantism from the Sedan district. The importance of his see together with the royal favour brought him to the front in the affairs of the Church in France.

As secretary of the Petite Assemblée of 1681, he reported for the king and against the pope on all disputed points: the extension of the royal claim called régale, the forcible placing of a Cistercian abbess over the Augustinian nuns of Charonne, and the expulsion of the canonically elected vicars capitular of Pamiers.

The famous Gallican Assembly of 1682 was convened at his suggestion. Elected president with Harlay, he caused the bishops to endorse the royal policy of encroachment on church affairs, and even memorialized the pope with a view to make him accept the régale. His comparative moderation in the matter of the four Gallican propositions was due to Bossuet, who remarked that "the glory of the régale would only be obscured by those odious propositions."

As president of the Assembly (1700) which undertook to deal with Jansenism and Laxism already judged by the pope, Le Tellier was lenient with the Jansenists and severe with theologians of repute. The same holds true of the various controversies in which he took part: the Nouveau Testament de Mons, the theory of philosophical sin and Molinism.

Le Tellier is remembered as a successful administrator, an orator of some merit, a promoter of letters, a protector of Saint John Baptist de la Salle, Mabillon, Ruinart, etc., and a bosom friend of Bossuet, whom he consecrated, and visited on his deathbed, and whom he induced to write the "Oraison funèbre de Michel Le Tellier." His manuscripts, in sixty volumes, are at the Bibliothèque Nationale of Paris, and his library of 50,000 volumes at the Bibliothèque Sainte-Geneviève.

Le Tellier was also a manuscript collector (e.g. Minuscule 10, 11, 13, 284, and 467).
