= Uncial 0115 =

- New Testament manuscript
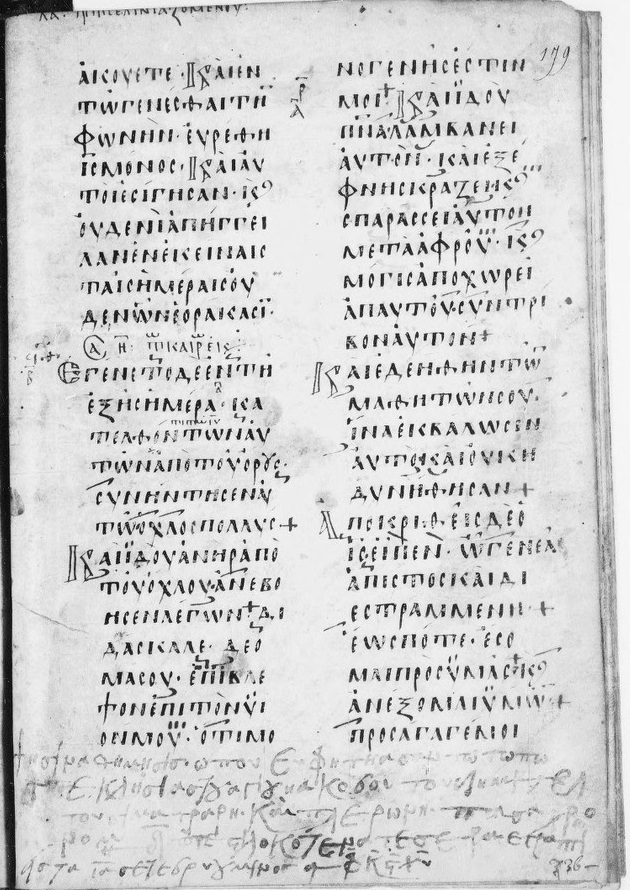
- Text: Gospel of Luke 9-10 †
- Date: 9th/10th-century
- Script: Greek
- Found: Scholz
- Now at: Bibliothèque nationale de France
- Size: 25 x 18 cm
- Type: mixed
- Category: III

Uncial 0115 (in the Gregory-Aland numbering), ε 57 (Soden); is a Greek uncial manuscript of the New Testament, dated paleographically to the 9th or 10th-century. Formerly it was labelled by W^{a}.

== Description ==
The codex contains 23 verses of the Gospel of Luke (9:35-47; 10:12-22), on two parchment leaves (25 cm by 18 cm). The text is written in two columns per page, 23 lines per page, in uncial letters.

It contains music notes in red; it has accents and breathings, but not always. All the stops are expressed by a single point, whose position makes no difference in its significance. The original codex contained the text of the four Gospels on 190 leaves.

The text is divided according to the κεφαλαια (chapters), whose numbers are given at the margin, and their τιτλοι (titles) at the top of the pages. There is also a division according to the Ammonian Sections, with references to the Eusebian Canons. It contains lectionary markings at the margin (for liturgical use).

The uncial letters are firmly written, delta and theta being of the ordinary oblong shape of that period.

Survived two leaves of the codex were included to the Lectionary 88.

== Text ==
The Greek text of this codex is a mixture of text-types. Aland placed it in Category III.

In Luke 10:12-22, the text of the manuscript 15 times differs from the Textus Receptus from the Elzevier edition.

It was not examined according to the Claremont Profile Method.

== History ==
Currently it is dated by the INTF to the 9th or 10th-century.

The codex was adapted to the Church use, but it is not a Lectionary. This fragment was brought to light by Scholz. It was at the end of another book. The text was published by Constantin von Tischendorf in Monumenta sacra inedita (1846).

The codex is currently located in the Bibliothèque nationale de France (Gr. 314, ff. 179, 180), in Paris.

== See also ==
- List of New Testament uncials
- Biblical manuscript
- Textual criticism
