= Dominikus von Brentano =

- Born: Dominik Anton Cajetan Brentano; 6 October 1740; Rapperswil
- Died: 2 June 1797 (aged 56); Gebrazhofen
- Education: Doctor of Theology
- Alma mater: Collegium Helveticum
- Occupation: Bible translator, writer
- Position held: chaplain

Dominik Anton Cajetan Brentano (October 6, 1740 – June 2, 1797) was a Swiss publicist, Enlightenment theologian, and Bible translator. From 1784 Brentano was the author of the Enlightenment newspaper Neueste Weltbegebenheiten.

== Life ==
He was born in Rapperswil on Lake Zurich, the twelfth child of the silk manufacturer and merchant Laurentius Brentano (1707–1746) and his wife Maria Francisca Rusconi, a native of Lucerne. After the early death of his father on August 26, 1746, an uncle took over the guardianship. Domenico Antonio Francesco Brentano (1703–1781) was a collegiate priest and episcopal commissioner of Chur. He lived in Schänis, barely 25 km from Rapperswil as a local pastor. His uncle provided an outstanding education and arranged a place for him to study at the traditional Collegium Helveticum in Milan, which he himself had attended. Here and at the affiliated Collegio di Brera, Dominikus completed his studies with a doctorate in theology and was ordained priest in 1763 by Giuseppe Pozzobonelli, the Archbishop of Milan.

Later, Dominic moved to another title in the House of Habsburg bishopric of Konstanz, as well as to the capital of the Habsburg Vorlande (also called Further Austria) in Freiburg im Breisgau for a longer period of time. Here he was elevated to the peerage by Empress Maria Theresa. In 1768 he became court chaplain and teacher of the sons of the Reichserbtruchsess of Count Ernst Jakob von Waldburg-Zeil-Wurzach at Wurzach Castle.

In 1772, the multilingual Dominic changed his professional position and became court chaplain and spiritual councilor of the Princely Abbey of Kempten as well as caretaker of the prince Abbey's court library. For almost twenty years he was the personal secretary of the prince abbot Honorius Roth von Schreckenstein (1760–1785) and his immediate successor Rupert II von Neuenstein (1785–1793).

In 1787, Dominikus von Brentano was a co-founder of the Masonic lodge Zur aufgehenden Sonne in Kempten. The declared aim of this lodge was to bring the Enlightenment to Kempten and to overcome the separation of the Catholic collegiate town of Kempten from the Protestant imperial town of Kempten.

After the unexpected death of Prince-Abbot Rupert II of Neuenstein on September 8, 1793, and the election of the previous Provost of Lautrach, Castolus Reichlin of Meldegg (1793–1803), as the last Prince-Abbot, an avowed opponent of enlightened thought (he ruled until the dissolution of the Principality of Kempten in 1803), he planned his departure from the court.

In accordance with family tradition, Dominikus took in his niece Marianne, the daughter of Franz Xaver Brentano, who died in 1775, and encouraged her education. As Marianne Ehrmann-Brentano, she became one of the first female writers. He also took in another nephew, Heinrich Franz Ernst Brentano (1768–1831), who had also lost his father at an early age, and supported his theological studies in Freiburg. For his ordination to the priesthood on December 18, 1790, Dominic gave him a theological textbook he had written himself.

In 1790–91 he began his main work, a translation of the Bible from the original languages into German. However, he was only able to complete this work for the New Testament; from the Old Testament he translated the Pentateuch, the Psalms, and the Proverbs, his work being continued by Anton Dereser. In the New Testament, Brentano initially relied on the Fulda Bible, the translation by the Jesuit Joseph Andreas Fleischütz published in 1778, until the middle of the Gospel of Matthew. From Matthew chapter 15 onward, Brentano translated directly from the Greek. This translation of the New Testament, supplemented by an explanatory paraphrase, appeared in Kempten in 1790. For the 1792 edition, Brentano made some corrections and now translated the first half of the Gospel of Matthew himself. He also made minor corrections for an edition of the New Testament that appeared only posthumously in 1798. An edition of the New Testament published in Vienna in 1808 without naming the author reverted to the text of Brentano's first edition of 1790, without the accompanying paraphrase.

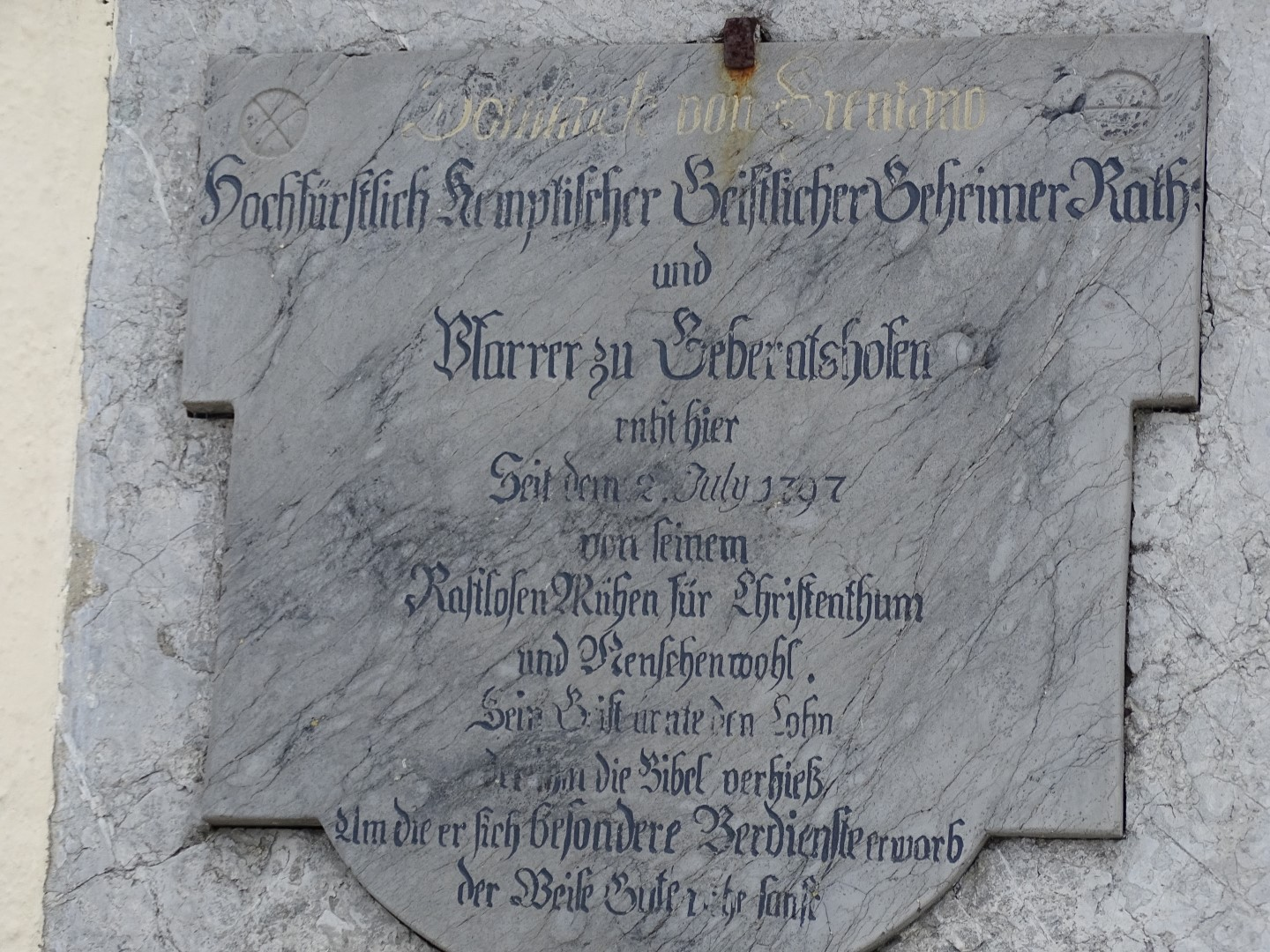
Memorial plaque at the church in Gebrazhofe

On May 10, 1797, a French army marched into Gebrazhofen and plundered and destroyed the small town. Dominikus von Brentano did not recover from these upsets and died in Gebrazhofen in the night of July 2 to 3, 1797. In his parish church a memorial plaque on the outside wall of the sacristy reminds of him.

== Works ==
- Von Brentano, Dominikus (1791). Die heilige Schrift des Neuen Testaments.

== Sources ==
- Bohlen, Reinhold, ed. (1997). Dominikus von Brentano 1740–1797. Paulinus Verlag Trier.
