= Pierre de L'Estoile =

French diarist and collector

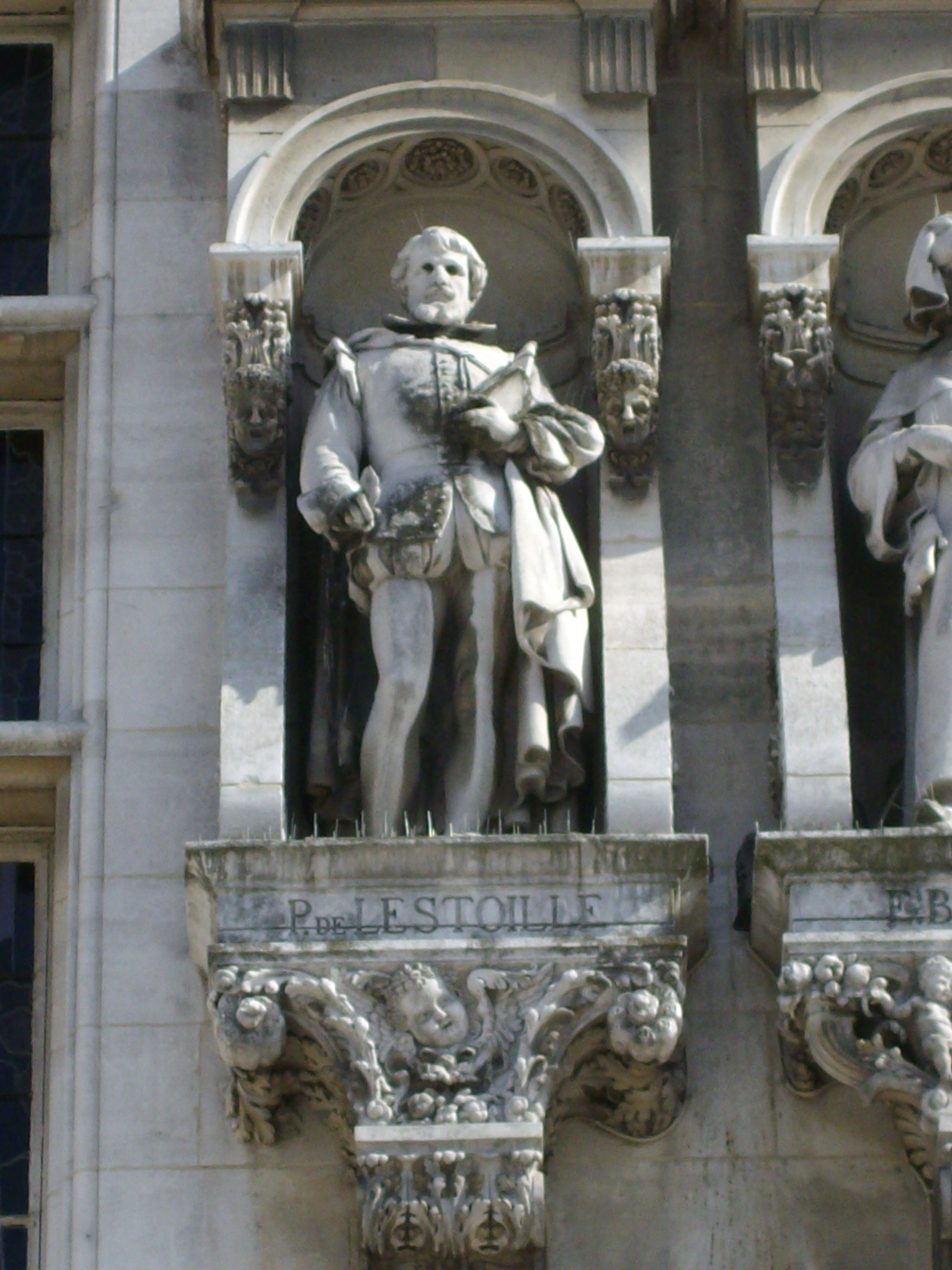
Statue of Pierre de l'Estoile on the façade of the Hôtel de Ville de Paris by Martial Adolphe Thabard, 19th century

Pierre de L'Estoile (1546 – 8 October 1611) was a French diarist and collector.

== Life ==
Born in Paris into a middle-class background, Pierre de l'Estoile was tutored by Mathieu Béroalde. He knew Agrippa d'Aubigné. He became a law student at Bourges (1565). He became a notary, and royal secretary.

He spent time in prison in 1589, being taken for one of the supporters of the politiques. He died in Paris in 1611.

== Works ==
The manuscript diaries of Pierre de L'Estoile (1546–1611) were deposited in the library of the Abbey of Saint-Acheul by his descendant Pierre Poussemthe de L'Estoile when he died in 1718. Pierre Poussemthe de L'Estoile was the abbot of Saint Acheul. The bookseller Pierre Mongie took possession of L'Estoile's manuscripts after the abbey was dissolved, and they were later acquired by the Royal library. The diaries were used as sources for various historical works on the period of Henry III and Henry IV of France.

The Registres Journaux (1574-1611) are personal accounts of the reigns of Henry III and Henry IV of France. They contain other matter (sonnets, pamphlets). (Note: His "exigence d'objectivité est sans cesse remise en cause par l'affirmation du je du témoin [...], puis du je du vieil homme amer et malade qui [...] s'abandonne au vain parler de soi." (Fanny Marin))

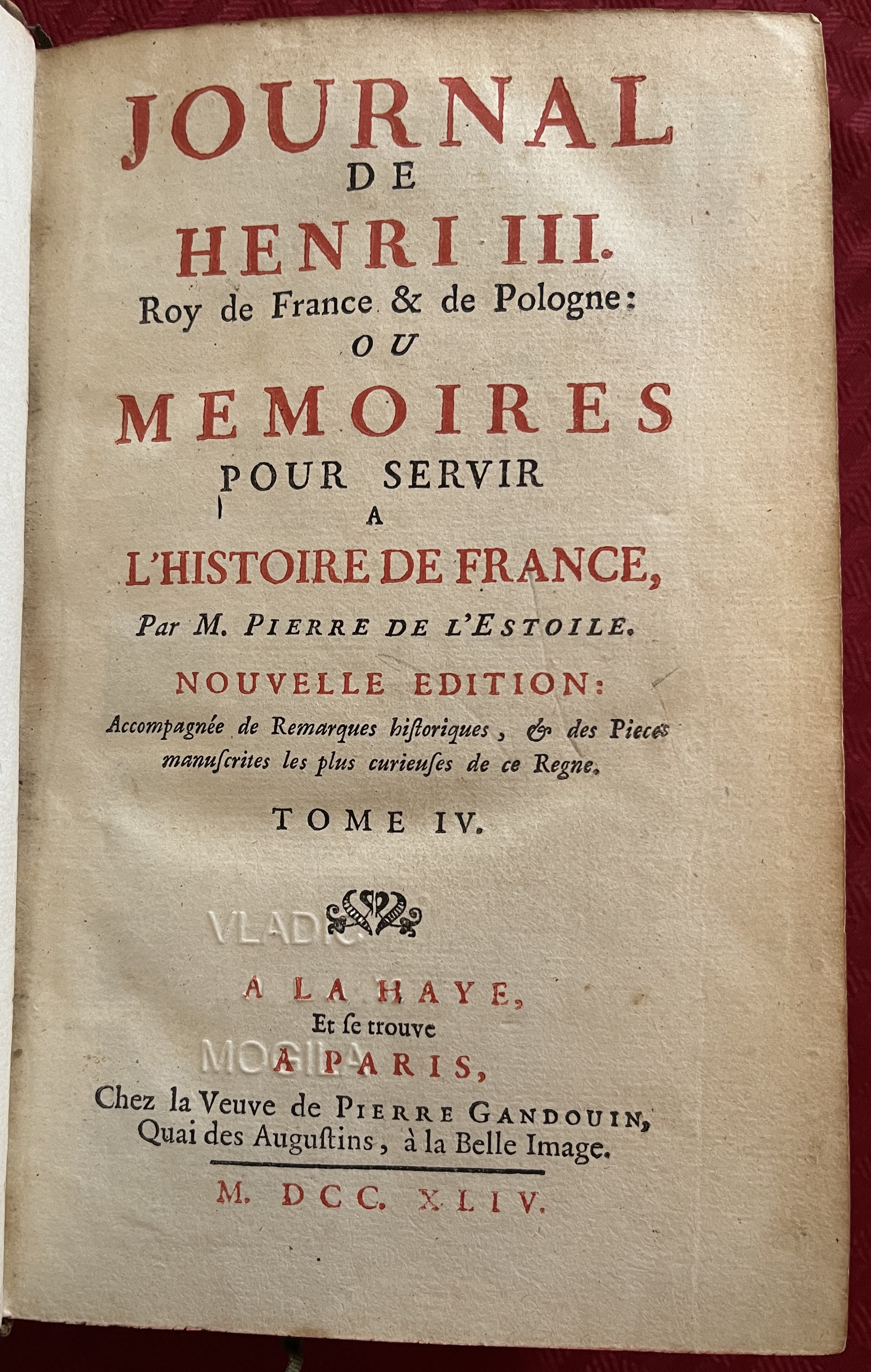
Journal de Henri III. Roy de France & Pologne: ou Memoires pour servir a l'Histoire de France, par M. Pierre de L'Estoile. MDCCXLIV

The Journals were not intended for publication. Material from them was edited and published as Journal de Henri III (1621 by Louis Servin; 1744 by Nicolas Lenglet Du Fresnoy); and the Journal de Henri IV (The Hague, 1741).

== Bibliography ==
- Registre-Journal du règne de Henri III, éd. M. Lazard et G. Schrenck, Genève, Droz, 1992
- M. Chopard, "En marge de la grande érudition, un amateur éclairé, Pierre de L'Estoile", Histoire et Littérature. Les écrivains et la politique, Paris, P.U.F., 1977
- G. Schrenck, "L'image du prince dans le Journal du règne de Henri III de P. de L'Estoile, ou l'enjeu d'une écriture", L'image du souverain dans les Lettres françaises, 1985, p. 15-25.
- F. Marin, "La fortune éditoriale des Registres journaux des règnes de Henri III et Henri IV de Pierre de L'Estoile", Nouvelle Revue du XVIe siècle, 20/2 - 2002, p. 87-108.

== See also ==
- Minuscule 9
- Minuscule 284

== Sources ==
- Chartier, Roger (2014-07-14), The Culture of Print: Power and the Uses of Print in Early Modern Europe, Princeton University Press, ISBN 978-1-4008-6033-3
- Hamilton, Tom (2017), Pierre de L'Estoile and His World in the Wars of Religion, Oxford University Press, ISBN 978-0-19-880009-5
