= Minuscule 284 =

- New Testament manuscript
- Text: Gospels
- Date: 13th century
- Script: Greek
- Now at: Bibliothèque nationale de France
- Size: 19.4 cm by 15 cm
- Type: Byzantine text-type
- Category: V
- Note: marginalia

Minuscule 284 (in the Gregory-Aland numbering), ε 374 (Soden), is a Greek minuscule manuscript of the New Testament, on parchment. Paleographically it has been assigned to the 13th century. It has marginalia.

== Description ==
The codex contains a complete text of the four Gospels on 254 parchment leaves (19.4 cm by 15 cm). The text is written in one column per page, in 22 lines per page. It is ornamented with silver.

The text is divided according to the κεφαλαια (chapters), whose numbers are given at the margin, and their τιτλοι (titles of chapters) at the top of the pages. There is also a division according to the Ammonian Sections (in Mark 234 - 16:9), whose numbers are given at the margin with references to the Eusebian Canons (written below Ammonian Section numbers).

It contains the Epistula ad Carpianum, Eusebian Canon tables, tables of the κεφαλαια (tables of contents) before each Gospel, lectionary markings at the margin, subscriptions at the end of each of the Gospels, and pictures. Liturgical books with a hagiographies Synaxarion and Menologion were added by a later hand.

== Text ==
The Greek text of the codex is a representative of the Byzantine text-type. Hermann von Soden included it to the textual family K^{x}. Aland placed it in Category V.

According to the Claremont Profile Method it represents K^{x} in Luke 1 and Luke 20. In Luke 10 no profile was made.

The pericope John 7:53-8:11 was added by a later hand.

== History ==
The manuscript once belonged to Le Teller, bishop of Rheims then to Peter Stella. It was added to the list of New Testament manuscripts by Scholz (1794-1852). It was examined and described by Paulin Martin. C. R. Gregory saw the manuscript in 1885.

The manuscript is currently housed at the Bibliothèque nationale de France (Gr. 93) at Paris.

== See also ==
- List of New Testament minuscules
- Biblical manuscript
- Textual criticism
