= Euthalian Apparatus =

Early Bibliical editorial material

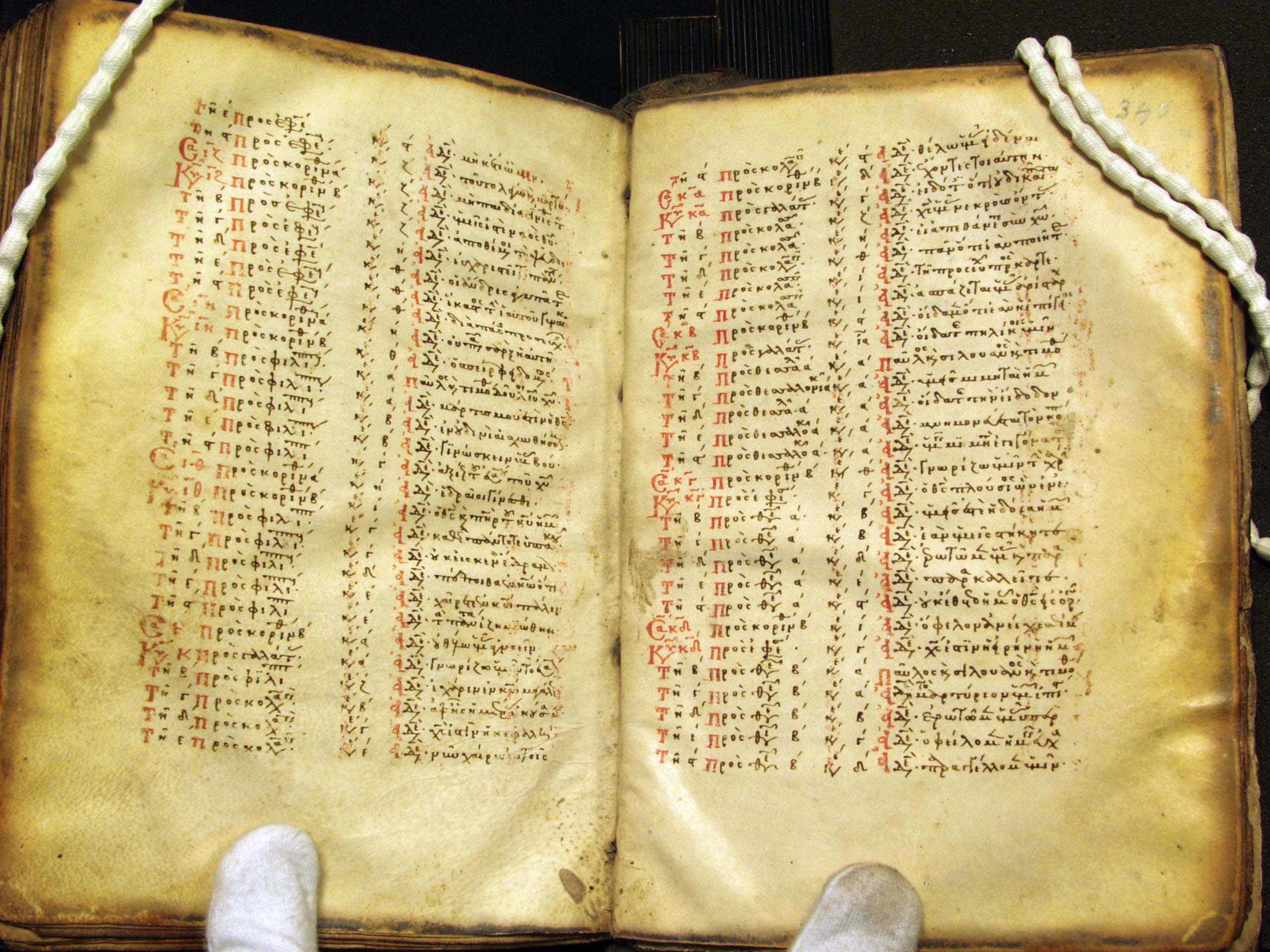
List of chapters in Minuscule 676 (Gregory-Åland) according to the Euthalian Apparatus

The Euthalian Apparatus is a collection of additional editorial material, such as divisions of text, lists, and summaries, to the New Testament's Book of Acts, Catholic epistles, and Pauline epistles. This additional material appears at the beginnings of books, in the margin of the text, and at the ends of books, as well as in line and paragraph separations. This material is traditionally associated with the name of Euthalius.

== Description ==
Euthalius divided the text of the Acts and catholic epistles into chapters, with a summary of contents at the top of each chapter. To Euthalius were also referred a division of the Acts into 16 αναγνωσεις (lessons) and of the Pauline epistles into 31 sections. But these lessons are quite different. Euthalius prepared also the text of the Acts and Epistles in which text is written stichometrically.

To the Euthalian Apparatus belong: a chronology of the Apostle Paul, the martyrdom of Paul, a list of places at which the Epistles were thought to be written, and the names associated with Paul in the headings to the Epistles. The quotations from the Old Testament cited in the Pauline epistles are numbered and catalogued in a list. Overall, the Apparatus is a collection of varied aids for the reader.

The Euthalian Apparatus is contained in numerous manuscripts: Codex Mutinensis, Codex Basilensis A. N. IV. 2, Codex Argenteus, Minuscule 3, 5, 6, 35, 38, and many other medieval manuscripts of the New Testament.

== Dating ==
The Euthalian apparatus has been dated variously to between the 4th and 7th centuries.

James Marchand gave the opinion that the Euthalian apparatus probably dated to the first half of the 4th century, arguing that the original must precede its incorporation into Gothic, Armenian, and Syriac translations.

The Greek texts do not include the Euthalian apparatus until relatively late, but Armenian and Syriac texts incorporated it by the late 5th or early 6th century, with Gothic texts including it by the early/mid 6th century. The Greek Codex Coislinianus includes it in the 6th century. Marchand argued that either Wulfila/Ulfilas had incorporated the Euthalian matter into the Gothic text in the mid 4th century, or that Sunnia and Frethela had done so in the early 5th century, with it being the more likely the work of Wulfila/Ulfilas.

== Authorship ==
The authorship usually is attributed to one Euthalius. He was identified as Bishop of Sulci in Sardinia, but according to Tregelles he was a Bishop of Sulca in Egypt. According to Wake and L. A. Zacagni Euthalius was a Bishop of Sulce, near Syene.

It was suggested that the name of the real author of the Apparatus was Evagrius. According to John Mill it was Theodore of Mopsuestia. Hermann von Soden thought, that Euthalius lived in the 7th century, possibly in Antioch.

Bruce M. Metzger stated: "How much of this supplementary material was drawn up by Euthalius and how much was added later is not known."
