= Anton Dereser =

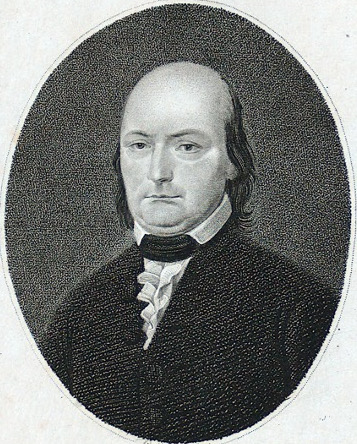
Thaddäus Anton Dereser

Anton Dereser (also known as Thaddaeus a Sancto Adamo, OCD) (3 February 1757, Fahr, Franconia –15 or 16 June 1827, Breslau) was a Discalced Carmelite professor of hermeneutics and Semitic languages.

Dereser was a Catholic representative of the Enlightenment, and promoted a rationalistic interpretation of the Bible. He had a marked tendency to take independent positions and defy authority—both secular and ecclesiastical—which involved him in numerous controversies and nearly cost him his life during the French Revolution.

As the Catholic Encyclopedia noted of him in 1913, "Dereser's combative character got him in trouble everywhere, and, though believing himself a good Catholic, he was imbued with a rationalistic, anti-Roman spirit", which made him "imbued with the shallow Rationalism of his time" and therefore "explaining away everything supernatural in Scripture and religion". This made all his writings "tainted" in the eyes of the Church authorities, though only one was placed on the Index Librorum Prohibitorum (see below) and that without the name of the author - testifying to the Church's appreciation of his talent, in spite of its dislike of his rationalism.

== Life ==
His Profession was in Cologne on 18 October 1777. He was ordained in 1780 at Mainz. During his studies of Philosophy and Theology at Würzburg and Heidelberg, where he graduated, he acquired such renown that contrary to the custom of his religious order he was allowed to accept a professorship in hermeneutics and semitic languages, first at his own alma mater, then at the Academy (University from 1786) of Bonn (1783–1791).

In 1791 he was sent to Strasbourg where he was a professor of Exegetical Theology and also filled the posts of preacher and of rector at the episcopal seminary. This embroiled him with the ongoing French Revolution. Dereser refused the Constitutional oath, making the clergy subordinate to the French civil authorities - an act which marked him out as a counter-revolutionary priest. During the Reign of Terror he was imprisoned and sentenced to death, but the capital punishment was commuted into one of deportation. It is not quite clear whether this was put into execution; but it is certain that with the fall of Robespierre he regained his liberty and returned with shattered health to the convent in Heidelberg (1796).

In 1799 he became professor of Semitic languages, exegesis and pastoral theology in Heidelberg. The Margrave of Baden withholding his consent to Dereser's acceptance of the office of coadjutor to the Bishop of Strasbourg, Dereser was transferred with the whole university to Freiburg (1807), but having given offence by a funeral sermon (1810) had to leave suddenly to Karlsruhe where he was a pastor, and then to Constance.

Thence he went to Lucerne where from 1811 to 1814 he was Rector of the Episcopal Seminary, but was expelled on account of his rationalistic teaching, which involved explaining away everything supernatural in Scripture and religion. He turned, on invitation, to Breslau as canon and professor of Dogmatic Theology (1815). There he spent the rest of his life.

== Works ==
- One of his works, Commentario biblica in . . . Tu es Petrus (Bonn, 1789) was placed on the Index Librorum Prohibitorum.
- His principal work was the translation of the Old Testament from Hebrew to German, completing the work of Dominic von Brentano who had translated the New Testament and the Pentateuch. The German Bible translation of Brentano and Dereser (Frankfurt, 1815–1828, 16 vols.) was revised by Johann Martin Augustin Scholz (1828–1837, 17 vols.).
- Other works, chiefly Latin, included
  - on the Necessity of the Knowledge of Oriental Languages for the Study of Scripture (Cologne, 1783);
  - Hermeneutics of the Old and New Testament (1784 and 1786);
  - Dissertations on the Destruction of Sodom (1784);
  - on Saint John the Baptist (1785);
  - on The Power and Duties of the Pope according to St. Bernard (1787);
  - on A number of books and portions of the Old Testament with translations (partly metrical) and annotations;
  - on the Temptation of Christ (1789);
  - on His Divinity and on Pharisaism (Strasbourg, 1791);
  - on the Foundation of the University of Bonn (1786);
  - a German Breviary (Augsburg, 1793, several times reprinted)
  - a German Prayer Book (Rottenburg, 1808).
- Dereser also edited A. Frenzel's Treatise on Matrimony (Breslau, 1818), which argues against the doctrine that marriages should be indissoluble; the author later retracted it.

== See also ==
- Bible translations into German
- Johann Martin Augustin Scholz
