= Ludolph Küster =

Ludolf Küster (German: Ludolph Küster) (1670–1716) was a Westphalian scholar, philologist, textual critic, palaeographer, and editor of Greek ancient texts.

Küster was born in Blomberg, Westphalia. He was friends with, and a correspondent of, Richard Bentley, master of Trinity College, Cambridge, who assisted him in the production of a hasty edition of the works of Aristophanes. Thomas de Quincey was later to say that Bentley's contributions—including epistles on The Clouds and Plutus—were "mangled" by Küster and incompetent printers. Some of these letters still survive. Bentley also assisted Küster, among other editors, with an edition of the Suda (1705).

In Utrecht, from 1697 to 1699, Küster published the journal Bibliotheca Librorum novorum under the pseudonym "Neocorus" (neokoros is aa Greek word that translates as roughly equivalent to the German word "Küster", that is, "sexton" or "sacristan"). Several times, Küster came into professional conflict with Dutch classical scholar Jakob Gronovius.

In 1710, he made a reprint, or rather revision, of John Mill's Novum Testamentum Graecum (1707), with prolegomena and with collations of 12 more manuscripts. It was published in Amsterdam and Rotterdam. Kuster's reprint also appeared, in Leipzig in 1723 and again in Amsterdam in 1746. He used 12 more manuscripts than Mill's original edition. Nine of these 12 codices were collated for Küster by the abbé de Louvois: codex 285, M, 9, 11, 119, 13, 14, 15, and Codex Ephraemi. Currently they are housed in the Bibliothèque nationale de France in Paris. Codex 78 was collated by Boerner, codex 42, and Codex Boernerianus by Küster himself. In this edition, Küster published his own notes separate from Mill's by prefixing and affixing the marks, and his collations both of his own codices and of early editions will be found more complete than his predecessor's. Mill's dedication was omitted.

Küster was the first to recognize the 9th century date of Codex Boernerianus.

In 1713, Küster traveled to Paris and spoke against the Protestant religion. There he was admitted to the Academy of Inscriptions and Belles Lettres, and received a pension from the crown of 2000 pounds.

He is mentioned by name in Alexander Pope's satirical Dunciad, in the company of other notable classicists of his day.

== Selected works ==
- Historia critica Homeri. Frankfurt: Schrey and Meyer. 1696.
- Suidae Lexicon, Graece & Latine. Cambridge: Cambridge University Press. 1705.: vol. 1, vol. 2, vol. 3.
- Iamblichi Chalcidensis, ex Coele-Syria, De vita Pythagorica liber, Graece & Latine. Amsterdam: Petzold. 1707. (Also includes a life of Pythagoras by Porpyhrius, and another anonymous life preserved in a summary in the Bibliotheca of Photius.)
- Aristophanis comoediae undecim, Graece et Latine, ex codd. mss. emendatae. Amsterdam: Thomas Fritsch. 1710.
- Novum Testamentum Graecum, cum lectionibus variantibus MSS. exemplarium, versionum, editionum, SS. patrum et scriptorum ecclesiasticorum. Rotterdam: C. Fritsch and M. Böhm. 1710.
- An edition of Hesychius
- De vero usu verborum mediorum apud Graecos. Paris: Delespine. 1714.
