= Lectionary 204 =

Lectionary ℓ 204
- New Testament manuscript
- Text: Evangelistarium
- Date: 11th century
- Script: Greek
- Now at: Bodleian Library
- Size: 23 cm by 17.5 cm
- Hand: beautiful copy

Lectionary 204, designated by siglum ℓ 204 (in the Gregory-Aland numbering) is a Greek manuscript of the New Testament, on parchment. Palaeographically it has been assigned to the 11th century. Scrivener labelled it by 212^{evl}. The manuscript has complex context.

== Description ==
The codex contains lessons from the Gospels of John, Matthew, Luke lectionary (Evangelistarium), on 305 parchment leaves (23 cm by 17.5 cm). The text is written in Greek minuscule letters, in one column per page, 10 lines per page. It contains musical notes. According to Scrivener it is "a very beautiful copy".

There are daily lessons from Easter to Pentecost.

== History ==
Scrivener and Gregory dated it to the 11th century. It has been assigned by the Institute for New Testament Textual Research to the 11th century.

The manuscript was added to the list of New Testament manuscripts by Scrivener (number 212) and Gregory (number 204). Gregory saw it in 1883.

The manuscript is not cited in the critical editions of the Greek New Testament (UBS3).

The codex is located in the Bodleian Library (Rawl. G. 2) at Oxford.

== See also ==
- List of New Testament lectionaries
- Biblical manuscript
- Textual criticism

== Bibliography ==
- Gregory, Caspar René (1900). Textkritik des Neuen Testaments, Vol. 1. Leipzig. p. 404.
