= Minuscule 314 =

- New Testament manuscript
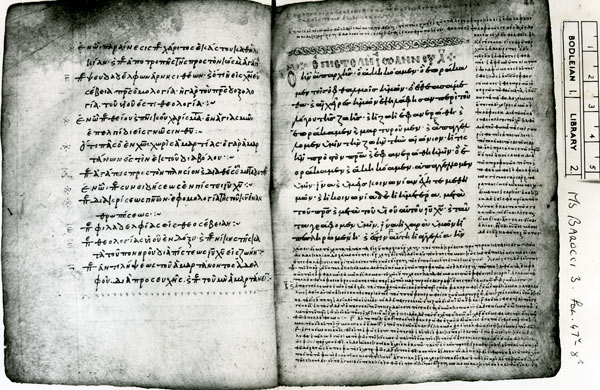
- Folios 47 verso – 48 recto
- Text: Acts, Paul, Rev. †
- Date: 11th century
- Script: Greek
- Now at: Bodleian Library
- Size: 13 cm by 10 cm
- Type: Byzantine text-type
- Category: V
- Hand: beautifully written

Minuscule 314 (in the Gregory-Aland numbering), O^{11} (Soden), is a Greek minuscule manuscript of the New Testament, on parchment. Palaeographically it has been assigned to the 11th century. Formerly it was labelled by 23^{a}, 28^{p}, and ^{6r}.

== Description ==
The codex contains the text of the Acts of the Apostles, Catholic epistles, Pauline epistles, and Book of Revelation on 299 parchment leaves (13 cm by 10 cm) with numerous lacunae. The text is written in one column per page, biblical text in 22 lines per page, text of commentary in 57-66 lines per page. According to Scrivener it is "a beautiful little book".

Lacunae

Acts 1:1-3:10; 3:10-11:13; 14:9-26; 17:6-19; 20:28-24:12 1 Peter 2:2-16; 3:7-21; 2 Corinthians 9:14-11:9; Gal 1:1-18; Ephesians 6:1-19; Philippians 4:7-23; Rev 1:10-17; 9:11-17; 17:10-18:8; 20:1-22:21.

Acts 1:1-3:10 was supplied in the 14th century. It contains lists of the κεφαλαια (tables of contents) before each sacred book, Euthalian Apparatus, Prolegomena, and scholia on the Epistles.

== Text ==
The Greek text of the codex is a representative of the Byzantine text-type. Aland placed it in Category V.

== History ==
The manuscript was written in Ephesus. It was examined by Richard Bentley (χ'), John Mill (Baroc.), Caspar, Johann Jakob Wettstein, Johann Jakob Griesbach (only 1 Cor. 15), and Bloomfield. C. R. Gregory saw it in 1883. Formerly it was labelled by 23^{a}, 28^{p}, and ^{6r}. In 1908 Gregory gave number 314 for it.

A full Commentary on the Apocalypse, was edited by J. A. Cramer in 1840.

The manuscript is currently housed at the Bodleian Library (MS. Barocci 3) at Oxford.

== See also ==
- List of New Testament minuscules
- Biblical manuscript
- Textual criticism
