= Minuscule 203 =

- New Testament manuscript
- Text: New Testament (except Gospels)
- Date: 12th century
- Script: modern Greek
- Now at: British Library
- Size: 21.5 cm by 29.5 cm
- Type: Byzantine text-type
- Category: V

Minuscule 203 (in the Gregory-Aland numbering), α 203 (Soden), is a modern Greek minuscule manuscript of the New Testament, on parchment. Paleographically it has been assigned to the 12th century.

== Description ==
The codex contains the text of the New Testament (except Gospels) on 149 parchment leaves (size 21.5 cm by 29.5 cm), with some lacunae. The order of books: Pauline epistles, Acts of the Apostles, Catholic epistles, and Apocalypse. It contains non-biblical material at the end with a list of the errors condemned by the Seven Ecumenical Councils.

It is written in one column per page, in 32-33 lines per page.

It has Euthalian Apparatus.

== Text ==
The Greek text of the codex is a representative of the Byzantine text-type. Aland placed it in Category V.

== History ==
The scribe of the codex was named Andreas.

It was examined by Birch and Scholz. C. R. Gregory saw it in 1886.

It is currently housed at the British Library (Add MS 28816), in London.

== See also ==
- List of New Testament minuscules
- Biblical manuscript
- Textual criticism
