= John Mill (theologian) =

English theologian

- Born: 1645; Shap, Westmorland, England
- Died: 23 June, 1707 (aged 61–62); England
- Occupation(s): Theologian, writer

John Mill (c. 1645 – 23 June 1707) was an English theologian noted for his critical edition of the Greek New Testament which included notes on over thirty-thousand variant readings in the manuscripts of the New Testament.

== Biography ==
Mill was born circa 1645 at Shap in Westmorland, entered Queen's College, Oxford, as a servitor in 1661, and took his master's degree in 1669 in which year he spoke the "Oratio Panegyrica" at the opening of the Sheldonian Theatre. Soon afterwards he became a Fellow of Queen's. In 1676, he became chaplain to the bishop of Oxford, and, in 1681, he obtained the rectory of Bletchington, Oxfordshire, and was made chaplain to Charles II. From 1685 till his death, he was principal of St Edmund Hall, Oxford; and in 1704 he was nominated by Queen Anne to a prebendal stall in Canterbury. He died a fortnight after the publication of his Greek Testament.

== Textual critic ==
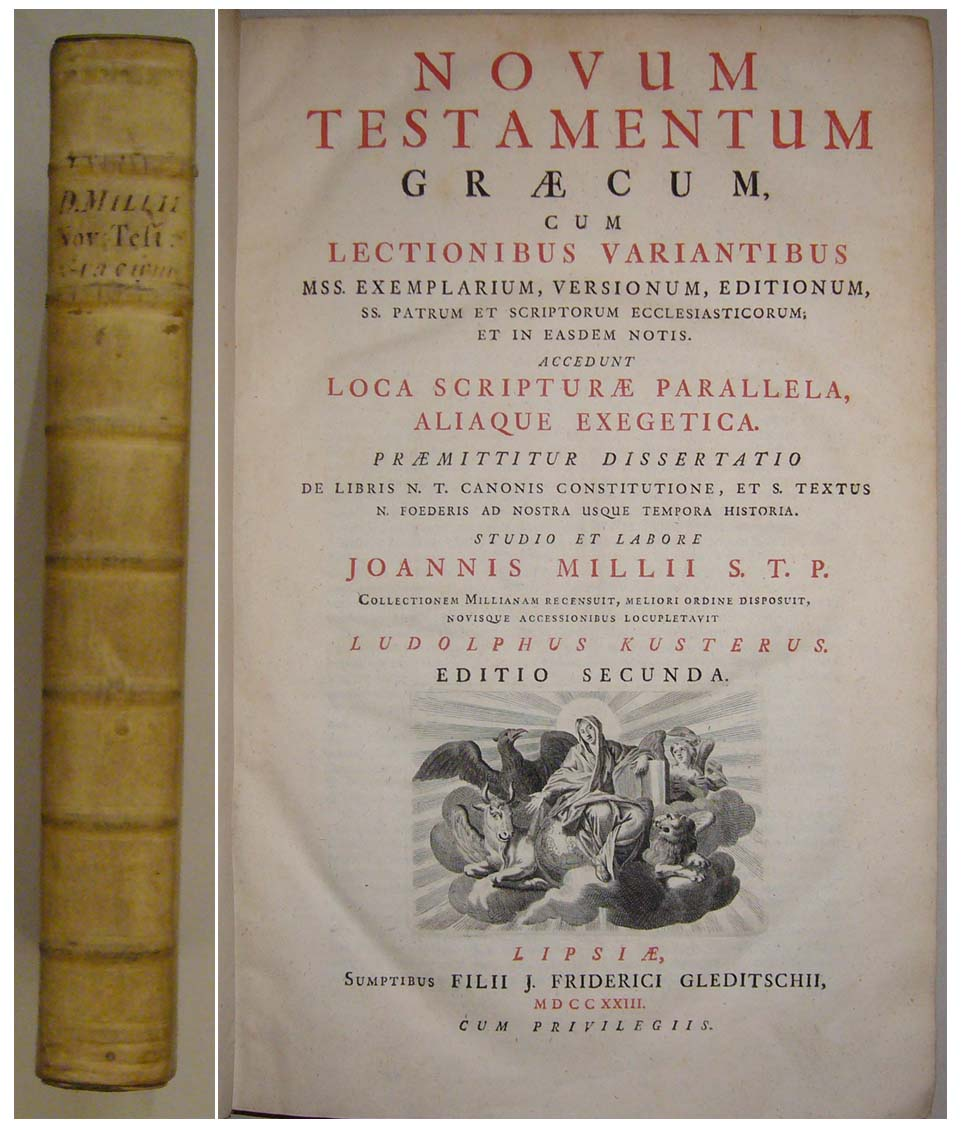
Novum testamentum græcum

Mill's Novum testamentum græcum, cum lectionibus variantibus MSS. exemplarium, versionum, editionum SS. patrum et scriptorum ecclesiasticorum, et in easdem nolis (Oxford, fol. 1707) was undertaken with the encouragement of John Fell, his predecessor in the field of New Testament criticism; it took thirty years to complete and was a great advance on previous scholarship. The text is that of Robertus Stephanus (1550), but the notes, besides including all previously existing collections of various readings, add a vast number derived from his examination of many new manuscripts, and Oriental versions (the latter of which he used only in the Latin translations).

Although the amount of information given by Mill is small compared with that in modern editions, it is probable that no one, except perhaps Tischendorf, has added so much material for the work of textual criticism. He was the first to notice the value of the concurrence of the Latin evidence with the Codex Alexandrinus, the only representative of an ancient non-Western Greek text then sufficiently known; this hint was not lost on Bentley.

Mill's work noted over 30,000 discrepancies between some 100 extant New Testament manuscripts. His work was attacked by Daniel Whitby and Anthony Collins. Whitby's Examen claimed that Mill had destroyed the validity of the text. Collins received a reply from Bentley (Phileleutherus lipsiensis) defending Mill, noting essentially that Mill was not responsible for the differences between the various manuscripts, he only pointed them out. Bentley further noted that Christendom had indeed survived despite the errors, essentially asserting that Whitby's attacks were unfounded.

== Works ==
- John Mill, Novum Testamentum Graecum, cum lectionibus variantibus MSS (Oxford 1707). In 1710 Ludolf Küster reprinted Mill's Testament at Amsterdam with the readings of twelve additional manuscripts. This is available from the Bayerische Staatsbibliothek here: Novum Testamentum Graecum, cum lectionibus variantibus MSS
