= Jean Hurault de Boistaillé =

French nobleman and government official

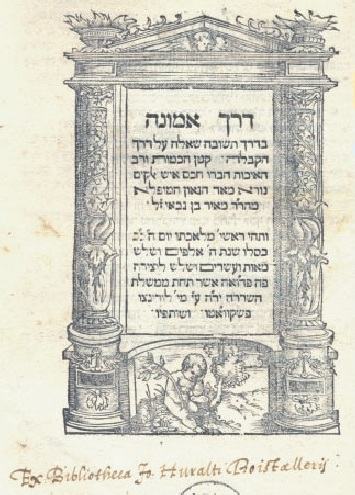
Derek Emunah with inscription of the owner

Jean Hurault de Boistaillé (1517–1572) was a French nobleman and government official. In 1558 he was an emissary of the king Henry II, then ambassador of France in Constantinople and Venice (1562–1564). He played an important role in getting military support from the Ottoman Empire in the Italian War of 1551–1559. He was a bibliophile and collector of manuscripts and incunabula. He died in England in 1572 during his diplomatic mission.

Hurault used his appointment at the embassy to collect books and manuscripts. He used several agents who collected the books and manuscripts on his assignment. Zacharias Scordylis from Crete was one of them. Several book traders, such as Andreas Dramarius and Nicola della Torre, were also supplying manuscripts to Hurault and he used services of the Roman booksellers Vincenzo Lucchino and Camilius Venetus.

On behalf of Hurault several agents bought some manuscripts from private collections and libraries, among them books from the library of Cardinal Domenico Grimani.

He collected mainly Greek manuscripts, but also Arabic and Hebrew. The number of Greek manuscripts was 245. He possessed a 13th-century manuscript of the Quran and a Horologion of the Melkite, the earliest book printed from movable type in Arabic, which was produced in Fano, Italy, in 1514 at a press subsidized by Pope Julius II. To his collection belonged a Hebrew manuscript of the Pentateuch from 1330 and a manuscript of the Jerusalem Talmud.

After his death the library came into the possession of his brother André Hurault de Maisse, who was also a book collector. Later the library came into the possession of his cousin, Philippe Hurault de Cheverny, bishop of Chartres, son of Philippe Hurault de Cheverny. After the Bishop's death the collection of 409 manuscripts was sold to King Louis XIII for the sum of 12 000 francs. Louis XIII deposited them in the royal library, which was nationalized at the Revolution as the Bibliothèque nationale de France.

Some of Huralt’s manuscripts are housed now at the University of Leiden; one manuscript is housed in Bern (Burgerbibliothek Bern, ms. 360).
