= Johann Jakob Wettstein =

Swiss theologian (1693–1754)

Johann Jakob Wettstein (also Wetstein; 5 March 1693 – 23 March 1754) was a Swiss theologian, best known as a New Testament critic.

== Biography ==
=== Youth and study ===
Johann Jakob Wettstein was born in Basel. Among his tutors in theology was Samuel Werenfels (1657–1740), an influential anticipator of modern critical exegesis. While still a student, Wettstein began to direct his attention to the special pursuit of his life, the text of the Greek New Testament. A relative, Johann Wettstein, who was the university librarian, gave him permission to examine and collate the principal manuscripts of the New Testament in the library, and he copied the various readings which they contained into his copy of Gerard of Maastricht's edition of the Greek text.

In 1713 in his public examination he defended a dissertation entitled De variis Novi Testamenti lectionibus, and sought to show that variety of readings did not detract from the authority of the Bible. Wettstein paid great attention also to Aramaic and Talmudic Hebrew. In the spring of 1714 he undertook an academic tour, which led him to Paris and England, the great object of his inquiry everywhere being to examine manuscripts of the New Testament. In 1716 he made the acquaintance of Richard Bentley at the University of Cambridge; Bentley took great interest in his work and persuaded him to return to Paris to collate carefully the Codex Ephraemi, Bentley having then in view a critical edition of the New Testament.

=== Basel ===
In July 1717 Wettstein returned to take the office of a deacon at large (diaconus communis) at Basel, a post which he held for three years, after which he became his father's colleague and successor in the parish of St Leonard's. At the same time he pursued his favourite study, and gave private lectures on New Testament exegesis. It was then that he decided to prepare a critical edition of the Textus Receptus (Greek New Testament). He had in the meantime broken with Bentley, whose famous Proposals appeared in 1720, based upon methodological issues.

Doubts had been swirling about Wettstein's orthodoxy as early as the publication of his thesis in 1713, and he ultimately fell under suspicion of Socinianism when he was unwilling to defend the orthodox doctrine of the Trinity. In 1728 his one-time friend and mentor Johann Ludwig Frey accused Wettstein of using textual criticism as a means of advancing Socinian theology, which was investigated by a committee of clergy at Basel. The charge was formally upheld and he was ultimately dismissed, in 1730, from his position at St. Leonhard's.

=== Amsterdam ===
He then moved from Basel to Amsterdam, where another relative, Johann Heinrich Wettstein (1649–1726), had an important printing and publishing business. Here editions of the classics were being published, as well as Gerard of Maastricht's edition of the Greek Testament. Wettstein had begun to print an edition of the Greek Testament, but this was suddenly stopped for some unknown reason. As soon as he reached Amsterdam, in 1730, he published anonymously the Prolegomena ad Novi Testamenti Graeci editionem, which he had proposed should accompany his Greek Testament, and which was later republished by him, with additions, in 1751. The next year (1731) the Remonstrants offered him the chair of philosophy in their college at Amsterdam, vacated by the illness of Jean Leclerc, on condition that he clear himself of the suspicion of heresy. He returned to Basel, and received a reversal (22 March 1732) of the previous decision, and re-admission to all his clerical offices. But, on his becoming a candidate for the Hebrew chair at Basel, his orthodox opponents blocked his appointment, and he retired to Amsterdam.

At length, he was allowed to instruct the Remonstrant students in philosophy and Hebrew on certain humiliating conditions. For the rest of his life he continued as professor in the Remonstrant college, declining in 1745 the Greek chair at Basel. In 1746 he once more visited England, and collated Syriac manuscripts for his final, great work. At last this appeared in 1751–1752, in two folio volumes, under the title Novum Testamentum Graecum editionis receptae cum lectionibus variantibus codicum manuscripts, etc. He did not venture to put new readings in the body of his page, but consigned them to a place between the Textus Receptus and the full list of various readings. Beneath the latter he gave a commentary, consisting principally of a mass of valuable illustrations and parallels drawn from classical and rabbinical literature, which has formed a storehouse for all later commentators. In his Prolegomena he gave an admirable methodical account of the manuscripts, the versions and the readings of the fathers, as well as the troubled story of the difficulties with which he had had to contend in the prosecution of the work of his life. He was the first to designate uncial manuscripts by Roman capitals, and cursive manuscripts by Arabic figures. He did not long survive the completion of this work. He died in Amsterdam.

=== Work ===
Wettstein rendered service to textual criticism by his collection of various readings and his methodical account of the manuscripts and other sources.

Through his laborious study of Codex Alexandrinus, he found misinterpretations or calculated mistakes of New Testament written in Greek. He came under particular fire for disputing the passage of 1 Timothy 3:16, believing the original reading to be "which was manifest in the flesh," rather than "God was manifest in the flesh." Through his studies he developed an increasingly critical attitude on textual matters and their relationship to doctrinal issues. Yet during the latter years of his life, he adopted the position that the oldest extant Greek manuscripts had been corrupted by influence of the Latin, resulting in his loss of confidence in those ancient copies, including Alexandrinus. Between 1751 and 1752 his Prolegomena and Novum Testamentum Graecum was published. Its base text was the 1624 version of the Elzevir Textus Receptus, with minor changes, with his preferred reading noted in the apparatus.

Some opponents considered his work to be less valuable because of his prejudice against the Latin version and the principle of grouping manuscripts in families, which had been recommended by Richard Bentley and J. A. Bengel.

Wettstein gives an account of his labours and trials in his Nov. Test. i.: 1751. Novum Testamentum Græcum editionis receptæ, cum Lectionibus Variantibus Codicum MSS., Editionum aliarum, Versionum et Patrum, necnon Commentario pleniore ex Scriptoribus veteribus, Hebræis, Græcis, et Latinis, historiam et vim verborum illustrante, in two volumes. Amsterdam: Amstelædami. Reprinted in 1962 by Graz, Austria: Akademische Druck-u. Verlagsanstalt.

== Works ==
- Wettstein, J. J.; Wetstein, Rudolph; Wetstein, Jacobus (1730). Prolegomena ad Novi Testamenti Graeci editionem accuratissimam, e vetustissimis codd. mss. denuo procurandam. Amstelaedami: apud R. & J. Wetstenios & G. Smith.
- ——— (1751). Novum Testamentum Graecum editionis receptae cum lectionibus variantibus codicum manuscriptis. Amsterdam: Ex Officina Dommeriana.
- ——— (1752). Novum Testamentum Graecum editionis receptae cum lectionibus variantibus codicum manuscriptis … Tomus II. Amsterdam: Ex Officina Dommeriana.
- ———; Bengel, Johann Albrecht; Ridley, Glocester; Michaelis, Johann David; Semler, Joh Salomo (1766). Libelli ad crisin: atque interpretationem Novi Testamenti. Halae Magdeburgicae: Ioann. Godofred. Trampe.
