= Johann Martin Augustin Scholz =

German orientalist and biblical scholar (1794–1852)

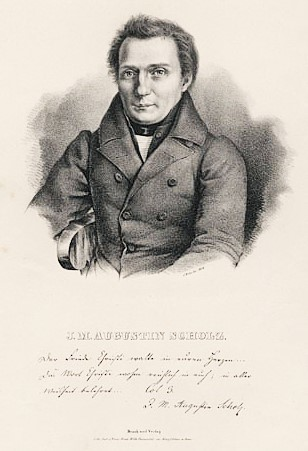
- Born: 8 February 1794; Kapsdorf, near Breslau, Prussia
- Died: 20 October 1852 (aged 58); Bonn, Prussia

Academic background
- Education: University of Freiburg
- Doctoral advisor: Johann Leonhard Hug

Academic work
- Discipline: Theology; Oriental Studies; Biblical Studies; New Testament
- Institutions: University of Bonn
- Notable works: Novum Testamentum Graece, 2 vols. (Leipzig 1830, 1836)

Johann Martin Augustin Scholz (8 February 1794 – 20 October 1852) was a German Roman Catholic orientalist, biblical scholar and academic theologian. He was a professor at the University of Bonn and travelled extensively throughout Europe and the Near East in order to locate manuscripts of the New Testament.

== Life ==
Scholz attended secondary school at the Catholic gymnasium in Breslau and then studied at the University of Breslau. In 1817 he was granted the degree of Doctor of Theology by the University of Freiburg, where he had studied under Johann Leonhard Hug (1765-1846). Scholz then went to Paris, where he studied Persian and Arabic under Silvestre de Sacy, and collated numerous codices (Greek, Latin, Arabic and Syriac) of the New Testament. From Paris he went to London, then travelled through France and Switzerland en route to Italy, the principal libraries of which he visited in order to conduct biblical research. In the autumn of 1821, upon his return from a journey through Egypt, Palestine and Syria, and having been ordained at Breslau (in October 1821), Scholz became professor of exegesis at the University of Bonn, a chair to which he had been called in 1820, and which he filled until his death, despite the fact that he was not an interesting lecturer.

In 1837, Scholz was appointed canon of the Cologne Cathedral.

== Work ==
In addition to his major work, his Novum Testamentum Graece (a text edition of the Greek New Testament), Scholz was also known for his efforts in Bible translation, in which he continued the work begun by Dominikus von Brentano and Anton Dereser.

Scholz's work in textual criticism was particularly appreciated by the British. He was able to add to the list of Greek manuscripts of the New Testament 616 new minuscule manuscripts. His additions to the list of uncials comprise only Codex Sangallensis (Δ) and three fragments of the Gospels 0115 (formerly W^{a}), 054 (his Y), and the Vatican portion of N022 (his Γ). These manuscripts were partially examined and collated by him. Results of his work were published between 1830 and 1836.

Scholz's accession of new witnesses to the lists of New Testament manuscripts was extensive. He was responsible for adding codices 260-469 of the Gospels, 110-192 of the Acts, 125-246 of the Pauline epistles, 51-89 of the Apocalypse, 51-181 of the Evangelistaria, and 21-48 of the Apostoloi.

Scholz collated the entire text of five manuscripts: 262, 299, 300, 301 and 346. Other manuscripts he collated in large part: (260, 270, 271, 277, 284, 285, 298, 324, 353, 382 and 428).

Scholz divided all New Testament manuscripts into five families: two African (Alexandrian and Western), one Asiatic, one Byzantine and one Cyprian. He was the first to emphasize the importance of ascertaining the geographical provenance of a witness. That point was elaborated by B. H. Streeter in 1924 ("theory of local texts"). Scholz, after some tentative attempts at classifying manuscripts, rejected this theory and adopted Johann Albrecht Bengel's division into two families, which he called the Alexandrian and the Constantinopolitan. He initially favoured the Constantinopolitan (Byzantine) family of manuscripts, but in 1845 he retracted this preference for the Constantinopolitan.

== Select publications ==
- Curae criticae in historiam textus Evangeliorum: commentationibus duabus, Heidelberg 1820
- Reise in die Gegend zwischen Alexandrien und Parätonium, die libysche Wüste, Siqa, Egypten, Palästina und Syrien, Leipzig, 1822 (Reprint: Georg Olms Verlag, 2005)
- Biblisch-kritische Reise in Frankreich, der Schweiz, Italien, Palästine und im Archipel in den Jahren 1818, 1819, 1820, 1821: Nebst einer Geschichte des Textes des Neuen Testaments, Leipzig, 1823
- Die heilige Schrift des neuen Testaments übersetzt, erklärt und in historisch-kritischen Einleitungen zu den einzelnen Büchern erläutert, Barrentrapp, Frankfurt a. M., 1829. vol. I: Die vier Evangelien, Franz Barrentrapp, Frankfurt am Main 1829; vol. II: Die Apostelgeschichte und die katholischen Briefe, ebenda 1830; vol. III: Die vierzehn Briefe des heiligen Apostels Paulus, ebenda 1830; Bd. IV: Die Apokalypse des heiligen Johannes des Apostels und Evangelisten, ebenda 1828)
- Die heilige Schrift des alten Testaments., Frankfurt, 1830-1837
- Novum Testamentum Graece. Textum ad fidem Testium Criticorum recensuit, Lectionum Familias subjecit, Leipzig, 1830-1836 (2 volumes), a critical edition of the original text, full of erudition but marred by a defective classification of authorities and by numerous critical inaccuracies.
- De virtutibus et vitiis utriusque Codd. N. T. familiae (Leipzig, 1845), a sort of supplement to the preceding work.
- Handbuch der biblischen Archäologie, Bonn, 1834
- Einleitung in die heiligen Schriften des alten und neuen Testaments, Köln, 1845
- Biblisch-kritische Reise in Frankreich, der Schweiz, Italien, Palästine und im Archipel in den Jahren 1818, 1819, 1820, 1821: Nebst einer Geschichte des Textes des N[euen] T[estaments]. Friedrich Fleischer, Leipzig und Sorau 1823 (Digitalisat bei Google Books)
- Handbuch der biblischen Archäologie. Adolph Mareus, Bonn 1834 (Digitalisat bei Google Books)
- Einleitung in die Schriften des A. u. N. T. (Cologne and Leipzig, 1845–1848, 3 vols, treating only of the Old Testament).

To these works may be added Scholz's own account of his travels: Reise in die Gegend; etc. (Leipzig, 1822); Biblisch-kritische Reise, etc. (Leipzig, 1823); his essays on the Holy Sepulchre (Bonn, 1825); on Jerusalem (Bonn, 1835); Curae criticae, containing a valuable description of Cod. K. Cyprius (Heidelberg, 1820); De fontibus historiae V. Test. (Bonn, 1830); and his discourse on the harmony of Divine revelation with science (Bonn 1845).
