= List of New Testament minuscules (1–100) =

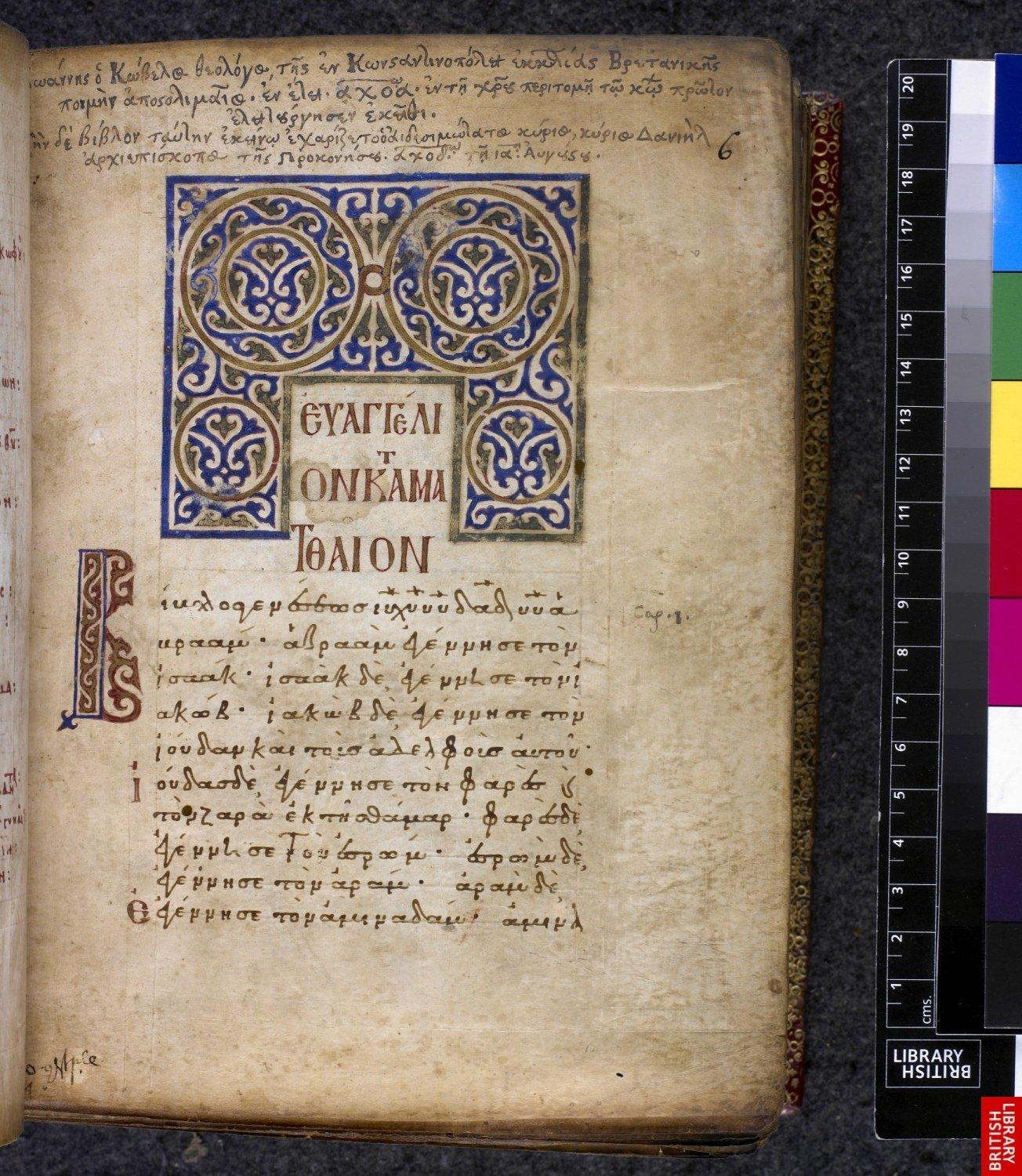
Codex Ussher 2/Harleianus 5776 (Minuscule 65) from 11th century.

A New Testament minuscule is a copy of a portion of the New Testament written in a small, cursive Greek script (developed from Uncial).

== Legend ==
- The numbers (#) are the now standard system of Caspar René Gregory, often referred to as the Gregory-Aland numbers.
- Included among the cataloged minuscules are the following types of manuscripts, color coded:

Grey represents continuous text manuscripts containing only New Testament portions
Beige represents manuscripts with New Testament portions and a catena (quotations from church fathers)
Light cyan represents manuscripts of single-author commentaries who included the full Scripture text.
Light red represents manuscripts of single-author commentaries who included both the full Scripture text and a catena.
Light purple represents manuscripts of commentaries where the Scripture text was abridged.
White represents manuscript numbers no longer in use.

- Dates are estimated to the nearest 100 year increment where specific date is unknown.
- Content generally only describes sections of the New Testament: Gospels, The Acts of the Apostles (Acts), Pauline epistles, and so on. Sometimes the surviving portion of a codex is so limited that specific books, chapters or even verses can be indicated. Linked articles, where they exist, generally specify content in detail, by verse.
- The two primary collections of manuscript images include the CSNTM ( "Manuscript Search". Center for the Student of New Testament Manuscripts. 7 July 2010.) and the INTF ( "Manuscript Workspace". New Testament Virtual Manuscript Room. Institut für Neutestamentliche Textforschung.) Other hosted images are referenced separately. Digital images are referenced with direct links to the hosting web pages, with the exception of those at the INTF. The quality and accessibility of the images is as follows:

Gold color indicates high resolution color images available online.
Tan color indicates high resolution color images available locally, not online.
Light tan color indicates only a small fraction of manuscript pages with color images available online.
Light gray color indicates black/white or microfilm images available online.
Light blue color indicates manuscript not imaged, and is currently lost or ownership unknown.
Light pink color indicates manuscript destroyed, presumed destroyed, or deemed too fragile to digitize.
Violet color indicates high resolution ultraviolet images available online.

† Indicates the manuscript has damaged or missing pages.
^{P} Indicates only a portion of the books were included.
^{K} Indicates manuscript also includes a commentary.
^{S} Indicates lost portions of manuscript replaced via supplement of a later hand.
^{abs} (abschrift) Indicates manuscript is copy.
[ ] Brackets around Gregory-Aland number indicate the manuscript belongs to an already numbered manuscript, was found to not be a continuous text manuscript, was found to be written in modern Greek versus Koine Greek, was proved a forgery, or has been destroyed.

== Minuscules 1-100 ==
#	Date	Contents	Pages	Institution and refs.	City, State	Country	Images
1	12th	Gospels, Acts, Pauline Epistles, General epistles	297	Basel University Library, A. N. IV. 2	Basel	Switzerland	INTF
1	12th	Gospels, Acts, Pauline Epistles, General epistles	297	Basel University Library, A. N. IV. 2	Basel	Switzerland	CSNTM
2	11th/12th	Gospels	248	Basel University Library, A. N. IV. 1	Basel	Switzerland	INTF
2	11th/12th	Gospels	248	Basel University Library, A. N. IV. 1	Basel	Switzerland	CSNTM
3	12th	Gospels, Acts, Pauline Epistles, General epistles	451	Austrian National Library, Cod. Suppl. gr. 52	Vienna	Austria	INTF, CSNTM
4	13th	Gospels	212	National Library, Grec 84	Paris	France	BnF, INTF, CSNTM
5	14th	Acts, General Epistles, Pauline epistles, Gospels	342	National Library, Grec 106	Paris	France	BnF, INTF
6	13th	Gospels, Acts, Pauline epistles, General Epistles	235	National Library, Grec 112	Paris	France	BnF, CSNTM, INTF
7	12th	Gospels	186	National Library, Grec 71	Paris	France	BnF, CSNTM
8	11th	Gospels	199	National Library, Grec 49	Paris	France	BnF, CSNTM, INTF
9	1167	Gospels	298	National Library, Grec 83	Paris	France	BnF, CSNTM, INTF
[9^{abs}]= 2883							
10	13th	Gospels	275	National Library, Grec 91	Paris	France	BnF, INTF, CSNTM
11	12th	Gospels	504	National Library, Grec 121, 122	Paris	France	BnF, CSNTM
11	12th	Gospels	504	National Library, Grec 121, 122	Paris	France	INTF
12	14th	Gospels	294	National Library, Grec 230	Paris	France	BnF, INTF, CSNTM
13	13th	Gospels	170	National Library, Grec 50	Paris	France	BnF, INTF, CSNTM
14	964	Gospels†	392	National Library, Grec 70	Paris	France	INTF
15	12th	Gospels	225	National Library, Grec 64	Paris	France	BnF, INTF, CSNTM
16	14th	Gospels	361	National Library, Grec 54	Paris	France	INTF
17	15th	Gospels	354	National Library, Grec 55	Paris	France	BnF, INTF, CSNTM
18	1364	New Testament	444	National Library, Grec 47	Paris	France	BnF, INTF, CSNTM
19	12th	Gospels	387	National Library, Grec 189	Paris	France	BnF, INTF, CSNTM
20	11th	Gospels	274	National Library, Grec 188	Paris	France	BnF, INTF, CSNTM
21	12th	Gospels†	203	National Library, Grec 68	Paris	France	BnF, INTF, CSNTM
22	12th	Gospels†	232	National Library, Grec 72	Paris	France	BnF, INTF, CSNTM
23	11th	Gospels†	230	National Library, Grec 77	Paris	France	BnF, INTF
24	10th	Gospels†	240	National Library, Grec 178	Paris	France	BnF, INTF, CSNTM
25	11th	Gospels†	292	National Library, Grec 191	Paris	France	BnF, INTF, CSNTM
26	11th	Gospels	179	National Library, Grec 78	Paris	France	BnF, INTF, CSNTM
27	10th	Gospels†	460	National Library, Grec 115	Paris	France	BnF, CSNTM, INTF
28	11th	Gospels†	292	National Library, Grec 379	Paris	France	BnF, CSNTM, INTF
29	10th	Gospels	169	National Library, Grec 89	Paris	France	BnF, INTF, CSNTM
30	15th	Gospels	313	National Library, Grec 100	Paris	France	INTF
[30^{abs}]= 2884							
31	13th	Gospels†	188	National Library, Grec 94	Paris	France	BnF
32	12th	Gospels†	244	National Library, Grec 116	Paris	France	BnF, INTF, CSNTM
33	9th	Gospels†, Acts†, General Epistles†, Pauline epistles†	143	National Library, Grec 14	Paris	France	BnF, INTF, CSNTM
34	10th	Gospels	469	National Library, Coislin 195	Paris	France	BnF, INTF
35	11th	New Testament	328	National Library, Coislin 199	Paris	France	BnF, INTF
36	10th	Gospels	509	National Library, Coislin 20	Paris	France	BnF
37	11th	Gospels	357	National Library, Coislin 21	Paris	France	INTF, BnF
38	12th	Gospels†, Acts, Pauline Epistles, General Epistles	300	National Library, Coislin 200	Paris	France	BnF, INTF
39	11th	Gospels	288	National Library, Coislin 23	Paris	France	BnF, INTF
40	11th	Gospels†	312	National Library, Coislin 22	Paris	France	INTF, BnF
41	11th	Matthew†, Mark†	224	National Library, Coislin 24	Paris	France	INTF, BnF
42	11th	Acts†, Pauline Epistles†, General Epistles† Revelation†	303	City Archives, Ms 17	Frankfurt (Oder)	Germany	INTF
43	11th	Gospels†, Acts†, Pauline Epistles†, General Epistles†	388	Library of the Arsenal, 8409, 8410	Paris	France	BnF, CSNTM, INTF
44	12th	Gospels	259	British Library, Add MS 4949	London	UK	BL
44	12th	Gospels	259	British Library, Add MS 4949	London	UK	INTF
45	13th	Gospels†	398	Bodleian Library, MS. Barocci 31	Oxford	UK	DB
45	13th	Gospels†	398	Bodleian Library, MS. Barocci 31	Oxford	UK	INTF
46	1300	Gospels	342	Bodleian Library, MS. Barocci 29	Oxford	UK	DB
46	1300	Gospels	342	Bodleian Library, MS. Barocci 29	Oxford	UK	INTF
47	15th	Gospels	554	Bodleian Library, MS. Auct. D. 5. 2	Oxford	UK	CSNTM, INTF
48	12th	Gospels	145	Bodleian Library, MS. Auct. D. 2. 17	Oxford	UK	INTF
49	12th	Gospels	223	Bodleian Library, MS. Roe 1	Oxford	UK	INTF
50	11th	Gospels†	241	Bodleian Library, MS. Laud. Gr. 33	Oxford	UK	INTF
51	13th	Gospels†, Acts, Pauline Epistles, General Epistles†	325	Bodleian Library, MS. Laud. Gr. 31	Oxford	UK	INTF
52	1285-6	Gospels	158	Bodleian Library, MS. Laud. Gr. 3	Oxford	UK	INTF
52	1285-6	Gospels	158	Bodleian Library, MS. Laud. Gr. 3	Oxford	UK	DB
53	13/14th	Gospels	140	Bodleian Library, MS. Selden Supra 28	Oxford	UK	INTF
54	1337-8	Gospels	230	Bodleian Library, MS. Selden Supra 29	Oxford	UK	INTF
55	14th	Gospels	349	Bodleian Library, MS. Selden Supra 6	Oxford	UK	INTF
55	14th	Gospels	349	Bodleian Library, MS. Selden Supra 6	Oxford	UK	DB
56	15th	Gospels	232	Lincoln College, Gr. 18	Oxford	UK	CSNTM, INTF
57	12th	Gospels, Acts, Pauline epistles, General Epistles	291	Magdalen College, Gr. 9	Oxford	UK	DB
57	12th	Gospels, Acts, Pauline epistles, General Epistles	291	Magdalen College, Gr. 9	Oxford	UK	INTF
58	15th	Gospels	342	New College, 68	Oxford	UK	CSNTM, INTF
59	13th	Gospels	238	Gonville and Caius College, Ms 403/412	Cambridge	UK	INTF
60	1297	Gospels	291	Cambridge University Library, Dd. 9.69, fol. 4–294	Cambridge	UK	CSNTM, INTF
61	16th	New Testament	455	Trinity College, MS 30	Dublin	Ireland	TCD, INTF
62	14th	Acts†, Pauline Epistles†, General Epistles†	135	National Library, Gr. 60	Paris	France	BnF, INTF
63	10th	Gospels†	237	Trinity College, MS 31 fol. 1-237	Dublin	Ireland	TCD, INTF
64	12th	Gospels	443	Museum of the Bible, G.C.MS.000474.1-.2	Washington, DC	USA	MOTB
64	12th	Gospels	443	Museum of the Bible, G.C.MS.000474.1-.2	Washington, DC	USA	INTF
65	11th	Gospels	309	British Library, Harley MS 5776	London	UK	BL
65	11th	Gospels	309	British Library, Harley MS 5776	London	UK	INTF
66	14th	Gospels	298	Trinity College, O. VIII 3	Cambridge	UK	INTF
67	10th	Gospels†	202	Bodleian Library, MS. Auct. E. 5. 11	Oxford	UK	INTF
67	10th	Gospels†	202	Bodleian Library, MS. Auct. E. 5. 11	Oxford	UK	BL
68	11th	Gospels	291	Lincoln College, Gr. 17	Oxford	UK	INTF
69	15th	New Testament†	213	Leicestershire Record Office, Cod. 6 D 32/1	Leicester	UK	CSNTM, INTF
70	15th	Gospels	186	Cambridge University Library, L1.2.13	Cambridge	UK	INTF
71	1160	Gospels	265	Lambeth Palace, MS528	London	UK	LP, CSNTM, INTF
72	11th	Gospels	268	British Library, Harley MS 5647	London	UK	BL
72	11th	Gospels	268	British Library, Harley MS 5647	London	UK	INTF
73	12th	Gospels	291	Christ Church, Wake 26	Oxford	UK	INTF
74	1291-2	Gospels†	204	Christ Church, Wake 20	Oxford	UK	INTF
75	11th	Gospels	484	Geneva Library, Gr. 19	Geneva	Switzerland	INTF
76	12th	Gospels, Acts, Pauline Epistles, General Epistles	358	Austrian National Library, Theol. Gr. 300	Vienna	Austria	CSNTM, INTF
77	11th	Gospels	302	Austrian National Library, Theol. Gr. 154	Vienna	Austria	CSNTM, INTF
78	12th	Gospels	296	National Széchényi Library, Cod. Graec. 1	Budapest	Hungary	INTF
79	15th	Gospels	208	Leiden University Library, B. P. Gr. 74	Leiden	Netherlands	INTF
80	12th	Gospels	309	National Library, Smith-Lesouëf 5	Paris	France	INTF
81	1044	Acts†	57	British Library, Add MS 20003	London	UK	BL
81	1044	Pauline Epistles†	225	Greek Orthodox Patriarchate, 59	Alexandria	Egypt	INTF
82	10th	Acts, Pauline Epistles, Revelation	246	National Library, Grec 237	Paris	France	BnF, INTF, CSNTM
83	11th	Gospels	321	Bavarian State Library, Cod.graec. 518	Munich	Germany	BSB
83	11th	Gospels	321	Bavarian State Library, Cod.graec. 518	Munich	Germany	CSNTM, INTF
84	12th	Matthew, Mark	66	Bavarian State Library, Cod.graec. 568	Munich	Germany	BSB, INTF
85	13th	Matthew† 8:15-9:17, 16:12-17:20, 24:26-45, 26:35-54; Mark† 6:13-9:45; Luke† 3:12-6:44; John† 9:7-12:5, 20:23-21:11	30	Bavarian State Library, Cod.graec. 569	Munich	Germany	BSB, INTF
86	11th/12th	Gospels	281	Slovak Academy of Sciences, 394 kt	Bratislava	Slovakia	CSNTM
86	11th/12th	Gospels	281	Slovak Academy of Sciences, 394 kt	Bratislava	Slovakia	INTF
87	11th	John	231	Cusanusstift, Bd. 18	Bernkastel-Kues	Germany	INTF
88	12th	Acts, Pauline Epistles, General Epistles, Revelation 1:1-3:13†	123	Victor Emmanuel III National Library, Ms. II. A. 7	Naples	Italy	CSNTM, INTF
89	1289–90	Gospels	173	Göttingen University Library, Cod. Ms. theol. 28 Cim.	Göttingen	Germany	INTF
90	16th	Gospels, Acts, Pauline Epistles, General Epistles	480	University of Amsterdam, Remonstr. 186	Amsterdam	Netherlands	INTF
91	11th	Acts†, Pauline Epistles†, Revelation†	313	National Library, Grec 219	Paris	France	BnF, INTF
92	10th	Mark	141	Basel University Library O. II. 27	Basel	Switzerland	INTF
93	10th/11th	Acts, Pauline Epistles†, General Epistles, Revelation	270	National Library, Coislin 205	Paris	France	INTF, BnF
94	12th/13th	Acts, Pauline Epistles, General Epistles	302	National Library, Coislin 202 bis (fol. 27-328)	Paris	France	INTF
95	12th	Luke, John	110	Lincoln College, Gr. 16	Oxford	UK	INTF
96	15th	Gospel of John	62	Bodleian Library, MS. Auct. D. 5. 1	Oxford	UK	INTF
[96^{abs}]= 2885							
97	12th	Acts, Pauline Epistles, General Epistles	204	Herzog August Library, Gud. Graec. 104.2	Wolfenbüttel	Germany	INTF
98	11th	Gospels	222	Bodleian Library, MS. E. D. Clarke 5	Oxford	UK	INTF
99	15th/16th	Matthew† 4:8-5:27; 6:2-15:30; Luke 1:1-13†	22	University of Leipzig, Cod. Gr. 8	Leipzig	Germany	INTF
100	10th	Gospels	374	Eötvös Loránd University, Cod. Gr. 1	Budapest	Hungary	INTF

[top]

== See also ==
- List of New Testament papyri
- List of New Testament uncials
- List of New Testament minuscules (1–1000)
- List of New Testament minuscules (1001–2000)
- List of New Testament minuscules (2001–)
- List of New Testament minuscules ordered by Location/Institution
- List of New Testament lectionaries

== Bibliography ==
- Aland, Kurt; M. Welte; B. Köster; K. Junack (1994). Kurzgefasste Liste der griechischen Handschriften des Neues Testaments. Berlin, New York: Walter de Gruyter. p. 95. ISBN 3-11-011986-2.
- "Liste Handschriften". Münster: Institute for New Testament Textual Research.
