= Minuscule 99 =

- New Testament manuscript
- Name: Codex Lipsiensis
- Text: Gospel of Matthew, Gospel of Luke †
- Date: 15th/16th century
- Script: Greek
- Now at: Leipzig University
- Size: 21 cm by 17.5 cm
- Type: Byzantine text-type
- Category: V
- Note: marginalia

Minuscule 99 (in the Gregory-Aland numbering), ε 597 (von Soden), known as Codex Lipsiensis is a Greek minuscule manuscript of the New Testament, on parchment leaves. Palaeographically it has been assigned to the 15th or 16th century. The manuscript is very lacunose. It has marginalia and was adapted for liturgical use.

== Description ==
The codex contains fragments of the Gospel of Matthew and Gospel of Luke on 22 leaves (size 21 cm by 17.5 cm). The text is written in one column per page, 21-23 lines per page (15.5 by 13.5 cm). To the present day only texts of Matthew 4:8-5:27; 6:2-15:30; Luke 1:1-13 have survived. The initial letters in red. Full of iotacism errors.

The text is divided according to the κεφαλαια (chapters), whose numbers are given at the margin (only in Luke), and their τιτλοι (titles of chapters) at the top of the pages. There is also a division according to the Ammonian Sections, no references to the Eusebian Canons.

It contains the Epistula ad Carpianum, tables of the κεφαλαια (tables of contents) before each Gospel, synaxaria (from 10th century), lectionary markings (for liturgical use), and incipits.

== Text ==
The Greek text of the codex is a representative of the Byzantine text-type. Aland placed it in Category V. It was not examined by the Claremont Profile Method.

In Matthew 10:12 it reads λεγοντες ειρηνη τω οικω τουτω for αυτην – the reading is supported by manuscripts: Sinaiticus*^{,2}, Bezae, Regius, Washingtonianus, Koridethi, Φ, f^{1}, 22, 237, 251, 1010, (1424), ℓ 49, it vg^{cl}.

== History ==
The manuscript was examined by Matthaei. Wettstein by number 99 designated Gregory's 155.

It is currently housed at the Leipzig University (Cod. Gr. 8), at Leipzig.

== See also ==
- List of New Testament minuscules
- Biblical manuscript
- Textual criticism
- Lectionary 178
