= Minuscule 734 =

- New Testament manuscript
- Text: Gospels †
- Date: 14th century
- Script: Greek
- Now at: Bibliothèque nationale de France
- Size: 29.9 cm by 22 cm
- Type: Byzantine text-type
- Category: V
- Note: –

Minuscule 734 (in the Gregory-Aland numbering), Θ^{ε48} (von Soden), is a Greek minuscule manuscript of the New Testament written on parchment. Palaeographically it has been assigned to the 14th century. The manuscript has no complex contents. Scrivener labelled it as 752^{e}.

== Description ==
The codex contains the text of the Gospel of John, Gospel of Matthew, and Gospel of Luke, on 297 parchment leaves (size 29.9 cm by 22 cm). The leaves 269-297 are paper. It is ornamented.

The text of the Gospel of Mark has lost. Only Prolegomena to Mark has survived.

The order of books: John, Matthew, Luke, and Mark. The same order has minuscule 19 and 427.

The text is written in one column per page, 37 lines per page.

== Text ==
The Greek text of the codex is a representative of the Byzantine text-type. Aland placed it in Category V.

It was not examined by using the Claremont Profile Method.

== History ==
Scrivener and Gregory dated the manuscript to the 14th or 15th century. The manuscript is currently dated by the INTF to the 14th century.

The manuscript formerly belonged to Arsenios from Monembasia.

The manuscript was added to the list of New Testament manuscripts by Scrivener (752) and Gregory (734). It was examined and described by Paulin Martin. Gregory saw the manuscript in 1885.

The manuscript is now housed at the Bibliothèque nationale de France (Gr. 192) in Paris.

== See also ==
- List of New Testament minuscules
- Biblical manuscript
- Textual criticism
