= Minuscule 54 =

- New Testament manuscript
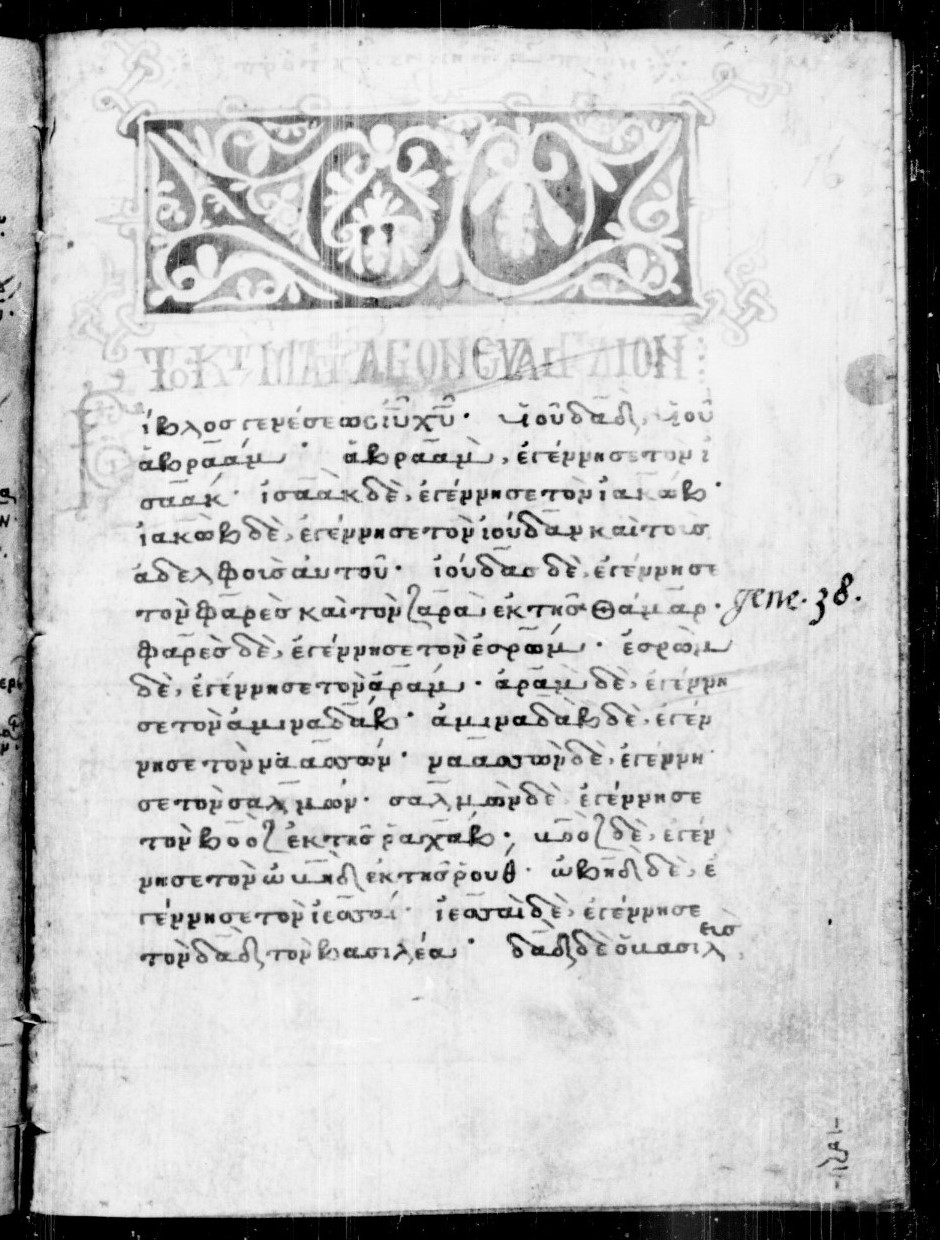
- The beginning of the Gospel of Matthew
- Text: Gospels
- Date: 1337/1338
- Script: Greek
- Now at: Bodleian Library
- Size: 16.3 cm by 12 cm
- Type: Byzantine text-type
- Category: V

Minuscule 54 (in the Gregory-Aland numbering), ε 445 (Von Soden), is a Greek minuscule manuscript of the New Testament, on parchment leaves. It is dated by a colophon to the year 1337 or 1338. It has complex contents and marginalia.

== Description ==
The codex contains complete text of the four Gospels on 230 leaves (size 16.3 cm by 12 cm). The text is written in one column per page, 23-27 lines per page. Name of scribe was Theodosius.

The text was broken up into paragraphs, beginning with red capital letters. The text is divided according to the κεφαλαια (chapters), whose numbers are given at the margin, with their τιτλοι (titles) at the top of the pages. There is also a division according to the smaller Ammonian Sections, but no references to the Eusebian Canons.

It contains synaxaria, Menologion, Eusebian Canon tables at the beginning, tables of the κεφαλαια (tables of contents) before each Gospel, lectionary markings at the margin (for liturgical use), pictures, and subscriptions at the end of the Gospels.

== Text ==
The Greek text of the codex is a representative of the Byzantine text-type. Hermann von Soden classified it to the Textual family K^{x}. Aland placed it in Category V. According to the Claremont Profile Method it has mixed Byzantine text in Luke 1 and Luke 10; in Luke 20 it represents K^{x}. It is related to the Π.

The manuscript was ancestor for the codices 47, 56, 58. Its text is familiar to the manuscript 171 and 109.

== History ==
The manuscript was written by Theodosius. In 1636 William Laud presented the manuscript to the Bodleian Library. It was examined by Mill (Selden 2) and Bentley. Bentley used it as codex κ. C. R. Gregory saw it in 1883.

It is currently housed in at the Bodleian Library (Selden Supra 29), at Oxford.

== See also ==
- List of New Testament minuscules
- Biblical manuscript
- Textual criticism
