= Minuscule 46 =

- New Testament manuscript
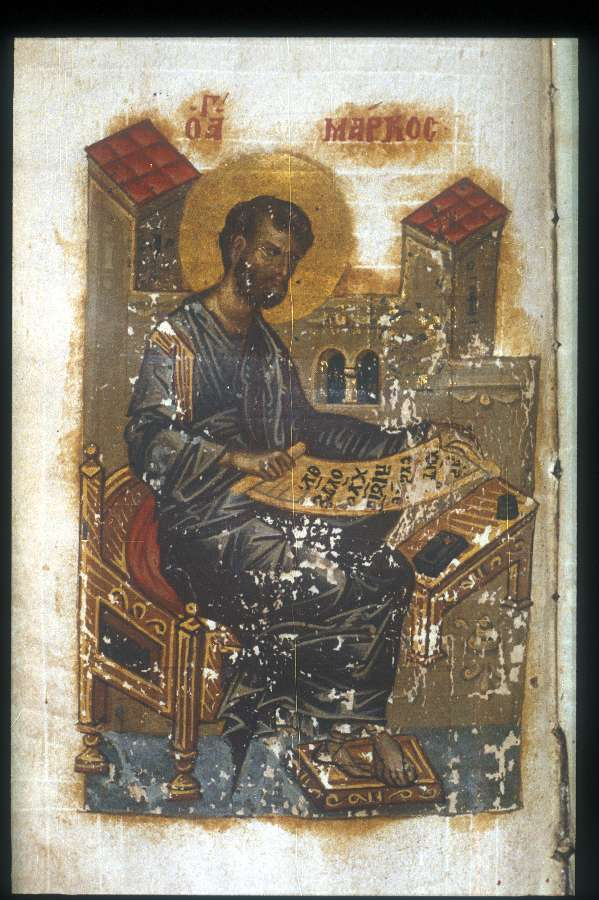
- Folio 117 verso, Mark Evangelist
- Name: Codex Baroccianus 29
- Text: Gospels
- Date: ca. 1300
- Script: Greek
- Now at: Bodleian Library
- Size: 18.5 cm by 12.5 cm
- Type: Byzantine text-type
- Category: V
- Note: marginalia

Minuscule 46 (in the Gregory-Aland numbering), ε 1285 (Von Soden), is a Greek minuscule manuscript of the New Testament, on parchment leaves. Paleographically it has been assigned to the 13th century. It has complex contents and full marginalia.

== Description ==
The codex contains the complete text of the four Gospels on 342 leaves (size 18.5 cm by 12.5 cm). The text is written stichometrically in one column per page, 18 lines per page.

The text is divided according to the κεφαλαια (chapters), whose numerals are given at the margin, and their τιτλοι (titles of chapters). There is also another division according to the smaller Ammonian Sections (in Matthew 355; Mark 241 – 16:20, Luke 342, John 232 sections) with references to the Eusebian Canons.

It contains the Epistula ad Carpianum, Eusebian Canon tables, prolegomena to John, tables of the κεφαλαια (tables of contents) before each Gospel, lectionary markings at the margin (for liturgical use), incipits, αναγνωσεις (in Matthew 116, Mark 71, Luke 114, John 67), synaxaria, Menologion, subscriptions at the end of each Gospel, numbers of στιχοι, and pictures.

== Text ==
The Greek text of the codex is a representative of the Byzantine text-type. Aland placed it in Category V.

According to the Claremont Profile Method it represents textual family K^{x} in Luke 1 and Luke 20. In Luke 10 no profile was made. It creates cluster 46.

According to Gregory its text often agrees with Minuscule 52 and 61.

== History ==
The manuscript was dated by Scholz to the 15th, by Scrivener to the 11th century and by Gregory to 12th century. Currently it has been assigned by the INTF to the 13th century.

The date of the codex is estimated between 1296 and 1318.

The manuscript once belonged to Micheal Zorianos, to Francesco Barozzi (hence name of the codex).

It was examined by Mill (as Bodl. 2) and Griesbach.

The manuscript was added to the list of the New Testament manuscripts by J. J. Wettstein. C. R. Gregory saw it in 1883.

It is currently housed in at the Bodleian Library (Barocci 29), at Oxford.

== See also ==
- List of New Testament minuscules
- Biblical manuscript
- Textual criticism
