= Minuscule 134 =

- New Testament manuscript
- Text: Gospels
- Date: 12th century
- Script: Greek
- Now at: Vatican Library
- Size: 21.5 cm by 15.9 cm
- Type: Byzantine text-type
- Category: V
- Hand: elegant
- Note: marginalia

Minuscule 134 (in the Gregory-Aland numbering), ε 200 (Soden), is a Greek minuscule manuscript of the New Testament, on parchment leaves. Palaeographically it has been assigned to the 12th century. It has marginalia.

== Description ==
The codex contains the text of the four Gospels on 297 parchment leaves (size 21.5 cm by 15.9 cm). The text is written in one column per page, 20 lines per page (size of text 13.9 by 9.7) in brown ink. According to Scrivener it is written by an elegant hand.

The text is divided according to the κεφαλαια (chapters), whose numbers are given at the margin, and their τιτλοι (titles of chapters) at the top of the pages. The titles in gold. There is also another division according to the smaller Ammonian Sections (Mark 233 sections – 16:8), with references to the Eusebian Canons (written below Ammonian Section numbers).

It contains the Epistula ad Carpianum, Eusebian Canon tables, tables of the κεφαλαια (tables of contents) before each Gospel, synaxaria, Menologion, and pictures.

The Pericope Adulterae (John 7:53-8:11) is omitted.

== Text ==
The Greek text of the codex is a representative of the Byzantine text-type. Hermann von Soden classified it to the textual family Family K^{x}. Aland placed it in Category V. According to the Claremont Profile Method it belongs to the textual cluster 22b in Luke 1, Luke 10, and Luke 20, as a weak member.

== History ==
The manuscript was examined by Birch about 1782. C. R. Gregory saw it in 1886.

It is currently housed at the Vatican Library (Vat. gr. 364), at Rome.

== See also ==
- List of New Testament minuscules
- Biblical manuscript
- Textual criticism
- * * *
