= Lectionary 205 =

Lectionary ℓ 205
- New Testament manuscript
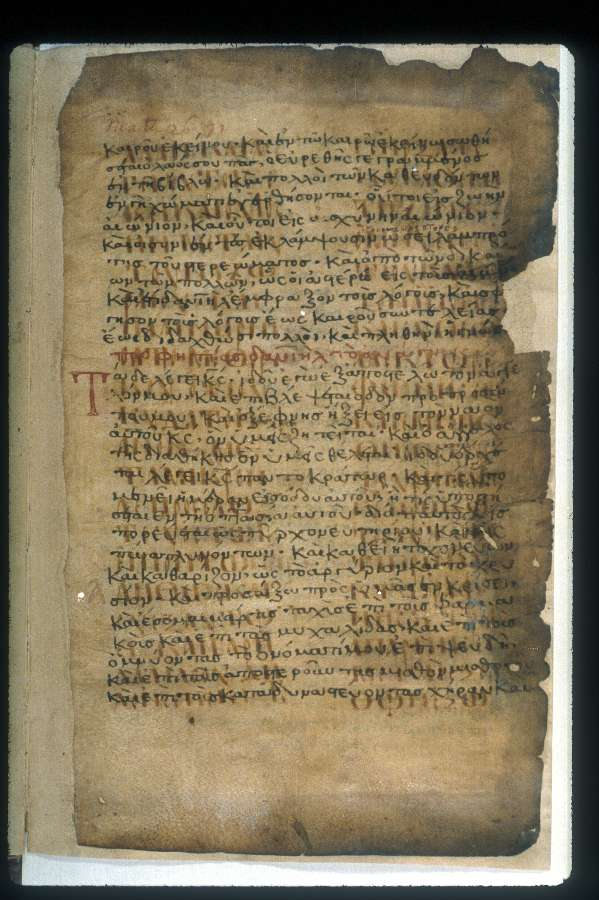
- Folio 3 recto
- Text: Evangelistarium
- Date: 10th century
- Script: Greek
- Now at: Bodleian Library
- Size: 29.5 cm by 19 cm
- Hand: beautiful copy

Lectionary 205, designated by siglum ℓ 205 (in the Gregory-Aland numbering) is a Greek manuscript of the New Testament, on parchment. Palaeographically it has been assigned to the 10th century. Scrivener labelled it by 201^{evl}. The manuscript has complex context.

== Description ==
The codex contains lessons from the Gospels lectionary (Evangelistarium), on 5 parchment leaves (29.5 cm by 19 cm). The text is written in Greek Uncial letters, in two columns per page, 20 lines per page, 6-12 letters. It contains musical notes. It was used for binding, a palimpsest. The upper text contains lessons from the Old Testament lectionary.

== History ==
Scrivener and Gregory dated it to the 11th century. It is presently assigned by the INTF to the 10th century.

The manuscript was added to the list of New Testament manuscripts by Scrivener (number 201) and Gregory (number 204). Gregory saw it in 1883.

The manuscript is not cited in the critical editions of the Greek New Testament (UBS3).

Currently the codex is located in the Bodleian Library (Barocci 197*) at Oxford.

== See also ==
- List of New Testament lectionaries
- Biblical manuscript
- Textual criticism

== Bibliography ==
- Gregory, Caspar René (1900). Textkritik des Neuen Testaments. Vol. 1. Leipzig. p. 404.
