= Minuscule 1210 =

Minuscule 1210 is a Greek minuscule manuscript of the New Testament. It does not contain the Pericope Adulterae.

== Location ==
It is located at Saint Catherine's Monastery on Mount Sinai in Egypt, where it is designated Gr. 173.

== Date ==
Gardthausen and Gregory dated 1210 to the eleventh or twelfth century. Welsby dated it to the twelfth century.

== Text ==
Alison Sarah Welsby identified it in John as a member of textual family 1 and a copy of Minuscule 22. Sve c

== See also ==
- List of New Testament minuscules
