= Minuscule 27 =

- New Testament manuscript
- Text: Gospels
- Date: 10th-century
- Script: Greek
- Now at: National Library of France
- Size: 16 cm by 12.1 cm
- Type: Byzantine text-type
- Category: V
- Note: marginalia

Minuscule 27 is a Greek minuscule manuscript of the New Testament Gospels, written on vellum. It is designated by the siglum 27. in the Gregory-Aland numbering of New Testament manuscripts, and ε 1023 in the von Soden numbering of New Testament manuscripts. Using the study of comparative writing styles (palaeography), it has been assigned to the 10th century. It has liturgical books and marginalia.

== Description ==
The manuscript is a codex (precursor to the modern book format), containing a complete text of the four Gospels, written on 460 leaves (sized 16 cm by 12.1 cm). From John 18:3 the original manuscript has had its original pages replaced with others supplied in a later hand. The text is written in one column per page, 19 lines per page. It is ornamented in gold and silver.

The text is divided according to the chapters (known as κεφαλαια / kephalaia), whose numerals are given in the margin, with their chapter titles (known as τιτλοι / titloi) written at the top of the pages. There is also a division according to the Ammonian Sections (241 in Mark, the last section in 16:20), with references to the Eusebian Canons written below the Ammonian Section numbers (both early systems of dividing the New Testament into sections).

It contains the tables of contents (also known as κεφαλαια) before each Gospel, along with pictures of the Evangelists. The liturgical books with hagiographies (known as the Synaxarion and Menologion) were added by a later hand. It was extensively altered by a later hand.

== Text ==
The Greek text of the codex is considered to be a representative of the Byzantine text-type; the text-types are groups of different manuscripts which share specific or generally related readings, which then differ from each other group, and thus the conflicting readings can separate out the groups, which are then used to determine the original text as published; there are three main groups with names: Alexandrian, Western, and Byzantine. Biblical scholar and textual critic Kurt Aland placed it in Category V according to his New Testament Manuscript classification system. Category V manuscripts are described as "manuscripts with a purely or predominantly Byzantine text." It belongs to the textual Family 1424.

According to the Claremont Profile Method (a specific analysis of textual data), it represents textual cluster M27 as a core member. It creates a cluster which comprises the following minuscule manuscripts: 71, 569, 692, 750, 1170, 1222, 1413, 1415, 1458, 1626, and 2715.

It has an interesting reading in Luke 10:21 that agrees with 𝔓^{45}, both omitting καὶ τῆς γῆς/and the earth, a reading reported by the early church fathers Tertullian and Epiphanius as being that in Marcion's edit of Luke's Gospel. In minuscule 27, the omitted text καὶ τῆς γῆς was inserted in the right hand margin as a correction.

== History ==
The earliest history of the manuscript is unknown. The first collation was prepared by Larroque (along with the codices 28-33), but according to Biblical scholar Frederick H. A. Scrivener, it was very imperfect. It was examined and described by biblical scholar John Mill (designated by him as Colb. 1), the textual critics Johann J. Wettstein, Johann M. A. Scholz (died 1852), and Paulin Martin. Biblical scholar Caspar René Gregory saw the manuscript in 1885.

The manuscript is dated by the INTF to the 11th-century. It is presently housed at the National Library of France (shelf number Gr. 115) in Paris.

== See also ==
- Minuscule 28
- Minuscule 26
- List of New Testament minuscules
- Biblical manuscripts
- Textual criticism
