= Codex Baroccianus =

Set of Greek manuscripts

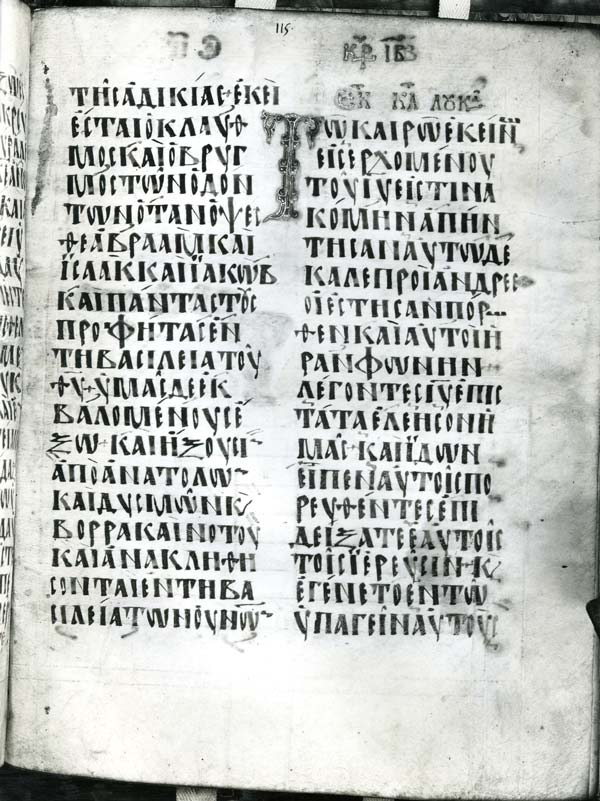
Codex Baroccianus 202

Codex Baroccianus 170

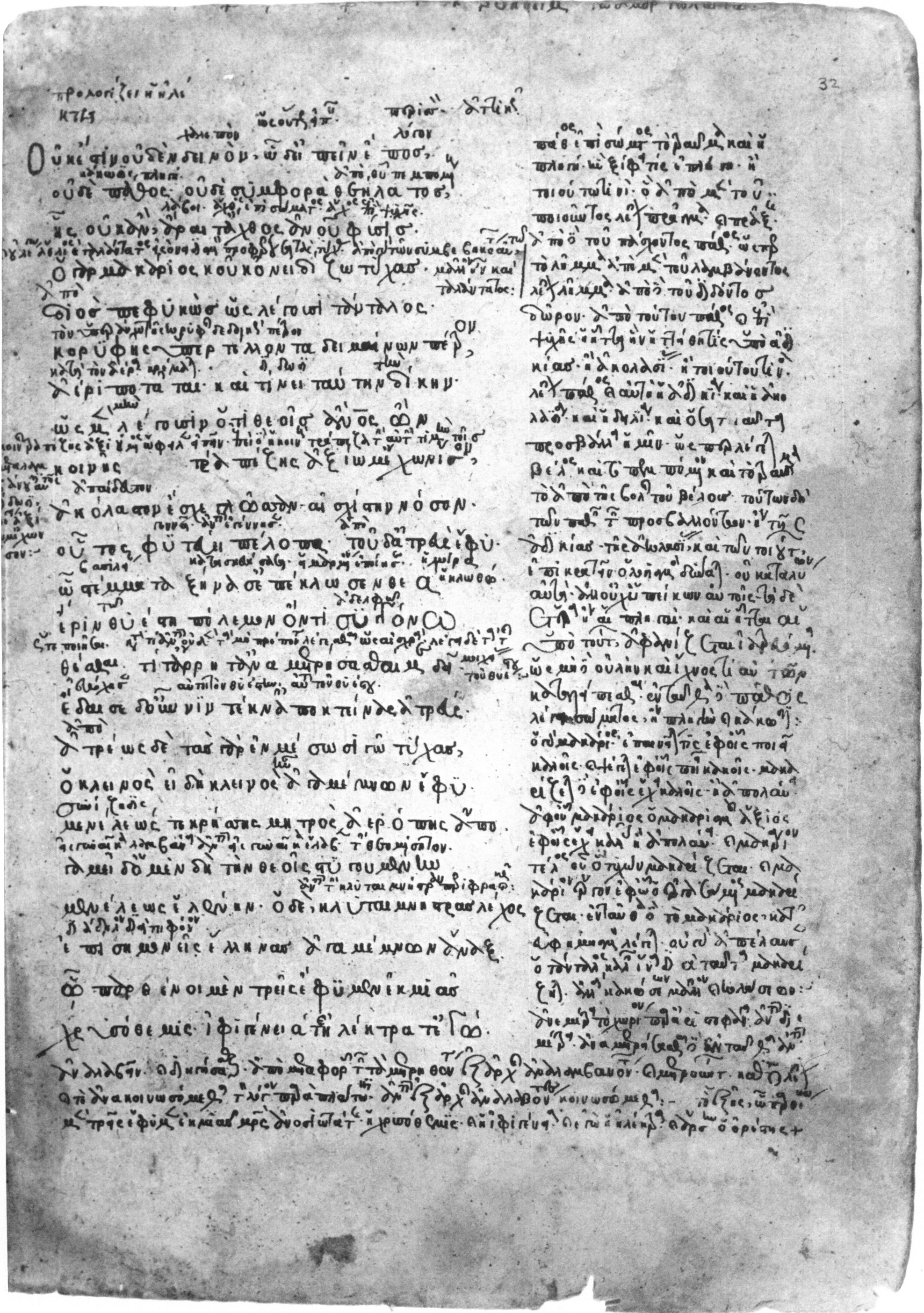
Euripides, Orestes, Oxford, MS. Barocci 120

Baroccianus is an adjective applied to manuscripts indicating an origin in the Baroccianum, a Venetian collection assembled by the humanist Francesco Barozzi (Barocius). A large part of that collection was sold after the death of Iacopo Barozzi or Barocci (1562–1617), nephew and heir to Francesco; and the purchase by William Herbert, 3rd Earl of Pembroke led in turn to his donation in 1629 of a substantial collection of Greek manuscripts from the Baroccianum to the Bodleian Library. The designation Codex Baroccianus followed by a number is an indication that a manuscript is in the Bodleian Catalogue and has its provenance in this donation.

== History ==
It is a collection that brings together mathematical, literary and theological texts. Inside there are works or modifications by Barozzi or Barocci; some pieces are originals saved after the fall of Constantinople. Subsequently Francesco's nephew, Iacopo Barozzi, inherited and enriched it.

The Earl of Pembroke's purchase cost him £700; his donation was bound in 242 volumes. He was persuaded to make the deal and gift by William Laud. Some remaining manuscripts from the collection were given by Oliver Cromwell in 1654. Both Pembroke and Cromwell were Chancellor of the University of Oxford at the time of their gifts.

In fact the manuscripts of Barozzi were already with Laud: they had been brought to England by Henry Featherstone in 1628. Featherstone acted as agent for the Bodleian, from 1621. In 1636, they were included in a Catalogue of the Greek manuscripts in the Bodleian Library made by the scholar Edmund Chilmead (died 1654), who edited and translated into Latin the Chronographia of John Malalas. Dr Edward Bernard made an extensive abstract of Chilmead's Catalogue of the Barozzi manuscripts.

The arrival of the Barocci manuscripts acted as a catalyst for Oxford’s printing ambitions. The origins of the Oxford University Press are connected with Laud's plan to have these manuscripts edited and published, even though it took around 40 years and the efforts of John Fell to take the practical steps to create a scholarly publishing house in Oxford. During those years, the Barocci manuscripts remained the foundation of the original project, standing as the blueprint for an editorial tradition that was still finding its definitive shape within the university’s academic landscape.

== Manuscripts ==
Some Manuscripts:

- Barocci 3 (minuscule 314 Gregory-Aland)
- Barocci 7 – Thucydides Contiones 15th century
- Barocci 15 – Psalterium in Greek, 1105 AD
- Barocci 28 – Euthymius Zigabenus, Commentaries on four Gospels, 14th century
- Barocci 29 (minuscule 46 Gregory-Aland)
- Barocci 31 (minuscule 45 Gregory-Aland)
- Barocci 55 – John Chrysostom, Homilies, 10th/11th century
- Barocci 59 (minuscule 526 Gregory-Aland)
- Barocci 96 – Menologion, palimpsest, the upper text contains poems of Gregorius Nazianzen
- Barocci 126 – Gregory Nazianzen, Homilies, 13th/14th century
- Barocci 142 – compilation of works on the history of Christianity
- Barocci 131
- Barocci 160 – Commentary on Psalms, 15th century
- Barocci 167 – John Chrysostom, Homilies on Acts of Apostles, 14th/15th century
- Barocci 170 – Oracles of Leo the Wise
- Barocci 197 (lectionary 205 Gregory-Aland)
- Barocci 201
- Barocci 202 (lectionary 5 Gregory-Aland)
- Barocci 206 – lectionary, 9th century, palimpsest
- Barocci 242 – John Chrysostom, Homilies on Genesis

== Authors ==
Some Authors:

3. Arethas
42. Manuel Moschopulus
94. Teucer
120. Euripides
182. John Malalas
