= Minuscule 40 =

- New Testament manuscript
- Text: Gospels †
- Date: 11th century
- Script: Greek
- Now at: Bibliothèque nationale de France
- Size: 30 cm by 22 cm
- Type: Byzantine text-type
- Category: V
- Note: marginalia

Minuscule 40 (in the Gregory-Aland numbering), A^{155} (Von Soden) is a Greek minuscule manuscript of the New Testament. Paleographically it has been assigned to the 11th century. It is written on vellum and has marginalia.

== Description ==
The codex contains almost complete text of the four Gospels on 312 parchment leaves (30 cm by 22 cm), with only two lacunae (Luke 21:21-23:32; John 20:25-21:25).

The text is written in 1 column per page (11.9 by 10.7 cm), biblical text in 18 lines per page, text of commentary in 48 lines per page (24.6 by 17.4 cm). The initial letters in red; iota subscriptum.

The text is divided according to the κεφαλαια (chapters), whose numbers are given at the margin, with their τιτλοι (titles of chapters) at the top of the pages. There is also another division according to the Ammonian Sections (in Mark 233, the last section in 16:8), with references to the Eusebian Canons.

It contains the Epistula ad Carpianum, Eusebian Canon tables, prolegomena, tables of the κεφαλαια (tables of contents) before each Gospel, and a commentary (Victor's in Mark).

== Text ==
The Greek text of the codex is a representative of the Byzantine text-type. Aland placed it in Category V. It was not examined by the Claremont Profile Method.

== History ==
The manuscript was dated by Gregory to the 11th or 12th century. Currently it has been assigned by the INTF to the 11th century.

Formerly it belonged to the Stavronikita Monastery on the Athos (as codex 34). It was examined and described by Wettstein, Scholz, and Paulin Martin.

The manuscript was added to the list of the New Testament manuscripts by Wettstein. C. R. Gregory saw the manuscript in 1885.

It is currently housed at the Bibliothèque nationale de France (Coislin Gr. 22) at Paris.

== See also ==
- List of New Testament minuscules
- Biblical manuscript
- Textual criticism
- Minuscule 41

== Works ==
- Bernard de Montfaucon, Bibliotheca Coisliniana olim Segueriana, Paris: Ludovicus Guerin & Carolus Robustel, 1715, p. 66.
