= Minuscule 526 =

- New Testament manuscript
- Name: Codex Baroccianus 59
- Text: Gospel of Luke-Gospel of John †
- Date: 11th century
- Script: Greek
- Now at: Bodleian Library
- Size: 21.5 cm by 14 cm
- Type: Byzantine text-type
- Category: V
- Note: full marginalia

Minuscule 526 (in the Gregory-Aland numbering), 610 (Scrivener's numbering), ε 1127 (in the Soden numbering), is a Greek minuscule manuscript of the New Testament, on a parchment, dated to the 11th century.

The manuscript was adapted for liturgical use. It is lacunose.

== Description ==
The codex contains the text of the Gospel of Luke 23:38-50; 24:46-53; Gospel of John 1:30-3:5 on 6 parchment leaves (size 21.5 cm by 14 cm). It is written in one column per page, 21 lines per page.

The text is divided according to the κεφαλαια (chapters), whose numbers are given the margin and their τιτλοι (titles of chapters) at the top of the pages. There is a division according to the Ammonian Sections (with a Harmony), but there is no references to the Eusebian Canons.

It contains the table of the κεφαλαια (table of contents) before Gospel of John, It contains a lectionary markings at the margin (for liturgical use), and incipits.

== Text ==
The Greek text of the codex is a representative of the Byzantine text-type. Aland placed it in Category V. Wisse did not examine this manuscript by using his profile method, because it has not in Luke chapters 1, 10, and 20.

== History ==
The manuscript has been dated by the INTF on the palaeographical ground to the 11th century.

In the 15th century the manuscript was bound in a book of other matter, on a paper.

The manuscript was added to the list of New Testament minuscule manuscripts by F. H. A. Scrivener (610) and C. R. Gregory (526).

The manuscript is currently housed at the Bodleian Library (MS. Barocci 59) in Oxford.

== See also ==
- List of New Testament minuscules
- Biblical manuscript
- Textual criticism
