= Minuscule 85 =

- New Testament manuscript
- Name: Codex Monacensis 569
- Text: Gospels †
- Date: 13th century
- Script: Greek
- Now at: Bavarian State Library
- Size: 14 cm by 9.7 cm
- Type: ?
- Category: none
- Hand: beautifully written
- Note: marginalia

Minuscule 85 (in the Gregory-Aland numbering), ε 391 (Soden), is a Greek minuscule manuscript of the New Testament, on parchment leaves. Palaeographically it has been assigned to the 13th century. It has marginalia.

== Description ==
The codex contains the text of the four Gospels, with numerous lacunae, on 30 parchment leaves (size 14 cm by 9.7 cm), with numerous lacunae. The text is written in one column per page, 25 lines per page (size of text 10.1 by 6.2). The initial letters are written in red.

The text is divided according to the κεφαλαια (chapters), whose numbers are given at the margin, and the τιτλοι (titles of chapters) at the top of the pages. There is also a division according to the Ammonian Sections, (no references to the Eusebian Canons).

It contains lectionary markings at the margin (for liturgical use), and incipits.

Contents

Matthew 8:15-9:17; 16:12-17.20; 24:26-45; 26:35-54; Mark 6:13-9.45; Luke 3:12-6.44; John 9:11-12:5; 19:6-24; 20:23-21:9.

Text

The Greek text of the codex Kurt Aland did not place in any Category. It was not examined by the Claremont Profile Method.

== History ==
The manuscript used to be held in Augsburg (as codices 83, 84).

It was examined by Bengel (as August. 3), Scholz, and Dean Burgon. C. R. Gregory saw it in 1887.

It is housed in at the Bavarian State Library (Gr. 569), at München.

== See also ==
- List of New Testament minuscules
- Biblical manuscript
- Textual criticism
