= Minuscule 91 =

- New Testament manuscript
- Name: Codex Perronianus
- Text: Acts, Paul, Rev. †
- Date: 11th century
- Script: Greek
- Now at: Bibliothèque nationale de France
- Size: 32.4 cm by 23.7 cm
- Type: Byzantine text-type
- Category: none
- Note: marginalia

Minuscule 91 (in the Gregory-Aland numbering), O^{14} (Soden), formerly known as Codex Perronianus 10, is a Greek minuscule manuscript of the New Testament, on parchment leaves. Palaeographically it has been assigned to the 11th century. Formerly it was dated to the 10th century (Scrivener, Gregory). Formerly it was labelled by 12^{a}, 16^{p} and 4^{r}. It has marginalia.

== Description ==
The codex contains the text of the four Acts, Catholic epistles, Paul, Rev., with some lacunae, on 313 parchment leaves (32.4 cm by 23.7 cm). The text is written in one column per page, 40 lines per page.

The text is divided according to the κεφάλαια (chapters), whose numbers are given at the margin, and the τίτλοι (titles of chapters) at the top of the pages.

It contains Prolegomena, tables of the κεφάλαια (tables of contents) before each book, Synaxarion, Menologion. It contains a few commentaries. The commentary on the Acts and Epistles is that of the pseudo-Oecumenius; that on the Book of Revelation is that of Arethas of Caesarea.

Hebrews is placed before 1 Timothy.

Kurt Aland the Greek text of the codex did not place in any Category.

== History ==
The manuscript belonged to the Medicis. Janus Lascaris presented it in 1518 to Pietro Merieli. Donatus of Verona in 1532 used it for the first edition of works of Oecumenius.

It once belonged to the "S. Taurini monasterium Ebriocense", then to Cardinal Perron's († 1618).

Bernard de Montfaucon sent John Mill extracts of this codex.

It was examined by Wettstein, Griesbach, Scholz, Grafton for Alford, and Paulin Martin. C. R. Gregory saw the manuscript in 1885.

Formerly it was labelled by 12^{a}, 16^{p} and 4^{r}. In 1908 Gregory gave number 91 for it.

It is currently housed in at the Bibliothèque nationale de France (Gr. 219), at Paris.

== See also ==
- List of New Testament minuscules
- Biblical manuscript
- Textual criticism
