= Lectionary 178 =

Lectionary ℓ 178
- New Testament manuscript
- Text: Apostolarion †
- Date: 9th century
- Script: Greek
- Now at: Leipzig University
- Size: 24.7 by 17.7 cm

Lectionary 178, designated by siglum ℓ 178 (in the Gregory-Aland numbering) is a Greek manuscript of the New Testament, on parchment leaves. Paleographically it had been assigned to the 9th century. Formerly it was labelled as Lectionary 71^{a} (Scrivener), 80^{a} (Gregory).

== Description ==
The originally codex contained Lessons from the Acts, Catholic, and Pauline epistles lectionary (Apostolarion), but major part of it is lost. It has numerous lacunae. In present-day it contains only one leaf with the text of Hebrews 1:3-12.

The text is written in Greek uncial letters, on 1 parchment leaf (24.7 by 17.7 cm), in two columns per page, 24 lines per page.

== History ==
The manuscript was brought from the East by Tischendorf. It was examined by C. R. Gregory in 1884.

The manuscript is not cited in the critical editions of the Greek New Testament (UBS3).

Currently the codex is located in the Leipzig University Library (Cod. Gr. 69).

== See also ==
- List of New Testament lectionaries
- Biblical manuscript
- Textual criticism

== Bibliography ==
- C. von Tischendorf, Anecdota sacra et profana (Leipzig, 1861), p. 37-38.
