= Minuscule 26 =

- New Testament manuscript
- Text: Gospels
- Date: 11th-century
- Script: Greek
- Now at: National Library of France
- Size: 24.1 cm by 18.5 cm
- Type: mixed
- Category: none
- Hand: neatly written

Minuscule 26 (in the Gregory-Aland numbering), ε 165 (von Soden), is a Greek minuscule manuscript of the New Testament, written on vellum, on 179 leaves. Palaeographically it has been assigned to the 11th-century. It has marginalia.

== Description ==
The codex contains a complete text of the four Gospels on 179 parchment leaves (24.1 cm by 18.5 cm) with lacunae. The text is written in one column per page, 27-28 lines per page. The text is written neatly and correctly.

The text is divided according to the κεφαλαια (chapters) whose numbers are given at the margin, and the τιτλοι (titles of chapters) at the top of the pages. There is also a division according to the Ammonian Sections (in Mark 240, the last in 16:19). There is no references to the Eusebian Canons.

It contains the Epistula ad Carpianum, Prolegomena, Eusebian Canon tables, lectionary markings at the margin (for liturgical use), liturgical books with hagiographies (Synaxarion, and Menologion).

Kurt Aland the Greek text of the codex did not place in any Category. According to the Claremont Profile Method it represents textual family K^{x} in Luke 10 and Luke 20. In Luke 1 it has mixture of the Byzantine families.

== History ==
The manuscript was written by Paulus, a scribe. It is dated by the INTF to the 11th-century.

It was added to the list of the New Testament manuscripts by Wettstein, who gave it the number 26. It was examined and described by Scholz (1794-1852), Paulin Martin, and Henri Omont. C. R. Gregory saw the manuscript in 1885.

It is currently housed at the Bibliothèque nationale de France (Gr. 78) at Paris.

== See also ==
- Minuscule 27
- Minuscule 25
- List of New Testament minuscules
- Biblical manuscripts
- Textual criticism
