= Minuscule 84 =

Greek manuscript

- New Testament manuscript
- Name: Codex Monacensis 568
- Text: Matthew, Mark †
- Date: 12th century
- Script: Greek
- Now at: Bavarian State Library
- Size: 17 cm by 13.2 cm
- Type: Byzantine text-type
- Category: V
- Note: marginalia

Minuscule 84 (in the Gregory-Aland numbering), ε 1219 (Soden), is a Greek minuscule manuscript of the New Testament, on parchment leaves. Palaeographically it has been assigned to the 12th century. It was adapted for liturgical use.

== Description ==
The codex contains the text of the four Gospel of Matthew and Gospel of Mark with numerous lacunae, on 66 thick parchment leaves (size 17 cm by 13.2 cm). The text is written in one column per page, 19-20 lines per page (size of text 11.1 cm by 9.1 cm).

The text is divided according to the κεφαλαια (chapters), whose numbers are given at the margin, with the τιτλοι (titles of chapters) at the top of the pages. There is also a division according to the Ammonian Sections, (no references to the Eusebian Canons).

It contains lectionary markings at the margin (for liturgical use), and incipits before some lectionary pericopas.

Contents

Matthew 1:18-13:10; 13:27-42; 14:3-18:25; 19:9-21.33; Matthew 22:4—Mark 7:14.

Text

The Greek text of the codex is a representative of the Byzantine text-type. Aland placed it in Category V.

== History ==
It was examined by Bengel (as August. 2), Scholz, and Burgon.

Formerly the manuscript was held in Augsburg (as codices 83 and 85). C. R. Gregory saw it in 1887.

It is currently housed in at the Bavarian State Library (Gr. 568), at München.

== See also ==
- List of New Testament minuscules
- Biblical manuscript
- Textual criticism
- Codex Monacensis
