= Minuscule 50 =

- New Testament manuscript
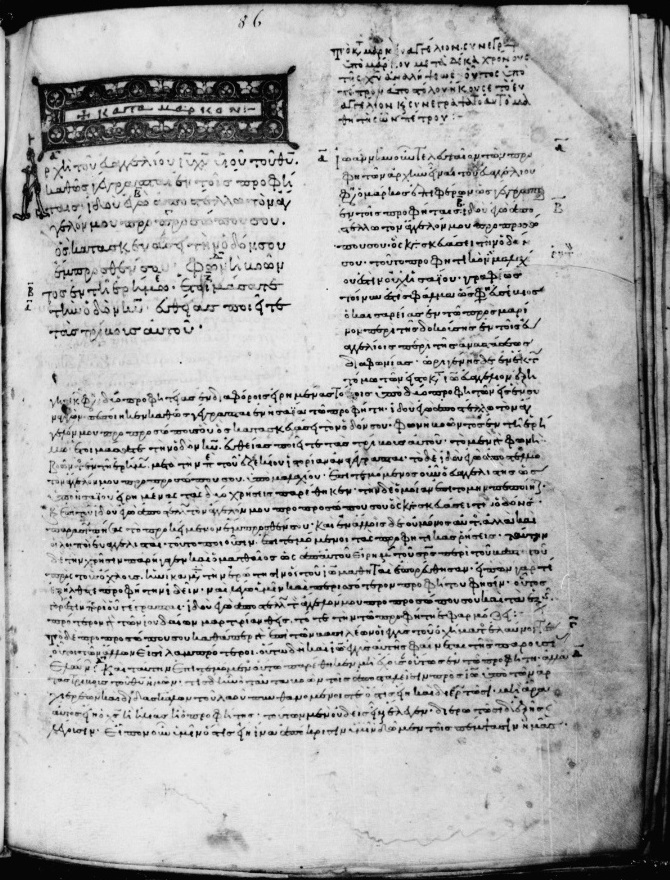
- Text: Gospels †
- Date: 11th century
- Script: Greek
- Now at: Bodleian Library
- Size: 29 cm by 22 cm
- Type: Byzantine text-type
- Category: V
- Note: marginalia

Minuscule 50 (in the Gregory-Aland numbering), A^{152} (von Soden), is a Greek minuscule manuscript of the New Testament, on parchment leaves. Palaeographically it has been assigned to the 11th century. The manuscript has survived incomplete.

== Description ==
The codex contains the text of the four Gospels on 241 leaves (size 29 cm by 22 cm) with a commentary. The text is written in one column per page, 18-26 lines per page. It has considerable lacunae (Matthew 1:1-9.35; 12:3-23; 17:12-24; 25:20-32; John 5:18-21:25).

The text is divided according to the κεφαλαια (chapters), whose numerals are given at the margin, and their τιτλοι (titles) at the top of the pages. There is also a division according to the smaller Ammonian Sections, with references to the Eusebian Canons.

The tables of the κεφαλαια (tables of contents) are placed before each Gospel. It contains subscriptions at the end of each Gospel, numbers of στιχοι (in Luke), and pictures. Text of Mark 14:40-16:20 was supplied by a later hand. The text is surrounded by a catena.

== Text ==
The Greek text of the codex is a representative of the Byzantine text-type. Hermann von Soden classified it to the textual family Family K^{x}. Aland placed it in Category V. It was not examined by the Claremont Profile Method.

It contains many unusual readings.

== History ==
The manuscript was dated by Gregory to the 11th or 12th century. Currently it has been assigned by the INTF to the 11th century.

In 1636 William Laud presented the manuscript to the Bodleian Library. It was examined by Mill (as Laud. 1) and Griesbach.

It was added to the list of the New Testament manuscripts by J. J. Wettstein. C. R. Gregory saw it in 1883.

It is currently housed in at the Bodleian Library (MS. Laud. Gr. 33), at Oxford.

== See also ==
- List of New Testament minuscules
- Biblical manuscript
- Textual criticism
