= Minuscule 18 =

- New Testament manuscript
- Text: New Testament
- Date: 1364
- Script: Greek
- Now at: National Library of France
- Size: 29 cm by 21 cm
- Type: Byzantine text-type
- Category: V
- Note: member of the K^{r} group

Minuscule 18 (in the Gregory-Aland numbering), δ 411 (Soden). It is a Greek minuscule manuscript of the New Testament. According to the colophon it was written in 1364 CE. The manuscript has complex contents. It has marginalia.

== Description ==
It is one of few copies of the whole New Testament and the Book of Psalms (Rahlfs no. 1732). It contains also liturgical books with hagiographies: synaxaria and Menologion.

The biblical text is written on 444 parchment leaves (28.9 cm by 21.3 cm) in one column per page with 23 lines per page in large uncial letters. The initial letters in red.

The text is divided according to the κεφαλαια (chapters), whose numbers are given at the margin, but there is no τιτλοι (titles of chapters) at the top of the pages. The text of the Gospels is not divided according to the Ammonian Sections, with references to the Eusebian Canons.

It contains prolegomena, tables of the κεφαλαια (tables of contents) preceded each sacred book, lectionary markings at the margin (for liturgical use), αναγνωσεις (lessons), subscriptions at the end of each book, numbers of στιχοι, and Euthalian Apparatus.

It is one of the few copies of the whole New Testament. The order of books is: Gospels, Book of Acts, Catholic epistles, Pauline epistles, and Apocalypse.

== Text ==
The Greek text of the codex is a representative of the Byzantine text-type. Hermann von Soden classified it to the textual family K^{r}. Aland placed it in Category V. According to the Claremont Profile Method it represents the textual family Family K^{r} in Luke 1 and Luke 20. In Luke 10 no profile was made.

In Matthew 10:12, at the margin near αυτην, stands a note with reading λεγοντες ειρηνη τω οικω τουτω. The reading is used by manuscripts: Sinaiticus*^{, 2}, Bezae, Regius, Washingtonianus, Koridethi, f ^{1}, 22, 1010, (1424), it, vg^{cl}.

== History ==
The colophon, at the end of the codex, on the page 444 informs: Η παρουσια θεια βιβλος εγραφη μεν, και ετελεστη κατα την μεγαλην πολιν εν τη σεβοτατη των μαγγανων μονη κατα το ςωοβ ετος. εδοθη δε και αφιερωθη παρ εμου νικηφορου του μυζιθρα της λακεδαιμονος καστρω περιεχουσα το ιερον ευαγγελιον και τον πραξαποστολον και το ψαλτηριον μετα της αυτου προθεωριας και της του θεολογου αποκαλυψεως. According to this colophon the manuscript was written in 6872, it means in 1364 CE, by Nicephorus Cannavus at Constantinople. Nicephorus, son of Kannabe, presented it to the monastery to Myzithra.

The manuscript was bought in 1687 in Constantinople.

It was added to the list of the New Testament manuscripts by Wettstein. It was examined by Griesbach, Scholz, Paulin Martin, J. G. Reiche, C. R. Gregory (1884), and Hoskier (only Apocalypse).

It is currently housed at the Bibliothèque nationale de France (Gr. 47) at Paris.

== See also ==
- Minuscule 19
- Minuscule 17
- List of New Testament minuscules
- Textual criticism
- Biblical manuscript
