= Minuscule 23 =

- New Testament manuscript
- Name: Colbertinus 3947
- Text: Gospels †
- Date: 11th-century
- Script: Greek
- Now at: National Library of France
- Size: 23 cm by 18.4 cm
- Type: Byzantine text-type
- Category: V
- Note: marginalia

Minuscule 23 (in the Gregory-Aland numbering), ε 1183 (von Soden), is a Greek minuscule manuscript of the New Testament, written on vellum. Palaeographically it has been assigned to the 11th-century. It has marginalia.

== Description ==
The codex contains a text of the four Gospels with some lacunae (Matthew 1:1-5.7-16; Luke 24:42-John 2:20; John 21:24.25), on 230 parchment leaves (23 cm by 18.4 cm). The text is written in one column per page, 22 lines per page. The initial letters in gold and colour.

The text is divided according to the κεφαλαια (chapters), whose numbers are given at the margin, and their τιτλοι (titles of chapters) at the top of the pages. There is also a division according to the smaller Ammonian Sections (no references to the Eusebian Canons).

It contains lists of the κεφαλαια (tables of contents) before each Gospel, and lectionary markings at the margin (for Church reading). It has the Latin Vulgate version down to Luke 4:18.

== Text ==
The Greek text of the codex is a representative of the Byzantine text-type. Aland placed it in Category V.

According to the Claremont Profile Method it represents the textual family K^{x} in Luke 10. In Luke 1 and Luke 20 (weak) it represents textual cluster Π1441.

Verse John 21:25 is omitted.

== History ==
The manuscript probably was written in Italy. It is dated by the INTF to the 11th-century.

It was partially examined and collated by Griesbach and Scholz (only 186 verses). It was examined and described by Paulin Martin. C. R. Gregory saw the manuscript in 1885.

It is currently housed at the Bibliothèque nationale de France (Gr. 77) in Paris.

== See also ==
- Minuscule 24
- Minuscule 22
- List of New Testament minuscules
- Textual criticism
