= Codex Montfortianus =

Minuscule 61
- New Testament manuscript
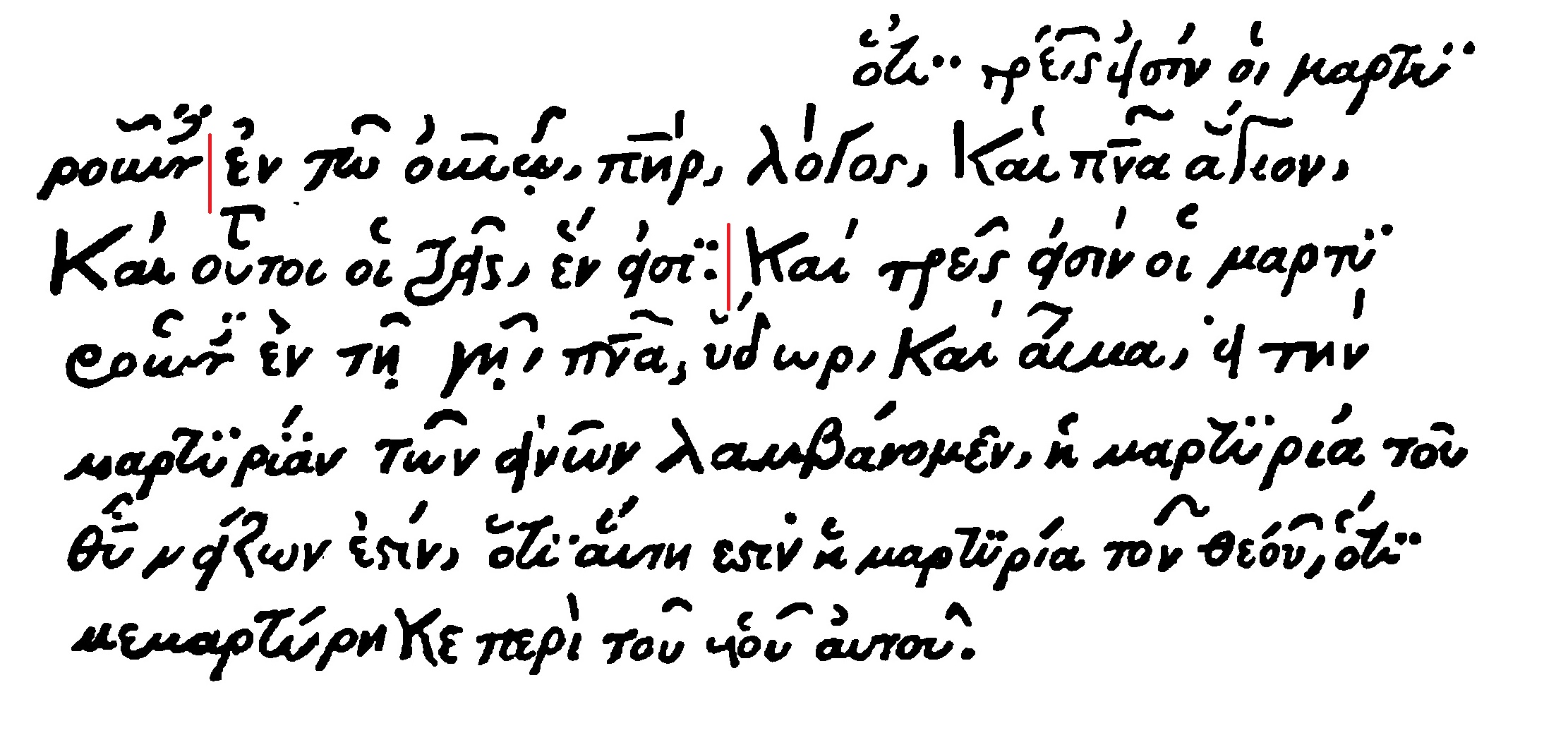
- Comma Johanneum
- Name: Codex Montfortianus
- Text: New Testament
- Date: c. 1520
- Script: Greek
- Now at: Trinity College, Dublin
- Size: 15.8 cm by 12 cm
- Type: mixed, Byzantine text-type (Gospels, Acts)
- Category: III, V
- Note: marginalia

Codex Montfortianus, also known as Minuscule 61, is a Greek minuscule manuscript of the New Testament written on paper. It is designated by 61 in the Gregory-Aland numbering of New Testament manuscripts, and δ 603 in the von Soden numbering of New Testament manuscripts. Biblical scholar Erasmus named it Codex Britannicus. Its completion is dated on the basis of its textual affinities to no earlier than the second decade of the 16th century, though a 15th-century date is possible on palaeographic grounds.

The manuscript is famous for including a unique version of the Comma Johanneum. It has marginal notes.

== Description ==
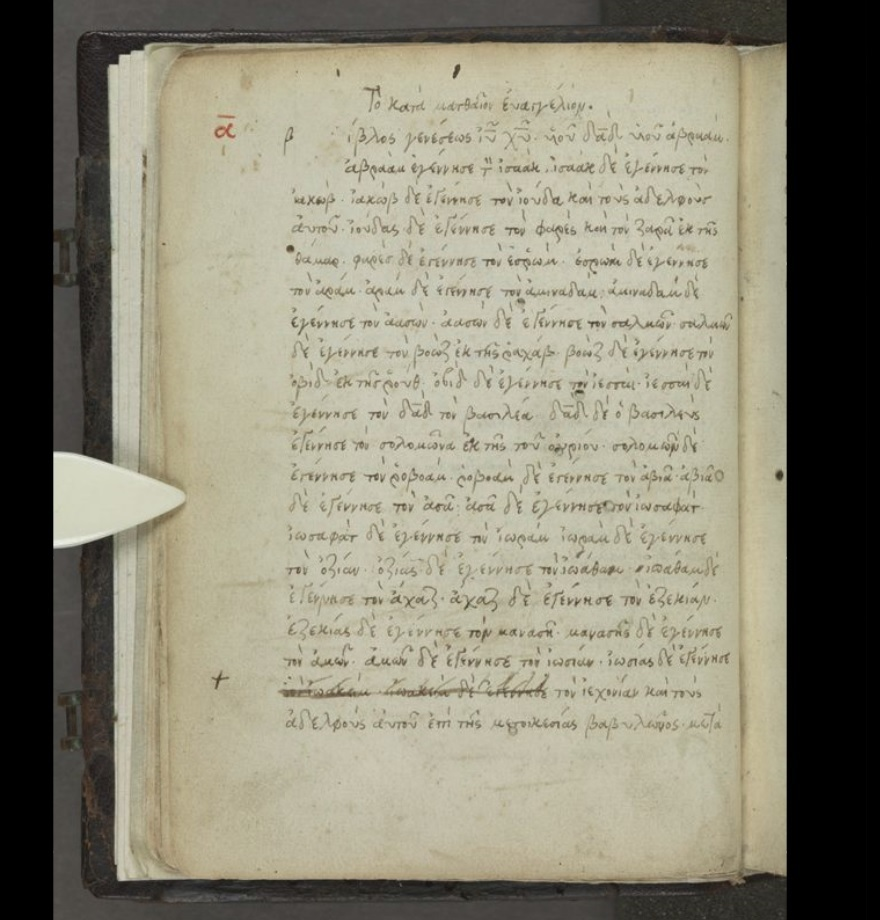
Gospel of Matthew

The manuscript is a codex (precursor to the modern book format), containing the entire text of the New Testament written on 455 paper leaves (sized 15.8 cm by 12 cm). The text is written in one column per page, 21 lines per page. The text is divided according to the chapters (known as κεφαλαια / kephalaia), whose numbers are given in the margin, and their titles (known as τιτλοι / titloi) written at the top of the pages in red ink. There is also another division according to the smaller Ammonian Sections, with references to the Eusebian Canons (both early divisions of the New Testament gospels into sections). It contains prolegomena (introductions), the table of contents (also known as κεφαλαια) before each book, and subscriptions at the end of each book, with numbers of lines in each gospel (known as στιχοι / stichoi).

Book Order

- Gospels
- Pauline Epistles
- Acts
- General Epistles

(James, Jude, 1 Peter, 2 Peter, 1 John, 2 John, 3 John) (Note: The order of General epistles is the same as in Minuscule 326.)

- Revelation.

== Text ==
The Greek text of the Gospels and Acts is considered to be a representative of the Byzantine text-type. Biblical scholar Kurt Aland placed it in Category V of his New Testament manuscripts classification system. In the Pauline epistles and General epistles its text is mixed, and Aland placed it in Category III. Category III manuscripts are described as having "a small but not a negligible proportion of early readings, with a considerable encroachment of [Byzantine] readings, and significant readings from other sources as yet unidentified." In the Book of Revelation its text belongs to the Byzantine text-type but with a large number of unique textual variants, in a close relationship to Uncial 046, and Minuscule 69. In the Gospels it is close to the manuscripts 56, 58, and in the Acts and Epistles to 326. Marginal readings in the first hand of Revelation are clearly derived from the 1516 edition of Erasmus. It was not examined by the Claremont Profile Method.

In 1 John 5:6 it has textual variant δι' ὕδατος καὶ αἵματος καὶ πνεύματος ἁγίου (through water and blood and the Holy Spirit) together with the manuscripts: 39, 326, 1837. (Note: For other variants of this verse see: Textual variants in the First Epistle of John.) Biblical scholar Bart D. Ehrman identified this reading as an Orthodox corrupt reading.

It contains a late-Vulgate-based version of the Comma Johanneum as an integral part of the text. An engraved facsimile of the relevant page can be seen in Thomas Hartwell Horne, An Introduction to the Critical Study and Knowledge of the Holy Scriptures (London: Cadell and Davies, 1818), vol. 2.2, p. 118.

== History ==
It was the first Greek manuscript discovered to contain any version of the Comma Johanneum in 1 John chapter 5. It was copied from an earlier manuscript that did not have the Comma. The Comma was translated from the Latin. Its earliest known owner was Froy, a Franciscan friar, then Thomas Clement (died 1569), then William Chark (died 1582), then Thomas Montfort (from whom it derives its present name), then Archbishop Ussher, who caused the collation to be made which appears in Bishop Brian Walton's Polyglott (Matthew 1:1; Acts 22:29; Romans 1), and presented the manuscript to Trinity College.

It is claimed that Erasmus cited this manuscript (called by him as Codex Britannicus) as his source for his (slightly modified) Comma in his third edition of Novum Testamentum (1522). Despite this being a commonly accepted fact in modern scholarship, some people in the past such as Thomas Burgess (1756 – 19 February 1837) have disputed the identification of Erasmus' "Codex Britannicus" as the same manuscript as the Codex Montfortianus, instead proposing that it is a now lost Greek manuscript due to Erasmus citing the manuscript as containing 1 John 5:7-8 without ἅγιον after πνεῦμα, which Codex Montfortianus does have, without οἱ before μαρτυροῦντες in verse 8, which Montfortianus also has and verse 8 containing καὶ οἱ τρεῖς εἰς τὸ ἕν εἰσιν which Montfortianus doesn't contain.

In the wake of publishing his first two editions of his Novum Testamentum, Erasmus received backlash from two men in particular Edward Lee, who would become Archbishop of York, and also by Stunica, editor of the Complutensian Polyglot Bible. They particularly objected to exclusion of the Comma. There is a legend that Erasmus responded that, if even one Greek text with the Comma were discovered, he would include it in his next edition. At this point Codex Montfortianus was provided to him, possibly forged for that express purpose. However, no known account included this before 1818.

The manuscript was described by textual critic Johann Jakob Wettstein, and Orlando Dobbin. Biblical scholar Caspar René Gregory saw it in 1883. The codex now is located at Trinity College (shelf number Ms. 30) in Dublin.

== See also ==
- Minuscule 62
- Minuscule 60
- List of New Testament minuscules
- Textus Receptus
- Textual criticism
