= Minuscule 45 =

- New Testament manuscript
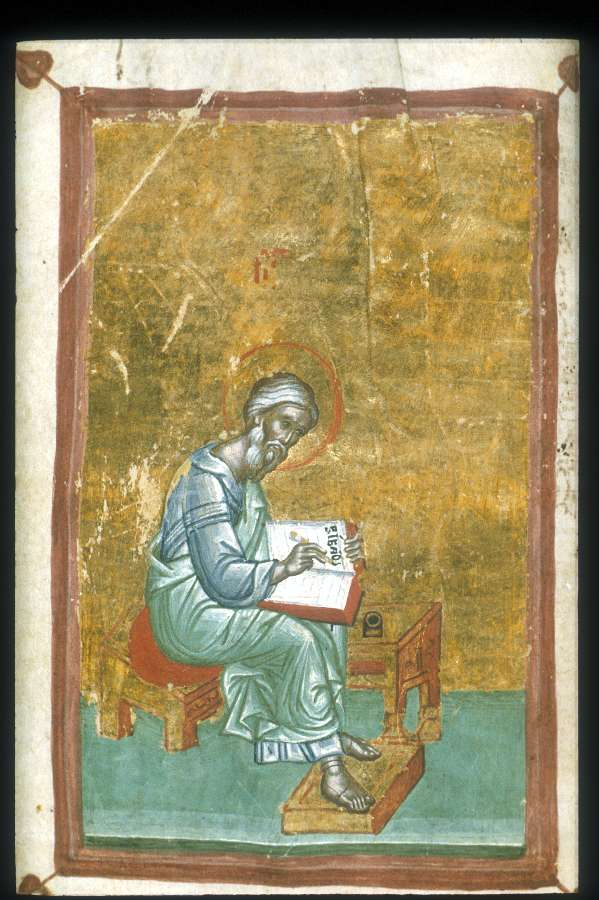
- Portrait of Matthew Evangelist on folio 6 verso
- Text: Gospels †
- Date: 13th century
- Script: Greek
- Found: 1760-1770, Athos
- Now at: Bodleian Library
- Size: 18.5 cm by 13.5 cm
- Type: Byzantine text-type
- Category: V
- Note: marginalia

Minuscule 45 (in the Gregory-Aland numbering), ε 442 (Von Soden), is a Greek minuscule manuscript of the New Testament, on parchment leaves. Palaeographically it has been assigned to the 13th century. It has complex contents and full marginalia.

== Description ==
The codex contains the text of the four Gospels on 398 leaves (size 18.5 cm by 13.5 cm) with only one lacunae (Mark 2:5-15). The text is written in one column per page, 19-21 lines per page in very neat minuscule letters. The initial letters in gold or red.

The text is divided according to the κεφαλαια (chapters), whose numbers are given at the margin, with occasional τιτλοι (titles) at the top of the pages. There is also another division according to the smaller Ammonian Sections (in Matthew 355, Mark 233 – 16:8; Luke 342, John 230 sections), with references to the Eusebian Canons.

The codex contains the Eusebian Canon tables at the beginning, tables of the κεφαλαια (tables of contents) precede each Gospel, lectionary markings at the margin (for liturgical use), subscriptions at the end of each Gospel, numbers of στιχοι in the Gospel of Luke, and pictures.

== Text ==
The Greek text of the codex is a representative of the Byzantine text-type. Hermann von Soden included it to the textual family K^{x}. Kurt and Barbara Aland placed it in Category V. According to the Claremont Profile Method it represents the textual family K^{x} in Luke 1 and Luke 20. In Luke 10 no profile was made.

== History ==
The manuscript was dated by Gregory to the 14th century. Currently it has been assigned by the INTF to the 13th century.

The codex was brought from Athos to England by César de Missy (1703-1775), French chaplain of George III, King of England, who spent his life in collecting materials for an edition of the New Testament. It was examined by Mill (Bodl. 1), Griesbach, and Wetstein in 1746.

It was added to the list of the New Testament manuscripts by Wettstein. C. R. Gregory saw it in 1883.

It is currently housed in at the Bodleian Library (Barocci 31), at Oxford.

== See also ==
- List of New Testament minuscules
- Biblical manuscript
- Textual criticism
