= Minuscule 86 =

- New Testament manuscript
- Name: Codex Posoniensis Lacaei
- Text: Gospels
- Date: 11th/12th century
- Script: Greek
- Now at: Slovak Academy of Sciences
- Size: 24 cm by 18 cm
- Type: ?
- Category: none

Minuscule 86 (in the Gregory-Aland numbering), ε 1030 (Soden), is a Greek minuscule manuscript of the New Testament, on parchment leaves. Palaeographically it has been assigned to the 11th or 12th century.

== Description ==
The codex contains the text of the four Gospels, on 281 leaves (size 24 cm by 18 cm). The text is written in one column per page, 22-23 lines per page.

It contains Prolegomena, the Eusebian Canon tables at the beginning, synaxaria, and pictures.

The Greek text of the codex Kurt Aland did not place in any Category. Wisse did not make a Profile for this manuscript.

== History ==
The manuscript once was in Buda. It was bought by priest Micheal at Constantinople in 1183 for the Emperor Alexius II Commenus. It belonged to the library in Buda. In 1699 it was purchased by Carl Rayger. Since 1722 it was held at the Lycaeum at Pressburg. It was examined by Bengel (codex Byzantinus) and Endlicher.

It is currently housed in at the Slovenská akadémia vied (394 kt), at Bratislava.

== See also ==
- List of New Testament minuscules
- Biblical manuscript
- Textual criticism
