= Minuscule 48 =

- New Testament manuscript
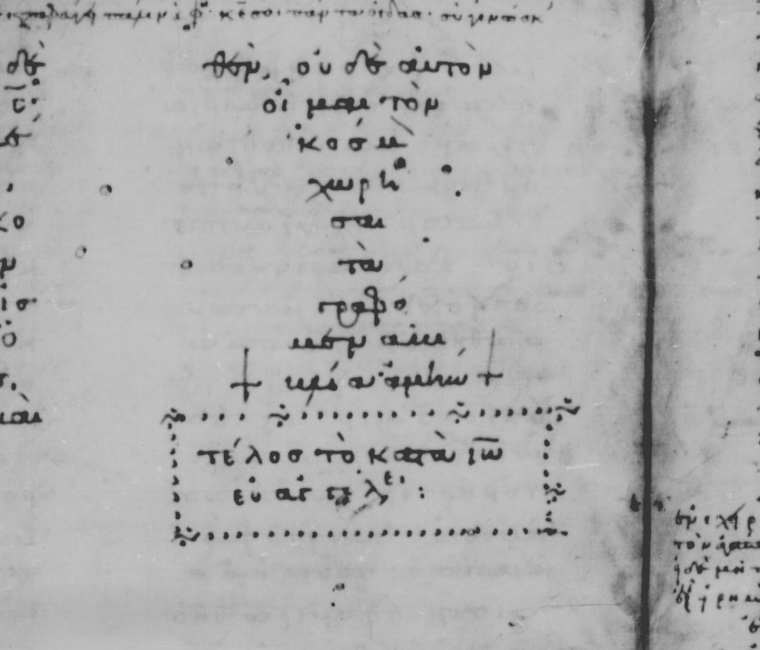
- Text: Gospels
- Date: 12th century
- Script: Greek
- Now at: Bodleian Library
- Size: 28.5 cm by 22.5 cm
- Type: ?
- Category: none
- Note: marginalia

Minuscule 48 is a Greek minuscule manuscript of the New Testament, made of parchment. It is designated by the siglum 48 in the Gregory-Aland numbering of New Testament manuscripts, and as A^{232} in the von Soden numbering of New Testament manuscripts. Using the study of comparative writing styles (palaeography), it has been assigned to the 12th century. It has complex contents with some marginal notes.

== Description ==
The manuscript is a codex (precursor to the modern book format), containing the complete text of the four Gospels written on 145 leaves (sized 28.5 cm by 22.5 cm) with a commentary. The text is written in two columns per page, 30 lines per page.

The text is divided according to the chapters (known as κεφαλαια / kephalaia), whose numbers are given in the margin. It contains the Eusebian Canon tables at the beginning written in blue, red, green, and gold ink, which were possibly added later in the 13th century.

It includes subscriptions at the end of the Gospels, with the numbers of phrases (known as ρηματα / rhemata), and numbers of lines (known as στιχοι / stichoi) written at the end of each Gospel, with some marginal notes added by the first scribe, scholia from the later hand, and pictures. The pictures are portraits of the four evangelists, likely added in the 15th or 16th century. Headpieces and titles have been written in gold ink.

It appears that two copyists worked on adding the surrounding catena, with one working on Matthew and John, the other on Mark and Luke. The copyist who added the catena in Matthew and Mark also added the chapter titles in the top margin.

== Text ==
Biblical scholar Kurt Aland did not place the Greek text of this codex in any Category of his New Testament manuscript classification system. It was not examined by using the Claremont Profile Method (a specific analysis of textual data). Accordingly the textual character of the codex is unknown.

== History ==
The earliest history of the manuscript is unknown. It was apparently acquired by diplomat and scholar Sir Thomas Bodley (d. 1613) sometime during 1605-1611. It was used by biblical scholar John Mill for his edition of the Greek New Testament (noted as Bodl. 7). It was added to the list of New Testament manuscripts by textual critic Johann J. Wettstein. Biblical scholar Caspar René Gregory saw it in 1883.

Biblical scholar Johann M. A Scholz dated the manuscript to the 13th century, but it was dated by Gregory to the 12th century. It is currently assigned by the INTF to the 12th century. It is presently housed at the Bodleian Library (shelf number MS. Auct.D.2.17), in Oxford.

In 2025, the CSNTM sponsored the digitisation of this manuscript along with several others at the Bodleian Library. Both the Bodleian Library and the CSNTM have the Digital Colour Images up on their respective websites.

== See also ==
- List of New Testament minuscules
- Biblical manuscript
- Textual criticism
