= Minuscule 83 =

- New Testament manuscript
- Name: Codex Monacensis 518
- Text: Gospels
- Date: 11th century
- Script: Greek
- Now at: Bavarian State Library
- Size: 21.4 cm by 16.6 cm
- Type: Byzantine text-type
- Category: V
- Hand: beautifully written
- Note: member of K^{r} marginalia

Minuscule 83 (in the Gregory-Aland numbering), ε 1218 (Soden), is a Greek minuscule manuscript of the New Testament, on parchment leaves. Palaeographically it has been assigned to the 11th century. It was adapted for liturgical use. It has marginalia.

== Description ==
The codex contains the complete text of the four Gospels, with a commentary, on 321 leaves (size 21.4 cm by 16.5 cm). The text is written stichometrically in one column per page, 20-21 lines per page (size of text 13.6 by 9.5 cm), in beautiful letters.

The text is divided according to the κεφαλαια (chapters), whose numbers are given at the margin, but there is no τιτλοι.

It contains prolegomena, lists of the κεφαλαια (lists of contents) before every Gospel, lectionary markings at the margin (for liturgical use), αναγνωσεις (lessons), synaxaria, Menologion, subscriptions at the end of each Gospel, and numbers of στιχοι.

The passage of John 7:53-8:11 is marked with an obelus (÷).

== Text ==
The Greek text of the codex is a representative of the Byzantine text-type. Aland placed it in Category V. Hermann von Soden classified it to the textual family K^{r}. According to the Claremont Profile Method it belongs to the textual family K^{r} in Luke 1, 10, and 20.

== History ==
Formerly the manuscript was held in Augsburg (as codices 84 and 85). It was examined by Bengel (as August 1), Scholz, and Burgon. C. R. Gregory saw it in 1887.

It is currently housed in at the Bavarian State Library (Gr. 518), at Munich.

== See also ==
- List of New Testament minuscules
- Biblical manuscript
- Textual criticism
