= Minuscule 79 =

- New Testament manuscript
- Name: Codex Georg Douzae
- Text: Gospels
- Date: 15th century
- Script: Greek-Latin
- Found: 1597, Georg Douza
- Now at: Leiden University Library
- Size: 16.5 cm by 12 cm
- Type: Byzantine/mixed
- Category: none

Minuscule 79, known as Codex Georg Douzae, is a Greek-Latin minuscule manuscript of the New Testament Gospels, on parchment. It is designated by the siglum 71. in the Gregory-Aland numbering of New Testament manuscripts, and ε 529 in the von Soden numbering of New Testament manuscripts. Using the study of comparative writing styles (palaeography), it has been assigned to the 14th century. It was adapted for liturgical use.

== Description ==
The manuscript is a codex (precursor to the modern book format), containing an almost complete the text of the four Gospels with one large gap (Matthew 1:1-14:13), written on 208 parchment leaves (sized 16.5 cm by 12 cm). The text is written in two columns per page, 26-28 lines per page. The initial letters are written in red ink.

In the Gospel of Matthew it contains chapter numbers (known as κεφαλαια / kephalai) written in the margin, though none of the chapter titles (known as τιτλοι / titloi) are included, with lectionary markings in the margin (for liturgical use), incipits, an introduction (αναγνωσεις / anagnoseis) to Matthew, a synaxaria (list of weekly readings), and pictures.

== Text ==
The Greek text of the codex is considered to be mostly a representative of the Byzantine text-type, with several non-majority readings. Biblical scholar Kurt Aland did not place it in any Category of his New Testament Manuscript Classification system.

According to the Claremont Profile Method (a specific analysis of textual data), it represents textual family K^{x} in Luke 1. In Luke 10 and Luke 20 it has a mixed text.

== History ==
The earliest history of the manuscript is unknown. Georg Douza brought the manuscript from Constantinople in 1597. It was cited by Frans Comer von Brügge.

It is currently dated by the INTF to the 14th century. It is presently housed in at the Leiden University Library (B. P. Gr. 74), at Leiden.

== See also ==
- List of New Testament minuscules
- Biblical manuscript
- Textual criticism
