= Minuscule 41 =

- New Testament manuscript
- Text: Matthew, Mark †
- Date: 11th century
- Script: Greek
- Now at: Bibliothèque nationale de France
- Size: 30.7 cm by 23.6 cm
- Type: Byzantine text-type
- Category: none
- Note: marginalia

Minuscule 41 (in the Gregory-Aland numbering), is a Greek minuscule manuscript of the New Testament on parchment. Palaeographically it has been assigned to the 11th century. It has marginalia.

== Description ==
The codex contains the text of the Gospels Matthew and Mark, on 224 parchment leaves (30.7 cm by 23.6 cm), with some lacunae. About 30 leaves lost. The large initial letters in red.

The text is written stichometrically in one column per page, 31 lines per page. The biblical text of Matthew and Mark is surrounded by a catena (in Mark commentary of Victorinus).

The text is divided according to the κεφαλαια (chapters), whose numbers are given at the margin, and their τιτλοι (titles of chapters) at the top.

It contains table of the κεφαλαια (table of contents) (only in Mark), lectionary markings at the margin (for liturgical use), and subscriptions at the end of each Gospel, with numbers of στιχοι.

== Text ==
Kurt Aland the Greek text of the codex did not place in any Category.

== History ==
The manuscript was dated by Gregory to the 11th century. Currently it has been assigned by the INTF to the 11th century.

The manuscript was examined and described by Montfaucon, Wettstein, Scholz, and Paulin Martin.

It was added to the list of the New Testament manuscripts by Wettstein. C. R. Gregory saw the manuscript in 1885.

It is currently housed at the Bibliothèque nationale de France (Coislin Gr. 24) at Paris.

== See also ==
- List of New Testament minuscules
- Biblical manuscript
- Textual criticism
- Minuscule 40
