= Minuscule 19 =

- New Testament manuscript
- Text: Gospels
- Date: 12th-century
- Script: Greek
- Now at: National Library of France
- Size: 32 cm by 23.6 cm
- Type: mixed
- Category: none
- Hand: beautifully written
- Note: marginalia

Minuscule 19 (in the Gregory-Aland numbering), A^{214} (Von Soden). It is a Greek minuscule manuscript of the New Testament, on 387 parchment leaves, dated palaeographically to the 12th-century. It has complex contents and marginalia.

== Description ==
The codex contains a complete text of the four Gospels on 387 thick parchment leaves (32 cm by 23.6 cm). The order of books is unusual: John, Matthew, Luke, and Mark. The same order appears in Minuscule 427, 734, Tertullian, and Chrysostom.

The biblical text is surrounded by a catena. In Mark it has Victor's commentary, in John Chrysostomos's commentary. The large initial letters are in red.

The text is divided according to the κεφαλαια (chapters), whose numerals are given at the margin, with the τιτλοι (titles of chapters) at the top and foot of the pages (with the harmony). There is also a division according to the smaller Ammonian Sections, with references to the Eusebian Canons.

It contains tables of the κεφαλαια (tables of contents) before each Gospel, and subscriptions at the end of each Gospel.

It has the commentary of Victor in Mark, catena of Chrysostomos in John, and scholia to the other Gospels.

== Text ==
Kurt Aland did not place the Greek text of the codex in any Category.

It was not examined by using the Claremont Profile Method.

== History ==
The manuscript is dated by the INTF to the 12th-century.

Formerly the codex was in the hands of Catherine de' Medici. It was added to the list of the New Testament manuscripts by Wettstein (19). It was examined by Scholz. C. R. Gregory saw the manuscript in 1885.

It is currently housed at the Bibliothèque nationale de France (Gr. 189) at Paris.

== See also ==
- Minuscule 20
- Minuscule 18
- List of New Testament minuscules
- Textual criticism
