= Minuscule 24 =

- New Testament manuscript
- Text: Matthew-Mark†
- Date: 10th-century
- Script: Greek
- Now at: National Library of France
- Size: 15.2 x 7.7 cm
- Type: Byzantine text-type
- Category: V
- Note: marginalia

Minuscule 24 (in the Gregory-Aland numbering), A^{18} (von Soden). It is a Greek minuscule manuscript of the New Testament, written on vellum. Palaeographically it has been assigned to the 10th-century. It has marginalia.

== Description ==
The codex contains the text of the Gospel of Matthew and Mark on 240 parchment leaves, with lacuna in Matthew 27:20-Mark 4:22. The text is written in one column per page, the biblical text in 25 lines and text of commentary in 58 lines per page. The initial letters in red, the ink is brown.

The biblical text in Gospel of Mark is surrounded by a catena, in Mark of authorship of Victorinus.

The text is divided according to the κεφαλαια (chapters), whose numbers are given at the margin, and the τιτλοι (titles of chapters) at the top of the pages. There is also a division according to the Ammonian Sections (in Mark 234 sections, the last section in 16:9), with references to the Eusebian Canons (written below Ammonian Section numbers).

It contains Prolegomena, table of the κεφαλαια (table of contents) precedes Gospel of Mark. The later hand added Synaxarion (liturgical book with hagiography).

== Text ==
The Greek text of the codex is a representative of the Byzantine text-type. Aland placed it in Category V.

== History ==
It is dated by the INTF to the 10th-century.

The manuscript was examined and described by Griesbach, Scholz, Cramer (Catena for Mark), Henri Omont, and Paulin Martin. C. R. Gregory saw the manuscript in 1885.

It was added to the list of the New Testament manuscripts by Johann Jakob Wettstein, who gave it the number 24.

It is currently housed at the Bibliothèque nationale de France (Gr. 178) at Paris.

== See also ==
- Minuscule 25
- Minuscule 23
- List of New Testament minuscules
- Textual criticism
