= Minuscule 58 =

- New Testament manuscript
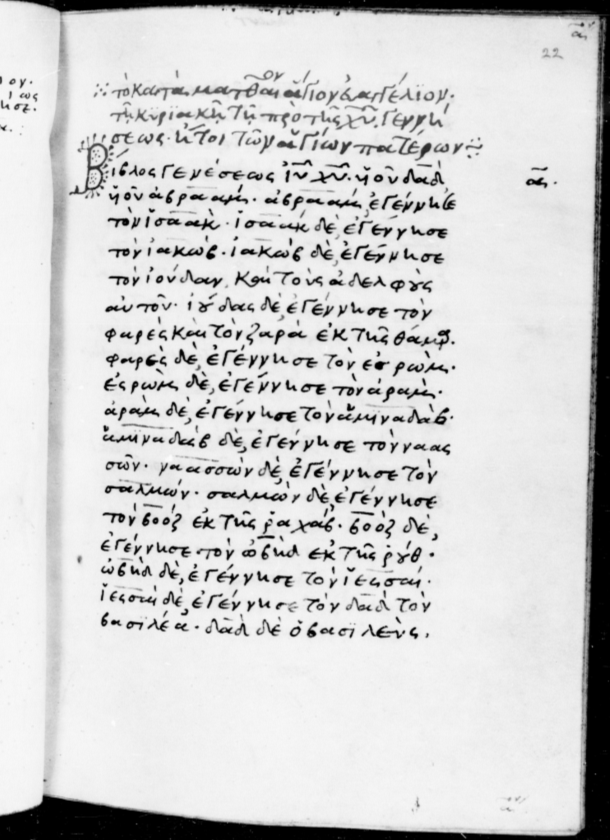
- Text: Gospels
- Date: 15th century
- Script: Greek
- Now at: New College
- Size: 19.8 cm by 14.5 cm
- Type: Byzantine text-type
- Category: V
- Hand: carelessly written
- Note: member of the family K^{r}

Minuscule 58 (in the Gregory-Aland numbering), ε 518 (Von Soden), is a Greek minuscule manuscript of the New Testament, on parchment leaves. Palaeographically it has been assigned to the 15th century. The manuscript has complex contents. It has marginalia.

== Description ==
The codex contains complete text of the four Gospels on 342 leaves (size 19.8 cm by 14.5 cm). The text is written in one column per page, with 20-21 lines per page. The name of scribe is Joannes Serbopulos. According to Scrivener it is carelessly written.

The text is divided according to the κεφαλαια (chapters), whose numbers are given at the margin (also in Latin), and their τιτλοι (titles) at the top of the pages. There is also another division according to the Ammonian Sections, but this system is used only partially.

It contains prolegomena, lists of the κεφαλαια (tables of contents) before each Gospel, αναγνωσεις (lessons) at the margin, synaxaria, and subscriptions (only in Mark).

== Text ==
The Greek text of the codex is a representative of the Byzantine text-type. Hermann von Soden classified it to the textual family K^{x}. Aland placed it in Category V. According to the Claremont Profile Method it represents K^{r} text in Luke 1, Luke 10, and Luke 20. It creates a textual cluster with 56.

C. R. Gregory noticed that it is close to the manuscripts Minuscule 47, 54, 56, 61.

== History ==
The manuscript was written by John Serbopoulos (possibly copied from 54). It once belonged to John Hopkins from Lincoln.

Ussher collated it for Walton's Polyglotte. It was examined by Mill (Nov. coll. 1), Wettstein in 1715, Dobbin, and C. R. Gregory (in 1883). Dobbin compared its readings with Codex Montfortianus and 56 in 1922 places. Gregory expressed the opinion that codices 47, 56, 58 are in the same hand, and one of them copied from 54.

It is currently housed in at the New College (68), at Oxford.

== See also ==
- List of New Testament minuscules
- Biblical manuscript
- Textual criticism
