= Minuscule 47 =

- New Testament manuscript
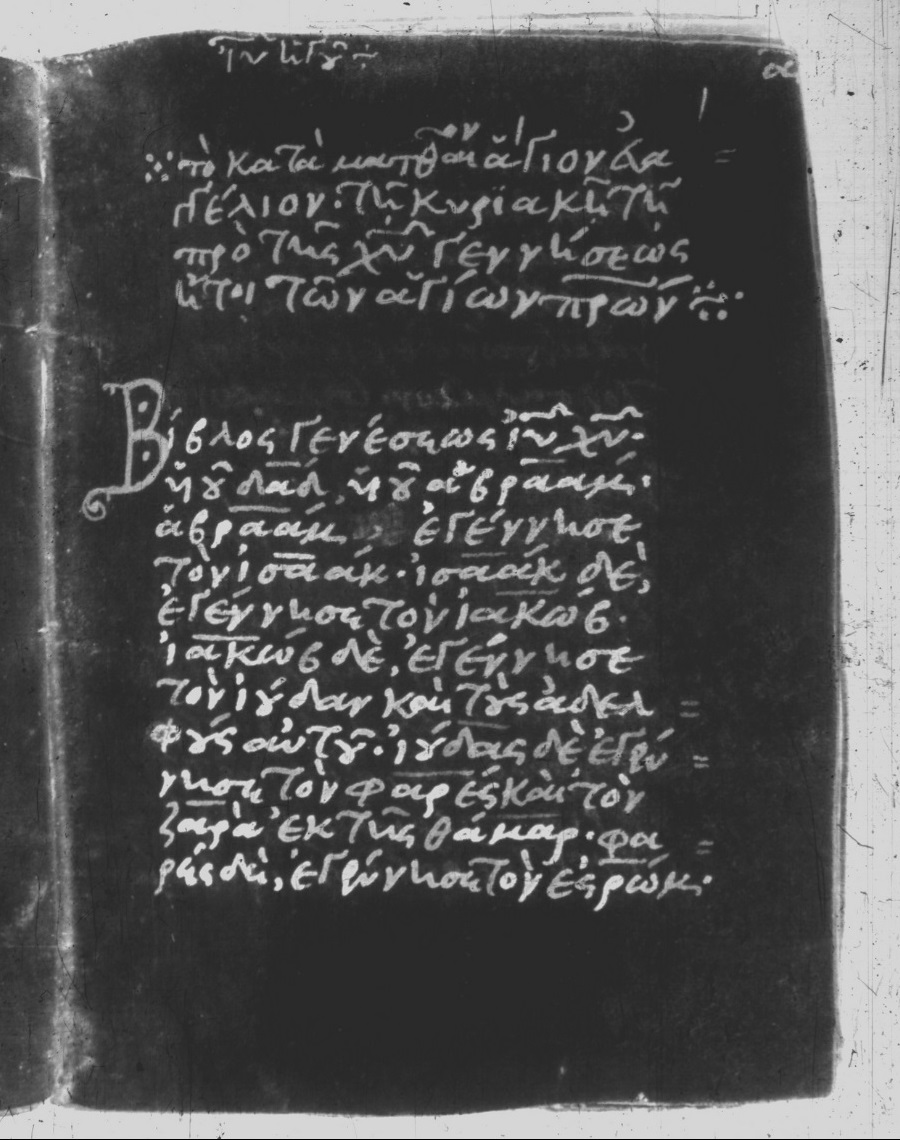
- Text: Gospels
- Date: 15th century
- Script: Greek
- Now at: Bodleian Library
- Size: 12 cm by 19 cm
- Type: Byzantine text-type
- Category: V
- Hand: a vile hand
- Note: member of the K^{r} group marginalia

Minuscule 47 (in the Gregory-Aland numbering), ε 515 (Von Soden), is a Greek minuscule manuscript of the New Testament, on parchment leaves. Palaeographically it has been assigned to the 15th century. It has complex contents and some marginalia.

== Description ==
The codex contains the complete text of the four Gospels on 554 leaves (size 12 cm by 19 cm). The text is written in one column per page, 14-17 lines per page. The leaves are often dislocated. According to Scrivener it was written in "a vile hand".

The text is divided according to the κεφαλαια (chapters), whose numbers are given at the margin (also in Latin), and their τιτλοι (titles) at the top of the pages.

It contains Prolegomena, Argumentum, lists of the κεφαλαια (tables of contents) before each Gospel, subscriptions at the end of each Gospels, with numbers of στιχοι (only in Mark).

== Text ==
The Greek text of the codex is a representative of the Byzantine text-type. Hermann von Soden classified it to the textual family K^{x}. Aland placed it in Category V. According to the Claremont Profile Method it represents mixed text in Luke 1. In Luke 10 and Luke 20 it belongs to the textual family Family K^{r}.

In John 8:2-3 it reads και καθισας εδιδασκεν αυτους εν τισιν αντιγραφαις οθτως αγουσι δε οι γραμματεις.

In John 8:6 it has textual reading και προσποιουμενος.

== History ==
The manuscript was dated by Gregory to the 15th century. Currently it has been assigned by the INTF to the 15th century.

The manuscript was written by a scribe Joannes Serbopoulos (or Zerbopoulos) along with manuscripts minuscule 56 and minuscule 58. It was used in Walton's Polyglotte (as Bodl. 1). It was examined by Mill (as Bodl. 6).

It was added to the list of the New Testament manuscripts by J. J. Wettstein. C. R. Gregory saw it in 1883.

It is currently housed in at the Bodleian Library (MS. Auct.D.5.2), at Oxford.

== See also ==
- List of New Testament minuscules
- Biblical manuscript
- Textual criticism
