= Minuscule 25 =

- New Testament manuscript
- Text: Gospels
- Date: 11th-century
- Script: Greek
- Now at: National Library of France
- Size: 30.2 cm by 23.2 cm
- Type: Byzantine text-type
- Category: V
- Note: incomplete marginalia

Minuscule 25 is a Greek minuscule manuscript of the New Testament, written on vellum. It is designated by the siglum 25 in the Gregory-Aland numbering of New Testament manuscripts, and as A^{139} in the von Soden numbering of New Testament manuscripts. Using the study of comparative writing styles (palaeography), it has been assigned to the 11th-century. It has incomplete marginal notation, and was adapted for liturgical use.

== Description ==
The manuscript is a codex (precursor to the modern book format), containing the text of the four Gospels on 292 thick parchment leaves (sized 30.2 cm by 23.2 cm), with considerable missing portions. The text is written in one column per page, 13 lines per page, with the surrounding commentary in 42 lines per page, in brown ink. The capital letters are in red ink.

The text is divided according to the chapters (known as κεφαλαια / kephalaia), whose numbers are given in the margin, and their titles (known as τιτλοι / titloi) written at the top of the pages. There is no other division according to the Ammonian Sections or to the Eusebian Canons (both early divisions of the Gospels into sections, which are usually included in later manuscripts of the New Testament Gospels).

It contains a Prolegomena, the chapter lists (also known as κεφαλαια) before each of the Gospels, lectionary markings in the margin for liturgical use (partially), and a commentary surrounding the Biblical text (the commentary in Mark is from the writings of Victorinus of Pettau). BIblical scholar Frederick H. A. Scrivener described the manuscript as "grandly written, but very imperfect".

Missing sections: Matthew Mt 1:1-4:25; 23:1-25:42; 26:43-55; 28:10-20; Luke 20:19-22:46; John 12:40-13:1; 15:24-16:12; 18:16-28; 20:19-21:19-25.

It has errors by iota subscriptum.

== Text ==
The Greek text of the codex is considered to be a representative of the Byzantine text-type. Biblical scholar Kurt Aland placed it in Category V of his New Testament manuscript classification system. It was not examined by the Claremont Profile Method (a specific analysis of textual data).

== History ==
The manuscript was added to the list of the New Testament manuscripts by textual critic Johann Jakob Wettstein, who gave it the number 25. It was examined and described by textual critics Johann J. Griesbach, Johann M. A. Scholz, and Paulin Martin. C. R. Gregory saw the manuscript in 1885.

The manuscript is dated by the INTF to the 11th-century. It is currently housed at the Bibliothèque nationale de France (Gr. 191) in Paris.

== See also ==
- Minuscule 26
- Minuscule 24
- List of New Testament minuscules
- Textual criticism
