= Minuscule 52 =

- New Testament manuscript
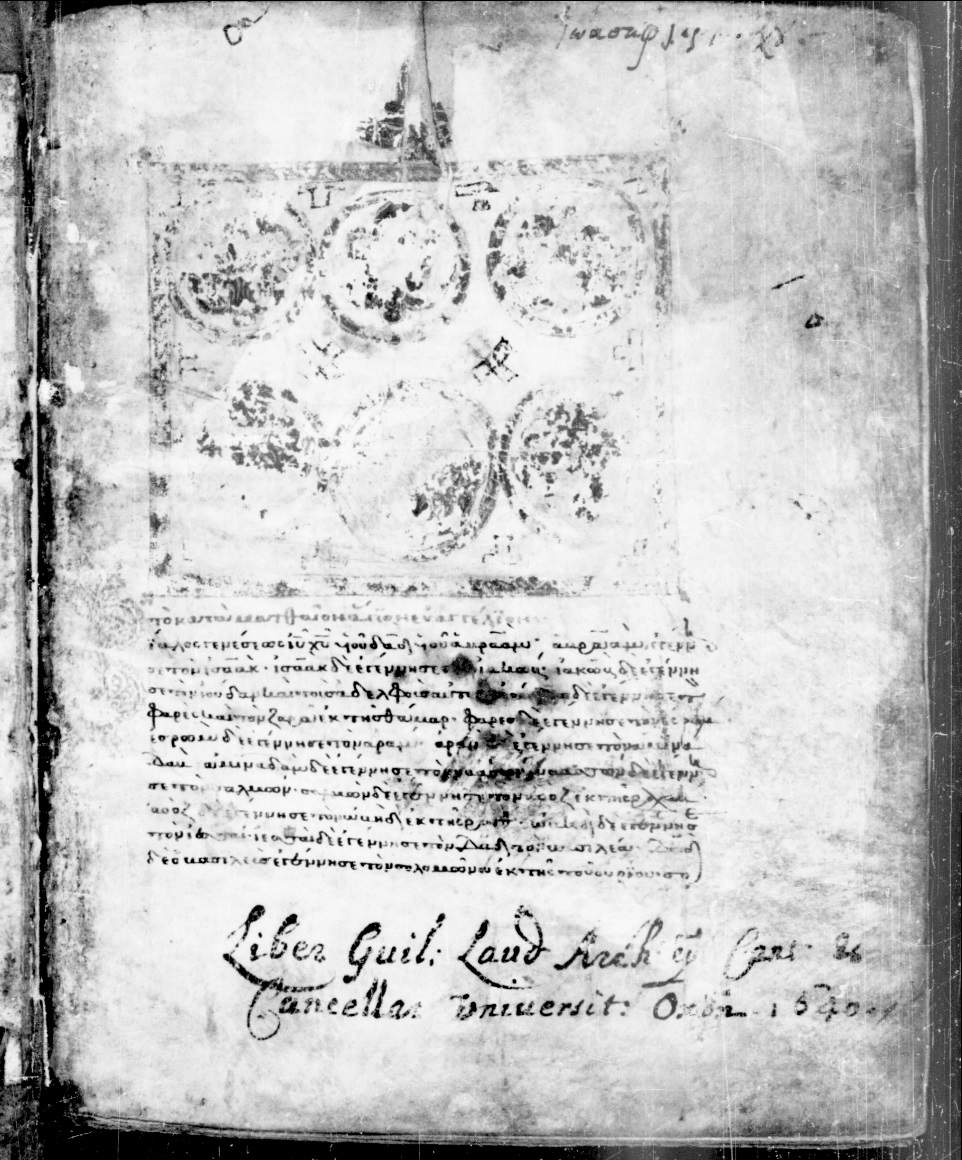
- Text: Gospels
- Date: 1285/1286
- Script: Greek
- Now at: Bodleian Library
- Size: 16.5 cm by 12.5 cm
- Type: Byzantine text-type
- Category: V
- Hand: elegant small letters
- Note: full marginalia

Minuscule 52 (in the Gregory-Aland numbering), ε 345 (Von Soden), is a Greek minuscule manuscript of the New Testament, on parchment leaves. The codex was written in 1285 or 1286. It has complex contents and full marginalia.

== Description ==
The codex contains complete text of the four Gospels on 158 leaves (size 16.5 cm by 12.5 cm). The text is written in one column per page, 27-30 lines per page, in an elegant small minuscule letters. The large initial letters in red.

The text is divided according to the κεφαλαια (chapters), whose numbers are given at the margin. There is also another division according to the smaller Ammonian Sections, with references to the Eusebian Canons.

It contains Prolegomena, lectionary markings at the margin (for liturgical use), pictures, menaion, and subscriptions at the end of the Gospels.

== Text ==
The Greek text of the codex is a representative of the Byzantine text-type. Kurt Aland placed it in Category V. According to the Claremont Profile Method it represents K^{x} text in Luke 1 and Luke 20. In Luke 10 no profile was made. It creates a textual cluster with Minuscule 46.

== History ==
It was written by the same scribe as minuscule 341. The manuscript once belonged to Joasaph, a monk. William Laud became its owner in 1640.

It was examined by Mill (as Laud. 5) and Griesbach.

It was added to the list of the New Testament manuscript by Wettstein. C. R. Gregory saw it in 1883.

It is currently housed in at the Bodleian Library (MS. Laud. Gr. 3), at Oxford.

== See also ==
- List of New Testament minuscules
- Biblical manuscript
- Textual criticism
