= Minuscule 56 =

- New Testament manuscript
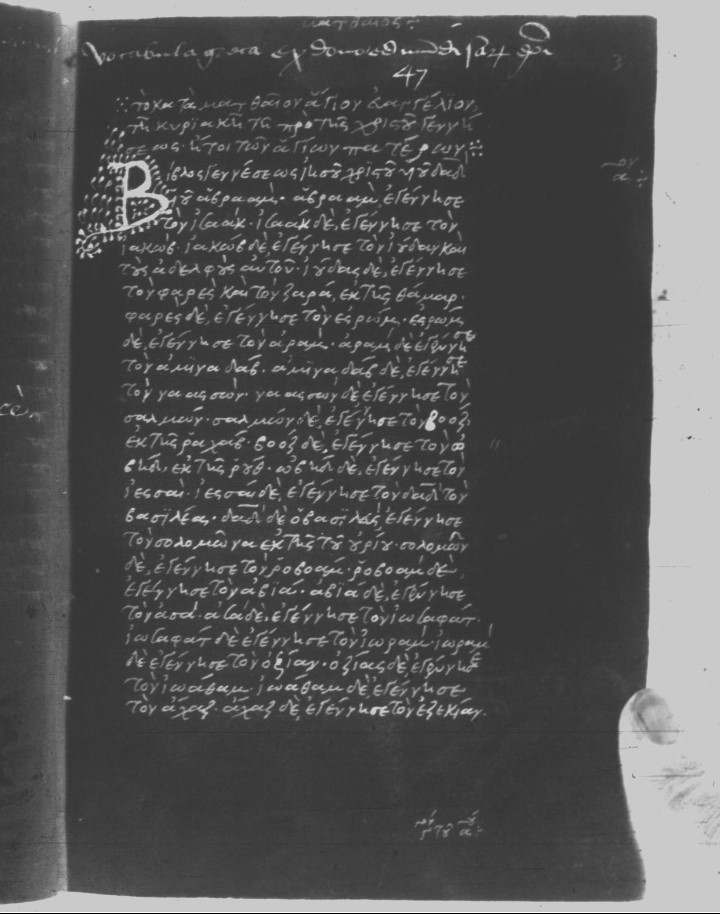
- The beginning of the Gospel of Matthew
- Text: Gospels
- Date: 15th century
- Script: Greek
- Now at: Lincoln College, Oxford
- Size: 20.5 cm by 14.5 cm
- Type: Byzantine
- Category: none
- Note: close to codex 54

Minuscule 56 (in the Gregory-Aland numbering), ε 517 (von Soden), is a Greek minuscule manuscript of the New Testament, on paper leaves. Palaeographically it has been assigned to the 15th century. The manuscript has complex contents and some marginalia.

== Description ==
The codex contains complete text of the four Gospels on 232 paper leaves (size 20.5 cm by 14.5 cm). The text is written in one column per page, 24 lines per page.

The text is divided according to the κεφαλαια (chapters), whose numbers are given at the margin (also in Latin), with some τιτλοι (titles of chapters) at the top of the pages.

It contains Prolegomena to the Gospel of Mark and Luke, lists of the κεφαλαια (tables of contents) before each Gospel, αναγνωσεις (lessons), titles to the Gospels, subscriptions at the end of each Gospel, with numbers of στιχοι (only in John), and numbered paragraphs.

== Text ==
The Greek text of the codex is a representative of the Byzantine text-type. Hermann von Soden classified it to the textual family K^{x}. Aland did not assign it to any Category of New Testament manuscripts. According to the Claremont Profile Method it represents the textual family K^{r} in Luke 1, Luke 10, and Luke 20. It creates a textual cluster with 58. This means it has a Byzantine text.

The text contains some various readings. According to C. R. Gregory it is a sister or daughter of the codex 54.

In John 8:6 it has textual reading και προσποιουμενος.

== History ==
The manuscript was written by John Serbopoulos in England. In 1502 it was presented to the Lincoln College by Edmund Audley, Bishop of Salisbury, where it is still housed, under shelf number Gr. 18, at Oxford.

Walton gave some various readings. It was examined by Mill (Lincoln 1), Orlando T. Dobbin, and Scrivener. Dobbin compared its readings with Codex Montfortianus and 58 in 1922 places. Pascoe detected 34 omissions for four chapters. C. R. Gregory saw it in 1883.

== See also ==
- List of New Testament minuscules
- Biblical manuscript
- Textual criticism
