= Minuscule 62 =

- New Testament manuscript
- Text: Acts, Pauline epistles †
- Date: 14th century
- Script: Greek
- Now at: Bibliothèque nationale de France
- Size: 34.3 cm by 23.3 cm
- Category: none
- Note: marginalia

Minuscule 62 (in the Gregory-Aland numbering), α 453 (Soden), is a Greek minuscule manuscript of the New Testament, on paper leaves. Palaeographically it has been assigned to the 14th century. Formerly it was labelled by 62^{a} and 65^{p}. It was adapted for liturgical use. The manuscript is lacunose.

== Description ==
The codex contains the text of the Acts of the Apostles, Catholic epistles, and Pauline epistles on 135 paper leaves (size 34.3 cm by 23.3 cm) with two lacunae (Acts 1:1-7:34; 13:21-25). The text is written in one column per page, 35 lines per page.

The text is divided according to the κεφαλαια (chapters), whose numbers are given at the margin, and the τιτλοι (titles) at the top of the pages.

It contains Prolegomena, tables of the κεφαλαια (tables of contents) before each book, lectionary markings at the margin (for liturgical use), Synaxarion, and subscriptions at the end of each book, with numbers of stichoi. Hebrews is placed before 1 Timothy.

== Text ==
Kurt Aland the Greek text of the codex did not place in any of his Categories.

== History ==
The manuscript came from the East. The manuscript once belonged to the Colbert's collection. It was examined by Wettstein, Griesbach, and Scholz. Formerly it was labelled by 62^{a} and 65^{p}. In 1908 Gregory gave for it number 62.

Currently it is housed at the Bibliothèque nationale de France (Gr. 60), at Paris.

== See also ==
- List of New Testament minuscules
- Biblical manuscript
- Textual criticism
