= Fonds Coislin =

Fonds Coislin (French: Le fonds Coislin) is a collection (or fonds) of Greek manuscripts acquired by Pierre Séguier, but named after Henri-Charles de Coislin, its second owner. It is now held in the National Library of France, as one of three fonds of Greek manuscripts: fonds grec, fonds Coislin, and supplément grec.

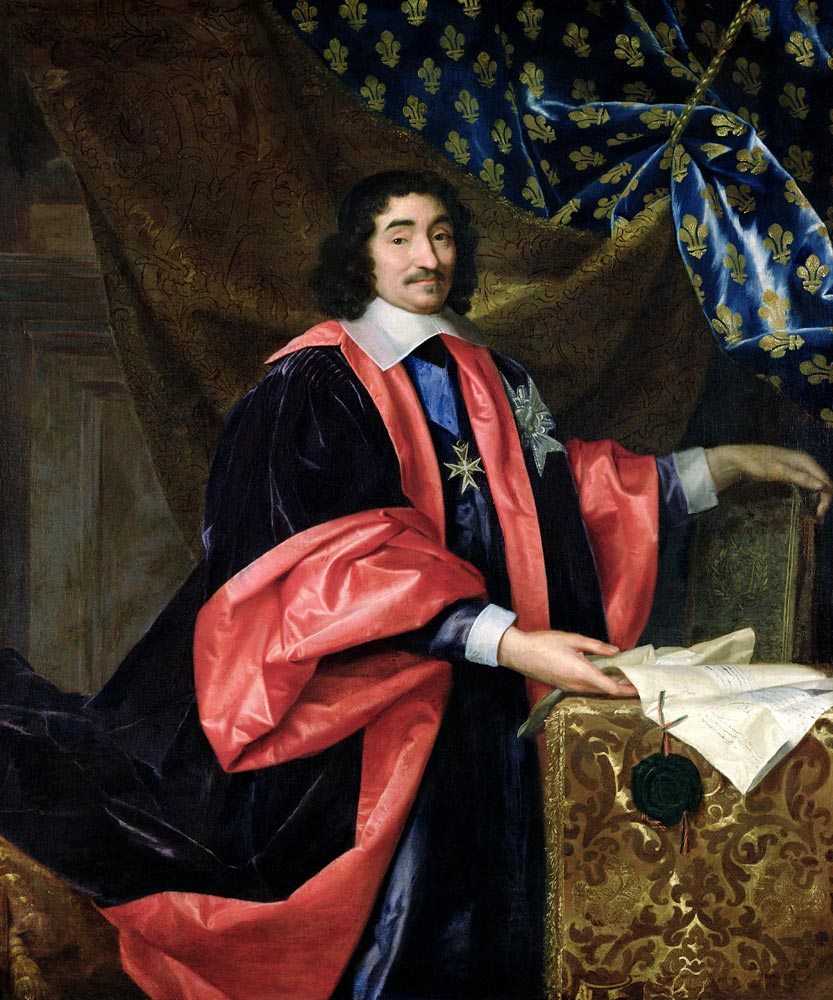
Pierre Seguier painted by Henri Testelin (ca. 1668)

== History of collection ==
The majority of these manuscripts were collected between 1643 and 1653, by Père Athanase the Rhetor, who bought them for Pierre Séguier (1588–1672), chancellor of France from 1635. Athanase bought the manuscripts in Cyprus, Constantinople, Mount Athos, and in other territories bordering the northern and western Aegean.

The collection contains almost 400 manuscripts. Athanase collected more than 300 manuscripts (probably 358) personally. After Séguier's death, all this collection was inherited by his grandson, Henri-Charles de Coislin (1664–1732), bishop of Metz. He gave it to the Benedictine monks of Saint-Germain-des-Prés in Paris.

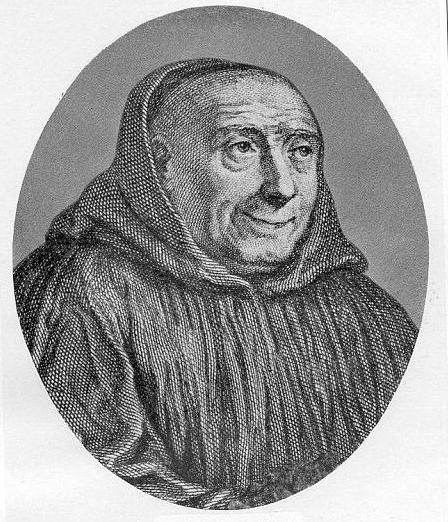
Bernard de Montfaucon

The first catalogue of this collection, the Coislin catalogue, was made in 1715, in which 42 manuscripts were described (Bernard de Montfaucon, Bibliotheca Coisliniana olim Segueriana, Paris: Ludovicus Guerin & Carolus Robustel, 1715). A large part of the collection was burned in 1793, and in 1795 Fonds Coislin was deposited in the National Library of France, where it has been held until the present day. A few manuscripts, bought by Russians during the time of Catherine II, now are held at Saint Petersburg (s.v. Dubrowski).

One of the best known manuscripts of the collection is the fragmentary uncial Codex Coislinianus. The collection also includes Minuscule 35 (Coislin 199), now considered to be one of the best witnesses of the Byzantine text-type, and the basis for The Gospel According to John in the Byzantine Tradition (Deutsche Bibelgesellschaft, Stuttgart 2007). The collection also includes further witnesses to the text of the New Testament, as well as to the Septuagint, Josephus, and other ancient, and medieval authors.

== Some manuscripts ==
- Coislinianus 20 — Gospels (Gregory-Aland 36)
- Coislinianus 24 — Gospel of Matthew and Mark (Gregory-Aland 41)
- Coislinianus 26 — Acts of Apostles, Pauline epistles (Gregory-Aland 056)
- Coislinianus 131 — part of Pseudo-Josephus report on Jesus Christus and early Christianity
- Coislinianus 149 — Diodorus Siculus
- Coislinianus 199 — (Gregory-Aland 35)
- Coislinianus 200 — Gospels (Gregory-Aland 38)
- Coislinianus 305 — Chronicon of George Hamartolus (with fragments of Papias)
- Coislinianus 311 — Alexiad
- Coislinianus 345 — Codex Unicus of the Homeric lexicographer Apollonius the Sophist
- Coislinianus 386 — On the Soul
- Coislinianus 387 — manuscript of Iliad

== Bibliography ==
- Devreesse, Robert (1945). Le Fonds Coislin, Catalogue des manuscrits grecs II. Paris.
- Laurion, Gustav (1961). "Les Principales Collections de Manuscrits Grecs". Phoenix. 15 (1): 1–13. doi:10.2307/1085930. JSTOR 1085930.
- Leeuw, Martin de (2000). "Der Coislinianus 345 im Kloster Megisti Lavra (Athos)" (PDF). Zeitschrift für Papyrologie und Epigraphik (in German). 131: 58–64.
- O'Meara, Dominic J. (1977). "The philosophical Writings, Sources and Thought of Athanasius Rhetor (ca. 1571–1663)". Proceedings of the American Philosophical Society. 121: 483–499. Abstract.
