= Minuscule 22 =

- New Testament manuscript
- Name: Codex Colbertinus, 2467
- Text: Gospels †
- Date: 12th-century
- Script: Greek
- Now at: Bibliothèque nationale de France
- Size: 26 cm by 19 cm
- Type: Caesarean text-type
- Category: none
- Hand: beautifully written
- Note: it contains remarkable readings marginalia

Minuscule 22, also known as Codex Colbertinus 2467, is a Greek minuscule manuscript of the New Testament Gospels, written on parchment. It is designated by the siglum 22 in the Gregory-Aland numbering of New Testament manuscripts, and ε 288 in the von Soden numbering of New Testament manuscripts.. Using the study of comparative handwriting styles (palaeography), it has been assigned to the 12th century. It has marginal notes, and was adapted for liturgical use.

== Description ==
The manuscript is a codex (precursor to the modern book format), containing a near complete text of the four Gospels written on 232 parchment leaves (sized 26 cm by 19 cm), with some missing portions: Matthew 1:1-2:2; 4:19-5:25; John 14:22-16:27. The text is written in one column per page, 22 lines per page (column size 17.2 cm by 12 cm), in black ink, with the initial letters written in gold ink.

The text is divided according to the chapters (known as κεφαλαια / kephalaia), whose numbers are given in the margin, and their titles (known as τιτλοι / titloi) written at the top of the pages. There is also a division according to the Ammonian Sections (355 in Mather, 233 in Mark), but with only partial reference to the Eusebian Canons (both early divisions of the Gospels into sections). The references to the Eusebian Canons are incomplete.

It contains tables of contents (also known as κεφαλαια) before each Gospel, and subscriptions at the end of each Gospel. In the 16th century lectionary markings were added in the margin (for liturgical use). The manuscript has a comment about the authenticity of Mark 16:9-20. The manuscript is free from errors of itacism and errors by "homoioteleuton" (omission of words/phrases due to similar word endings), and very carefully accentuated. Some leaves are dislocated.

== Text ==
The Greek text of the codex is considered to be of an admixture of text-types. According to biblical scholar Burnett H. Streeter, it is a representative of the Caesarean text-type, but according to biblical scholar Kurt Aland it has some of the Byzantine text-type element, though it is not a pure Byzantine manuscript. Aland did not place it in any category of his New Testament manuscript classification system. Biblical scholar David A. Black classified it as the Caesarean text. Scholar Alison Sarah Welsby has placed the manuscript in the textual family f^{1} in John, as an ancestor manuscript of Minuscule 1210.

According to the Claremont Profile Method (a specific analysis of textual data), it represents textual group 22b in Luke 1, Luke 10, and Luke 20 as a core member. Scholar Frederik Wisse listed 22, 134, 149, 351 (part), 1192, and 1210 as members of group 22b.

It has some remarkable readings. In Matthew 10:12, it reads λεγοντες ειρηνη τω οικω τουτω (say peace to be this house) after αυτην, which was deleted by the first corrector, but then restored by a second corrector. The original and restored reading is also seen in the manuscripts Codex Sinaiticus (א), Bezae (D), Regius (L), Washingtonianus (W), Koridethi (Θ), manuscripts of f ^{1}, 1010 (1424), the Vetus Latina (it), and Clementine Vulgate (vg^{cl}).

In Matthew 27:9 it has the unique textual variant ἐπληρώθη τὸ ῥηθὲν διὰ Ζαχαρίου τοῦ προφήτου (fulfilled what was spoken by Zachariah the prophet). This reading is only supported by some Syriac manuscripts. Other manuscripts usually have "Jeremiah" or omit the name of the prophet.

== History ==
THe earliest history of the manuscript is unknown. It was added to the list of the New Testament manuscripts by textual critic Johann J. Wettstein, who gave it the number 22. It was partially examined and collated by biblical scholar Johann M. A. Scholz, who checked it in only 96 verses, with scholars Scrivener and Caspar René Gregory checking it in further verses. Scholar Henry A. Sanders gave full a collation of the manuscript in 1914. It was examined and described by scholar Paulin Martin. Gregory saw the manuscript in 1885.

The manuscript was formerly assigned to the 11th-century, according to scholars Samuel P. Tregelles, and Frederick H. A.Scrivener. The manuscript is presently dated by the INTF to the 12th-century. It is currently housed at the Bibliothèque nationale de France (shelf number Gr. 72) in Paris.

== See also ==
- Minuscule 23
- Minuscule 21
- List of New Testament minuscules
- Textual criticism
- Biblical manuscript
