= Minuscule 270 =

- New Testament manuscript
- Text: Gospels
- Date: 12th century
- Script: Greek
- Now at: Bibliothèque nationale de France
- Size: 18.3 cm by 13.3 cm
- Type: Byzantine text-type
- Category: V
- Note: marginalia

Minuscule 270 is a Greek minuscule manuscript of the New Testament, made of parchment. It is designated by the siglum 270 in the Gregory-Aland numbering of New Testament manuscripts, and ε 291 in the von Soden numbering of New Testament manuscripts. Using the study of comparative writing styles (palaeography), it has been assigned to the 12th century. The manuscript has complex contents.

== Description ==
The manuscript is a codex (precursor to the modern book format), containing the complete text of the four Gospels on 346 parchment leaves (sized 18.3 cm by 13.3 cm). The text is written in one column per page, in 19 lines per page.

The text is divided according to the chapters (known as κεφαλαια / kephalaia), whose numbers are given in the margin, and their titles (known as τιτλοι / titloi) written at the top of the pages. There is also a division according to the Ammonian Sections (234 in Mark, the last in 16:9), with references to the Eusebian Canons written below Ammonian Section numbers. It contains prolegomena to the Gospel of John, a Synaxarion, a Menologion, and pictures.

== Text ==
The Greek text of the codex is considered to be a representative of the Byzantine text-type. Biblical scholar Kurt Aland placed it in Category V of his New Testament manuscript classification system. Category V manuscripts are described as "manuscripts with a purely or predominantly Byzantine text." According to the Claremont Profile Method it represents textual family Π^{b} in Luke 1, family Π^{a} in Luke 10 and Luke 20.

== History ==
The earliest history of the manuscript is unknown. It was added to the list of New Testament manuscripts by biblical scholar Johann M. A. Scholz (1794–1852).

During 1859 the manuscript was bought from Spyridion Lambros in Athens, along with 22 other manuscripts of the New Testament (codices: 269, 271, 272, 688, 689, 690, 691, 692, 693, etc.). The manuscript was formerly held in the library of St. Silvester in Rome.

Scholz examined a large part of the manuscript. It was examined by scholar and clergyman Dean Burgon, and it was examined and described by scholar Paulin Martin. Biblical scholar Caspar René Gregory saw the manuscript in 1885.

The manuscript is currently dated by the INTF to the 12th century. It is presently housed at the National Library of France (shelf number Gr. 75) in Paris.

== See also ==
- Minuscule 271
- Minuscule 269
- List of New Testament minuscules
- Biblical manuscript
- Textual criticism
