= Minuscule 490 =

- New Testament manuscript
- Text: Gospels †
- Date: 11th-century
- Script: Greek
- Found: 1825
- Now at: British Library
- Size: 25.3 cm by 19.7 cm
- Type: Byzantine text-type/mixed
- Category: V
- Note: K^{x}

Minuscule 490 (in the Gregory-Aland numbering), ε 106 (in the Soden numbering), is a Greek minuscule manuscript of the New Testament, on parchment. Palaeographically it has been assigned to the 11th-century. Scrivener labeled it by number 574. The manuscript is lacunose.

== Description ==
The codex contains the text of the four Gospels on 192 parchment leaves (size 25.3 cm by 19.7 cm) with some lacunae. The text is written in two columns per page, 27 lines per page.

The text is divided according to the κεφαλαια (chapters), whose numbers are given at the margin, and the τιτλοι (titles) at the top. There is also a division according to the Ammonian Sections (in Mark 234 Sections, the last in 16:9), with references to the Eusebian Canons.

It contains the Epistula ad Carpianum, Eusebian Canon tables, tables of the κεφαλαια (tables of contents) before each Gospel, lectionary markings at the margin (in red), and subscriptions at the end of each Gospel.

== Text ==
The Greek text of the codex is a representative of the Byzantine text-type. Aland placed it in Category V. According to the Claremont Profile Method it represents the textual family K^{x} in Luke 1, Luke 10, and Luke 20. It belongs to 51 manuscripts which are, according to Hermann von Soden, related to the Byzantine commentated text (codices 53, 902).

== History ==
The manuscript once belonged to Claudius James Rich, consul in Baghdad. It was bought in 1825 for the British Museum.

The manuscript was added to the list of New Testament manuscripts by Scrivener (574) and Gregory (490). It was examined by Scrivener and Bloomfield.

It is currently housed at the British Library (Add MS 7141) in London.

== See also ==
- List of New Testament minuscules
- Biblical manuscript
- Textual criticism
