= Minuscule 491 =

- New Testament manuscript
- Text: New Testament (except Rev.) †
- Date: 11th-century
- Script: Greek
- Now at: British Library
- Size: 18.8 cm by 13.5 cm
- Type: Byzantine text-type/mixed
- Category: V
- Hand: beautifully written
- Note: group 16

Minuscule 491 (in the Gregory-Aland numbering), δ 152 (in the Soden numbering), is a Greek minuscule manuscript of the New Testament, on parchment. Palaeographically it has been assigned to the 11th-century. Scrivener labeled it by number 576. The manuscript is lacunose.

== Description ==
The codex contains the text of the New Testament except Book of Revelation on 305 parchment leaves (size 18.8 cm by 13.5 cm) with some lacunae (Mark 1:1-28; Acts 1:1-23; 7:8-39). The text is written in one column per page, 34 lines per page. It is beautifully written.

The text is divided according to the κεφαλαια (chapters), whose numbers are given at the margin, with τιτλοι (titles of chapters) at the top of the pages. The text of the Gospels has also a division according to the Ammonian Sections (in Mark 236 sections, the last in 16:12), (no references to the Eusebian Canons).

It contains the Eusebian tables (blank), tables of the κεφαλαια (tables of contents) before each Gospel, and subscriptions at the end of each Gospel. It contains also Book of Psalms and Hymns with lacunae in Psalm 1-3.

The order of books is usual: Gospels, Acts, Catholic epistles, Pauline epistles, Psalms, and Hymns.

== Text ==
The Greek text of the codex is a representative of the Byzantine text-type. According to Scrivener it is similar to 440. Aland placed it in Category V. According to the Claremont Profile Method in Luke 1 and Luke 20 it belongs to group 16 along with the manuscripts 16, 119, 217, 330, 578, 693, 1528.

== History ==
The manuscript is dated by the INTF to the 11th century.

The manuscript once belonged to the Bishop Butler's collection (as 492 and 493).

The manuscript was added to the list of New Testament manuscripts by Scrivener (576) and Gregory (491). It was examined by Scrivener, Bloomfield, and W. J. Elliott.

It is currently housed at the British Library (Add MS 11836) in London.

== See also ==
- List of New Testament minuscules
- Biblical manuscript
- Textual criticism
