= Minuscule 691 =

- New Testament manuscript
- Text: Gospels
- Date: 13th century
- Script: Greek
- Now at: British Library
- Size: 18.8 cm by 13.9 cm
- Type: Byzantine text-type
- Category: V

Minuscule 691 (in the Gregory-Aland numbering), ε1387 (von Soden), is a Greek minuscule manuscript of the New Testament, on parchment. Palaeographically it has been assigned to the 13th century. The manuscript has complex contents. Scrivener labelled it by 595^{e}.

== Description ==
The codex contains the text of the four Gospels, on 275 parchment leaves (size 18.8 cm by 13.9 cm). The text is written in one column per page, 22 lines per page.

It contains Epistula ad Carpianum, the Eusebian tables, Argumentum, the tables of the κεφαλαια (contents) are placed before each Gospel, numbers of the κεφαλαια (chapters) are given at the left margin, the τιτλοι (titles), Ammonian Sections (237 sections, the last section in 16:15), lectionary markings, incipits, αναγνωσεις (lessons), subscriptions, and "rough pictures" and illuminations. There are no references to the Eusebian Canons.

== Text ==
The Greek text of the codex is a representative of the Byzantine text-type. Hermann von Soden classified it to the textual family K^{r}. Kurt Aland placed it in Category V.

According to the Claremont Profile Method it represents textual family K^{r} in Luke 1 and Luke 20. In Luke 10 no profile was made. It is partly illegible in Luke 1.

== History ==
Scrivener dated the manuscript to the 14th century, Gregory dated it to the 13th or 14th century. Currently the manuscript is dated by the INTF to the 13th century.

The manuscript was bought from Spyridion Lambros from Athens in 1859, along with 22 other manuscripts of the New Testament (codices: 688, 689, 690, 692, 693, etc.).

It was added to the list of New Testament manuscript by Scrivener (595) and Gregory (691).

It was examined by Samuel Thomas Bloomfield and Dean Burgon.

The manuscript is currently housed at the British Library (Add MS 22739) in London.

== See also ==
- List of New Testament minuscules
- Biblical manuscript
- Textual criticism
