= Minuscule 17 =

Greek-Latin minuscule manuscript of the New Testament

- New Testament manuscript
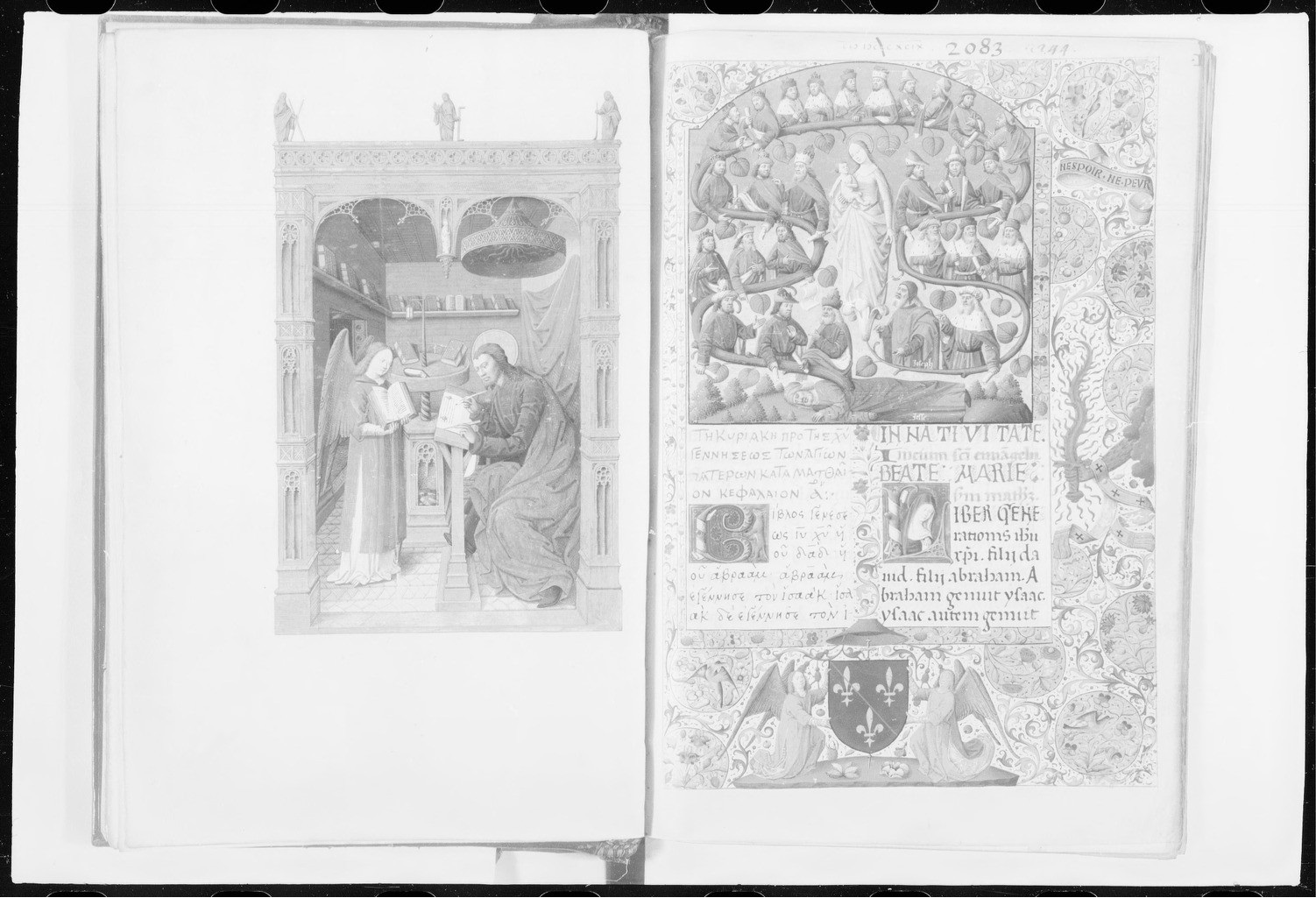
- Text: Gospels
- Date: 15th-century
- Script: Greek-Latin diglot
- Now at: National Library of France
- Size: 30.9 cm by 21 cm
- Category: none
- Hand: elegantly written
- Note: close to minuscules 30, 70

Minuscule 17 (in the Gregory-Aland numbering), ε 525 (Soden). It is a Greek-Latin minuscule manuscript of the New Testament, on 354 parchment leaves (30.9 cm by 21 cm), dated palaeographically to the 15th century (according to Scrivener 16th-century). It has some marginalia.

== Description ==
The codex contains a complete text of the four Gospels on 354 parchment leaves. The text is written in two columns per page, 25-26 lines per page.

The text is divided according to the Ammonian Sections, whose numbers are given at the margin. It contains lectionary markings at the margin (for liturgical use), Latin Synaxarion, and pictures.

It contains the Latin Vulgate version.

== Text ==
Aland did not place the Greek text in any Category. According to the Claremont Profile Method in represents textual family K^{x} in Luke 1 and Luke 20, in Luke 10 no profile was made.

It creates the textual cluster 17 along with manuscripts 30, 70, 120, 287, 288, and 880. Among these manuscripts 30 and 288 form pairs.

In Matthew 1:11 it has additional reading τον Ιωακιμ, Ιωακιμ δε εγεννησεν (of Joakim, and Joakim was the father of). The reading is supported by Codex Campianus, Koridethi, manuscripts of the textual family f^{1}, 33, 70, 71, and 120; the reading was cited by Griesbach in his Novum Testamentum Graece.

== History ==
"It was neatly written in France by George Hermonymus the Spartan, who settled at Paris in 1472, and became the Greek teacher of Budaeus and Reuchlin".

It once belonged to Cardinal Charles de Bourbon (1476-1488). It was examined by Wettstein, Griesbach, Scholz, and Henri Omont. C. R. Gregory saw the manuscript in 1885.

It is currently housed at the Bibliothèque nationale de France (Gr. 55) at Paris.

== See also ==
- Minuscule 18
- Minuscule 16
- List of New Testament minuscules
- Textual criticism
