= Lectionary 229 =

Lectionary ℓ 229
- New Testament manuscript
- Text: Evangelistarium †
- Date: 13th century
- Script: Greek
- Now at: London
- Size: 26 cm by 19.4 cm

Lectionary 229, designated by siglum ℓ 229 (in the Gregory-Aland numbering) is a Greek manuscript of the New Testament, on parchment. Palaeographically it has been assigned to the 13th century. Scrivener labelled it by 223^{evl}. The manuscript has complex context.

== Description ==
The codex contains lessons from the Gospels of John, Matthew, Luke lectionary (Evangelistarium), on 177 parchment leaves (26 cm by 19.4 cm). The text is written in Greek minuscule letters, in two columns per page, 26 lines per page. It contains musical notes.

There are daily lessons from Easter to Pentecost.

It contains the Pericope Adulterae (John 8:3-11) dedicated to Pelagia.

== History ==
Scrivener and Gregory dated the manuscript to the 13th century. It has been assigned by the INTF to the 13th century.

Of the early history of the codex nothing is known.

The manuscript was added to the list of New Testament manuscripts by Scrivener (number 223) and Gregory (number 229). Gregory saw it in 1883. It was examined by S. T. Bloomfield.

The manuscript is not cited in the critical editions of the Greek New Testament (UBS3).

It used to be held in Lambeth Palace. The codex is now housed at the Antiquariat Christi (1187) in London.

== See also ==
- List of New Testament lectionaries
- Biblical manuscript
- Textual criticism
- Lectionary 230
- Lectionary 231

== Bibliography ==
- Gregory, Caspar René (1900). Textkritik des Neuen Testaments. Vol. 1. Leipzig. p. 406.
