= Minuscule 119 =

- New Testament manuscript
- Text: Gospels
- Date: 13th century
- Script: Greek
- Now at: Bibliothèque nationale de France
- Size: 15.5 cm by 16 cm
- Type: Byzantine text-type
- Category: V
- Note: marginalia

Minuscule 119 is a Greek minuscule manuscript of the New Testament, written on parchment. It is designated by the siglum 119 in the Gregory-Aland numbering of New Testament manuscripts, and ε 1290 in the von Soden numbering of New Testament manuscripts. Using the study of comparative writing styles (palaeography), it has been assigned to the 13th century. It has complex contents with maginal notes.

== Description ==
The manuscript is a codex (precursor to the modern book format), containing the complete text of the four Gospels written on 237 parchment leaves (sized 15.5 cm by 16 cm). The text is written in one column per page, 23 lines per page (size of text-block is 12 cm by 8 cm). The capital letters are written in red ink, the large initial letters in gold ink.

The text is divided according to the chapters (known as κεφαλαια / kephalaia), whose numbers are given in the margin, and their titles (known as τιτλοι / titloi) written at the top of the pages. There is also a division according to the smaller Ammonian Sections (236 in Mark 236, last at 16:12), but contains no references to the Eusebian Canons (both early systems of dividing the Gospels into sections).

It contains introductions (prolegomena), the tables of contents (also known as κεφαλαια) before each Gospel, lectionary markings in the margin (for liturgical use), subscriptions at the end of each Gospel, numbers of lines (known as στιχοι / stichoi), and pictures.

== Text ==
The Greek text of the codex is considered to be a representative of the Byzantine text-type. Biblical scholar Kurt Aland placed it in Category V of his New Testament manuscript classification system. Category V manuscripts are described as "manuscripts with a purely or predominantly Byzantine text."

According to biblical scholar Caspar René Gregory, it is textually close to Minuscule 120. According to the Claremont Profile Method (a specific analysis of textual data), it belongs to the textual cluster 16 in Luke 1, Luke 10, and Luke 20. To this cluster also belong the following minuscule manuscripts: 16, 217, 330, 491, 578, 693, 1528, and 1588.

== History ==
The manuscript once belonged to the French printer Simon de Colines in 1534. It was examined by Louvois for textual critics Ludolph Kuster, Johann J. Griesbach, and Paulin Martin. Gregory saw it in 1885.

It is currently dated by the INTF to the 13th century CE. It is presently housed at the National Library of France (shelf number Gr. 85), in Paris.

== See also ==
- Minuscule 120
- Minuscule 118
- List of New Testament minuscules
- Biblical manuscript
- Textual criticism
- Family 1
