= Lectionary 151 =

Lectionary ℓ 151
- New Testament manuscript
- Text: Evangelistarion
- Date: 12th century
- Script: Greek
- Now at: British Library
- Size: 31.9 by 23.8 cm
- Hand: large and bold

Lectionary 151, designated by siglum ℓ 151 (in the Gregory-Aland numbering) is a Greek manuscript of the New Testament, on parchment leaves. Palaeographically it has been assigned to the 12th century.

== Description ==
The codex contains Lessons from the Gospels of John, Matthew, Luke lectionary (Evangelistarium), on 359 parchment leaves (31.9 cm by 23.8 cm). The text is written in Greek minuscule letters, in two columns per page, 18 lines per page. It has music notes. It is ornamented and splendid copy, in large, bold, cursive letters.

At the end of the manuscript is a note, written in Rome in 1699, by L. A. Zacagni, certifying that the volume was then more than 700 years old. Bloomfield dated it to the 12th century.

== History ==
The manuscript was written for use in Constantinople. It was examined by Bloomfield and Gregory.

The manuscript is not cited in the critical editions of the Greek New Testament (UBS3).

Currently the codex is located in the British Library (Harley MS 5785).

== See also ==
- List of New Testament lectionaries
- Biblical manuscript
- Textual criticism
