= Hôtel de Ville, Villiers-sur-Marne =

Town hall in Villiers-sur-Marne, France

Hôtel de Ville
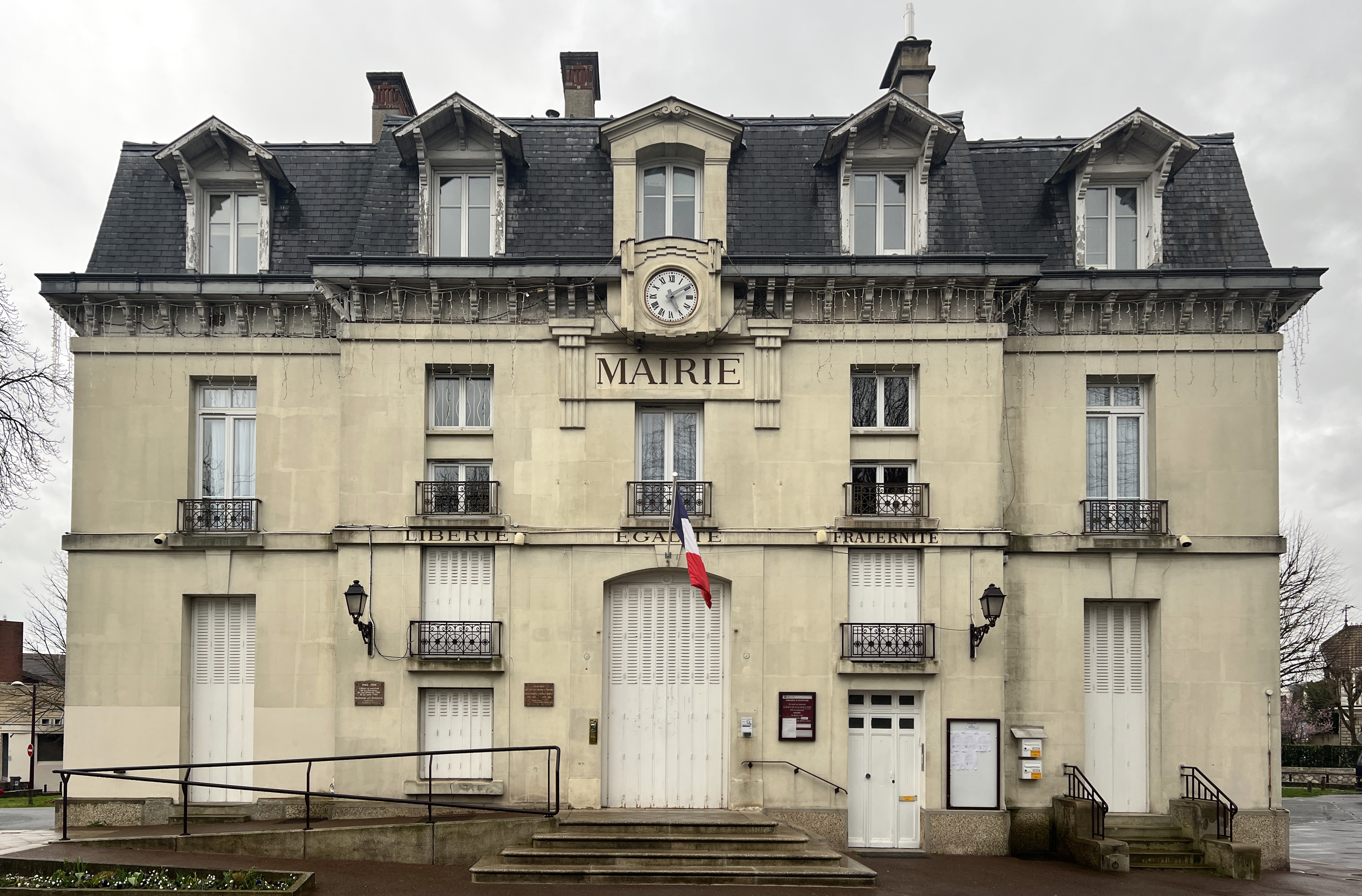
- The main frontage of the Hôtel de Ville in March 2022
- Interactive map of the Hôtel de Ville area

General information
- Type: City hall
- Architectural style: Neoclassical style
- Location: Villiers-sur-Marne, France
- Coordinates: 48.8260°N 2.5408°E
- Completed: 1873

Design and construction
- Architect: Victor Guillemin

The Hôtel de Ville (French pronunciation: [otɛl də vil], City Hall) is a municipal building in Villiers-sur-Marne, Val-de-Marne, in the eastern suburbs of Paris, standing on Place de l'Hôtel de Ville. It has been included on the Inventaire général des monuments by the French Ministry of Culture since 1986.

== History ==
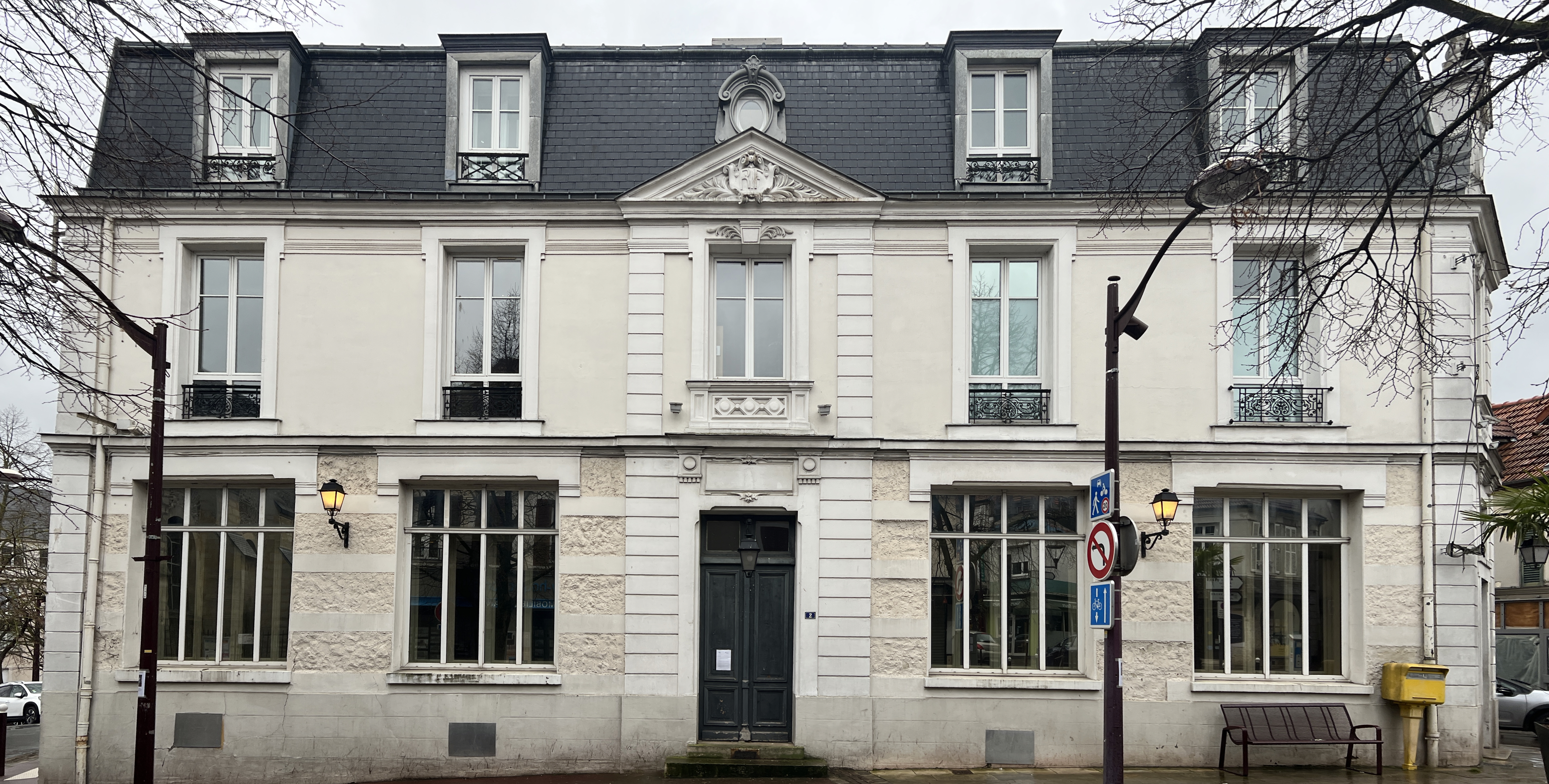
The old town hall

Following the French Revolution, the town council initially met in the house of the mayor at the time. This arrangement continued until 1842 when the council established a combined town hall and school at No. 2 Place de l'Eglise. The property was designed in the neoclassical style, built in ashlar stone and was then enlarged in 1890.

The design involved a near symmetrical main frontage of five bays facing onto the street. The central bay featured a square headed doorway with a stone surround and a panel above. On the first floor, there was a casement window with a stone surround flanked by banded pilasters supporting a pediment. The other bays were fenestrated by wide casement windows with hood moulds on the ground floor and by smaller casement windows with stone surrounds on the first floor. Internally, there was a boys' classroom, a school teacher's flat, and a municipal office. After the building was no longer required for municipal use, it became a post office, then a police station and later the Centre Municipal d'Arts Claude Debussy.

In the early 1920s, following significant population growth, the council led by the mayor, Auguste Bernier, decided to purchase a more substantial property. The building it selected was the Maison Le Vraux. Maison Le Vraux had been designed by Victor Guillemin in the neoclassical style, built in ashlar stone and had been completed in 1873. It was acquired by the council in 1922.

The design involved a symmetrical main frontage of five bays facing towards the corner of Rue du Général Gallieni and Rue du Général-de-Gaulle. The central section of three bays, which was slightly projected forward, featured a segmental headed doorway with a keystone. On the first floor, there was a French door with an iron railing surmounted by a panel, inscribed with the word "Mairie", and a clock. The outer bays of the central section featured bi-partite openings stacked vertically on both floors, while the end bays contained tall doorways on the ground floor and tall casement windows on the first floor. Internally, the principal room was the Salle des Mariages (wedding room).

In 1952, the mayor, Marcel Liaudon, commissioned the artist, Lucienne Filippi, to create a mural for the wedding hall. It depicted the seigneur of Villiers, Jean Budé, who was an advisor to King Louis XI, being greeting by local people.

In 1994, a plaque was installed on the front of the building, on the left of the openings in the second bay, to commemorate the 50th anniversary of the liberation of the town by American troops on 22 August 1944. In 2001, another plaque was installed on the front of the building, at the instigation of Fondation Napoléon and les Amis du Patrimoine Napoléonien, on the right of the openings in the second bay, to commemorate the lives of General Gabriel Neigre, who saw action at the Battle of Waterloo in 1815, and General Jean-Pierre Jacquet, who saw action at the Battle of Dresden in 1813 during the Napoleonic Wars. They both came from Villiers and were both buried at Père Lachaise Cemetery.
