= Lectionary 168 =

12th century Greek manuscript of the New Testament

Lectionary ℓ 168
- New Testament manuscript
- Text: Apostolarion
- Date: 12th century
- Script: Greek
- Now at: Lambeth Palace
- Size: 27.3 by 21.1 cm

Lectionary 168, designated by siglum ℓ 168 (in the Gregory-Aland numbering) is a Greek manuscript of the New Testament, on parchment leaves. Palaeographically it has been assigned to the 12th century. Formerly it was labelled as Lectionary 64^{a}. Scrivener designated it by 62^{a}.

== Description ==
The codex contains Lessons from the Acts and Epistles lectionary (Apostolarion) with lacunae at the end.

The text is written in Greek minuscule letters, on 219 parchment leaves (27.3 cm by 21.1 cm), in two columns per page, 23 lines per page.

== History ==
The manuscript was examined by Bloomfield and Gregory.

The manuscript is not cited in the critical editions of the Greek New Testament (UBS3).

Currently the codex is located in the Lambeth Palace (1196) at London.

== See also ==
- List of New Testament lectionaries
- Biblical manuscript
- Textual criticism
