= Lectionary 165 =

Lectionary ℓ 165
- New Testament manuscript
- Text: Apostolarion
- Date: 11th century
- Script: Greek
- Now at: Lambeth Palace
- Size: 25.7 by 18.5 cm

Lectionary 165, designated by siglum ℓ 165 (in the Gregory-Aland numbering) is a Greek manuscript of the New Testament, on parchment leaves. Paleographically it has been assigned to the 11th century. Formerly it was labelled as Lectionary 60^{a}. Scrivener by 57^{a}.

== Description ==
The codex contains Lessons from the Acts and Epistles lectionary (Apostolarion) with lacunae at the beginning and end.

The text is written in Greek minuscule letters, on 130 parchment leaves (25.7 cm by 18.5 cm), in two columns per page, 25 lines per page. It contains musical notes.

== History ==
The manuscript was examined by Bloomfield and Gregory.

The manuscript is not cited in the critical editions of the Greek New Testament (UBS3).

Currently the codex is located at the Lambeth Palace (1190) in London.

== See also ==
- List of New Testament lectionaries
- Biblical manuscript
- Textual criticism
