= Lectionary 166 =

13th-century New Testament manuscript

Lectionary ℓ 166
- New Testament manuscript
- Text: Apostolarion
- Date: 13th century
- Script: Greek
- Now at: Lambeth Palace
- Size: 20.2 by 17.1 cm

Lectionary 166, designated by siglum ℓ 166 (in the Gregory-Aland numbering) is a Greek manuscript of the New Testament, on parchment leaves. Palaeographically it has been assigned to the 13th century. Formerly it was labelled as Lectionary 61^{a}. Scrivener by 59^{a}.

== Description ==
The codex contains Lessons from the Acts and Epistles lectionary (Apostolarion) with lacunae at the beginning and end.

The text is written in Greek minuscule letters, on 130 parchment leaves (20.2 cm by 17.1 cm), in one column per page, 19 lines per page.

== History ==
The manuscript was examined by Bloomfield and Gregory.

The manuscript is not cited in the critical editions of the Greek New Testament (UBS3).

Currently the codex is located in the Lambeth Palace (1191) at London.

== See also ==
- List of New Testament lectionaries
- Biblical manuscript
- Textual criticism
