= Codex Ephesinus =

Minuscule 71
- New Testament manuscript
- Name: Codex Ephesinus
- Text: Gospels
- Date: 1160
- Script: Greek
- Found: 1675, Philip Traheron
- Now at: Lambeth Palace
- Size: 16.3 cm by 12.2 cm
- Type: Byzantine text-type
- Category: none
- Hand: elegant
- Note: member of Family 1424

Codex Ephesinus is a Greek minuscule manuscript of the New Testament, on parchment, illuminated, and elegantly written. It is designated by the siglum 71 in the Gregory-Aland numbering of New Testament manuscripts, and ε 253 in the von Soden numbering of New Testament manuscripts. It is dated by the colophon to 1160. In the 15th century the manuscript was prepared for liturgical use. The scribal errors are not numerous, but it has many textual divergences from the majority text. Its textual character has been disputed by scholars since the 19th century.

It has full marginal notes with marks of the text's division, with liturgical notes and scholia. Only one leaf of the codex is lost.

The manuscript was brought to England in 1675 by Philip Traherne, English Chaplain at Smyrna, who made the first collation of its text. The collation was corrected by biblical scholar Frederick H. A. Scrivener in 1845.

It was called Codex Ephesinus, due to its place of origin. It is currently housed in the library of the Lambeth Palace (shelf number 528), in London.

== Description ==
The manuscript is a codex (precursor to the modern book format), containing an almost complete text of the four Gospels on 265 parchment leaves (sized 16.3 cm by 12.2 cm). The leaves are arranged in small quarto format (this being four parchment leaves placed on top of each other, then folded in half to create 8 pages). Only one leaf of the codex had been lost, which contained Matthew 14:13-15:16, before it was examined by Philip Traherne.

The text is written in one column per page, 20-28 lines per page, in "elegant minuscule letters". The large initial letters are written in red ink. The breathings (rough breathing, smooth breathing, added for pronunciation purposes) and accents are included, though there are some evident errors.

The text is divided according to the chapters (known as κεφαλαια / kephalai), whose numbers are given in the margin, and their titles (known as τιτλοι / titloi) written at the top of the pages. There is also another division according to the smaller and more ancient Ammonian Sections (356 in Matthew, 234 in Mark, 342 in Luke, and only 219 in John), with references to the Eusebian Canons which are written below the Ammonian Section numbers (both early divisions of the Gospel texts into different sections).

It contains the Epistula ad Carpianum (Epistle to Carpian) at the beginning of the codex, with the table of contents (also known as κεφαλαια) placed before each Gospel in the 15th century, and slight illuminations before each Gospel. In the 15th century lectionary markings were added in the margin and the manuscript was prepared for the church liturgical service. Every Gospel passage used for the church readings is marked at the beginning by αρχαι (archai / "beginning") and at the end by τελη (tele / "end"). It has some commentary text in the margin.

Final nu is rare (this is the inclusion of the Greek letter ν/n at the end of words before a vowel), and the few errors of itacism are "of the common kind". It has Iota subscript in a few places (e.g. Luke 10:28; 22:23; 23:43; John 5:4), but not Iota adscript (this being the inclusion of the Greek letter ι/i either under the final vowel as a subscript letter, or included in the main text). It contains some grammar forms, which usually occur in certain manuscripts: θυγατεραν (Luke 13:16), ειπαν (19:25), πεσατε (23:30), ηγαπησες (17:26), μελαινα (Matthew 5:36), πτερνα (John 13:18). The accusative is often put for the dative after λεγω (e.g. Matthew 8:21; 10:1; Mark 12:38; Luke 5:14). Many clauses are omitted by the error of homeoteleuton (clauses with similar endings).

== Text ==
BIblical scholar and textual critic Johann M. A. Scholz had noted that the manuscript "familiae plerumque adhaeret Constantinopolitanae" / frequently adheres to the Constantinopolitan Family (today this is called as the Byzantine text-type). Scrivener however differed in opinion, and noted that Scholz seemed to have missed many remarkable readings of the codex, so Scholz's opinion was not reliable. Biblical scholar, textual critic and manuscript hunter Constantin von Tischendorf disagreed with Scrivener, and concurred with Scholz's opinion that the text of the codex represents the Byzantine text-type.

Textual critic Hermann von Soden classified it to the textual group I^{φr}. Biblical scholar Kurt Aland did not place it in any Category of his New Testament manuscript classification system, but classified it to the textual family Family 1424.

Biblical scholar John Mill found some textual resemblance to minuscule 29. Scrivener found its textual resemblance to minuscule 692, Caspar René Gregory to minuscule 248.

According to Scrivener there are few Greek manuscripts of the New Testament from the 12th century that "will be found to equal it in weight and importance". The manuscript presents "a text full of interest, and much superior to that of the mass manuscripts of its age". According to Gregory, the text of the manuscript is "good".

According to the Claremont Profile Method (a specific analysis of textual data), it represents textual cluster M27 in Luke 1, Luke 10, and Luke 20, as a core member. To this cluster belong also manuscripts like Minuscule 569, 692, 750.

It has many unique textual variants (e.g. Matthew 16:11; Luke 6:49; 10:24; 19:21), many of them are supported by manuscripts like Codex Vaticanus, Codex Bezae, Codex Cyprius, and Lectionary 183. Sometimes it stands alone or nearly alone among manuscript examined by Scrivener (Luke 10:22; 17:26; 24:18.27; John 1:42; 2:17; 3:25; 8:3; 12:2). The text has many corrections made by a later hand.

Some notable readings

Matthew 1:11

τον Ιωακιμ, Ιωακιμ δε εγεννησεν (of Joakim, and Joakim was the father of) - 71 M Θ f^{1} Minuscule 17 33 70 120
omit - Majority of manuscripts

Matthew 16:11

σαδδουκαιων και φαρισαιων (Sadducees and Pharisees) - 71 C^{c2}
φαρισαιων και σαδδουκαιων (Pharisees and Sadducees) - Majority of manuscripts

Matthew 17:14

τω Ιησου (to Jesus) - 71
αυτω (to Him) - Majority of manuscripts

Matthew 19:12

δια την βασιλειαν των ουρανων ευνουχισαν εαυτους (for the kingdom of the heavens made themselves Eunuchs) - 71
omit - Majority of manuscripts

Mark 1:10

καταβαῖνον καὶ μένον ἐπ᾿ αὐτόν (descended and remained upon him) - 71 א W 4. 33. 176. 1555. 2680. ℓ 211^{2} Ori
καταβαῖνον ἐπ᾿ αὐτόν (descended upon him) - Majority of manuscripts

Luke 6:49

επι της γης (upon the earth) - 71
omit - 565
επι την γην (upon the earth) - Majority of Manuscripts

== History ==
According to the colophon (in red), on the reverse side of folio 263, the manuscript was written in ετει απο χριστου ᾳρξ (1160 year from Christ), but ᾳρξ (1160) was overwritten by later hand, the real year was σχξη (868). It means it was written in 1160 A.D.

The manuscript once belonged to the Archbishop of Ephesus. It was brought to England in 1675 by Philip Traherne, English Chaplain at Smyrna in 1669-1674. In 1679 the manuscript was presented by him to the Lambeth Palace Library, along with a collation, where it is held to the present day (shelf number 528).

Philip Traheron made the first collation and description of the codex. According to Scrivener it was careful collation, but Traheron never before examined manuscripts and his notes showed his ignorance of textual criticism. He diverted his attention to its illustration, neglected to distinguish readings of prima manu (the first hand) from the corrections made by later hand, both in the text and margin, but Scrivener very seldom detected him in absolute error. Several transcripts of Traherons collation were made, two of them were still available for Scrivener (Burney 24 and Lambeth 528b), though Scrivener did not examine them.

John Mill used the collation of Traheron in his edition of the Greek New Testament (1709), but very carelessly. John Mill called it Codex Ephesinus. It was added to the list of Greek New Testament manuscripts by biblical scholar and textual critic Johann J. Wettstein, who gave it the number 71. Wettstein saw the codex and its collation in 1746 and wrongly deciphered the date of the colophon as 1166. Textual critic Johann J. Griesbach hesitated between the dates 1160 or 1166. In his own edition of the Greek New Testament, he cited 5 of the readings of the codex, and Scholz only cited 3 readings in first six chapters of the Gospel of Matthew. Scrivener enumerated 29 various readings in the first six chapters of Matthew. Gregory saw the codex in 1883.

In 1845, Scrivener used the collation of Traheron and compared it with the text of the manuscript, and revised it, in regard to changes made by later correctors. Readings from the manuscript are not cited in the modern critical editions of the UBS or Nestle-Aland Novum Testamentum Graece.

== See also ==
- Minuscule 72
- Minuscule 70
- List of New Testament minuscules
- Biblical manuscript
- Textual criticism
