= Lectionary 167 =

Lectionary ℓ 167
- New Testament manuscript
- Text: Apostolarion
- Date: 15th century
- Script: Greek
- Now at: Lambeth Palace
- Size: 26.3 by 18.3 cm

Lectionary 167, designated by siglum ℓ 167 (in the Gregory-Aland numbering) is a Greek manuscript of the New Testament, on paper leaves. Palaeographically it has been assigned to the 15th century. Formerly it was labelled as Lectionary 63^{a}. Scrivener designated it by 61^{a}.

== Description ==
The codex contains Lessons from the Acts and Epistles lectionary (Apostolarion) with lacunae at the beginning.

The text is written in Greek minuscule letters, on 75 paper leaves (26.3 cm by 18.3 cm), in one columns per page, 17 lines per page.

== History ==
The manuscript was examined by Bloomfield and Gregory.

The manuscript is not cited in the critical editions of the Greek New Testament (UBS3).

Currently the codex is located in the Lambeth Palace (1195) at London.

== See also ==
- List of New Testament lectionaries
- Biblical manuscript
- Textual criticism
