= Minuscule 287 =

- New Testament manuscript
- Text: Gospels
- Date: 1478
- Script: Greek
- Now at: Bibliothèque nationale de France
- Size: 23.9 cm by 14.1 cm
- Type: Byzantine text-type
- Category: V
- Note: marginalia

Minuscule 287 (in the Gregory-Aland numbering), ε 523 (Soden), is a Greek minuscule manuscript of the New Testament, on paper. It is dated by a colophon to the year 1478. It has marginalia.

== Description ==
The codex contains the text of the four Gospels on 322 paper leaves (23.9 cm by 14.1 cm). The text is written in one column per page, in 18-19 lines per page.

The text is divided according to the κεφαλαια (chapters), whose numbers are given at the margin, and the τιτλοι (titles of chapters) at the top of the pages. There is also a division according to the Ammonian Sections (in Mark 234 sections, the last in 16:9), but without references to the Eusebian Canons.

It contains pictures.

== Text ==
The Greek text of the codex is a representative of the Byzantine text-type. Aland placed it in Category V. According to Claremont Profile Method it represents textual family K^{x} in Luke 1 and Luke 20. In Luke 10 no profile was made. It belongs to the textual cluster 17 along with manuscripts 17, 30, 70, 120, 288, and 880.

== History ==
The manuscript was written by George Hermonymus for David Chambellan. The manuscript was added to the list of New Testament manuscripts by Scholz (1794-1852). It was examined and described by Dean Burgon (Guardian, Jan. 22, 1873.) and Paulin Martin. C. R. Gregory saw it in 1884.

The manuscript is currently housed at the Bibliothèque nationale de France (Gr. 98) at Paris.

== See also ==
- List of New Testament minuscules
- Biblical manuscript
- Textual criticism
