= Minuscule 492 =

- New Testament manuscript
- Text: Gospels
- Date: 1325/1326
- Script: Greek
- Now at: British Library
- Size: 24 cm by 16.5 cm
- Type: Byzantine text-type/mixed
- Category: V
- Hand: beautifully written

Minuscule 492 (in the Gregory-Aland numbering), ε 433 (in the Soden numbering), is a Greek minuscule manuscript of the New Testament, on parchment. It is dated by a colophon to the year 1325 or 1326. Scrivener labeled it by number 577. The manuscript has complex contents.

== Description ==
The codex contains a complete text of the four Gospels on 269 parchment leaves (size 24 cm by 16.5 cm). The text is written in one column per page, 24 lines per page. According to Scrivener it is beautifully written.

The text is divided according to the κεφαλαια (chapters), whose numbers are given at the margin, with the τιτλοι (titles) at the top of the pages.

It contains the tables of κεφαλαια (tables of contents) before each Gospel, lectionary markings at the margin, some αναγνωσεις (later hand), and pictures. Liturgical books with hagiographies Synaxarion and Menologion were added by a later hand.

== Text ==
The Greek text of the codex is a representative of the Byzantine text-type. Aland placed it in Category V. Hermann von Soden included it to the textual family K^{x}. It was confirmed by Claremont Profile Method in Luke 1 and Luke 20. In Luke 10 no profile was made.

== History ==
The manuscript was written by Constantin, a monk, for the wish of Archimadrite Kallinikus, in the monastery of the Saint Demetrius. It was once at Sinai, then it belonged to the Bishop Butler's collection (as 491 and 493).

The manuscript was added to the list of New Testament manuscripts by Scrivener (577) and Gregory (492). It was examined by Scrivener and Bloomfield. Edward Maunde Thompson published facsimile.

It is currently housed at the British Library (Add MS 11838) in London.

== See also ==
- List of New Testament minuscules
- Biblical manuscript
- Textual criticism
