= Minuscule 493 =

- New Testament manuscript
- Text: Gospels †
- Date: 15th century
- Script: Greek
- Now at: British Library
- Size: 27 cm by 20 cm
- Type: Byzantine text-type/mixed
- Category: V
- Hand: ill written
- Note: marginalia

Minuscule 493 (in the Gregory-Aland numbering), ε 501 (in the Soden numbering), is a Greek minuscule manuscript of the New Testament, on paper. Palaeographically it has been assigned to the 15th century. Scrivener labeled it by number 578. The manuscript is lacunose.

== Description ==
The codex contains the text of the four Gospels on 157 paper leaves (size 27 cm by 20 cm) with some lacunae (Matthew 4:13-11:27; Mark 1:1-6:1). The missing texts were added by a later hand. The text is written in one column per page, 27 lines per page. According to F. H. A. Scrivener it is ill written.

It text was divided according to the Ammonian Sections by a later hand. Lectionary markings at the margin were added by a later hand. There are also some marginal notes added by a later hand.

== Text ==
The Greek text of the codex is a representative of the Byzantine text-type. Aland placed it in Category V. Hermann von Soden included it to the textual family K^{x}. It was confirmed by the Claremont Profile Method.

== History ==
The manuscript once belonged to Samuel Butler's collection (as 491 and 492).

The manuscript was added to the list of New Testament manuscripts by Scrivener (578) and Gregory (493). It was examined by Scrivener and Bloomfield. Gregory saw it in 1883.

It is currently housed at the British Library (Add MS 11839) in London.

== See also ==
- List of New Testament minuscules
- Biblical manuscript
- Textual criticism
