= Minuscule 688 =

- New Testament manuscript
- Text: Gospels
- Date: June 1179
- Script: Greek
- Now at: British Library
- Size: 24.2 cm by 19.3 cm
- Type: Byzantine text-type
- Category: V

Minuscule 688 (in the Gregory-Aland numbering), ε246 (von Soden), is a Greek minuscule manuscript of the New Testament, on parchment. It is dated by a colophon to the year 1179. The manuscript has complex contents. Scrivener labelled it by 592^{e}.

== Description ==
The codex contains the text of the four Gospels, on 226 parchment leaves (size 24.2 cm by 19.3 cm), in 24 quires. The text is written in two columns per page, 24 lines per page.

It contains Synaxarion, Prolegomena, the tables of the κεφαλαια (contents) are placed before each Gospel, numbers of the κεφαλαια (chapters) are given at the left margin, the τιτλοι (titles) at the top, the Ammonian Sections (Mark 242, the last section in 16:20), without a references to the Eusebian Canons, lectionary markings, and pictures.

According to Scrivener the manuscript is written "with peculiar, almost barbarous, illuminations".

== Text ==
The Greek text of the codex is a representative of the Byzantine text-type. Kurt Aland placed it in Category V.

According to the Claremont Profile Method it represents textual family K^{x} in Luke 1 and Luke 20. In Luke 10 no profile was made. It creates textual cluster with Codex Athous Dionysiou.

== History ==
According to the colophon the manuscript was written by monk John αναγνωστης in 1179. It was bought from Spyridion Lambros from Athens in 1859 (along with the codex 689, 690, 691, 692, and 693).

It was added to the list of New Testament manuscript by Scrivener (592) and Gregory (688).

It was examined by Bloomfied, Dean Burgon, and Kirsopp Lake.

The manuscript is currently housed at the British Library (Add MS 22736) in London.

== See also ==
- List of New Testament minuscules
- Biblical manuscript
- Textual criticism
