= Minuscule 217 =

- New Testament manuscript
- Text: Gospels
- Date: 12th century
- Script: Greek
- Found: 1478
- Now at: Biblioteca Marciana
- Size: 20.5 cm by 15.5 cm
- Type: Byzantine
- Category: V
- Note: marginalia

Minuscule 217 (in the Gregory-Aland numbering), ε 233 (Soden), is a Greek minuscule manuscript of the New Testament, on parchment. Palaeographically it has been assigned to the 12th century. It has marginalia.

== Description ==
The codex contains a complete text of the four Gospels, on 299 parchment leaves (size 20.5 cm by 15.5 cm), with a commentary. The text is written in one column per page, 21 lines per page.

The text is divided according to the Ammonian Sections (in Mark 236 sections, the last in 16:12), whose numbers are given at the margin, but references to the Eusebian Canons are absent. There is no a division according to the κεφαλαια (chapters), but it has their τιτλοι (titles of chapters) at the top of the pages.

It contains the Epistula ad Carpianum, the Eusebian tables, prolegomena of Cosmas, tables of the κεφαλαια (tables of contents) before each Gospel. The manuscript has survived in good condition.

== Text ==
The Greek text of the codex is a representative of the Byzantine text-type. Aland placed it in Category V.

According to the Claremont Profile Method it belongs to the textual cluster 16. It creates pair with 578 in Luke 1 and Luke 10. Textually it is close to the manuscripts 16, 119, 330, 491, 578, 693, 1528, and 1588. They create Group 16 with following profile:

Luke 1: 8, (9), 13, 23, 28, 34, 37, 43.
Luke 10: 3, 7, 15, 19, 23, (25), 58, 63.
Luke 20: 4, 13, 19, 50, 51, 54, 55, 62, 65. Codex 217 forms a pair with codex 578 in Luke 1 and 10. They lack readings 13 and 23 and add 48 in Luke 1, and lacks 20 in Luke 20.

== History ==
The manuscript was given in 1478 by Peter de Montagnana to the monastery of St. John, in Viridario, at Padua. It was examined by Friedrich Münter (for Birch) and Burgon. C. R. Gregory saw it in 1886.

It is currently housed at the Biblioteca Marciana (Gr. I,3 (944)), at Venice.

== See also ==
- List of New Testament minuscules
- Biblical manuscript
- Textual criticism
