= Minuscule 30 =

- New Testament manuscript
- Text: Gospels
- Date: 15th-century
- Script: Greek
- Now at: National Library of France
- Size: 22.7 cm by 14.9 cm
- Type: Byzantine text-type
- Category: V
- Note: close to minuscules 17, 70 marginalia

Minuscule 30 is a Greek minuscule manuscript of the New Testament Gospels, written on paper. It is designated by the siglum 30. in the Gregory-Aland numbering of New Testament manuscripts, and ε 522 in the von Soden numbering of New Testament manuscripts. Using the study of comparatie handwriting styles (palaeography), it has been assigned to the 15th century. It was formerly known as Colbertinus 4444. It has marginal notes.

== Description ==
The manuscript is a codex (precursor to the modern book format), containing the complete text of the four Gospels written on 313 paper leaves (sized 22.7 cm by 14.9 cm). The text is written in one column per page, 14 lines per page.

The text is divided according to the chapters (known as κεφαλαια / kephalaia, whose numbers are given in the margin in both Greek and Latin numerals, and their titles (known as τιτλοι / titloi) written at the top of the pages. There is no other division according to the Ammonian Sections or the Eusebian Canons (both early systems of division to the Gospels, usually used in manuscripts of the New Testament).

BIblical scholar Frederick H. A Scrivener suggested it was made by the same copyist who copied Minuscule 17 and 70 (both copied by George Hermonymus), whose text it much resembles.

== Text ==
The Greek text of the codex is considered to be a representative of the Byzantine text-type. Biblical scholar Kurt Aland placed it in Category V of his New Testament Manuscript classification system. Category V manuscripts are described as "manuscripts with a purely or predominantly Byzantine text."

According to the Claremont Profile Method (a specific analysis of textual data), it represents the textual family K in Luke 1 and Luke 20. In Luke 10 no profile was made. It belongs to the textual cluster 17 along with the minuscule manuscripts 70, 120, 287, 288, and 880.

== History ==
The earliest history of the manuscript is unknown. It once belonged to J. B. Hantin, a French numismatic. It was taken from Hantin's library by Bishop Moore in 1706. It was added to the list of the New Testament manuscripts by textual critic Johann J. Wettstein, who gave it the number 30.

It was examined and described by biblical scholar John Mill, who cited it is Colbertinus 4, and by biblical scholars Johann M. A. Scholz (1794-1852), and Paulin Martin. Scholz found that its text much resembles minuscule 17. Biblical scholar Caspar René Gregory saw the manuscript in 1884.

The manuscript is dated by the INTF to the 15th-century. It is currently housed at the National Library of France (shelf number Gr. 100) in Paris.

== See also ==
- Minuscule 31
- Minuscule 29
- List of New Testament minuscules
- Biblical manuscripts
- Textual criticism
