= Traheron =

Traheron is a surname. Notable people with the surname include:

- Bartholomew Traheron (1510?–1558?), English Protestant writer
- Philip Traheron (1635–1686), British diplomat and author
