= Lectionary 230 =

Lectionary ℓ 230
- New Testament manuscript
- Text: Evangelistarium
- Date: 13th century
- Script: Greek
- Now at: London
- Size: 28.7 cm by 22.6 cm

Lectionary 230, designated by siglum ℓ 230 (in the Gregory-Aland numbering) is a Greek manuscript of the New Testament, on parchment. Palaeographically it has been assigned to the 13th century. Scrivener labelled it by 224^{evl}. The manuscript has complex contents.

== Description ==
The codex contains lessons from the Gospels of John, Matthew, Luke lectionary (Evangelistarium), on 318 parchment leaves (28.7 cm by 22.6 cm). The text is written in Greek minuscule letters, in two columns per page, 22 lines per page. It contains musical notes.

There are weekday Gospel lessons.

== History ==
Scrivener and Gregory dated the manuscript to the 13th century. It is presently assigned by the INTF to the 13th century.

The manuscript was written by one Theodor, a calligrapher.

Of the early history of the codex nothing is known.

The manuscript was added to the list of New Testament manuscripts by Scrivener (number 224) and Gregory (number 230). Gregory saw it in 1883. It was examined by S. T. Bloomfield.

The manuscript is sporadically cited in the critical editions of the Greek New Testament (UBS3).

Formerly it was held in Lambeth Palace. Currently the codex is housed at the Antiquariat Christi (1188) in London.

== See also ==
- List of New Testament lectionaries
- Biblical manuscript
- Textual criticism
- Lectionary 229

== Bibliography ==
- S. T. Bloomfield, Critical Annotations: Additional and Supplementary on the New Testament (1860)
