= Minuscule 288 =

- New Testament manuscript
- Text: Matthew, Luke, John
- Date: 15th century
- Script: Greek
- Now at: Oxford, Paris
- Size: 24.5 cm by 15 cm
- Type: Byzantine text-type
- Category: V
- Note: marginalia

Minuscule 288 (in the Gregory-Aland numbering), ε 524 (Soden), is a Greek minuscule manuscript of the New Testament, on paper. Palaeographically it has been assigned to the 15th century. It has marginalia.

== Description ==
The codex contains the text of the Gospel of Matthew, Gospel of Luke, and Gospel of John on 250 paper leaves (24.5 cm by 15 cm). The Gospel of Mark was originally considered missing, but has since been identified as Minuscule 2532, a number now retired as the Mark portion has joined the other three gospels under the number Minuscule 288. The text is written in one column per page, in 18 lines per page.

The text is divided according to the κεφαλαια (chapters), whose numbers (also Latin κεφαλαια) are given at the margin, and the τιτλοι (titles of chapters) at the top of the pages.

It contains subscriptions at the end of each Gospel, and pictures.

== Text ==
The Greek text of the codex is a representative of the Byzantine text-type. Aland placed it in Category V. According to Claremont Profile Method it represents in Luke 1 and Luke 20 textual family K^{x}. In Luke 10 no profile was made. It belongs to the textual cluster 17 along with manuscripts 30, 70, 120, 287, and 880. It creates a pair with 30.

== History ==
The manuscript was written by George Hermonymus.

The Gospel of Matthew once belonged to Antonio Dizomaeo. The Gospel of Luke once belonged to Germain de Brixius, then to Jacques Tusan († 1546). The Gospel of John belonged to C. Emmery Sanguintiniani, then to Henri Jacques Nonpareil de Caumont, Herzog de la Force († 1726), then to Antoine Moriau, who presented it to the library of the Institut de Paris.

It was added to the list of New Testament manuscripts by Scholz (1794-1852). It was examined by Wettstein, and Griesbach. Paulin Martin described part of the codex housed in BnF (Gospel of Luke). C. R. Gregory saw the manuscript in 1883 (Oxford) and in 1884 (Paris).

The manuscript is currently housed in these places:

- Matthew: Bodleian Library (Canonici Gr. 33) at Oxford
- Mark: Corpus Christi College (MS. 224) at Cambridge
- Luke: Bibliothèque nationale de France (Gr. 99) at Paris
- John: Institut de France (Ms. 536) at Paris.

== See also ==
- List of New Testament minuscules
- Biblical manuscript
- Textual criticism
