= Minuscule 16 =

Greek-Latin minuscule manuscript of the New Testament

- New Testament manuscript
- Text: Gospels
- Date: 14th-century
- Script: Greek-Latin diglot
- Now at: National Library of France
- Size: 31.6 cm by 25.2 cm
- Type: mixed/Byzantine
- Category: none
- Note: group 16 marginalia

Minuscule 16 is a Greek-Latin diglot minuscule manuscript of the New Testament Gospels, written on parchment. It is designated by the siglum 16 in the Gregory-Aland numbering of New Testament manuscripts, and ε 449 in the von Soden numbering of New Testament manuscripts. Using the study of comparative writing styles (palaeography), it is assigned to the 14th-century. It has full marginal notes and was prepared for liturgical use.

== Description ==
The manuscript is a codex (precursor to the modern book format), containing an almost complete text of the four Gospels written on 361 parchment leaves (sized 31.6 cm × 25.2 cm (12.4 in × 9.9 in)), with one missing section (Mark 16:14–20). The text is written in two columns per page, 26 lines per page.

The text is divided according to the chapters (known as κεφαλαια / kephalai), whose numbers are given in the margin, with their titles (known as τιτλοι / titloi) at the top of the pages. There is also a division according to the Ammonian Sections, Ammonian Sections, but without references to the Eusebian Canons.

It contains the Eusebian Canon tables (Latin) at the beginning, tables of contents (also known as κεφαλαια) before each Gospel, lectionary markings in the margin (for liturgical use), and subscriptions at the end of each Gospel.

The text of the codex is written using four different colours of ink: "The general run of the narrative is in vermilion; the words of Jesus, the genealogy of Jesus, and the words of angels are in crimson; the words quoted from the Old Testament as well as those of the disciples, Zachariah, Elizabeth, Mary, Simeon, and John the Baptist are in blue; and the words of Pharisees, the centurion, Judas Iscariot, and the devil are in black." It contains only one picture.

Mark 16:14–20 is lost from the Greek portion, and Mark 9:18–16:20 is lost from the Latin portion. THe Latin texts of Mark 9:18–11:13, Luke 5:21–44, and John 1:1–12:17 were added by a later hand.

== Text ==
The Greek text of the codex is considered to be mixed, but with the Byzantine text-type predominant. Textual critic Hermann von Soden classified it to the textual family I^{βb}, meaning it has some Caesarean readings. Biblical scholar Kurt Aland did not place it in any Category of his New Testament manuscript classification system.

In 2014, scholar Kathleen Maxwell demonstrated minuscule 16 to be dependent upon [minuscule 1528. There are red crosses at various points throughout 1528 corresponding to the locations of illustrations in 16.

Textually it is close to the manuscripts 119, 217, 330, 491, 578, 693, 1528 and 1588. They create textual Group 16 with the following profile:

Luke 1: 8, (9), 13, 23, 28, 34, 37, 43.
Luke 10: 3, 7, 15, 19, 23, (25), 58, 63.
Luke 20: 4, 13, 19, 50, 51, 54, 55, 62, 65.

The Latin text in Matt. 7:13 has the textual variant: "lata via et spaciosa est lila quae"; in Mt 13:3 "Ecce qai exiit Seminare Semen suum, et dum seminat quaedam cecid."

== History ==
The earliest history of the manuscript is unknown. It was formerly in the hands of Strozzi family, then of Catherine de' Medici. It was examined by biblical scholars Johann J. Wettstein, Johnn M. A. Scholz, and Paulin Martin. Biblical scholar Caspar René Gregory saw the manuscript in 1884.

The manuscript is dated by the INTF to the 14th-century. It is currently housed at the Bibliothèque nationale de France (shelf number Gr. 54) at Paris.

== See also ==
- Minuscule 17
- Minuscule 15
- List of New Testament minuscules
- Textual criticism
