= Lectionary 231 =

Lectionary ℓ 231
- New Testament manuscript
- Text: Evangelistarium †
- Date: 13th century
- Script: Greek
- Now at: London
- Size: 22.3 cm × 18.2 cm (8.8 in × 7.2 in)

Lectionary 231, designated by siglum ℓ 231 (in the Gregory-Aland numbering) is a Greek manuscript of the New Testament on parchment. Palaeographically it has been assigned to the 13th century. Scrivener labelled it by 225^{evl}. Some leaves of the codex were lost.

== Description ==
The codex contains lessons from the Gospels of John, Matthew, Luke lectionary (Evangelistarium), on 151 parchment leaves (22.3 cm × 18.2 cm (8.8 in × 7.2 in)), with some lacunae. The text is written in Greek minuscule letters, in two columns per page, 27 lines per page. Four leaves on cotton paper were supplied by later hand.

There are daily lessons from Easter to Pentecost.

== History ==
Scrivener and Gregory dated the manuscript to the 13th century. It is presently assigned by the INTF to the 13th century.

Johannes Aloura presented this manuscript to the Xeropotamou monastery in 1618.

The manuscript was added to the list of New Testament manuscripts by Scrivener (number 225) and Gregory (number 231). Gregory saw it in 1883. It was examined by S. T. Bloomfield.

The manuscript is not cited in the critical editions of the Greek New Testament (UBS3).

Formerly it was held in Lambeth Palace. Currently the codex is housed at the Antiquariat Christi (1189) in London.

== See also ==
- List of New Testament lectionaries
- Biblical manuscript
- Textual criticism

== Bibliography ==
- S. T. Bloomfield, Critical Annotations: Additional and Supplementary on the New Testament (1860)
