= Minuscule 32 =

- New Testament manuscript
- Text: Gospels †
- Date: 12th century
- Script: Greek
- Now at: National Library of France
- Size: 14.7 cm by 10.9 cm
- Type: Byzantine text-type
- Category: V
- Note: marginalia

Minuscule 32 (in the Gregory-Aland numbering), ε 296 (Von Soden). It is a Greek minuscule manuscript of the New Testament, written on vellum, on 244 leaves (14.7 cm by 10.9 cm). Palaeographically it has been assigned to the 12th century. Formerly it was Colbertinus 6511. The manuscript is lacunose, marginalia are incomplete.

== Description ==
The codex contains the text of the four Gospels with three lacunae. The text begins in Matthew 10:22, and lacks in Matthew 24:15-30 and Luke 22:35-John 4:20. Some other parts were supplied on paper. The text is written in one column per page, 21 lines per page (size of text 10.5 cm by 7.5 cm).

The text is divided according to the κεφαλαια (chapters), whose numbers are given at the margin, and their τιτλοι at the top of the pages. There is also another division according to the smaller Ammonian Sections (in Mark 233 sections, the last section in 16:8). There is no references to the Eusebian Canons.

It contains prolegomena and tables of the κεφαλαια (tables of contents) before each Gospel. Lectionary markings – for liturgical use – were added at the margin by a later hand.

The text of John 5:3.4 is marked by an obelus as doubtful, the Pericope de Adulterae (John 7:53-8:11) is omitted.

== Text ==
The Greek text of the codex is a representative of the Byzantine text-type. Hermann von Soden listed it to the "Antiocheian" – i.e. Byzantine – commentated group. Aland placed it in Category V. According to the Claremont Profile Method it belongs to the 1519 group, and creates a pair with 269.

== History ==
The manuscript was examined and described by John Mill (as Colbertinus 5), Scholz and Paulin Martin.

It was added to the list of the New Testament manuscripts by J. J. Wettstein, who gave it the number 32. C. R. Gregory saw the manuscript in 1885.

It is currently housed at the Bibliothèque nationale de France (Gr. 116) at Paris.

== See also ==
- List of New Testament minuscules
- Biblical manuscripts
- Textual criticism
