= Villiers-sur-Marne =

- Commune
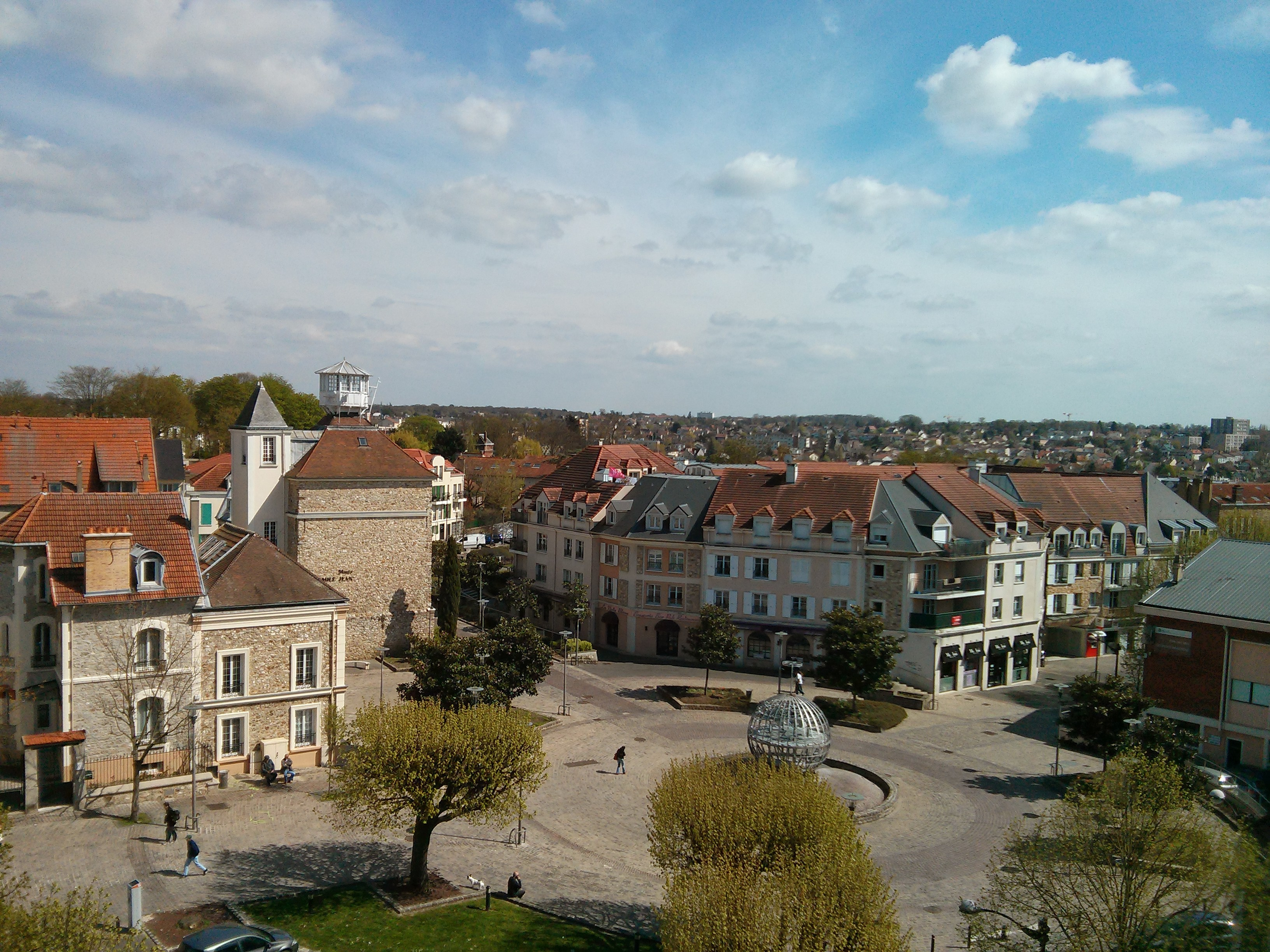
- The Place Rémoiville

- Coat of arms

- Location (in red) within Paris inner suburbs
- Location of Villiers-sur-Marne
- Location within France Location within Île-de-France (region)
- Coordinates: 48°49′39″N 2°32′41″E
- Country: France
- Region: Île-de-France
- Department: Val-de-Marne
- Arrondissement: Nogent-sur-Marne
- Canton: Villiers-sur-Marne
- Intercommunality: Grand Paris

Government
  - Mayor (2026–32): Jacques-Alain Bénisti
- Area^{1}: 4.33 km^{2} (1.67 sq mi)
- Highest elevation: 103 m (338 ft)
- Lowest elevation: 66 m (217 ft)
- Population (2023): 33,162
  - Density: 7,660/km^{2} (19,800/sq mi)
- Time zone: UTC+01:00 (CET)
  - Summer (DST): UTC+02:00 (CEST)
- INSEE/Postal code: 94079 /94350
- ^{1} French Land Register data, which excludes lakes, ponds, glaciers > 1 km^{2} (0.386 sq mi or 247 acres) and river estuaries.

Villiers-sur-Marne (French pronunciation: [vilje syʁ maʁn], literally Villiers sur Marne) is a commune in the eastern suburbs of Paris, France. It is located 14.8 km (9.2 mi) from the center of Paris.

The commune of Villiers-sur-Marne is part of the sector of Porte de Paris, one of the four sectors of the "new town" of Marne-la-Vallée.

== History ==
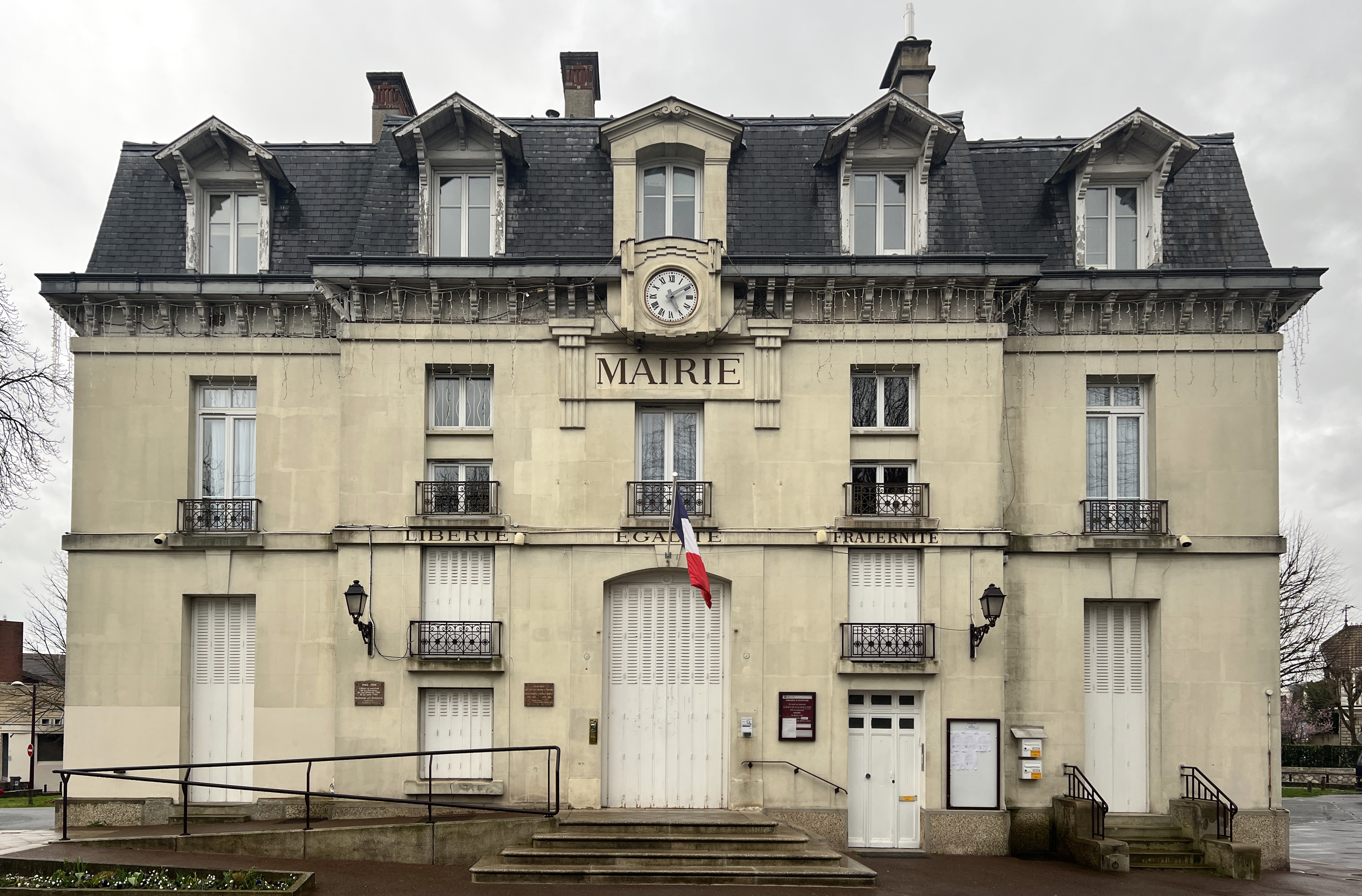
The Hôtel de Ville

The Hôtel de Ville was completed in 1873. On 7 July 1899, a part of the territory of Villiers-sur-Marne was detached and merged with a part of the territory of La Queue-en-Brie and a part of the territory of Chennevières-sur-Marne to create the commune of Le Plessis-Trévise.

== Population ==
Historical population

Year	Pop.	±% p.a.
1793	600	—
1821	704	+0.57%
1846	765	+0.33%
1861	824	+0.50%
1866	919	+2.21%
1872	990	+1.25%
1876	1,109	+2.88%
1881	1,287	+3.02%
1886	1,493	+3.01%
1891	1,750	+3.23%
1896	2,055	+3.27%
1901	1,935	−1.20%
1906	2,552	+5.69%
1911	3,011	+3.36%
1921	3,827	+2.43%

Year	Pop.	±% p.a.
1926	5,613	+7.96%
1931	6,145	+1.83%
1936	7,020	+2.70%
1946	7,172	+0.21%
1954	9,205	+3.17%
1962	13,068	+4.48%
1968	15,789	+3.20%
1975	22,293	+5.05%
1982	22,022	−0.17%
1990	22,740	+0.40%
1999	26,632	+1.77%
2007	28,158	+0.70%
2012	27,737	−0.30%
2017	28,456	+0.51%
2023	33,162	+2.58%

Source: EHESS and INSEE (1968-2023)

== Transport ==
Villiers-sur-Marne is served by Villiers-sur-Marne–Le Plessis-Trévise station on Paris RER line E.

== Education ==
There are seven preschools and seven elementary schools.

- Preschools: J. et M. Dudragne, Théophile Gautier, Edouard Herriot, Jean Jaures, Charles Peguy, Charles Perrault, Jean Renon
- Elementary schools: Albert Camus, Léon Dauer, J. et M. Dudragne, Jules Ferry, Edouard Herriot, Jean Jaures, Jean Renon

There are two junior high schools, Collège Pierre et Marie Curie, and Collège Les Prunais.

== Twin towns – sister cities ==
Villiers-sur-Marne is twinned with:

- Entroncamento, Portugal
- Friedberg, Germany

Until November 2011, it was also twinned with Bishop's Stortford in the United Kingdom, when the English town controversially cut its links with Villiers-sur-Marne, as well as Friedberg.

== Notable people ==
- Mossi Traoré, fashion designer
- Vanessa Paradis, singer
- Hayat Boumeddiene, fugitive and suspected accomplice of her partner Amedy Coulibaly, the main suspect for the Montrouge shooting and the hostage-taker and gunman in the Porte de Vincennes siege, in which he killed four hostages.
- Dominique Pelicot

== See also ==
- Communes of the Val-de-Marne department
