= Minuscule 901 =

- New Testament manuscript
- Text: New Testament
- Date: 11th-century
- Script: Greek
- Now at: Uppsala University
- Size: 17 cm by 12.5 cm
- Type: Byzantine
- Category: V
- Note: marginalia

Minuscule 901 (in the Gregory-Aland numbering), δ 162 (von Soden), is an 11th-century Greek minuscule manuscript of the New Testament on parchment. It has marginalia. The manuscript has survived in its complete form.

== Description ==
The codex contains the text of the New Testament (without Book of Apocalypse), on 328 parchment leaves (size 17 cm by 12.5 cm), with some lacunae. The text is written in one column per page, 31 lines per page. It contains also liturgical books with hagiographies: Synaxarion and Menologion.

The order of books: Gospels, Acts of the Apostles, Catholic epistles, and Pauline epistles.

It has errors of Iota subscriptum.

It contains tables of the κεφαλαια (tables of contains) before each of the Gospels, Euthalian Apparatus, subscriptions at the end of each of the Gospels with numbers of στιχοι. It has so called Jerusalem Colophon.

== Text ==
The Greek text of the codex is a representative of the Byzantine. Hermann von Soden classified it to the textual family I^{φβ}. Kurt Aland placed it in Category V.

According to the Claremont Profile Method it represents the textual family K^{x} in Luke 1 and Luke 20. In Luke 10 no profile was made. It was corrected to Family Π in Luke 20.

== History ==
According to F. H. A. Scrivener it was written in the 12th-century, according to C. R. Gregory it was written in the 11th-century. Currently the manuscript is dated by the INTF to the 11th-century. It once belonged to Jakob Jonas Björnståhl (1731-1779), professor from Lund University, who bequeathed it for the University of Uppsala. In 1784 it was acquired for the library of the University of Uppsala as "Björnståhl 2" along with 902 and 1852. Gregory saw it in 1891.

The manuscript was added to the list of New Testament manuscripts by Scrivener (615^{e}) and Gregory (901^{e}).

It is not cited in critical editions of the Greek New Testament (UBS4, NA28).

The manuscript is housed at the Uppsala University (Gr. 12) in Uppsala.

== See also ==
- List of New Testament minuscules (1–1000)
- Biblical manuscript
- Textual criticism
