= Jakob Jonas Björnståhl =

Swedish orientalist (1731-1779)

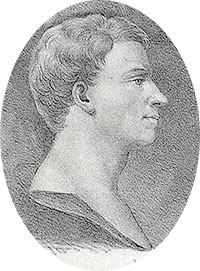
Jakob Jonas Björnståhl (1806)

Jakob Jonas Björnståhl (January 23, 1731 in Rotarbo – July 11, 1779 in Thessaloniki) was a Swedish orientalist and Greek philologist from Lund University. He was a manuscript collector (minuscule 901, minuscule 902, and minuscule 1852). In 1753 he became a student at Uppsala University. In 1761 he received a Master's degree in arts and a position of docent in Gothic form Johan Ihre.
