= Minuscule 70 =

Greek minuscule manuscript of the New Testament

- New Testament manuscript
- Text: Gospels
- Date: 15th century
- Script: Greek
- Now at: Cambridge University Library
- Size: 28.5 cm by 17.7 cm
- Type: Byzantine text-type
- Category: V
- Note: close to minuscules 17, 30

Minuscule 70 is a Greek minuscule manuscript of the New Testament Gospels, on parchment leaves. It is designated by the siglum 70. in the Gregory-Aland numbering of New Testament Manuscripts, and ε 521 in the von Soden numbering of New Testament manuscripts. It was created sometime between 1491 and 1494. The manuscript has complex contents. The marginal notes are incomplete.

== Description ==
The manuscript is a codex (precursor to the modern book format), containing the complete text of the four Gospels written on 186 leaves (sized 28.5 cm by 17.7 cm). The text is written in one column per page, 23 lines per page. The large initial letters are written in gold and other colour inks.

The text is divided according to the chapters (known as κεφαλαια / kephalaia), whose numbers are given in the margin in Latin (as also seen in minuscule 62). It contains the chapter titles (known as τιτλοι / titloi) written at the top of the pages, and there are some marginal corrections made by humanist scholar Guillaume Budé, and some by diplomat George Hermonymus, who also copied the manuscript.

== Text ==
The Greek text of the codex is considered to be a representative of the Byzantine text-type. Biblical scholar Kurt Aland placed it in Category V of his Ne Testament Manuscript classification system. Category V manuscripts are described as "manuscripts with a purely or predominantly Byzantine text."

According to the Claremont Profile Method (a specific analysis of textual data), it represents the textual family K^{x} in Luke 1 and Luke 20. In Luke 10 no profile was made. It belongs to the textual cluster 17.

In Matthew 1:11 it has an additional reading: τον Ιωακιμ, Ιωακιμ δε εγεννησεν (of Joakim, and Joakim was the father of). This reading is also found in the codicies Campianus (M) and Koridethi (Θ), the minuscule manuscripts of the textual family ƒ^{1}, and the minuscules Minuscule 17, 33, 71, and 120. This reading was cited by textual critic Johann J. Griesbach in his Novum Testamentum Graece (The Greek New Testament).

== History ==
The manuscript was written in Paris between 1491 and 1494 for Guillaume Budé by George Hermonymus (like the minuscules 30 and 287). It once belonged to Bunckle of London, then to Bishop Moore of Ely, England.

It was used by biblical scholar John Mill in his Novum Testamentum (labelled as Bu.). Biblical scholar Caspar René Gregory saw it in 1885. It is currently housed at the Cambridge University Library (shelf number Ll. 2.13), in Cambridge.

== See also ==
- Minuscule 71
- Minuscule 69
- List of New Testament minuscules
- Biblical manuscript
- Textual criticism
