= Minuscule 120 =

- New Testament manuscript
- Text: Gospels †
- Date: 12th century
- Script: Greek
- Now at: Bibliothèque nationale de France
- Size: 18.3 cm by 13.7 cm
- Type: Byzantine text-type
- Category: V
- Note: marginalia

Minuscule 120 (in the Gregory-Aland numbering), ε 1202 (Soden), is a Greek minuscule manuscript of the New Testament, on parchment leaves. Palaeographically it has been assigned to the 12th or 13th century. It has complex contents with some marginalia.

== Description ==
The codex contains a complete text of the Gospels of Matthew, Luke, John on 183 (177 + 6) parchment leaves (size 18.3 cm by 13.7 cm). The text is written in one column per page, 30 lines per page (size of text 12 by 8 cm). The large initial letters in gold, the ink is black. The leaves 40-67 with Gospel of Mark were lost.

The text of the Gospels is divided according to the κεφαλαια (chapters), whose numbers are given at the margin, and τιτλοι (titles of chapters) of these κεφαλαια are inserted at the top of the pages. The text has also another division according to the smaller Ammonian Sections. It has no references to the Eusebian Canons.

== Text ==
The Greek text of the codex is a representative of the Byzantine text-type. Aland placed it in Category V.

According to Gregory textually it is very close to the codex 119.

According to the Claremont Profile Method it represents textual family K^{x} in Luke 1, Luke 10, and Luke 20.

It belongs to the textual cluster 17 along with manuscripts 30, 70, 287, 288, and 880.

== History ==
Formerly the manuscript belonged to St. Victor on the Walls. Probably it was used by Robert Estienne in his Editio Regia and was designed by him as ιδ'.

The manuscript was examined and described by Griesbach and Paulin Martin. C. R. Gregory saw it in 1885 and 1891.

It is currently housed at the Bibliothèque nationale de France (Supp. Gr. 185), at Paris.

== See also ==
- Minuscule 121
- Minuscule 119
- List of New Testament minuscules
- Biblical manuscript
- Textual criticism
