= Minuscule 271 =

- New Testament manuscript
- Text: Gospels
- Date: 11th century
- Script: Greek
- Now at: Bibliothèque nationale de France
- Size: 19.2 cm by 13.2 cm
- Type: Byzantine text-type
- Category: none
- Note: marginalia

Minuscule 271 (in the Gregory-Aland numbering), ε 169 (Soden), is a Greek minuscule manuscript of the New Testament, on parchment. Palaeographically it has been assigned to the 11th century.

== Description ==
The codex contains the text of the four Gospels on 252 parchment leaves (19.2 cm by 13.2 cm). The text is written in two columns per page, in 22 lines per page.

The text is divided according to the κεφαλαια (chapters), whose numbers are given at the margin, and their τιτλοι (titles of chapters) at the top of the pages. There is also another division according to the smaller Ammonian Sections, but without references to the Eusebian Canons.

It contains the Epistula ad Carpianum, Eusebian Canon tables, tables of the κεφαλαια (tables of contents) before each Gospel, and portraits of the four Evangelists before each Gospel.

== Text ==
The Greek text of the codex is a representative of the Byzantine text-type. Hermann von Soden classified it to A^{k} (Antiocheian – i.e. Byzantine – commentated text). Kurt Aland did not place it in any Category. According to the Claremont Profile Method it represents textual family K^{x} in Luke 1 and Luke 20, and belongs to the textual cluster Ω. In Luke 10 no profile was made.

Textually it is close to the codex 53.

== History ==
The manuscripts was added to the list of New Testament manuscripts by Scholz (1794-1852). It was examined and described by Paulin Martin. C. R. Gregory saw it in 1885.

The manuscript is currently housed at the Bibliothèque nationale de France (Suppl. Gr. 75) at Paris.

== See also ==
- Minuscule 272
- Minuscule 270
- List of New Testament minuscules
- Biblical manuscript
- Textual criticism
