= Minuscule 29 =

- New Testament manuscript
- Text: Gospels
- Date: 10th century
- Script: Greek
- Now at: National Library of France
- Size: 18.1 cm by 14.1 cm
- Type: Byzantine text-type
- Category: V

Minuscule 29 is a Greek minuscule manuscript of the New Testament Gospels, written on vellum. It is designated by the siglum 29. in the Gregory-Aland numbering of New Testament manuscripts, and ε 1022 in the von Soden of New Testament manuscripts. Using the study of comparative writing styles (palaeography), it has been assigned to the 10th century.

== Description ==
The manuscript is a codex (precursor to the modern book format), containing the text of the four Gospels written on 169 parchment leaves (sized 18.1 cm by 14.1 cm). Some leaves of the original codex were lost, containing Matthew 1-15, Mark 16:15-20, and Luke 4:28-5:7, and were supplied in the 15th century by paper leaves. The text is written in one column per page, 30 lines per page. It is "beautifully but carelessly" written by a Latin copyist. The initial letters are written in coloured ink.

The text is divided according to the chapters (known as κεφαλαια / kephalaia), whose numbers are given in the margin, and their titles (known as τιτλοι / titloi) written at the top of the pages. There is also a division according to the Ammonian Sections (234 in Mark, the last in 16:9) with references to the Eusebian Canons (both early divisions of the Gospels into sections).

It contains the Prolegomena of Cosmas, Eusebian Canon tables at the beginning, subscriptions at the end of each Gospel, liturgical books with hagiographies (Synaxarion and Menologion), and notes in the margin. It contains corrections in the margin made by the initial copyist (known as prima manu / "first hand").

== Text ==
The Greek text of the codex is considered to be a representative of the Byzantine text-type. Biblical scholar Kurt Aland placed it in Category V of his New Testament Manuscript classification system. Category V manuscripts are described as "manuscripts with a purely or predominantly Byzantine text." Several of its corrections match readings seen in the textual Family Π.

According to the Claremont Profile Method (a specific analysis of textual data), it represents textual family K^{x} in Luke 1 and Luke 20. In Luke 10 no profile was made.

== History ==
The earliest history of the manuscript is unknown. The manuscript was brought from Greece. It was added to the list of the New Testament manuscripts by biblical scholar Johann J. Wettstein, who gave it the number 29.

The manuscript was examined by biblical scholar John Mill, who labelled it as Colbertinus 3. Mill compared its text with that of Minuscule 71 and found some affinities. Biblical scholar Johann M. A. Scholz (1794-1852) examined its text, but only in Mark 1-5 and John 5-8. It was examined and described by Paulin Martin. Biblical scholar Caspar René Gregory saw the manuscript in 1885.

Biblical scholar Frederick H. A. Scrivener dated the manuscript to the 12th century. It is currently dated by the INTF to the 10th century. It is presently housed at the National Library of France (shelf number Gr. 89) in Paris.

== See also ==
- Minuscule 30
- Minuscule 28
- List of New Testament minuscules
- Biblical manuscript
- Textual criticism
