= Philip Traherne =

English diplomat and writer

Philip Traherne, or Traheron (/trəˈhɑːrn/; 9 August 1635 in Lugwardine – 1686 in St. Nicholas, Hereford) was an English diplomat, author of books.

He was son of Thomas Traherne (1603–1644) and Mary. He was English Chaplain at Smyrna in 1669–1674. He possessed minuscule 71, a Greek manuscript of the four Gospels, and brought it to England. Traherne collated text of the manuscript, and in 1679, presented it to Lambeth Palace along with its collation.

== Works ==
- The soul's communion with her saviour. Or, The history of our Lord Jesus Christ, written by the four evangelists digested into devotional meditations (1685)
