= Minuscule 53 =

- New Testament manuscript
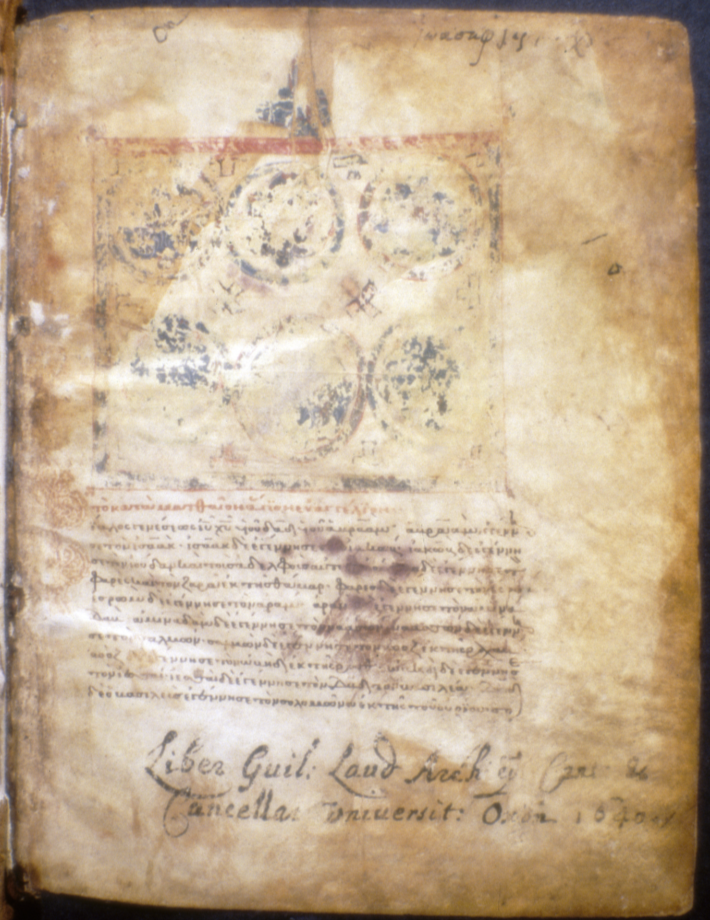
- Text: Gospels
- Date: 13th/14th century
- Script: Greek
- Now at: Bodleian Library
- Size: 15.5 cm by 11.5 cm
- Type: Byzantine text-type
- Category: V
- Hand: beautifully written

Minuscule 53 (in the Gregory-Aland numbering), ε 444 (Von Soden), is a Greek minuscule manuscript of the New Testament, on parchment leaves. Palaeographically It has been assigned to the 13th or 14th century. It has marginalia.

== Description ==
The codex contains complete text of the four Gospels on 140 leaves (size 15.5 cm by 11.5 cm). The text is written in one column per page, 29-33 lines per page. The initial letters in red ink.

The text is divided according to the κεφαλαια (chapters), whose numbers are given at the margin, with the τιτλοι (titles of chapters) at the top of the pages. There is no a division according to the Ammonian Sections with references to the Eusebian Canons.

It contains Prolegomena, and subscriptions at the end of each Gospel.

== Text ==
The Greek text of the codex is a representative of the Byzantine text-type. Kurt Aland placed it in Category V. According to the Claremont Profile Method it represents K^{x} text in Luke 1 and Luke 20. In Luke 10 no profile was made. It creates textual pair with 902.

Textually it is close to Minuscule 271.

== History ==
The name of scribe was probably Nicholaus (?). The manuscript was examined by John Mill (Selden 1). C. R. Gregory saw it in 1883.

It is currently housed in at the Bodleian Library (Selden Supra 28), at Oxford.

== See also ==
- List of New Testament minuscules
- Biblical manuscript
- Textual criticism
