= Minuscule 902 =

- New Testament manuscript
- Text: Gospels
- Date: 12th century
- Script: Greek
- Found: 18th century
- Now at: Uppsala University
- Size: 16 cm by 12 cm
- Type: Byzantine
- Category: V
- Note: marginalia

Minuscule 902 (in the Gregory-Aland numbering), ε 1213 (von Soden), is a 12th-century Greek minuscule manuscript of the New Testament on parchment. It has marginalia. The manuscript has survived in complete condition.

== Description ==
The codex contains the text of the four Gospels, on 230 parchment leaves (size 16 cm by 12 cm), with some lacunae. The text is written in one column per page, 24 lines per page. It contains also Credo in Greek on folio 4 recto.

The text is divided according to the κεφαλαια (chapters), whose numbers are given at the margin, and their τιτλοι (titles of chapters) at the top of the pages.

It contains prolegomena, tables of the κεφαλαια (tables of contains) before each of the Gospels, subscriptions at the end of each of the Gospels.

== Text ==
The Greek text of the codex is a representative of the Byzantine. Hermann von Soden classified it to the textual family Antiocheian (i.e. Byzantine) commentated text with siglum A^{k}. Kurt Aland placed it in Category V.

According to the Claremont Profile Method it represents the textual family K^{x} in Luke 1 and Luke 20. In Luke 10 no profile was made. It creates textual pair with minuscule 53.

== History ==
According to F. H. A. Scrivener and C. R. Gregory it was written in the 12th century. Currently the manuscript is dated by the INTF to the 12th century. It once belonged to Jakob Jonas Björnståhl (1731-1779), professor from Lund University, who bequeathed it for the University of Uppsala. In 1784 it was acquired for the library of the University of Uppsala as "Björnståhl 3" along with 901 and 1852. Gregory saw it in 1891.

The manuscript was added to the list of New Testament manuscripts by Scrivener (616^{e}) and Gregory (902^{e}).

It is not cited in critical editions of the Greek New Testament (UBS4, NA28).

The manuscript is housed at the Uppsala University (Gr. 13) in Uppsala.

== See also ==
- List of New Testament minuscules (1–1000)
- Biblical manuscript
- Textual criticism
