= Minuscule 269 =

- New Testament manuscript
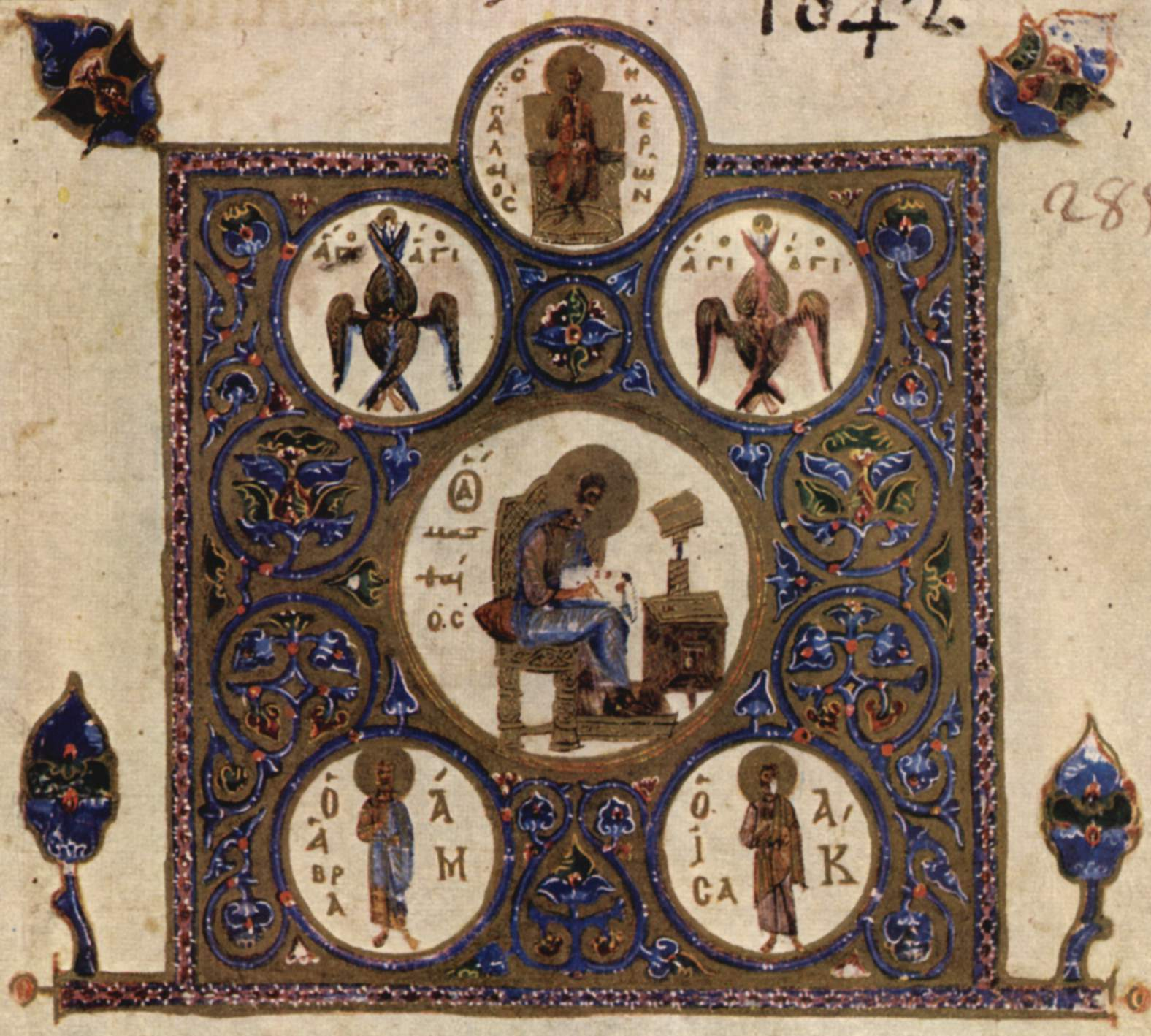
- Text: Gospels
- Date: 12th century
- Script: Greek
- Now at: National Library of France
- Size: 23.8 cm by 19.8 cm
- Type: Byzantine text-type
- Category: V
- Note: marginalia

Minuscule 269 (in the Gregory-Aland numbering), ε 290 (Soden), is a Greek minuscule manuscript of the New Testament, on parchment. Palaeographically it has been assigned to the 12th century. It has marginalia.

== Description ==
The codex contains the text of the four Gospels on 215 parchment leaves (23.8 cm by 19.8 cm), with lacunae (Matthew 1:1-8; Mark 1:1-7; Luke 1:1-8; Luke 24:50-John 1:12). Text of Luke 24:50-53 was supplied by a later hand. The text is written in one column per page, in 28 lines per page.

The text is divided according to the κεφαλαια (chapters), whose numbers are given at the margin, and their τιτλοι (titles of chapters) at the top of the pages. There is also a division according to the smaller Ammonian Sections (Matthew 355, Mark 233 – the last section in 16:8, Luke 342, John 232).

It contains Prolegomena to the Gospel of John, tables of the κεφαλαια (tables of contents) before each Gospel, Verses, and pictures. The Eusebian Canon tables were added by a later hand.

== Text ==
The Greek text of the codex is a representative of the Byzantine text-type. According to Hermann von Soden it represents the Byzantine commentated text. Kurt Aland placed it in Category V. According to the Claremont Profile Method it belongs to the 1519 group. It creates a textual pair with Minuscule 32.

== History ==
The manuscript once belonged to the King Henry IV. The manuscripts was added to the list of New Testament manuscripts by Scholz (1794-1852). It was examined by Burgon. C. R. Gregory saw the manuscript in 1885.

The manuscript is currently housed at the Bibliothèque nationale de France (Gr. 74) in Paris.

== See also ==
- List of New Testament minuscules
- Biblical manuscript
- Textual criticism
