= Minuscule 693 =

- New Testament manuscript
- Text: Gospels †
- Date: 13th century
- Script: Greek
- Now at: British Library
- Size: 25.7 cm by 19.7 cm
- Type: Byzantine text-type/mixed
- Category: none

Minuscule 693 (in the Gregory-Aland numbering), ε1388 (von Soden), is a Greek minuscule manuscript of the New Testament, on parchment. Palaeographically it has been assigned to the 13th century. The manuscript is lacunose. Scrivener labelled it by 597^{e}.

== Description ==
The codex contains the text of the four Gospels on 208 parchment leaves (size 25.7 cm by 19.7 cm), with lacuna (Mark 2:2-17; Luke 1:27-44; John 7:1-21:25). The text is written in one column per page, 21-24 lines per page.

It contains Epistula ad Carpianum, Eusebian tables, Prolegomena, Argumentum, the tables of the κεφαλαια (contents) are placed before each Gospel, numbers of the κεφαλαια (chapters) are given at the margin, the τιτλοι (titles), Ammonian Sections (236 sections, the last section in 16:12), without references to the Eusebian Canons; it has subscriptions at the end, and ornamented headings to the Gospels.

== Text ==
Kurt Aland did not place the Greek text of the codex in any Category.

According to the Claremont Profile Method it represents textual group 16.

== History ==
Scrivener dated the manuscript to the 14th century, Gregory dated it to the 13th or 14th century. Currently the manuscript is dated by the INTF to the 13th century.

The manuscript was bought from Spyridion Lambros from Athens in 1859, along with 22 other manuscripts of the New Testament (codices: 688, 689, 690, 691, 692, etc.).

It was added to the list of New Testament manuscript by Scrivener (597) and Gregory (693).

It was examined by Samuel Thomas Bloomfield and Dean Burgon. Gregory saw the manuscript in 1883.

The manuscript is currently housed at the British Library (Add MS 22741) in London.

== See also ==
- List of New Testament minuscules
- Biblical manuscript
- Textual criticism
