= Jean Budé =

French scholar and bibliophile (1425-1500/1501)

- Born: 1425
- Died: 1500/1501
- Occupation: royal counselor of Louis XI

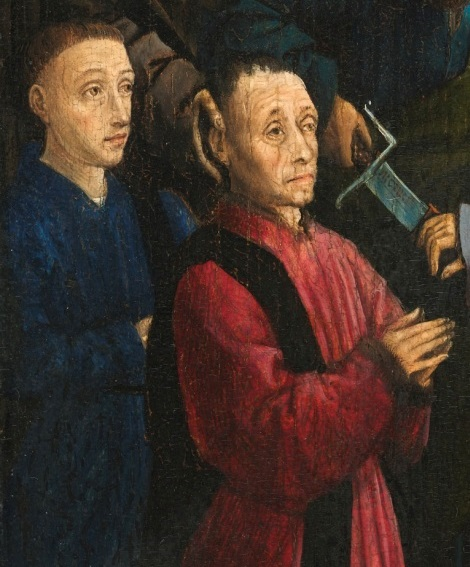
Budé, Jean and Dreux - Arrest of Christ (detail)

Jean Budé (1425 - Paris, 28 February 1500 or 1501) was a royal counselor of Louis XI, man of letters, and a bibliophile with an exceptionally rich library. While in the service of the king, Jean was sent to Burgundy shortly after the death of Charles the Bold on 5 January 1477. He delivered confirmation of the privileges of the city of Dijon.

In 1464 he married Catherine Picart (died 1506). Their children included Guillaume Budé (1467–1540), the celebrated humanist, and Louis Budé, canon of the cathedral chapter of Troyes and later archdeacon there.
