= Minuscule 692 =

- New Testament manuscript
- Text: Gospels †
- Date: 12th century
- Script: Greek
- Now at: British Library
- Size: 20.8 cm by 15.5 cm
- Type: Byzantine text-type
- Category: V

Minuscule 692 is a Greek minuscule manuscript of the New Testament, written on parchment. It is designated by the siglum 692 in the Gregory-Aland numbering of New Testament manuscripts, and as ε1284 in the von Soden numbering of New Testament manuscripts. Using the study of comparative writing styles (palaeography), it has been assigned to the 12th century. The manuscript has some missing portions. Biblical scholar Frederick H. A. Scrivener labelled it as 596^{e}.

== Description ==
The manuscript is a codex (precursor to the modern book format), containing the text of the Gospel of Matthew, Gospel of Mark, and Gospel of Luke on 237 parchment leaves (sized 20.8 cm by 15.5 cm), with a missing section (Luke 2:7-21). The text is written in one column per page, 23 lines per page.

It contains Prolegomena (introductions); the tables of contents (known as κεφαλαια / kephalaia) are placed before each Gospel; the chapter numbers (also known as κεφαλαια) are given in the left margin, with their titles (nown as τιτλοι / titloi) written at the top of the pages; the Ammonian Sections (241 in Mark, the last section in 16:20), and references to the Eusebian Canons (both early divisions of the gospels into sections) are written in the margin; and illuminated headings are included at the start of each Gospel.

According to Scrivener, it is "exquisitely written", with great resemblance to the text of Minuscule 71. The first one to notice this resemblance was Edward A. Guy.

== Text ==
The Greek text of the codex is considered to be a representative of the Byzantine text-type. Biblical scholar Kurt Aland placed it in Category V of his New Testament Manuscripts classification system. Category V manuscripts are described as "manuscripts with a purely or predominantly Byzantine text." According to the Claremont Profile Method (a specific analysis of textual data), it represents textual cluster M27.

== History ==
The manuscript was bought from Spyridion Lambros in Athens in 1859, along with 22 other minuscule manuscripts of the New Testament. It was added to the list of New Testament manuscripts by Scrivener (596) and biblical scholar Caspar René Gregory (692). It was examined by biblical scholars Samuel T. Bloomfield and Dean Burgon. Gregory saw the manuscript in 1883.

Scrivener dated the manuscript to the 14th century, but Gregory dated it earlier to the 12th or 13th century. It is currently dated by the INTF to the 12th century. The manuscript is presently housed at the British Library (shelf number Add MS 22740) in London.

== See also ==
- Minuscule 691
- Minuscule 693
- List of New Testament minuscules
- Biblical manuscript
- Textual criticism
