= George Hermonymus =

15th-century Greek scribe, diplomat, scholar and lecturer

George Hermonymus (Greek: Γεώργιος Ἑρμώνυμος; before 1435 – after 1503), also known as Hermonymus of Sparta, was a 15th-century Greek scribe, diplomat, scholar, and lecturer. He was the first person to teach Greek at the Collège de Sorbonne in Paris.

== Life ==
Although he claimed to originally be from Sparta, that city no longer existed in the 15th century, so it most likely referred to Mystras, the second largest city in the rapidly decaying Byzantine Empire of the time. Mystra was located in the hills overlooking the ancient ruins of Sparta, was the centre of a major revival in Greek literature at the time, and was the home of Gemistus Pletho.

Hermonymus first went to Milan, where he worked as a copyist and then to Paris as there was a great need for a Greek teacher and translator at the time. Hermonymus arrived at Paris in 1476, worked as a copyist at the French court.

Later, as a lecturer at the Sorbonne he took advantage of the vast collection of ancient Greek books in the libraries of Paris to start his scholarly activities. He became renowned as a teacher of Greek and among his pupils were Erasmus, Budaeus, Reuchlin, Jacques Lefèvre d'Étaples and Beatus Rhenanus.

Hermonymus was also involved in diplomacy. In 1475 he was sent to the Kingdom of England by Pope Sixtus IV, in order to lobby for the release of George Neville from imprisonment by Edward IV of England.

== Manuscripts written by Hermonymus ==
- Minuscule 30 (Gregory-Aland)
- Minuscule 70 (Gregory-Aland)
- Minuscule 287 (Gregory-Aland)
- Minuscule 288 (Gregory-Aland)
- Minuscule 880 (Gregory-Aland)

== See also ==
- French humanism
- Greek scholars in the Renaissance

== Sources ==
- Jonathan Harris, Greek Émigrés in the West, 1400-1520 (Camberley: Porphyrogenitus, 1995). ISBN 1-871328-11-X
- Jonathan Harris, 'Greek scribes in England: the evidence of episcopal registers', in Through the Looking Glass: Byzantium through British Eyes, ed. Robin Cormack and Elizabeth Jeffreys, Aldershot UK: Ashgate, 2000, pp. 121–6. ISBN 978-0-86078-667-2
- Maria P. Kalatzi, Hermonymos: A Study in Scribal, Literary and Teaching Activities in the Fifteenth and Early Sixteenth Centuries, Athens, 2009. ISBN 978-960-250-420-8
