= Minuscule 880 =

- New Testament manuscript
- Name: Cod. Ottobonianus gr. 208
- Text: Gospels
- Date: 15th century
- Script: Greek
- Now at: Vatican Library
- Size: 21.2 cm by 13.8 cm
- Type: Byzantine
- Category: V
- Note: marginalia

Minuscule 880 (in the Gregory-Aland numbering), ε526 (von Soden), is a 15th-century Greek minuscule manuscript of the New Testament on paper. It has survived in complete condition.

== Description ==
The codex contains the text of the four Gospels on 355 paper leaves (size 21.2 cm by 13.8 cm). The text is written in one column per page, 17 lines per page.

The text is divided according to the κεφαλαια (chapters), whose numbers are given at the margin, and their τιτλοι (titles of chapters) at the top of the pages. There is also a division according to the Ammonian Sections, but without references to the Eusebian Canons.

It contains pictures and the large decorated initial letters at the beginning of each Gospel. It has lectionary markings at the margin for liturgical reading. According to F. H. A. Scrivener it is "a fine Evangelium".

== Text ==
The Greek text of the codex is a representative of the Byzantine text-type. Kurt Aland placed it in Category V. According to the Claremont Profile Method it represents textual family K^{x} in Luke 1, Luke 10 and Luke 20. It belongs to the textual cluster 17.

== History ==
The manuscript is commonly dated by former (F. H. A. Scrivener, C. R. Gregory) and present palaeographers (Aland) to the 15th century. Currently the manuscript is dated by the INTF to the 15th century. It was written by George Hermonymus, the Spartan, who settled at Paris in 1472. In Paris Hermonymus was a scribe, scholar and lecturer. He was a teacher for Reuchlin and Budeus.

The manuscript was added to the list of New Testament manuscripts by Scrivener (705^{e}), Gregory (880^{e}). Gregory saw it in 1886.

It was examined and described by Ernesto Feron and Fabiano Battaglini (along with minuscule 386 and 878).

Currently the manuscript is housed at the Vatican Library (Ottobonianus gr. 208), in Rome.

== See also ==
- List of New Testament minuscules (1–1000)
- Biblical manuscript
- Textual criticism
- Minuscule 879
