= Minuscule 690 =

- New Testament manuscript
- Text: Gospels
- Date: 14th century
- Script: Greek
- Now at: British Library
- Size: 17.1 cm by 11.8 cm
- Type: Byzantine text-type
- Category: V

Minuscule 690 (in the Gregory-Aland numbering), ε435 (von Soden), is a Greek minuscule manuscript of the New Testament, on parchment. Palaeographically it has been assigned to the 14th century. The manuscript has complex contents. Scrivener labelled it by 594^{e}.

== Description ==
The codex contains the text of the four Gospels, on 237 parchment leaves (size 17.1 cm by 11.8 cm). The text is written in one column per page, 21-28 lines per page.

It contains the Epistula ad Carpianum, the Eusebian tables, the tables of the κεφαλαια (contents) are placed before each Gospel, numbers of the κεφαλαια (chapters) are given at the margin, Ammonian Sections and pictures. There are no a references to the Eusebian Canons. Two rude pictures of Evangelists have been effaced. The τιτλοι (titles), lectionary markings at the margin, Synaxarion, and Menologion.

According to Scrivener it is "rough and abounding with itacisms".

== Text ==
The Greek text of the codex is a representative of the Byzantine text-type. Kurt Aland placed it in Category V.

According to the Claremont Profile Method it represents textual family K^{x} in Luke 1 and Luke 20. In Luke 10 no profile was made. It is partly illegible in Luke 1.

It has some unique readings.

== History ==
Scrivener dated the manuscript to the 13th century, Gregory dated it to the 14th century. Currently the manuscript is dated by the INTF to the 14th century.

The manuscript was bought from Spyridion Lambros from Athens in 1859 (along with the codex 688, 689).

It was added to the list of New Testament manuscript by Scrivener (594) and Gregory (690).

It was examined by Bloomfied, Dean Burgon, and William Hatch.

The manuscript is currently housed at the British Library (Add MS 22738) in London.

== See also ==
- List of New Testament minuscules
- Biblical manuscript
- Textual criticism
