= Minuscule 689 =

- New Testament manuscript
- Text: Gospels
- Date: 13th century
- Script: Greek
- Now at: British Library
- Size: 21.1 cm by 15.7 cm
- Type: Byzantine text-type
- Category: V

Minuscule 689 (in the Gregory-Aland numbering), ε326 (von Soden), is a Greek minuscule manuscript of the New Testament, on parchment. Palaeographically it has been assigned to the 13th century. The manuscript has complex contents. Scrivener labelled it by 593^{e}.

== Description ==
The codex contains the text of the four Gospels, on 313 parchment leaves (size 21.1 cm by 15.7 cm), in 20 quires. The text is written in one column per page, 20 lines per page.

It contains Synaxarion, Prolegomena, the tables of the κεφαλαια (contents) are placed before each Gospel, numbers of the κεφαλαια (chapters) are given at the margin, there are no τιτλοι (titles), lectionary markings, incipits, Synaxarion, Menologion, subscriptions, numbers of στιχοι, and decorations. There are no division according to the Ammonian Sections, with a references to the Eusebian Canons.

== Text ==
The Greek text of the codex is a representative of the Byzantine text-type. Hermann von Soden classified it to the textual family K^{r}. Kurt Aland placed it in Category V.

According to the Claremont Profile Method it represents textual family K^{r} in Luke 1 and Luke 20. In Luke 10 no profile was made. It creates textual cluster with 1059.

== History ==
Scrivener dated the manuscript to the 12th century, Gregory to the 13th century. Currently the manuscript is dated by the INTF to the 13th century.

The manuscript was bought from Spyridion Lambros from Athens in 1859 (along with the codex 688 and 690).

It was added to the list of New Testament manuscript by Scrivener (593) and Gregory (689).

It was examined by Bloomfied and Dean Burgon.

The manuscript is currently housed at the British Library (Add MS 22737) in London.

== See also ==
- List of New Testament minuscules
- Biblical manuscript
- Textual criticism
