= Minuscule 578 =

- New Testament manuscript
- Text: Gospels
- Date: 1361
- Script: Greek
- Now at: Bibliothèque municipale d'Arras
- Size: 20.5 cm by 14 cm
- Type: Byzantine
- Category: V

Minuscule 578 (in the Gregory-Aland numbering), ε 453 (in the Soden numbering), is a Greek minuscule manuscript of the New Testament, on paper. It is dated by a colophon to the year 1361. The manuscript has complex contents.

== Description ==
The codex contains the text of the four Gospels on 241 paper leaves (size 20.5 cm by 14 cm). The writing is in one column per page, 25-26 lines per page.

It contains Prolegomena, tables of the κεφαλαια are placed before every Gospel, numerals of the κεφαλαια at the margin, the τιτλοι, the Ammonian Sections (in Mark 241 – 16:20), (without Eusebian Canons), lectionary markings at the margin, (incipits were added by a later hand) Synaxarion, and Menologion.

== Text ==
The Greek text of the codex is a representative of the Byzantine text-type. According to Hermann von Soden it is close to the textual groups 1216 and 16. Aland placed it in Category V. According to the Claremont Profile Method it belongs to the group 16 Luke 1 and Luke 10, but in Luke 20 to the group 1167. It is creates textual pair with the codex 217 in Luke 1 and Luke 10.

The Pericope Adulterae (John 7:53-8:11) was omitted by the first scribe, and in the 16th century a later hand added the leaves with the text of pericope.

== History ==
The manuscript was written by Johannes, a scribe.

Scrivener labelled it by 872. Gregory saw the manuscript in 1884.

Currently the manuscript is housed at the library of the Bibliothèque municipale (Sect. Med., H. 446) in Arras.

== See also ==
- List of New Testament minuscules
- Biblical manuscript
- Textual criticism
