= Guillaume Budé =

French scholar, humanist and administrator (1467–1540)

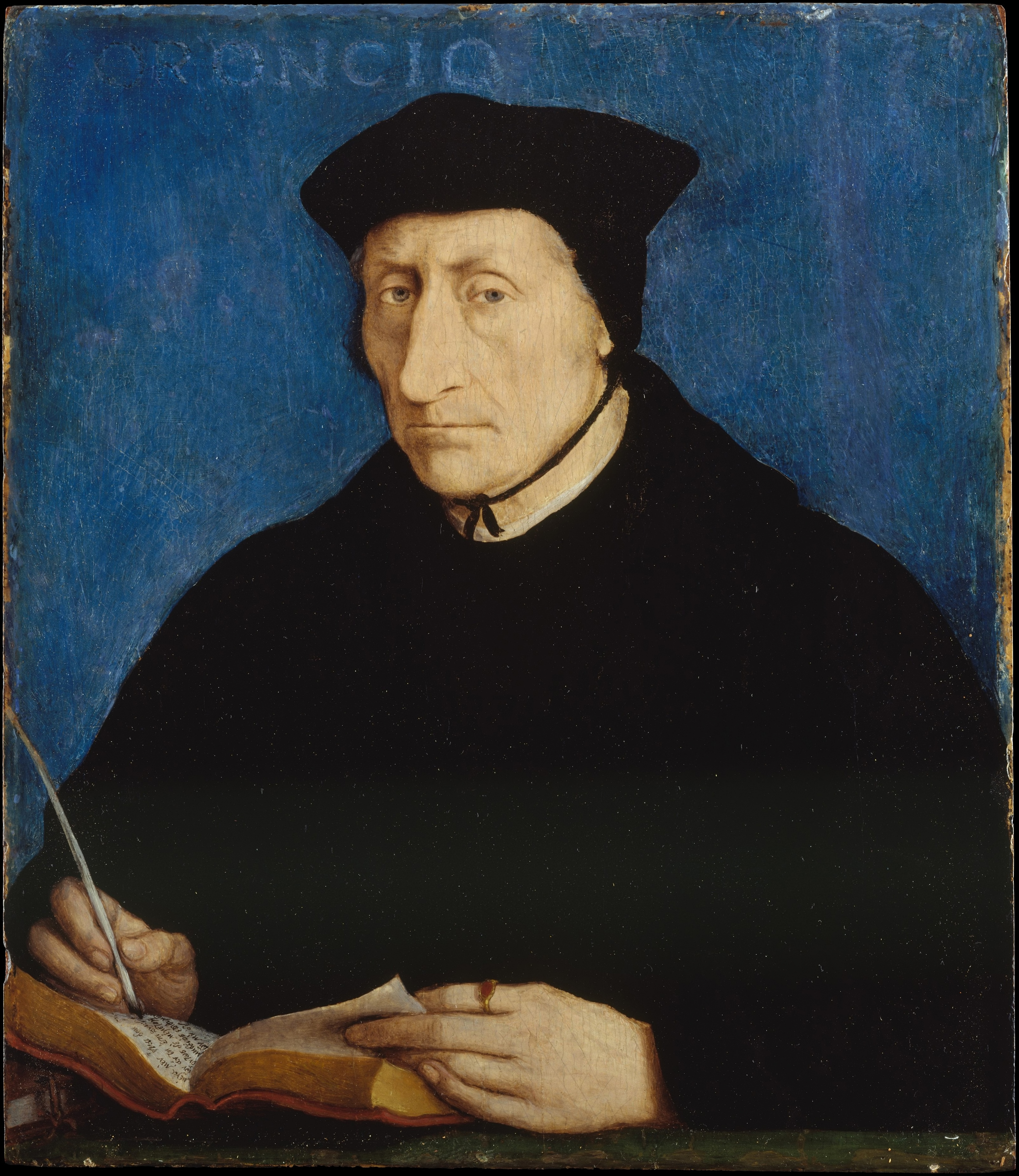
- Guillaume Budé, c. 1536 portrait by Jean Clouet
- Born: January 26, 1467; Paris, Kingdom of France
- Died: August 20, 1540 (aged 73); Paris, Kingdom of France
- Other name: William Budaeus

Education
- Education: University of Orléans
- Academic advisors: Janus Lascaris; George Hermonymus

Philosophical work
- Era: Renaissance philosophy
- Region: Western philosophy
- School: Renaissance humanism
- Institutions: Collegium Trilingue
- Notable students: Melchior Wolmar; John Colet
- Main interests: Law

Guillaume Budé (French: [ɡijom byde]; Latinized as Guilielmus Budaeus; January 26, 1467 – August 20, 1540) was a French scholar and humanist. He was involved in the founding of Collegium Trilingue, which later became the Collège de France.

Budé was also the first keeper of the royal library at the Palace of Fontainebleau, which was later moved to Paris, where it became the Bibliothèque nationale de France. He was an ambassador to Rome and held several important judicial and civil administrative posts.

== Life ==
Budé was born in Paris. He went to the University of Orléans to study law, but for several years, having ample means, he led an idle and dissipated life. When about twenty-four years of age, he was seized with a sudden passion for study, and made rapid progress, particularly in Latin and Ancient Greek.

The work which gained him greatest reputation was his De Asse et Partibus Eius (1514), a treatise on ancient coins and measures. He was held in high esteem by Francis I, who was persuaded by him, and by Jean du Bellay, Bishop of Narbonne, to found the Collegium Trilingue (afterwards the Collège de France) and the library at Fontainebleau, which was removed to Paris and was the origin of the Bibliothèque Nationale.

He also induced Francis to refrain from prohibiting printing in France, which had been advised by the Sorbonne in 1533. Earlier, he had been sent by Louis XII to Rome as ambassador to Leo X, and in 1522 was appointed maître des requêtes and was several times prévôt des marchands.

== Death ==
Before his death in Paris, he requested to be buried at night, and his widow's open profession of Protestantism at Geneva (where she retired after his death), caused him to be suspected of leanings towards Calvinism.

Sections of his correspondence with Erasmus also suggest this religious inclination. At the time of the St. Bartholomew's Day Massacre, the members of his family were obliged to flee from France. Some took refuge in Switzerland, where they worthily upheld the traditions of their house, while others settled in Swedish Pomerania under the name Budde or Buddeus (see Johann Franz Buddeus).

Budé was also the author of Annotationes in XXIV. libros Pandectarum (1508), which, by the application of philology and history, had a great influence on the study of Roman law, and of Commentarii linguae Graecae (1529), an extensive collection of lexicographical notes, which contributed greatly to the study of Greek literature in France. Epistolae (1520, 8vo) is a collection that contains only a small part of the voluminous correspondence of Bude, written in Greek with remarkable purity.

Budé corresponded with the most learned men of his time, amongst them Erasmus, who called him the "marvel of France", and Thomas More. He wrote with equal facility in Greek and Latin.

== Works ==
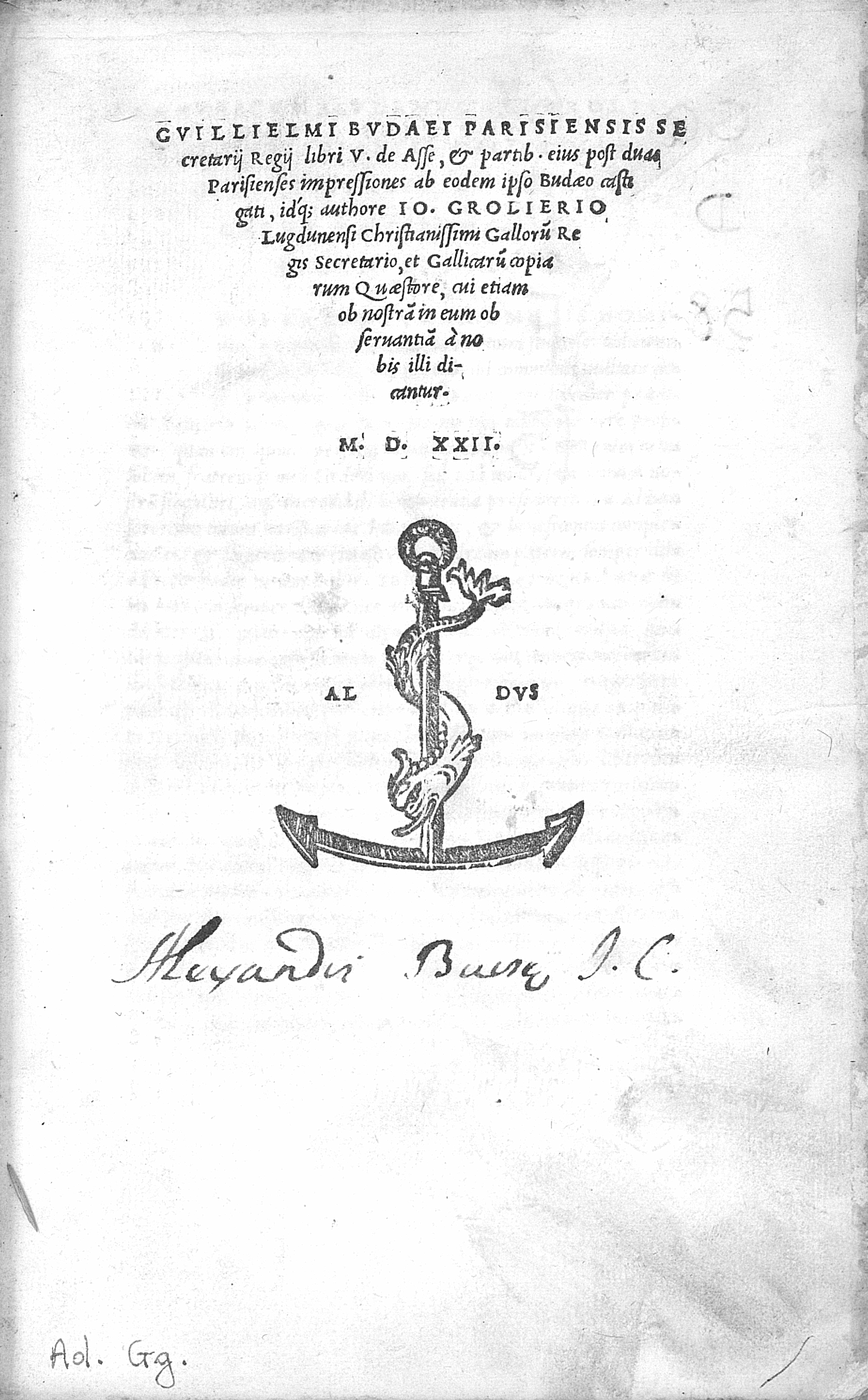
Libri V de Asse et partibus ejus, 1522

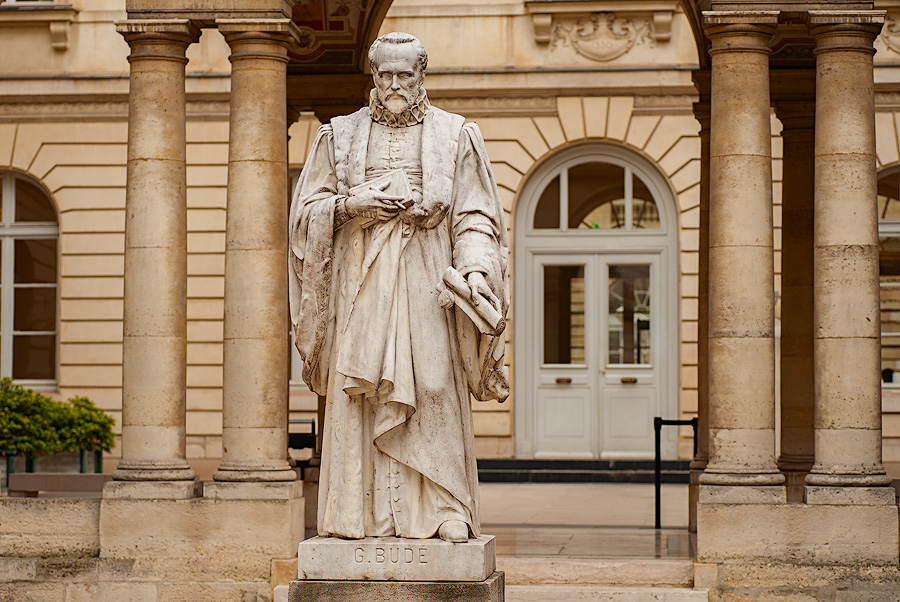
Statue de Guillaume Budé at the Collège de France, Paris

- Translations from Plutarch, from 1502 to 1505
- Annotationes in XXIV libros Pandectarum, Paris, 1508
  - Annotationes in quattuor et viginti pendectarum libros. Paris, Josse Bade, 1532
  - Annotationes in XXIV Pandectarum libros (in Latin). Lyon: Sébastien Gryphius. 1541.
  - Annotationes in XXIV Pandectarum libros (in Latin). Lyon: Sébastien Gryphius. 1546.
- De contemptu rerum fortuitarum libri tres, Paris, 1520
- Epistolae, in 8vo, 1520
- Libri V de Asse et partibus ejus (in Latin). Venice: Aldo Manuzio, eredi & Andrea Torresano. 1522.
- Summaire ou Epitome du livre de Asse, Paris, 1522
- De studio litterarum recte et commode instituendo, Paris, 1527
- Commentarii linguae graecae, Paris, 1529
  - Commentarii Linguae Græcae, Gulielmo Budaeo, consiliario Regio, supplicumque libellorum in Regia magistro, auctore. Ab eodem accuratè recogniti, atque amplius tertia parte aucti. Ex officina Roberti Stephani typographi Regii, Parisiis, 1548
- De philologia, Paris, 1530
- Libellorumque magistri in praetorio, altera aeditio annotationum in pandectas, Paris, Josse Bade, 1532
- De Studio Literarum Recte Et Commode Instituendo. Item Eiusdem G. Budaei De Philologia Lib. II. Basileae, apud Ioan. Walderum, martio 1533
- De transitu Hellenismi ad Christianismum libri tres, Paris, Robert Estienne, 1534
- De l'institution du prince, in-folio, 1547
- Opera omnia, 4 vol. in-folio, Basel, 1557

== Family ==
Guillaume was the son of Jean Budé (d. 1502) and Catherine Le Picart. He married Roberte Le Lieur when she was about 15 years old. Their children included:

- Dreux Budé (d. 1547), married Marthe Paillart
- François (d. 1550)

== See also ==
- Greek scholars in the Renaissance
