= Samuel Thomas Bloomfield =

Samuel Thomas Bloomfield (19 January 1783 – 28 September 1869) was an English clergyman and Biblical textual critic. His Greek New Testament was widely used in England and the United States.

== Life ==
His surname was also spelled Blomfield or Blumfield. He was the son of Samuel Blomfield of Boston, Lincolnshire, and was educated at Wisbech and Sidney Sussex College, Cambridge, where he was a pensioner from 29 June 1804. He matriculated in 1806, and graduate B.A. in 1808, M.A. in 1811, and D.D. in 1829. He was ordained as a priest of the Church of England in December 1808 and was vicar of Bisbrooke, Rutland, from 1814 to 1869. From 1847 Bloomfield received an annual pension from the Civil List "in consideration of his services and acquirements as a scholar and divine". He died at Holme House, Wandsworth Common.

== Works ==
Bloomfield published Recensio Synoptica, and doctrinal Annotations on the New Testament (in 8 volumes, 1826). He also edited a Greek and English lexicon to the New Testament, revised and enlarged from Robinson's lexicon (1829); and a translation of Thucydides (3 volumes, 1829).

- The Greek New Testament (Vol 1 - Gospels & Acts) and (Vol 2 - Epistles & Revelation), Philadelphia 1854
- Critical Annotations: Additional and Supplementary on the New Testament, London 1860
- Recensio Synoptica Annotationis Sacrae, 1826-1828
