= Manuscripts of the Austrian National Library =

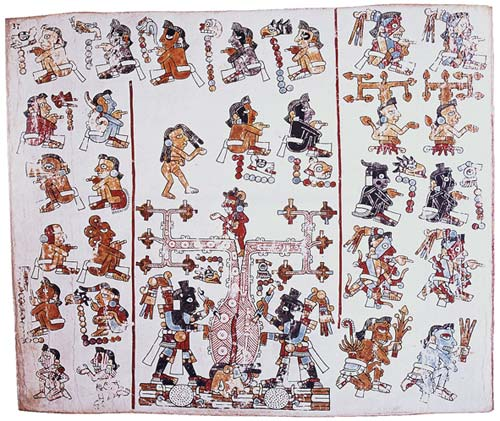
F.37v of Codex Vindobonensis Mexicanus I.

The Department of Manuscripts and Rare Books of the Austrian National Library in Vienna was formed in April 2008 by merging the departments of "Manuscripts, Autographs, and Closed Collections" and of "Incunabula, Old and Valuable Books".

Within the library, the manuscripts are given a signature of Cod. plus an abbreviation of the applicable grouping (mostly by language; in the case of the Japanese and Chinese collection, the more generic Cim., for cimelia "heirlooms, treasures" is used). When the context does not make clear that the manuscript is from Vienna, the abbreviation Cod. Vindob. is used, short for Codex Vindobonensis (after Vindobona, the ancient Roman name of Vienna).

== Manuscript groupings ==
The manuscripts are grouped as follows:

- European manuscripts:
  - Cod. 1-15000 (old holdings)
  - Cod. Ser. n.1-50178 = Codices Series nova - new acquisitions from about 1870
- Armenian manuscripts: Cod. Armen. 1-34 = Codices Armeniaci
- Ethiopian manuscripts: Cod. Aethiop. 1-45 = Codices Aethiopici
- Chinese manuscripts: Cim. Sin. 1-390 (gaps in the sequence of shelfmarks: Cim. Sin. 1-24, 163, 215, 384–390) = Cimelia Sinica
- Georgian manuscripts: Cod. Georg. 1-5 = Codices Georgici
- Greek manuscripts:
  - Cod. Jur. gr. 1-18 = Codices Juridici graeci
  - Cod. Hist. gr. 1-130 = Codices Historici graeci
  - Cod. Phil. Gr. 1-347 = Codices Philologici et Philosophici graeci
  - Cod. Suppl. gr. 1-201 = Codices Supplementum graecum. 22 Manuscripts of this fond were moved to National Library of Naples.
  - Cod. Theol. gr. 1-337 = Codices Theologici graeci
- Manuscript fragments: Fragm. = Fragmenta
- Hebrew manuscripts: Cod. Hebr. 1-244 = Codices Hebraici
- Indian manuscripts:
  - Cod. Ind. 1-171 = Codices Indici
  - Cod. Sanskr. 1-33 = Codices Sanskritici
- Japanese manuscripts: Cim. Jap. 3, 9, 18, 21, 51 = Cimelia Japonica
- Coptic manuscripts: Cod. Copt. 1-18 = Codices Coptici
- Manuscripts and art albums: Cod. Min. 1-143 = Codices Miniati
- Mexican manuscripts: Cod. Mexic. 1-12 = Codices Mexicani
- Mongolian manuscripts: Cod. Mongol. 1-2 = Codices Mongolici
- Oriental manuscripts:
  - Cod. A. F. 1-557 = Alter Fond (Old grouping)
  - Cod. N. F. 1-479 = Neuer Fond (New grouping)
  - Cod. Mixt. 1-1943 = Codices Mixti (Mixed languages)
  - Cod. H. O. 1-231 = Codices Historia Osmanica (Ottoman history)
  - Cod. Gl. 1-250 = Codices of the Glaser collection
- Slavic manuscripts: Cod. Slav. 1-236 (229-233 blank) = Codices Slavici
- Syrian manuscripts: Cod. Syr. 1-11 = Codices Syriaci

== Notable manuscripts ==
The following is a list of especially notable manuscripts kept in Vienna.

=== European manuscripts ===
- Codex Vindobonensis 387, a Carolingian astronomical compendium
- Codex Vindobonensis 521, a 13th-century manuscript of Adam of Bremen's Gesta
- Codex Vindobonensis 751, 9th-century collections of the letters of Saint Boniface
- Codex Vindobonensis 795, a 9th-century manuscript with letters and treatises of Alcuin
- Cod. Vindob. 1856, the Black Hours of Galeazzo Maria Sforza
- Cod. Vindob. 1857, the Hours of Mary of Burgundy
- Cod. Vindob. 1897, the Hours of James IV of Scotland
- Cod. Vindob. 1908, the Hours of Maria d’Harcourt
- Codex Vindobonensis B 11093, a 15th-century combat treatise

==== Latin New Testament ====
- Codex Vindobonensis Lat. 502, 7th-century manuscript of the Gospels
- Codex Vindobonensis Lat. 1235, 6th-century manuscript of the Gospels

=== Greek manuscripts ===
- Cod. Vindob. med. gr. 1, the Vienna Dioscurides, Constantinople, c. 512.

==== Codices Philologici et Philosophici graecis ====
- Codex Vindobonensis Philos. 2, a manuscripts of the treatise "On the Soul" of Aristotle
- Codex Vindobonensis Philos. 75, a manuscripts of the treatise "On the Soul" of Aristotle
- Codex Vindobonensis Philos. 157, a manuscripts of the treatise "On the Soul" of Aristotle

Codex Vindobonensis phil. Gr. 65 of the 15th cent. This is an Anonymous Arithmetic and Geometry (Logisticae and Geodaisia)

==== Codices Theologici graeci ====
- Vienna Genesis, also known as Codex Vindobonensis Theol. Gr. 31, with two leaves of Codex Petropolitanus Purpureus
- Minuscule 123, also known as Codex Vindobonensis Theol. Gr. 240, a minuscule manuscript of the New Testament, designated by 123 in the Gregory-Åland numbering
- Minuscule 124, also known as Codex Vindobonensis Theol. Gr. 188, a minuscule manuscript of the New Testament, designated by 124 in the Gregory-Åland numbering
- Minuscule 125, also known as Codex Vindobonensis Theol. Gr. 50, a minuscule manuscript of the New Testament, designated by 125 in the Gregory-Åland numbering
- Minuscule 218, also known as Codex Vindobonensis Theol. Gr. 23, a minuscule manuscript of the New Testament, designated by 218 in the Gregory-Åland numbering
- Minuscule 219, also known as Codex Vindobonensis Theol. Gr. 321, a minuscule manuscript of the New Testament, designated by 219 in the Gregory-Åland numbering
- Minuscule 220, also known as Codex Vindobonensis Theol. Gr. 337, a minuscule manuscript of the New Testament, designated by 220 in the Gregory-Åland numbering
- Minuscule 404, also known as Codex Vindobonensis Theol. Gr. 313, a minuscule manuscript of the New Testament, designated by 313 in the Gregory-Åland numbering
- Minuscule 421, also known as Codex Vindobonensis Theol. Gr. 210, a minuscule manuscript of the New Testament, designated by 421 in the Gregory-Åland numbering
- Minuscule 424, also known as Codex Vindobonensis Theol. Gr. 302, a minuscule manuscript of the New Testament, designated by 424 in the Gregory-Åland numbering
- Minuscule 425, also known as Codex Vindobonensis Theol. Gr. 221, a minuscule manuscript of the New Testament, designated by 425 in the Gregory-Åland numbering
- Minuscule 434, also known as Codex Vindobonensis Theol. Gr. 71, a minuscule manuscript of the New Testament, designated by 434 in the Gregory-Åland numbering

==== Codices Juridici graeci ====
- Lectionary 45, also known as Codex Vindobonensis Jur. gr. 5, a lectionary manuscript of the New Testament, designated by 45 in the Gregory-Åland numbering, 10th century

==== Papyri ====
- Pap. Vindobonensis gr. 2325, known as the Fayyum Fragment, Apocrypha of the New Testament, 3rd century
- Pap. Vindobonensis gr. 17973, manuscript of the New Testament, designated by 𝔓^{33} in the Gregory-Åland numbering
- Pap. Vindobonensis gr. 39784, manuscript of the New Testament, designated by 𝔓^{34} in the Gregory-Åland numbering
- Pap. Vindobonensis K. 7377. 7384. 7386. 7426. 7541-7548. 7731. 7912. 7914, manuscript of the New Testament, designated by 𝔓^{41} in the Gregory-Åland numbering
- Pap. Vindobonensis K. 8706, Greek-Coptic manuscript of the New Testament, designated by 𝔓^{42} in the Gregory-Åland numbering
- Pap. Vindobonensis G. 31974, manuscript of the New Testament, designated by 𝔓^{45} in the Gregory-Åland numbering
- Pap. Vindobonensis gr. 42417, manuscript of the New Testament, designated by 𝔓^{116} in the Gregory-Åland numbering

==== Codices Supplementum graecum ====
- Minuscule 3, also known as Codex Vindobonensis Suppl. gr. 52, a minuscule manuscript of the New Testament, designated by 3 in the Gregory-Åland numbering

=== Codices Mexicani ===
- Codex Vindobonensis Mexicanus I, known also as Codex C, a 14th-century Mesoamerican treatise

== See also ==
- Papyrus Collection of the Austrian National Library
