= Minuscule 220 =

- New Testament manuscript
- Name: Vind. Ness. 180
- Text: Gospels
- Date: 13th century
- Script: Greek
- Now at: Austrian National Library
- Size: 9.7 cm by 6.8 cm
- Type: Byzantine
- Category: V
- Hand: very small letters
- Note: marginalia

Minuscule 220 is a Greek minuscule manuscript of the New Testament, made of parchment. It is designated by the siglum 220 in the Gregory-Aland numbering of New Testament manuscripts, and ε 457 in the von Soden numbering of New Testament manuscripts. Using the study of comparative writing styles (palaeography), it has been assigned to the 13th century. It has complex contents and marginal notes.

== Description ==
The manuscript is a codex (precursor to the modern book format), containing the complete text of the four Gospels, on 303 parchment leaves (sized 9.7 cm by 6.8 cm). It is written in one column per page, 22 lines per page, in very small letters.

The text is divided according to the chapters (known as κεφαλαια / kephalaia), whose numbers are given in the margin, and their titles (known as τιτλοι / titloi) written at the top of the pages. There is also a division according to the Ammonian Sections (234 in Mark, the last in 16:10), but there are no references to the Eusebian Canons. It contains lectionary markings in the margin for liturgical reading, and a synaxaria.

== Text ==
The Greek text of the codex is considered to be a representative of the Byzantine text-type. Biblical scholar Kurt Aland placed it in Category V of his New Testament manuscript classification system. Category V manuscripts are described as "manuscripts with a purely or predominantly Byzantine text." According to the Claremont Profile Method (a specific analysis of textual data), it represents the textual family Π in Luke 1, Luke 10, and Luke 20.

== History ==
The earliest history of the manuscript is unknown. It was examined by the Jesuit scholar Francis K. Alter. Alter used it in his edition of the Greek text of the New Testament. Biblical scholar Caspar René Gregory saw it in 1887.

It is currently dated by the INTF to the 13th century. It is presently housed at the Austrian National Library (shelf number Theol. Gr. 337), in Vienna.

== See also ==
- Minuscule 221
- Minuscule 219
- List of New Testament minuscules
- Biblical manuscript
- Textual criticism
