= Minuscule 218 =

- New Testament manuscript
- Text: Old Testament, New Testament †
- Date: 13th century
- Script: Greek
- Now at: Austrian National Library
- Size: 32 cm by 23 cm
- Type: Byzantine, Caesarean
- Category: V, III
- Note: peculiar readings

Minuscule 218 (in the Gregory-Aland numbering), δ 300 (Soden), is a Greek minuscule manuscript of the Old Testament (Septuaginta) and New Testament, on parchment. It is one of the few manuscripts with the complete Greek Bible. Palaeographically it has been assigned to the 13th century. It has marginalia.

== Description ==
The codex contains the text of the both Testaments, on 623 parchment leaves (size 32 cm by 23 cm), with some lacunae (Rev. 13:5-14:8; 15:7-17:2; 18:10-19:15; 20:7-22:21). The text is written in two columns per page, 50-52 lines per page. The text of New Testament is on leaves 486-623.

The order of books: Acts, Catholic epistles, Pauline epistles. Epistle to the Hebrews is placed between 2 Thessalonians and 1 Timothy.

The text is divided according to the κεφαλαια (chapters), whose numbers are given at the margin, and their τιτλοι (titles of chapters) at the top of the pages. The text of the Gospels has also another division according to the smaller Ammonian Sections, but without references to the Eusebian Canons.

It contains tables of the κεφαλαια (tables of contents) before each book, subscriptions at the end of each book, the Euthalian Apparatus (in Acts, Cath., and Paul), the Eusebian Canons absent.

== Text ==
The Greek text of the New Testament of this codex is a representative of the Byzantine text-type (except epistles). Aland placed it in Category III in the Catholic and Pauline epistles and in Category V in rest of New Testament books. It contains many peculiar readings.

According to the Claremont Profile Method it represents textual family K^{x} in Luke 1 and Luke 20. In Luke 10 no profile was made. It creates textual cluster with minuscule 187.

== History ==
The manuscript was brought from Constantinople to Vienna by Busbecq (like codex 123 and 434). It was examined by Treschov, Alter and Birch. C. R. Gregory saw it in 1887.

It is currently housed at the Austrian National Library (Theol. Gr. 23), at Vienna.

== See also ==
- List of New Testament minuscules
- Biblical manuscript
- Textual criticism
