= Minuscule 108 =

- New Testament manuscript
- Name: Codex Neapol.
- Text: Gospels
- Date: 11th century
- Script: Greek
- Now at: Biblioteca Nazionale
- Size: 31.8 cm by 23.7 cm
- Type: Byzantine text-type
- Category: V
- Note: marginalia

Minuscule 108 (in the Gregory-Aland numbering), A^{144} (Soden), is a Greek minuscule manuscript of the New Testament, on parchment leaves. Paleographically it has been assigned to the 11th century. It has complex contents with some marginalia.

== Description ==
The codex contains a complete text of the four Gospels with a commentary on 426 parchment leaves (31.8 cm by 23.7 cm). The text is written stichometrically in one column per page. The initial letters in gold.

The text is divided according to the κεφαλαια (chapters), whose numbers are given at the margin, with the τιτλοι (titles of chapters) at the top of the pages. There is also a division according to the Ammonian Sections (in Mark 233 sections, the last in 16:8), with references to the Eusebian Canons.

It contains the Epistula ad Carpianum, Eusebian Canon tables, prolegomena, lists of the κεφαλαια (lists of contents) before each Gospel, subscriptions at the end of each Gospel, numbers of στιχοι, and pictures (John Evangelist with Prochorus).

== Text ==
The Greek text of the codex is a representative of the Byzantine text-type. Aland placed it in Category V.

It was not examined by Claremont Profile Method.

It has not the Pericope Adulterae (John 7:53-8:11).

== History ==
It once belonged to Jan Parrhassius, then to Antonio Seripandi, then to the monastery of St. John de Carbonaria in Naples. It was examined by Treschov, Birch, Alter, Scholz, and Burgon. Alter used it in his edition of the Greek text of the New Testament. C. R. Gregory saw it in 1887.

Formerly it was held at the Imperial Library in Vienna (Suppl. Gr. 6). Currently it is housed at the Biblioteca Nazionale Vittorio Emanuele III (Cod. Neapol. ex Vind. 3) at Naples.

== See also ==
- List of New Testament minuscules
- Biblical manuscript
- Textual criticism
- Lectionary 138
