= Minuscule 78 =

- New Testament manuscript
- Name: Codex Nicolae Jancovich de Vadass
- Text: Gospels
- Date: 12th century
- Script: Greek
- Now at: National Széchényi Library
- Size: 20.8 cm by 15 cm
- Type: Byzantine text-type
- Category: V
- Note: full marginalia

Minuscule 78 (in the Gregory-Aland numbering), ε 1209 (von Soden), is a Greek minuscule manuscript of the New Testament, on parchment leaves. Palaeographically it has been assigned to the 12th century. It has complex contents and full marginalia.

== Description ==
The codex contains complete text of the four Gospels with a commentary on 296 leaves (size 20.8 cm by 15 cm). The text is written in one column per page, 22 lines per page. The initial letters in red.

The text is divided according to the κεφαλαια (chapters), whose numbers are given at the margin, with the τιτλοι (titles of chapters) at the top of the pages.

It contains the Eusebian Tables, tables of the κεφαλαια (tables of contents) before each Gospel, lectionary markings at the margin (for liturgical use), synaxaria, and pictures.

== Text ==
The Greek text of the codex is a representative of the Byzantine text-type. Hermann von Soden classified it to the textual family K^{x}. Aland placed it in Category V. According to the Claremont Profile Method it represents the textual cluster 127 in Luke 1 and Luke 20. In Luke 10 no profile was made. It is close to 1052.

== History ==
The manuscript was once in the library of King Matthias Corvinus (as codex 77). In 1527 the library was scattered by Turks. About 1686 the codex fell into the hands of S. B., then of J. G. Carpzov of Leipzig. It was collated by C. F. Boerner.

It is currently housed at the Országos Széchényi Könyvtár (Cod. Graec. 1), at Budapest.

== See also ==
- List of New Testament minuscules
- Biblical manuscript
- Textual criticism
