= Minuscule 222 =

- New Testament manuscript
- Text: Gospels †
- Date: 14th century
- Script: Greek
- Now at: Austrian National Library
- Size: 21.8 cm by 15.4 cm
- Category: none

Minuscule 222 (in the Gregory-Aland numbering), A^{404} (Soden), is a Greek minuscule manuscript of the New Testament, on paper. Palaeographically it has been assigned to the 14th century. The manuscript has not survived in complete condition.

== Description ==
The codex contains a complete text of the four Gospels, on 346 paper leaves (size 21.8 cm by 15.4 cm), with some lacunae (Matthew 1:1-6:19; John 14:2-16:4; 16:7-fin). It is written in one column per page, 24-32 lines per page.

It contains a commentary (Victor's in Mark).

Aland did not place the Greek text of the codex in any Category. It was not examined by the Claremont Profile Method. In result his textual character is unknown.

== History ==
The manuscript was brought by Busbecq from Constantinople (along with Minuscule 123 and 221). C. R. Gregory saw it in 1887.

It is currently housed at the Austrian National Library (Theol. Gr. 180), at Vienna.

== See also ==
- List of New Testament minuscules
- Biblical manuscript
- Textual criticism
