= Minuscule 224 =

- New Testament manuscript
- Text: Gospel of Matthew
- Date: 12th century
- Script: Greek
- Now at: Biblioteca Nazionale Vittorio Emanuele III
- Size: 14 cm by 11.8 cm
- Type: Byzantine
- Category: V
- Note: marginalia

Minuscule 224 (in the Gregory-Aland numbering), ε 1212 (Soden), is a Greek minuscule manuscript of the New Testament, on parchment. Paleographically it has been assigned to the 12th century. It has marginalia.

== Description ==
The codex contains only the text of the Gospel of Matthew, on 97 parchment leaves (size 14 cm by 11.8 cm). The text is written in one column per page, 19 lines per page.

The text is divided according to the κεφαλαια (chapters), whose numbers are given at the margin, and the τιτλοι (titles of chapters) at the top of the pages. There is also a division according to the Ammonian Sections, but without references to the Eusebian Canons.

It contains the table of the κεφαλαια (table of contents) before the Gospel, lectionary markings at the margin (for liturgical reading), synaxaria, Menologion, and subscriptions at the end of the Gospel.

== Text ==
The Greek text of the codex is a representative of the Byzantine text-type. Aland placed it in Category V.

== History ==
According to Gregory the manuscript was written in Calabria. In 1716 it was in Naples and belonged to Eusebius Caraccioli. It was examined by Treschow and Alter. Alter used it in his edition of the Greek text of the New Testament. C. R. Gregory saw it in 1887.

Formerly it was held at the Imperial Library at Vienna (Suppl. Gr. 97). It is currently housed at the Biblioteca Nazionale (Cod. Neapol. ex Vind. 10), at Naples.

== See also ==
- List of New Testament minuscules
- Biblical manuscript
- Textual criticism
