= Minuscule 187 =

- New Testament manuscript
- Text: Gospels
- Date: 12th century
- Script: Greek
- Now at: Laurentian Library
- Size: 20.1 cm by 16 cm
- Type: Byzantine text-type
- Category: V
- Note: marginalia

Minuscule 187 (in the Gregory-Aland numbering), ε 222 (Soden), is a Greek minuscule manuscript of the New Testament, on parchment. Palaeographically it has been assigned to the 12th century. It has marginalia.

== Description ==
The codex contains a complete text of the four Gospels on 212 thick parchment leaves (size 20.1 cm by 16 cm). The text is written in one column per page, in 25 lines per page, the capital letters in gold.

The text is divided according to the κεφαλαια (chapters), whose numbers are given at the margin, and the τιτλοι (titles of chapters) at the top of the pages. There is also a division according to the Ammonian Sections (in Mark 237 Sections), (no references to the Eusebian Canons).

It contains the Epistula ad Carpianum, the Eusebian Canon tables, the tables of the κεφαλαια (tables of contents) before each Gospel, all in gold, and pictures. A peculiar kind of asterisk occurs very frequently in the text and margin.

== Text ==
The Greek text of the codex is a representative of the Byzantine text-type. Aland placed it in Category V. According to the Claremont Profile Method it belongs to the textual family K^{x} in Luke 1, Luke 10, and Luke 20. It creates textual cluster 187.

Minuscule 218 is close.

== History ==
The manuscripts was examined and described by Bandini, Birch, Scholz, and Burgon. C. R. Gregory saw it in 1886.

It is currently housed at the Laurentian Library (Plutei. VI. 23), at Florence.

== See also ==
- List of New Testament minuscules
- Biblical manuscript
- Textual criticism
