= Minuscule 132 =

- New Testament manuscript
- Text: Gospels
- Date: 12th century
- Script: Greek
- Now at: Vatican Library
- Size: 27 cm by 15.9 cm
- Type: Byzantine text-type
- Category: V
- Note: marginalia

Minuscule 132 (in the Gregory-Aland numbering), ε 208 (Soden), is a Greek minuscule manuscript of the New Testament, on parchment leaves. Palaeographically it has been assigned to the 12th century. It has complex contents and full marginalia.

== Description ==
The codex contains the text of the four Gospels on 289 parchment leaves (size 27 cm by 15.9 cm). The text is written in one column per page, 20 lines per page (size of text 12.9 by 9.8 cm). The ink is brown-black, the capital letters in red.

The text is divided according to the κεφαλαια (chapters), whose numbers are given at the margin, and their τιτλοι (titles) at the top of the pages. There is also another division according to the smaller Ammonian Sections (in Mark 233 sections, the last section in 16:8), with references to the Eusebian Canons.

It contains the Eusebian Canon tables, prolegomena, tables of the κεφαλαια (tables of contents) before each Gospel, subscriptions at the end of each of the Gospels, and pictures (in gold). The lectionary markings (for liturgical use) and incipits were added by a later hand. The Synaxarion and Menologion were added by a later hand.

== Text ==
The Greek text of the codex is a representative of the Byzantine text-type. Hermann von Soden classified it to the textual family K^{x}. Aland placed it in Category V.

According to the Claremont Profile Method it belongs to the textual cluster 127 in Luke 1, Luke 10, and Luke 20.

== History ==
The manuscript was slightly examined by Andreas Birch (about 1782). C. R. Gregory saw it in 1886.

It is currently housed at the Vatican Library (Vat. gr. 361), at Rome.

== See also ==
- List of New Testament minuscules
- Biblical manuscript
- Textual criticism
