= Minuscule 434 =

- New Testament manuscript
- Name: Vindobonensis
- Text: Gospel of Luke 1:5-6:21
- Date: 13th century
- Script: Greek
- Now at: Austrian National Library
- Size: 30 cm by 19.8 cm
- Category: none

Minuscule 434 (in the Gregory-Aland numbering), Ν^{λ48} (in the Soden numbering), is a Greek minuscule manuscript of the New Testament, on parchment. Palaeographically it has been assigned to the 13th century.

== Description ==
The codex contains only the text of the Gospel of Luke 1:5-6:21 on 424 parchment leaves (30 cm by 19.8 cm) with a catena. It is written in one column per page, in 28-30 lines per page.

Aland did not place the Greek text of the codex in any Category. It was not examined by the Claremont Profile Method.

== History ==
F. H. A. Scrivener and C. R. Gregory dated the manuscript to the 14th century. Currently it is dated by the INTF to the 13th century.

The manuscript was brought from Constantinople by Busbecq (together with the codex 218). It was examined by Birch and Scholz. The manuscript was added to the list of New Testament manuscripts by Scholz (1794–1852). C. R. Gregory saw it in 1887.

It is currently housed at the Austrian National Library (Theol. gr. 71) in Vienna.

== See also ==
- List of New Testament minuscules
- Biblical manuscript
- Textual criticism
