= Lectionary 46 =

Lectionary ℓ 46
- New Testament manuscript
- Name: Cod. Neapolitanus ex Vindob. 2
- Text: Evangelistarion
- Date: 9th-century
- Script: Greek
- Now at: Naples
- Size: 16.2 cm by 14.5 cm

Lectionary 46, designated by sigla ℓ 46 (in the Gregory-Aland numbering), is a Greek manuscript of the New Testament, on purple parchment leaves. Palaeographically, it has been assigned to the 9th century. It was formerly known as Codex Vindobonensis 2.

== Description ==
The codex contains 19 lessons from the Gospels (Evangelistarium), on 182 purple parchment leaves (16.2 cm by 14.5 cm). The lessons of the codex were red from πασχα to εις μετανοιαν. The text is written in one column per page, in 9 lines per page, 7-11 letters per line, in Greek uncial letters, in gold and silver ink. The letters are high.

There is also a Latin version.

== History ==
Formerly the manuscript belonged to the monastery B. Joh. de Carbonaria in Naples. Between 1714 and 1733 it was presented by monks to Emperor Charles VI, at that time king of Naples. It was examined by Bianchini, Treschow, Alter. Alter used it in his edition of the Greek text of the New Testament.

The manuscript is not cited in the critical editions of the Greek New Testament (UBS3).

Formerly the manuscript was held at Vienna (kais. suppl. gr. 12). Currently the codex is located in the Biblioteca Nazionale Vittorio Emanuele III, (Cod. Neapol. ex Vind. 2) in Naples.

== See also ==
- List of New Testament lectionaries
- Biblical manuscript
- Purple parchment
- Textual criticism
- Lectionary 138
