= Minuscule 125 =

- New Testament manuscript
- Name: Vind. Theol. Gr. 50
- Text: Gospels
- Date: 11th century
- Script: Greek
- Now at: Austrian National Library
- Size: 22.3 cm by 17.4 cm
- Type: Byzantine text-type
- Category: V
- Note: full marginalia

Minuscule 125 (in the Gregory-Aland numbering), ε 1028 (Von Soden numbering). It is a Greek minuscule manuscript of the New Testament on a parchment. Palaeographically it has been assigned to the 11th century. The manuscript has survived in complete condition. It has with full marginalia (completed by a later hand).

== Description ==
The manuscript contains the text of the four Gospels on 306 parchment leaves (22.3 cm by 17.4 cm). The text is written in one column per page, 23 lines per page. The capital letters are written in colour.

The text is divided according to the κεφαλαια (chapters), whose numbers are given at the margin of the text, and their τιτλοι (titles of chapters) at the top of the pages. There is also another division according to the smaller Ammonian Sections (Mark 234), with references to the Eusebian Canons (written below Ammonian Section numbers).

It contains prolegomena of Cosmas (added by a later hand), tables of the κεφαλαια (tables of contents) before each Gospel, lectionary markings (later hand) at the margin, and pictures. Subscriptions with numbers of στιχοι and numbers of verses were added at the end of each Gospel by a later hand. It has many corrections in the margin and between the lines.

== Text ==
The Greek text of the codex is a representative of the Byzantine text-type. Aland placed it to Category V.

According to the Claremont Profile Method it represents the textual family K^{x} in Luke 1 and Luke 20. In Luke 10 no profile was made.

== History ==
It was examined by Treschow, Alter, and Birch. Alter used it in his edition of the Greek text of the New Testament. C. R. Gregory saw it in 1887.

Currently the codex is located at the Austrian National Library (Theol. Gr. 60) at Vienna.

== See also ==
- List of New Testament minuscules
- Biblical manuscript
