= Minuscule 425 =

- New Testament manuscript
- Text: Acts, CE, Pauline epistles
- Date: 1330
- Script: Greek
- Now at: Austrian National Library
- Size: 22.4 cm by 17.4 cm
- Type: Byzantine text-type
- Category: V
- Hand: elegantly written

Minuscule 425 (in the Gregory-Aland numbering), α 457 (in the Soden numbering), is a Greek minuscule manuscript of the New Testament, on parchment. It is dated by a colophon to the year 1330. Formerly it was designated by 67^{a}.

== Description ==
The codex contains the text of the Acts of the Apostles, Catholic epistles, and Pauline epistles on 159 parchment leaves (22.4 cm by 17.4 cm). The Epistle to the Hebrews is placed after Epistle to Philemon. The text is written in one column per page, in 29-31 lines per page.

It contains Prolegomena, tables of the κεφαλαια (tables of contents) before each sacred book, subscriptions at the end of each book, Synaxarion, Menologion, and numbers of στιχοι at the end of each book. It is elegantly but inaccurately written.

== Text ==
The Greek text of the codex is a representative of the Byzantine text-type. Aland placed it in Category V.

== History ==
The manuscript was written by one Leo at Constantinople. It was brought from Constantinople to Vienna by Augier Busbecq together with the codex 421 and many other manuscripts. It was examined by Treschow, Alter, and Birch. Alter used it in his edition of the Greek New Testament (vol. 2, pp. 689–740). C. R. Gregory saw it in 1881.

The manuscript was added to the list of the New Testament manuscripts by Scholz (1794-1852).

The manuscript is currently housed at the Austrian National Library (Theol. gr. 221) in Vienna.

== See also ==
- List of New Testament minuscules
- Biblical manuscript
- Textual criticism
