= Minuscule 421 =

- New Testament manuscript
- Name: Vind. Caes. Ness. 303
- Text: Acts, CE, Paul
- Date: ca. 1300
- Script: Greek
- Now at: Austrian National Library
- Size: 18.8 cm by 14 cm
- Category: none
- Hand: carefully written

Minuscule 421 (in the Gregory-Aland numbering), α 259 (in Soden's numbering), is a Greek minuscule manuscript of the New Testament, on parchment. It is dated to year ca. 1300. Formerly it was designated by 64^{a} and 69^{p}. Marginal equipment is not complete.

== Description ==
The codex contains the text of the Acts of the Apostles, Catholic epistles, and Pauline epistles on 279 parchment leaves (18.8 cm by 14 cm). The text is written in one column per page, in 22 lines per page.

It contains Prolegomena, tables of the κεφαλαια (tables of contents) before each book, lectionary equipment at the margin, subscriptions at the end of each book, Synaxarion, and Menologion.

Kurt Aland did not place the Greek text of this codex in any Category.

== History ==
Gregory dated the manuscript to the 12th century.

The manuscript was carefully written by John Tarchaniota. Auger Ghislain de Busbecq brought it, together with codex 425, from Constantinople to Vienna. The manuscript was examined by Treschow, Alter, and Birch. Alter used it in his edition of NT, vol 2, pp. 789–853. C. R. Gregory saw it in 1887. Formerly it was designated by 64^{a} and 69^{p}. In 1908 Gregory gave the number 421 to it.

The manuscript is currently housed at the Austrian National Library (Theol. gr. 303) in Vienna.

== See also ==
- List of New Testament minuscules
- Biblical manuscript
- Textual criticism
