= Minuscule 127 =

- New Testament manuscript
- Text: Gospels
- Date: 11th century
- Script: Greek
- Now at: Vatican Library
- Size: 32.4 cm by 25.8 cm
- Type: Byzantine text-type
- Category: V
- Hand: neatly written
- Note: marginalia

Minuscule 127 is a Greek minuscule manuscript of the New Testament, written on parchment. It is designated by the siglum 127 in the Gregory-Aland numbering of New Testament manuscripts, and A^{124} in the von Soden numbering of New Testament manuscripts. Using the study of comparative writing styles (palaeography), it has been assigned to the 11th century. The manuscript has complex contents; the marginal notes are incomplete.

== Description ==
The manuscript is a codex (precursor to the modern book format), containing the text of the four Gospels on 378 thick parchment leaves (size 32.4 cm by 25.8 cm). The text is written in one column per page, 16 lines per page, in brown ink, with the large initials in red ink. According to biblical scholar Frederick H. A. Scrivener, the text is "neatly written", with a few corrections added by a later hand (e.g. Matthew 27:49). There is space and lines left blank for a commentary, but it was seldom written.

The text is divided according to the chapters (known as κεφαλαια / kephalai), whose numbers are given in the margin, and their titles (known as τιτλοι / titloi) written at the top of the pages. There is also another division according to the smaller Ammonian Sections (in Mark 233 sections, the last in 16:8), but there is no references to the Eusebian Canons (both early divisions of the Gospels into sections).

It contains the Epistle to Carpian, Eusebian Canon tables at the beginning, prolegomena, tables of contents (also known as κεφαλαια) before each Gospel, and lectionary markings for liturgical readings in the margin. Scrivener describes it as an "important copy".

== Text ==
The Greek text of the codex is considered a representative of the Byzantine text-type. The text-types are groups of different New Testament manuscripts which share specific or generally related readings, which then differ from each other group, and thus the conflicting readings can separate out the groups. These are then used to determine the original text as published; there are three main groups with names: Alexandrian, Western, and Byzantine, with the Byzantine comprising the vast majority of manuscripts. Biblical scholar Kurt Aland placed it in Category V of his New Testament manuscript classification system. Category V manuscripts are described as having "a purely or predominantly Byzantine text."

According to the Claremont Profile Method (a specific analysis of textual data), it creates textual cluster 127. In chapters 1, 10, and 20 of the Gospel of Luke, its text is close to minuscule 132.

Some notable readings

Mark 2:18

οἱ δὲ σοὶ (Yours however) - 127. B^{c} 102. 565. sax
οἱ δὲ μαθηταὶ σου (Your disciples however) - א B^{*} Δ 28. c al pc
οἱ δὲ σοὶ μαθηταὶ (Your disciples however) - Majority of manuscripts

Mark 12:28

ἐντολή πρώτη πάντων (commandment first of all) - 127. א B C L U Δ 33. 108. 131. co sy^{h} eth
πρώτη πάντων ἐντολή (first commandment of all) -

== History ==
The manuscript was examined by scholar Andreas Birch in about 1782. Biblical scholar C. R. Gregory saw the manuscript in 1886. The manuscript is currently housed at the Vatican Library (shelf number Vat. gr. 349), in Rome.

== See also ==
- List of New Testament minuscules
- Biblical manuscript
- Textual criticism
