= Minuscule 404 =

- New Testament manuscript
- Name: Vindobonensis, Gr. theol. 313
- Text: Acts, Paul
- Date: 13th century
- Script: Greek
- Now at: Austrian National Library
- Size: 17 cm by 12.1 cm
- Type: Byzantine text-type
- Category: V

Minuscule 404 (in the Gregory-Aland numbering), α 467 (in Soden's numbering), is a Greek minuscule manuscript of the New Testament, on parchment. Paleographically it has been assigned to the 13th century. The manuscript has complex contents. Formerly it was designated by the symbols 63^{a} and 68^{p}.

== Description ==
The codex contains a complete text of the Acts of the Apostles, Catholic epistles, and Pauline epistles (Epistle to the Hebrews is placed between 2 Thessalonians and 1 Timothy), on 157 parchment leaves (17 cm by 12.1 cm). It is written in one column per page, in 26 lines per page.

It contains Prolegomena, tables of the κεφαλαια (tables of contents) before each book, Synaxarion, subscriptions at the end of each book, numbers of στιχοι, notes to the Catholic epistles, and scholia.

== Text ==
The Greek text of the codex is a representative of the Byzantine text-type. Aland placed it in Category V.

== History ==
The manuscript once belonged to John Sambucky (together with codex 124). It was presented to Octavio Ferrari in Milano in 1562. It was examined by Treschow, Alter, Andreas Birch, and Burgon. Alter used it in his edition of the Greek New Testament (vol. 2, pp. 741–788). Birch collated some of its readings. C. R. Gregory saw it in 1887.

The manuscript was added to the list of the New Testament manuscripts by Scholz (1794-1852).

Formerly it was designated by the symbols 63^{a} and 68^{p}. In 1908 Gregory gave the number 404 to it.

The manuscript is currently housed at the Austrian National Library (Theol. gr. 313) in Vienna.

== See also ==
- List of New Testament minuscules
- Biblical manuscript
- Textual criticism
