= Minuscule 123 =

- New Testament manuscript
- Name: Codex Vindobonensis Theol. Gr. 240
- Text: Gospels
- Date: 11th century
- Script: Greek
- Found: 1562 Busbeck
- Now at: Austrian National Library
- Size: 20.8 cm by 15.3 cm
- Type: Byzantine text-type
- Category: V
- Note: incomplete marginalia

Minuscule 123 (in the Gregory-Aland numbering), ε 174 (Von Soden numbering), is a Greek minuscule manuscript of the New Testament on a parchment. Palaeographically it has been assigned to the 11th century. It has complex contents with some marginalia.

== Description ==
The codex contains a complete text of the four Gospels on 328 thick parchment leaves (20.8 cm by 15.3 cm). The text is written in one column per page, 18 lines per page.

The text is divided according to the κεφαλαια (chapters), whose numbers are given at the margin, and their τιτλοι (titles of chapters) at the top of the pages. There is also a division according to the smaller Ammonian Sections (in Mark 241 – 16:20), but without references to the Eusebian Canons.

It contains the Epistula ad Carpianum, the Eusebian Canon tables, Prolegomena, tables of the κεφαλαια (tables of contents) before each Gospel, pictures, and subscriptions at the end of each Gospel.

== Text ==
The Greek text of the codex is a representative of the Byzantine text-type. Hermann von Soden classified it to the textual family K^{x}. Kurt Aland places it in Category V.

According to the Claremont Profile Method it represents textual family K^{x} in Luke 1, Luke 10, and Luke 20.

Some corrections were made by another hand.

== History ==
The manuscript was brought from Constantinople by the ambassador Augier de Busbeck in 1562 (along with Minuscule 221 and 222).

It was examined by Treschow, Alter, Birch. Alter used it in his edition of the Greek text of the New Testament. C. R. Gregory saw it in 1887.

Currently the codex is located at the Austrian National Library (Theol. Gr. 240) at Vienna.

== See also ==
- List of New Testament minuscules
- Biblical manuscripts
