= Minuscule 77 =

- New Testament manuscript
- Name: Vindob. Theol. Gr. 154
- Text: Gospels
- Date: 11th century
- Script: Greek
- Now at: Austrian National Library
- Size: 24 cm by 18.5 cm
- Type: Byzantine text-type
- Category: V
- Hand: very neat

Minuscule 77 (in the Gregory-Aland numbering), A^{143} (von Soden), is a Greek minuscule manuscript of the New Testament, on parchment leaves. Palaeographically it has been assigned to the 11th century. It has complex contents and full marginalia.

== Description ==
The codex contains a complete text of the four Gospels with a commentary on 302 leaves (size 24 cm by 18.5 cm). The parchment is thin. The biblical text written in 21 lines per page, the text of commentary in 54 lines per page. It is written in very neat minuscule letters. The initial letters are in colour.

The text is divided according to the κεφαλαια (chapters), whose numbers are given at the margin, and the τιτλοι (titles of chapters) at the top of the pages. There is also a division according to the Ammonian Sections (in Mark 233 sections – the last in 16:8), and references to the Eusebian Canons (written below Ammonian Section numbers).

It contains the Epistula ad Carpianum, Eusebian Canon tables, Prolegomena, lists of the κεφαλαια (tables of contents) are placed before each of the Gospels. Lectionary markings (for liturgical use) and synaxaria added by a later hand.

== Text ==
The Greek text of the codex is a representative of the Byzantine text-type. Aland placed it in Category V. It was not examined by the Claremont Profile Method.

== History ==
The manuscript once belonged to Matthias Corvinus, the great King of Hungary (1458-1490) (as codex 78). It was collated in 1773 by Treschow, and by Alter. Alter used it in his edition of the Greek text of the New Testament. C. R. Gregory saw it in 1887.

It is currently housed at the Austrian National Library (Theol. gr. 154), at Vienna.

== See also ==
- List of New Testament minuscules
- Biblical manuscript
- Textual criticism
