= Hours of Maria d'Harcourt =

1415 illuminated prayer book

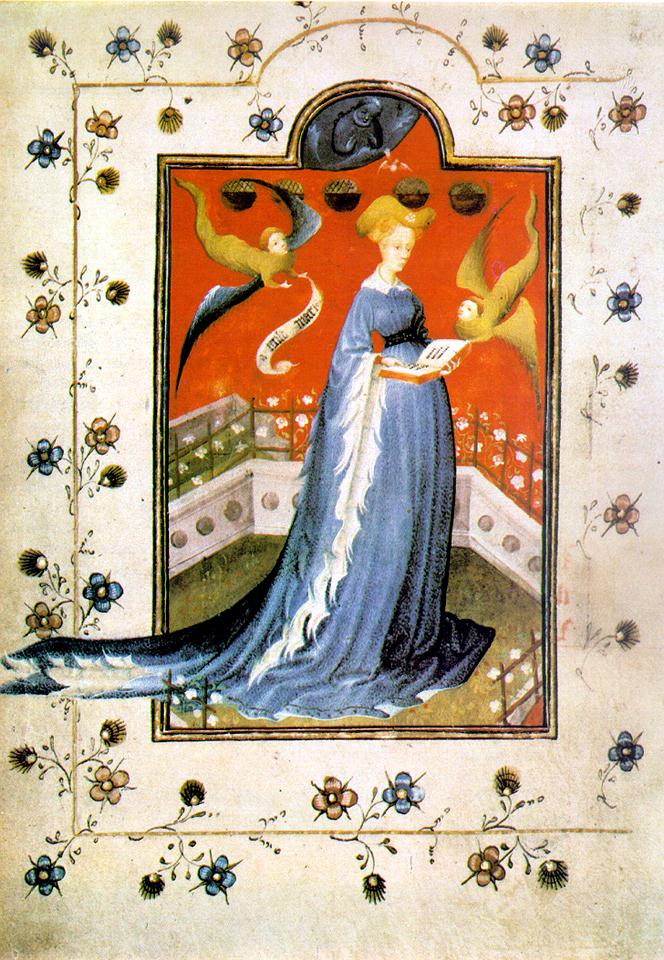
- The Duchess of Guelders, folio 19v.
- Year: 1415 to 1425
- Catalogue: Ms. Germ. qu.42 et Cod.1908
- Medium: illuminations on vellum, 2 volumes of 483 and 137 folios
- Movement: Early Netherlandish art
- Dimensions: 18.5 cm × 13.5 cm (7.3 in × 5.3 in)
- Location: Berlin State Library Austrian National Library

The Hours of Maria d'Harcourt is an illuminated book of hours produced in 1415 in Arnhem (the text) and Nijmegen (the illuminations) in the Duchy of Guelders. It follows the Roman liturgy, with 6 full-page miniatures and 86 smaller miniatures, with stylised borders. It is divided into two volumes, the larger of which is held in Berlin at the Staatsbibliothek, the smaller is held in Vienna by the Österreichische Nationalbibliothek.

== Description ==
The scribe finished the manuscript in 1415, which had been written over the course of decade at the monastery Marienborn. In the 17th century one part was owned by the Elector of Brandenburg. That is now in the Berlin State Library, Prussian Cultural Heritage Foundation under the signature ms. germ. quart. 42. The second part was held by the Habsburgs and is now in the Austrian National Library in Vienna under the signature Cod. 1908. The two parts were together in the 1962 exhibition "European art around 1400", in Vienna and described in the catalog (Nos. 207-208, pp 217–218).

== Maria d'Harcourt, Duchess of Guelders and Jülich ==
Maria d'Harcourt was the daughter of John VI, the Count of Harcourt and Aumale (1342–1389), and Catherine de Bourbon (1342–1427), Princess of France. Her maternal uncle was Louis II, Duke of Bourbon (1337–1410). On the 5 May 1405 she married Reinald IV, Duke of Guelders and Jülich. The proclamation page in her book of hours is French in appearance and is in such a striking contrast to the other miniatures of this German-Dutch handwriting that she must have intended its insertion. But this is not just a nostalgic remembrance of their home. Their political role and the making of heir to confirm the support of Orléans by Guelders were implied conditions of their marriage; also was a big part of her dowry, about 30,000 Ecus, been paid by the Duke of Orleans with the condition that they would have to be repaid in the absence of male heirs. Maria d'Harcourt died childless 1425th

Other women without sons asked for in their hours books Mary's help and the appropriate saint, z. B. Marguerite de Foix and Anne of Brittany. Maria von Geldern went one step further than they identified himself directly with the Blessed Mother.

== Artist ==
In the Vigil of the Feast of St. Matthew is stated that the manuscript whose text is written in Low German, for the Duchess on February 23, 1415 in Marienborn Convent (Arnhem) between Oosterbeek and Arnhem was completed by brother Helmich de Leev,

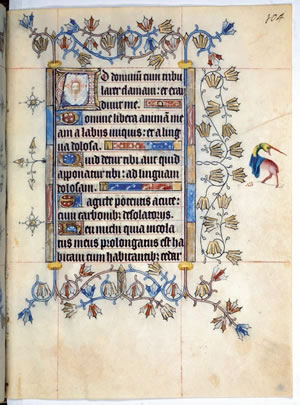
Hours of Maria d'Harcourt - decorated text page - ONB f104

== Sources ==
- Van der Laan, Joanka. "Mary of Guelders and her Book". Ons Geestelijk Erf, vol. 86, no. 3, pp. 178-214
