= Minuscule 219 =

- New Testament manuscript
- Name: Vind. Ness. 321
- Text: Gospels
- Date: 13th century
- Script: Greek
- Now at: Austrian National Library
- Size: 15 cm by 12 cm
- Type: Byzantine
- Category: V
- Note: Family E

Minuscule 219 (in the Gregory-Aland numbering), ε 385 (Soden), is a Greek minuscule manuscript of the New Testament, on parchment. Paleographically it has been assigned to the 13th century. It has marginalia.

== Description ==
The codex contains a complete text of the four Gospels, on 232 parchment leaves (size 15 cm by 12 cm). It is written in one column per page, 21 lines per page.

The text is divided according to the κεφαλαια (chapters), whose numbers are given at the margin, and the τιτλοι (titles of chapters) at the top of the pages. There is also a division according to the Ammonian Sections (in Mark 233, 16:8), with references to the Eusebian Canons (written below Ammonian Section numbers).

It contains the lists of the κεφαλαια (tables of contents) before each Gospel, and subscriptions at the end of each Gospel.

== Text ==
The Greek text of the codex is a representative of the Byzantine text-type. Aland placed it in Category V. Hermann von Soden classified it to the textual family E.

According to the Claremont Profile Method it represents the textual family K^{x} in Luke 1 and Luke 210. In Luke 10 no profile was made. It creates pair with 2217.

== History ==
The manuscript once belonged to J. Sambucky († 1584). Francis Karl Alter used it in his edition of the Greek text of the New Testament. C. R. Gregory saw it in 1887.

It is currently housed at the Austrian National Library (Theol. Gr. 321), at Vienna.

== See also ==
- List of New Testament minuscules
- Biblical manuscript
- Textual criticism
