= Minuscule 3 =

Greek minuscule manuscript of the New Testament

- New Testament manuscript
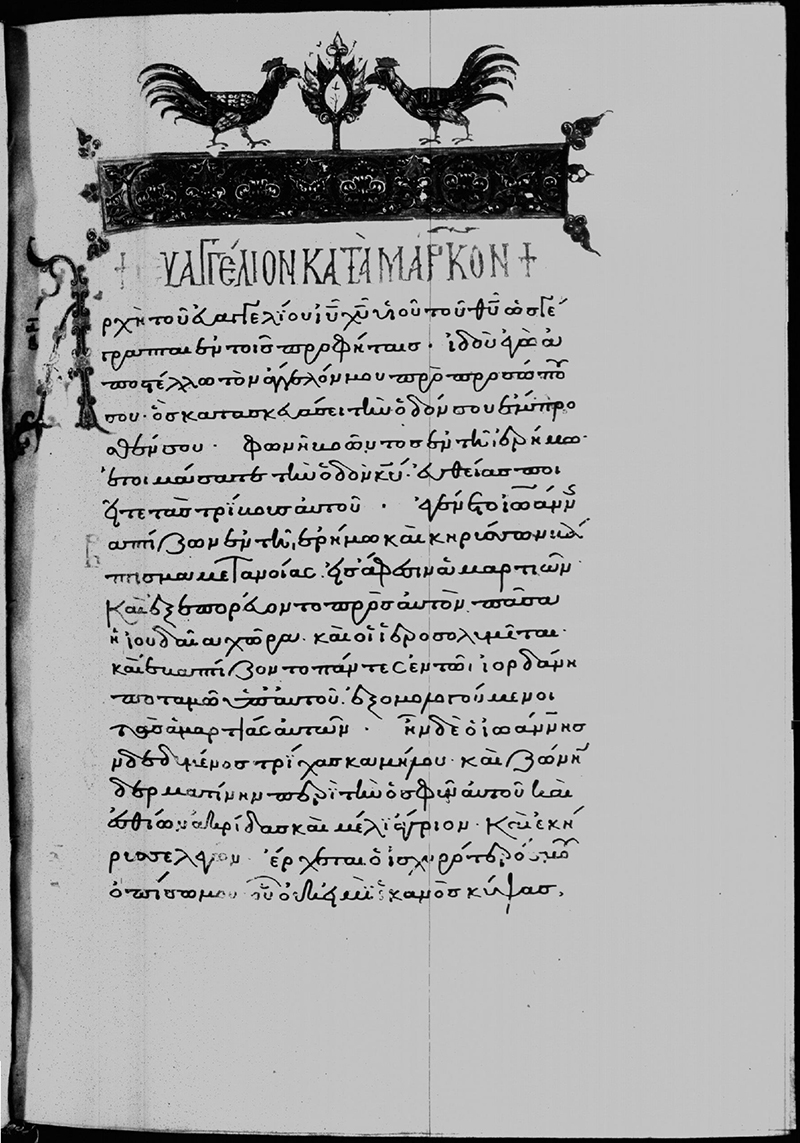
- Beginning of the Gospel of Mark in Minuscule 3
- Name: Codex Vindobonensis Suppl. Gr. 52, or Codex Corsendoncensis
- Text: New Testament (except Rev)
- Date: 12th century
- Script: Greek
- Now at: Austrian National Library
- Size: 24.5 cm by 17.5 cm
- Type: Byzantine text-type
- Category: V
- Note: marginalia

Minuscule 3, also known as Vindobonensis Suppl. Gr. 52, is a Greek minuscule manuscript of the New Testament, written on vellum. It is designated by the siglum 3 in the Gregory-Aland numbering of New Testament manuscripts, and δ 253 in the von Soden numbering of New Testament manuscripts. Using the study of comparative writing styles (palaeography), it has been dated to the 12th century. It was one of the manuscripts used by biblical scholar Desiderius Erasmus Roterodamus in his edition of the Greek text of the New Testament.

It was formerly (and is perhaps better) known as Codex Corsendoncensis, because it was previously kept (and possibly written) at the Augustinian monastery at Corsendonck, near Turnhout, Belgium, midway between Antwerp and Eindhoven.

== Description ==
The manuscript is a codex (precursor to the modern book format), containing the entirety of the New Testament except the Book of Revelation. The manuscript is made of 451 parchment leaves, sized 24.5 cm by 17.5 cm. The text is written in one column per page, 24 lines per page (16.3 cm by 10.2 cm), in black ink. It uses iota adscript (the addition of the smallest Greek letter at the end of certain words to indicate a diphthong which is now no longer pronounced).

The text is divided according to the chapters (known as κεφαλαια / kephalaia), whose numbers are given in the margin, with the titles of chapters (τιτλοι / titloi) at the top of the pages. The text of the Gospels has also another division according to the smaller Ammonian Sections (an early division of the Gospels into sections), with 234 sections in Mark, ending at 16:19. There are also references to the Eusebian Canons (another early division of the Gospels into sections) written underneath the Ammonian section numbers.

It contains the Letter to Carpian, Eusebian Canon tables, tables of contents (also known as κεφαλαια / kephalaia) before each book, Prolegomena, pictures (in John with Prochorus), and the Euthalian Apparatus to the Acts and General epistles (an early division of the rest of the books, similar to the Ammonian Sections). Subscriptions at the end of each book were added by a later hand.

Order of Books

- Gospels
- Acts of the Apostles
- General epistles
- Pauline epistles

== Text ==
The Greek text of the codex is considered a representative of the Byzantine text-type, with the exception of the Catholic epistles (James, 1 Peter, 2 Peter, 1 John, 2 John, 3 John, Jude). The text-types are groups of different New Testament manuscripts which share specific or generally related readings, which then differ from each other group, and thus the conflicting readings can separate out the groups. These are then used to determine the original text as published; there are three main groups with names: Alexandrian, Western, and Byzantine. Biblical scholar Hermann von Soden classified it to the textual family Family K^{x}. Biblical scholar Kurt Aland placed it in Category V of his New Testament manuscript text classification system. Category V is for "Manuscripts with a purely or predominantly Byzantine text."

According to the Claremont Profile Method (a specific analysis method of textual data), it represents K^{x} in Luke 1 and Luke 20. In Luke 10 no Profile was made.

The text of the Pericope Adulterae (John 7:53–8:11) is omitted without any mark.

== History ==
The historian Radulph de Rivo presented this manuscript to the monastery of the Virgin Mary in the village Corsendonck near Turnhout. Later it belonged to the monastery of Dominican Order in Basel.

It was used by Erasmus in his second edition of Novum Testamentum in 1519. It had been collated by J. Walker for biblical scholar Richard Bentley. This collation was never published. It was also collated by biblical scholar Johann Jakob Wettstein. Wettstein charges it with being altered from the Latin.

The manuscript was also examined by Herman Gerhard Treschow, biblical scholar Francis Karl Alter and biblical scholar John Wordsworth. The manuscript has not been cited in the Nestle-Aland editions of Novum Testamentum Graece. Alter used it in his edition of the Greek text of the New Testament.

The manuscript is currently dated by the INTF to the 12th century CE. It is presently located at the Austrian National Library (shelf number Cod. Suppl. Gr. 52) in Vienna.

== See also ==
- List of New Testament minuscules
- Textus Receptus
- Textual criticism
