= Lectionary 138 =

Lectionary ℓ 138
- New Testament manuscript
- Text: Evangelistarion
- Date: 15th century
- Script: Greek
- Now at: Biblioteca Nazionale Vittorio Emanuele III
- Size: 26.9 cm by 20.5 cm

Lectionary 138, designated by siglum ℓ 138 (in the Gregory-Aland numbering) is a Greek manuscript of the New Testament, on paper leaves. Palaeographically it has been assigned to the 15th century.

== Description ==
The codex contains lessons from the Gospels of John, Matthew, Luke lectionary (Evangelistarium), on 255 paper leaves (26.9 cm by 20.5 cm). The text is written in Greek minuscule letters, in two columns per page, 22 lines per page.

== History ==
The manuscript once belonged to Christopher Palaeologus, who presented it on May 7, 1584, to the church of SS. Petri et Pauli in Naples.

The manuscript was added to the list of New Testament manuscripts by Scholz. It was examined and described by Scholz and Gregory.

The manuscript is not cited in the critical editions of the Greek New Testament (UBS3).

Currently the codex is located in the Biblioteca Nazionale Vittorio Emanuele III (Ms. II. A. 6), in Naples.

== See also ==
- List of New Testament lectionaries
- Biblical manuscript
- Textual criticism
- Lectionary 46

== Bibliography ==
- J. M. A. Scholz, Biblisch-kritische Reise in Frankreich, der Schweiz, Italien, Palästine und im Archipel in den Jahren 1818, 1819, 1820, 1821: Nebst einer Geschichte des Textes des Neuen Testaments.
