= Lectionary 45 =

Lectionary ℓ 45
- New Testament manuscript
- Name: Caesar-Vindob.
- Text: Evangelistarion
- Date: 10th-century
- Script: Greek
- Now at: Austrian National Library
- Size: 30 cm by 21 cm

Lectionary 45, designated by siglum ℓ 45 (in the Gregory-Aland numbering). It is a Greek manuscript of the New Testament, on parchment leaves. Palaeographically it has been assigned to the 10th-century.

== Description ==
The codex contains lessons from the Gospels of John, Matthew, Luke lectionary (Evangelistarium), with lacunae at the beginning. The text is written in two columns per page, 21 lines per page, in Greek uncial letters. Only 6 parchment leaves (30 cm by 21 cm) from the binding of a law-book have survived. It contains Nomokanon of Photius and Apostolic Canons.

== History ==
Busbecq brought the manuscript from Constantinople to Vienna. It was examined by Alter. Alter used it in his edition of the Greek text of the New Testament.

The manuscript is not cited in the critical editions of the Greek New Testament (UBS3).

Currently the codex is located in the Austrian National Library (Jur. gr. 5, fol. 575-580) in Vienna.

== See also ==
- List of New Testament lectionaries
- Biblical manuscript
- Textual criticism
