= Francis Karl Alter =

American professor and Jesuit

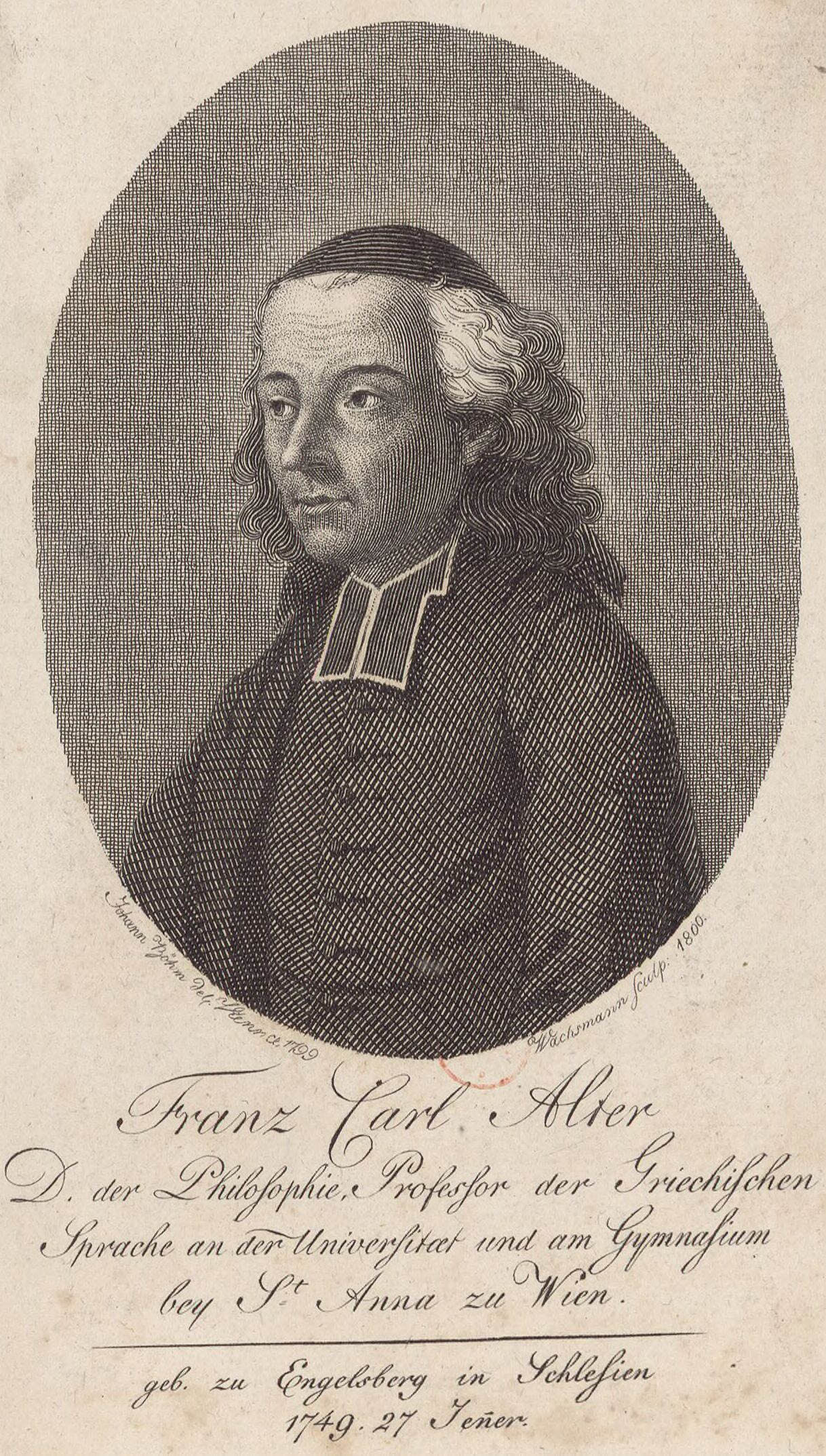
Francis Karl Alter

Francis Karl Alter SJ (German: Franz Karl Alter) (1749–1804), a Jesuit, born in Silesia, and professor of Greek at Vienna, was an editor of the Greek text of the New Testament. His edition was different from those of Mill, Wettstein, and Griesbach, because he used only the manuscripts housed at the Imperial Library at Vienna. It was the first edition of the Greek New Testament that contained evidence from Slavic manuscripts themselves, as opposed to Christian Frederick Matthaei's editions (1803-7), also claimed (by Bruce Metzger) to be the first to contain evidence from the Slavic version of the New Testament.

Alter used twelve manuscripts of the Gospels (U, 3, 76, 77, 108, 123, 124, 125, 219, 220, 224, 225), six of the Acts (3, 43^{a}, 63^{a}, 64^{a}, 66^{a}, 67^{a}), seven of the Pauline epistles (3, 49^{p}, 67^{p}, 68^{p}, 69^{p}, 70^{p}, 71^{p}), three of the Apocalypse (34^{r}, 35^{r}, 36^{r}), and two Evangelistaria (ℓ 45, ℓ 46). He also used readings from the Coptic Bohairic version (edited by David Wilkins in 1716), four Slavonic codices and one Old Latin codex (i). Most of these Vienna codices were also examined by Andrew Birch.

Marsh gave this opinion:

"The text of this edition is neither the common text nor a revision of it, but a mere copy from a single manuscript, and that not a very ancient one".

It was not the Textus Receptus, and it was not an important edition for textual criticism, but Alter's comparison of Slavic and Greek texts did provide material for future textual criticism.

Alter also edited Homer's Iliad (1789) and Odyssey (1794) and wrote an essay on Georgian literature (1798).

== Selected works ==
- Alter, Francis K. (1786–1787). Novum Testamentum Graecum, ad Codicem Vindobonensem Graece expressum: Varietatem Lectionis addidit Franciscus Carolus Alter (2 vols). Wien (Vienna): De Trattnern. OCLC 1015492164.
- ——— (1786). Marci Tullii Ciceronis Quaestiones Academicae, Tusculanae, De Finibus Bonorum Et Malorum Et De Fato. Wien (Vienna): De Trattnern. OCLC 630194983.
- ——— (1798). Ueber Georgianische Litteratur. Wien (Vienna): De Trattnern. OCLC 159904335.
- ——— (1799). Philologisch-kritische Miscellaneen. Wien (Vienna): De Trattnern. OCLC 444709116.
- ——— (1801). Beitrag zur praktischen Diplomatik für Slaven. Wien (Vienna): C. Schaumburg. OCLC 236100412.
