= Minuscule 76 =

- New Testament manuscript
- Name: Codex Caesar-Vindobonensis
- Text: New Testament (except Rev.)
- Date: 14th century
- Script: Greek
- Now at: Austrian National Library
- Size: 19 cm by 13.5 cm
- Type: Byzantine text-type
- Category: V
- Note: close to Complutensian Polyglot full marginalia

Minuscule 76 (in the Gregory-Aland numbering), δ 298 (von Soden), known as Codex Caesar-Vindobonensis, is a Greek minuscule manuscript of the New Testament, on parchment leaves. Palaeographically it has been assigned to the 14th century. Formerly it was assigned by 49^{p}. It has complex contents, and full marginalia. It was adapted for liturgical use

== Description ==
The codex contains entire of the New Testament except its last book, the Book of Revelation, on 358 leaves (size 19 cm by 13.5 cm). The text is written in one column per page, 27 lines per page. The initial letters in red, main text in black ink. The margins are wide, size of the text is 13 cm by 8.5 cm.

The text is divided according to the κεφαλαια (chapters), whose numbers are given at the margin, and their τιτλοι (titles of chapters) at the top of the pages. There is also another division according to the Ammonian Sections (in Mark 234 sections – 16:9), without references to the Eusebian Canons.

It contains prolegomena, tables of the κεφαλαια (tables of contents) before each book, lectionary markings at the margin (for liturgical use), incipits, liturgical books with hagiographies (synaxaria and Menologion), and pictures (John the Evangelist with Prochorus).

The order of books is usual for the Greek manuscripts: Gospels, Acts, Catholic epistles, and Pauline epistles.

== Text ==
The Greek text of the codex is a representative of the Byzantine text-type. Hermann von Soden classified it to the textual family K^{x}. Aland placed it in Category V. According to the Claremont Profile Method it represents K^{x} in Luke 10. In Luke 1 and Luke 20 it has mixed Byzantine text.

The manuscript is sometimes erroneously cited as the only known Greek copy to read in Luke 2:22 αὐτῆς with the Complutensian Polyglot. However, according to Caspar Rene Gregory who personally viewed the manuscript it actually reads αὐτῶν and not αὐτῆς. No Greek manuscripts of the NT read αὐτῆς in Luke 2:22, they either read αὐτῶν, αὑτον or αὐτου. The form αὐτῆς in the Complutensian Polyglot and the critical editions of Beza and Elzevir is wholly derived from the Latin eius (which could be either masculine or feminine). Its inclusion in the King James Bible is simply another example where a reading not found in any Greek manuscript was adopted via the Latin Vulgate's influence on Beza's critical editions.

== History ==
Possibly it was used by editors of the Complutensian Polyglot. In 1690 Gerhard von Mastricht examined it for John Mill. In 1711 Mill used it in his edition of Novum Testamentum, and "erroneously" called it an uncial. It was used by Alter in his edition of the Greek New Testament in 1786. C. R. Gregory saw it in 1887.

It is currently housed at the Austrian National Library (Theol. gr. 300), at Vienna.

== See also ==
- List of New Testament minuscules
- Biblical manuscript
- Textual criticism
