= Minuscule 221 =

- New Testament manuscript
- Text: Acts, Paul
- Date: 10th century
- Script: Greek
- Now at: Bodleian Library
- Size: 18.9 cm by 13.4 cm
- Type: Byzantine
- Category: V
- Note: beautiful copy

Minuscule 221 (in the Gregory-Aland numbering), α69 (Soden), is a Greek minuscule manuscript of the New Testament, on parchment. Paleographically it has been assigned to the 10th century. Scrivener labelled it by 212^{a} and 250^{p}. It has marginalia.

== Description ==
The codex contains a complete text of the Acts of the Apostles, Catholic epistles, and Pauline epistles on 382 parchment leaves (size 18.9 cm by 13.4 cm). The text is written in one column per page, 18-19 lines per page.

The text is divided according to the κεφαλαια (chapters), whose numbers are given at the margin, with their τιτλοι (titles of chapters) at the top of the pages.

It contains prolegomena, lists of the κεφαλαια (tables of the contents) before each biblical book, pictures, subscriptions at the end of each book, and numbers of στιχοι to Paul. It also contains one leaf from Cyril's Homilies, and two others later.

According to Scrivener it is a beautiful copy.

== Text ==
The Greek text of the codex is a representative of the Byzantine text-type. Aland placed it in Category V.

It contains the Comma Johanneum, but it was added by a later hand.

== History ==
The manuscript was brought by Busbeck from Constantinople (along with Minuscule 222).

The manuscript was examined by Coxe, Scrivener, and C. R. Gregory (1887).

It is currently housed at the Bodleian Library (Canon. Gr. 110), at Oxford.

== See also ==
- List of New Testament minuscules
- Biblical manuscript
- Textual criticism
