= Lists of New Testament minuscules =

Greek New Testament manuscripts

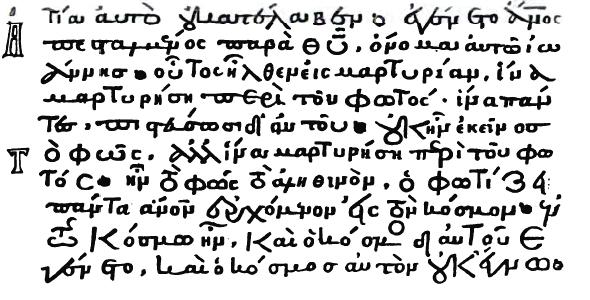
John 1:5b-10 in Codex Ebnerianus (Minuscule 105) from 12th century.

The list of New Testament Minuscules ordered by Gregory–Aland index number is divided into three sections:

- List of New Testament minuscules (1–1000)
- List of New Testament minuscules (1001–2000)
- List of New Testament minuscules (2001–3018)

== By location and institution ==
List of New Testament Minuscules ordered by location and hosting institution:

(*) Indicates only a portion of manuscript held by institution.
(**) Indicates manuscript is a forgery.
Bold Indicates manuscript has been color photographed.

=== A–F ===
Country	City	Institution	Count	List of Minuscule Manuscripts in Collection
Albania	Tirana	National Archives of Albania	22	1141, 1143, 1705, 1706, 1707, 1709, 1764, 2244, 2245, 2246, 2247, 2252, 2253, 2514, 2813, 2900, 2901, 2902, 2903, 2908, 2912, 2913
Armenia	Yerevan	Matenadaran	3	2551, 2552, 2553
Australia	Melbourne	National Gallery of Victoria	1	662
Austria	Vienna	Austrian National Library	33	3, 76, 77, 123, 124, 125, 218, 219, 220, 222, 404, 421, 424, 425, 434, 719, 720, 721, 722, 723, 724, 1523, 1524, 1953, 1962, 2018, 2044, 2045, 2046, 2292, 2622, 2795, 2838
Belgium	Brussels	Royal Library of Belgium	5	725, 726, 2599, 2746, 2840
Brazil	Rio de Janeiro	National Library	1	2437
Bulgaria	Sofia	Center for Slavic & Byzantine Studies	25	1425, 1426, 1427, 1428, 1431, 1684, 1760, 1766, 1779, 1781, 1783, 1784, 1786, 1787, 1788, 1789, 1790, 1791, 1792, 1794, 1795*, 2214, 2249, 2250, 2257
Bulgaria	Sofia	St. Cyril and Methodius National Library	2	2747, 2748
Bulgaria	Sofia	Institute of Church History	7	2462, 2463, 2772, 2773, 2774, 2775, 2856
Canada	Montreal	Diocesan Theological College	2	2398*, 2415*
Canada	Montreal	McGill University	2	2401*, 2415*
Canada	Toronto	Borowski Collection	1	1395
Canada	Toronto	University of Toronto	1	2321
Cyprus	Kykkos	Museum of the Holy Monastery of Kykkos	1	2787
Cyprus	Kaimakli	S. M. Logidou (Private Collection)	1	2790
Cyprus	Kyrenia	Metropolis Library	2	2788, 2789
Cyprus	Larnaca	Metropolis Library	2	2215, 2745*
Cyprus	Nicosia	Library of the Archbishop of Cyprus	1	2469
Cyprus	Nicosia	Kentron Epistim. Erevnon	1	2792*
Cyprus	Nicosia	Private Collection	1	2906
Cyprus	Paphos	Metropolis Library	1	2792*
Cyprus	Paphos	Saint Neophytos Monastery	2	2791, 2880
Czech Republic	Prague	Charles University	1	1422
Czech Republic	Prague	Academy of Sciences	1	1689
Czech Republic	Krivoklat	Castle Library	1	2885
Denmark	Copenhagen	Royal Danish Library	3	234, 235, 2009
Egypt	Alexandria	Greek Orthodox Patriarchate	10	81*, 903*, 904, 1302, 1867, 2205, 2206, 2207, 2208, 2937
Egypt	Sinai	Saint Catherine's Monastery	98	1185, 1186, 1187, 1188, 1189, 1190, 1191, 1192, 1193, 1194, 1195, 1196, 1197, 1198, 1199, 1200, 1201, 1202, 1203, 1204, 1205*, 1206*, 1207, 1208, 1209*, 1210, 1211*, 1212, 1213, 1214, 1215, 1216, 1217, 1218, 1219, 1220*, 1221, 1222, 1223, 1224, 1225, 1226, 1227, 1228, 1229, 1230, 1231*, 1232, 1233, 1234, 1235, 1236, 1237, 1238*, 1239, 1240, 1241, 1242, 1243, 1244, 1245, 1247, 1248, 1249, 1250, 1251, 1252, 1253, 1254, 1255, 1256, 1874, 1876, 1877, 1878, 1879, 1880, 1881, 2085, 2086, 2355, 2356, 2492, 2493, 2494, 2495, 2496, 2497, 2498, 2499, 2501, 2502, 2503, 2797, 2798, 2799, 2800, 2801
France	Paris	National Library	228	4, 5, 6, 7, 8, 9, 10, 11, 12, 13, 14, 15, 16, 17, 18, 19, 20, 21, 22, 23, 24, 25, 26, 27, 28, 29, 30, 31, 32, 33, 34, 35, 36, 37, 38, 39, 40, 41, 62, 80, 82, 91, 93, 94, 119, 120, 250, 256, 260, 261, 262, 263, 264, 265, 266, 267, 268, 269, 270, 271, 273, 274, 275, 276, 277, 278, 279, 280, 281, 282, 283, 284, 285, 286, 287, 288*, 289, 290, 291, 292, 293, 294, 295, 296, 297, 298, 299, 300, 301, 302, 303, 304, 305, 306, 307, 310, 311, 313, 315, 316, 317, 318, 320, 324, 329, 331, 465, 466, 467, 468, 469, 567, 579, 580, 601, 602, 603, 604, 605, 606, 607, 608, 609*, 610, 727, 728, 729, 730, 731, 732, 733, 734, 735, 736, 737, 738, 739, 740, 741, 742, 743, 744, 745, 746, 747, 748, 749, 750, 751, 752, 753, 754, 755, 756, 1261, 1262, 1263, 1264, 1265, 1266, 1267, 1291, 1292, 1293, 1294, 1295, 1296, 1297, 1298, 1299, 1300, 1301, 1359, 1360*, 1526, 1848*, 1885*, 1886, 1905, 1906, 1910, 1931, 1932, 1933, 1934, 1935, 1936, 1937, 1938, 1939, 1964, 1965, 1969, 1970, 1971, 1972, 2011, 2025, 2026, 2027, 2028, 2029, 2047, 2048, 2110, 2111, 2112, 2242, 2298, 2328, 2344, 2387, 2390, 2391, 2392, 2419, 2428, 2429, 2430, 2819, 2820, 2846, 2847, 2848, 2867, 2898, 2917, 2931
France	Paris	Library of the Arsenal	1	43
France	Paris	Sainte-Geneviève Library	2	121, 1882
France	Paris	Institut de France	1	288*
France	Paris	National School of Fine Arts	1	1498*
France	Montpellier	Interuniversity Library	1	577
France	Arras	Public Library	1	578
France	Besancon	Library of Study and Conservation	1	1963
France	Riom	Riom Library	1	1303
France	Strasbourg	Priesterseminarium	1	431
France	Strasbourg	National and University Library	2	663, 2598

[top]

=== G ===
Country	City	Institution	Count	List of Minuscule Manuscripts in Collection
Germany	Augsburg	University Library	1	2814
Germany	Berlin	Berlin State Library	13	172, 400, 655, 656, 657, 660, 1311, 1370, 1371, 1374, 2490, 2491*, 2941
Germany	Berlin	Humboldt University of Berlin	1	2308
Germany	Bernkastel-Kues	Cusanusstift	1	87
Germany	Cologne	Archaeological Institute of the University of Cologne	1	2745*
Germany	Dessau	Anhaltinian Regional Library	1	651
Germany	Dresden	Saxon State Library	3	101, 2017, 2082
Germany	Frankfurt	City Archives	1	42
Germany	Goslar	C. W. Adam	1	2744
Germany	Gotha	Gotha Research Library	1	1884
Germany	Göttingen	Göttingen University Library	2	89, 1285
Germany	Hamburg	University of Hamburg	1	336
Germany	Leipzig	University of Leipzig	4	99, 564, 1284, 1913
Germany	Munich	Bavarian State Library	20	83, 84, 85, 177, 422, 423, 426, 427, 428, 430, 652, 1909, 1929, 1930, 2037, 2038, 2768, 2888, 2889, 2891
Germany	Münster	Institute for New Testament Textual Research	11	676, 798*, 1432, 2444, 2445, 2446, 2460*, 2754, 2755, 2756, 2793
Germany	Oldenburg	State Library	1	2796
Germany	Weimar	Duchess Anna Amalia Library	1	2939
Germany	Wolfenbüttel	Herzog August Library	5	97, 126, 429, 2360, 2921
Germany	Zittau	Christian Weise Library	1	664
Greece	Almyros	Archaeological Museum of Almyros	2	2459, 2675
Greece	Amorgos	Panagia Hozoviotissa Monastery	6	1304, 1306, 1307, 1308, 1887, 2647
Greece	Andros	St. Nicholas Monastery	1	1382
Greece	Andros	Panachrantos Monastery	3	1383, 1384, 2630
Greece	Andros	Zoodochos Pigi Monastery (Hagias)	4	1362, 1363, 2113, 2648
Greece	Athens	Academy of Athens	1	2442
Greece	Athens	Athens University History Museum	5	2120, 2121, 2122, 2123, 2124, 2657
Greece	Athens	Benaki Museum	15	1305, 2323, 2557, 2558, 2559, 2561, 2562, 2563, 2658, 2659, 2660, 2661, 2835, 2904, 2905
Greece	Athens	Byzantine and Christian Museum	18	1685, 1687, 1688, 1812, 2117, 2118, 2299, 2300, 2301, 2376, 2377, 2378, 2440, 2520, 2521, 2522, 2649, 2650
Greece	Athens	Gennadius Library	6	1797, 1807, 1873, 2651, 2916, 2925
Greece	Athens	Hellenic Parliament Library	8	804, 805, 806, 807, 2049, 2096, 2097, 2313
Greece	Athens	State Archives	1	2567
Greece	Athens	Holy Synod of the Church of Greece	1	2776
Greece	Athens	P. Kanellopoulos	1	927*
Greece	Athens	S. Loberdos	7	2631, 2632, 2633, 2634, 2635, 2636, 2637
Greece	Athens	National Historical Museum	4	2119, 2449, 2450, 2451
Greece	Athens	National Library of Greece	124	254, 646, 648, 757, 758, 759, 760, 761, 762, 763, 764, 765, 766, 768, 769, 770, 771, 772, 773, 774, 775, 776, 777, 778, 779, 780, 781, 782, 783, 784, 785, 786, 787, 788, 789, 790, 791, 792, 793, 794, 795, 796, 797, 798*, 799, 800, 801, 802, 803, 808, 809, 811, 1016*, 1154, 1155, 1182, 1183, 1271, 1272, 1360*, 1367, 1372, 1405, 1410, 1411, 1412, 1413, 1414, 1415, 1416, 1417, 1418, 1419, 1610, 1611, 1686, 1690, 1691, 1692, 1694, 1695, 1697, 1698, 1699, 1700, 1761, 1762, 1763, 1827, 1828, 1829, 1830, 1831, 1832, 1875, 1973, 2013, 2084, 2089, 2091, 2114, 2239, 2240, 2243, 2473, 2508, 2509, 2510, 2523, 2524, 2525, 2526, 2527, 2528, 2652, 2653, 2654, 2655, 2656, 2933, 2934, 2935, 2936, 2940
Greece	Athens	Ch. G. Sarros	3	2517, 2518, 2519
Greece	Agia Thekli, Cephalonia	Tsimaratos	1	2209
Greece	Lixouri, Cephalonia	Jakovatos	2	2213, 2678
Greece	Lixouri, Cephalonia	Kipoureon Monastery	1	2211
Greece	Chios	A. de Meibohm (Private Collection)	1	2513
Greece	Corfu	Monastery of Paleokastritsa	1	2571
Greece	Dimitsana	Village Library	3	2515, 2516, 2673
Greece	Drama	Kosinitza Monastery	1	1424
Greece	Elassona	Monastery of Olympiotissa	7	2199*, 2200, 2201, 2202, 2203, 2204, 2674
Greece	Epirus	Giromeri Monastery	1	2645*
Greece	Grevena	Zavorda Monastery of St. Nikanor	13	2724, 2725, 2726, 2727, 2728, 2729, 2730, 2731, 2732, 2733, 2734, 2735, 2736
Greece	Heraklion, Crete	Historical Museum of Crete	2	898*, 2779
Greece	Hydra	Panagia Zourva Monastery	1	2395
Greece	Ioannina	Archaeological Museum	1	2676
Greece	Ioannina	Katerini	1	2677
Greece	Ioannina	Zosimaia School	1	2460*
Greece	Karditsa	Koronis Monastery	2	2777, 2778
Greece	Kalavryta	Agion Theodoron Monastery	1	2287
Greece	Kalavryta	Monastery of Agia Lavra	2	2260, 2261
Greece	Kalavryta	Mega Spileo Monastery	3	2224, 2229, 2263
Greece	Kalymnos	Kalymnos Municipal Library	2	2802, 2803
Greece	Agiasos, Lesbos	Church of Panayia	2	2679, 2680
Greece	Antissa, Lesbos	Monastery of St. John the Theologian	2	2237, 2238
Greece	Kalloni, Lesbos	Leimonos Monastery	16	1156, 1157, 1158, 1159, 1712, 1713, 1714, 1715, 1757, 1758, 1841, 2217, 2218, 2220, 2681, 2682
Greece	Mytilene, Lesbos	Ecclesiastical Byzantine Museum of Mytilene	1	1377
Greece	Mytilene, Lesbos	High School	2	1379, 1716
Greece	Lesbos	Zoodochu Pigis	1	2236
Greece	Meteora	Great Meteoron Monastery	26	2329, 2351, 2352, 2689, 2690, 2691, 2692, 2693, 2694, 2695, 2696, 2697, 2698, 2699, 2700, 2701, 2702, 2703, 2704, 2705, 2706, 2707, 2708, 2709, 2710, 2711
Greece	Meteora	Monastery of St. Stephen	6	2712, 2713, 2714, 2715, 2716, 2717
Greece	Meteora	Monastery of Varlaam	6	2683, 2684, 2685, 2686, 2687*, 2688
Greece	Mount Athos	Skete of Saint Anne	2	2070, 2452
Greece	Mount Athos	Agiou Pavlou Monastery	3	1095, 1096, 1862
Greece	Mount Athos	Skete of Saint Demetre	1	2803
Greece	Mount Athos	Dionysiou Monastery	48	924, 925*, 926, 928*, 929, 930, 931, 932, 933, 934, 935, 936, 937, 938*, 939, 940, 941, 942*, 943, 944, 945, 946, 947, 948, 949, 950, 951*, 952, 953, 954, 955, 956, 957, 958, 959, 960, 961, 962, 963, 1099, 1100, 1101, 2071, 2456, 2457, 2458, 2663, 2664
Greece	Mount Athos	Docheiariou Monastery	27	964, 965, 966, 967, 968, 969, 970, 971, 972, 973, 974, 975, 976, 977, 978, 979, 1102, 1103, 1104, 1105, 1106, 1407, 1408, 2072, 2368*, 2665, 2666
Greece	Mount Athos	Esphigmenou Monastery	16	980, 981, 982, 983, 985, 986, 1107, 1108, 1115, 1140, 1406, 1853, 1902, 2092, 2285, 2922
Greece	Mount Athos	Great Lavra Monastery	173	1071, 1072, 1073, 1074, 1075, 1076, 1077, 1078, 1079, 1080, 1439, 1440, 1441, 1442, 1443, 1444, 1445, 1446, 1447, 1448, 1449, 1450, 1451, 1452, 1453, 1454, 1455, 1456, 1457, 1458, 1459, 1460, 1461, 1462, 1463, 1464, 1465, 1466, 1467, 1468, 1469, 1470, 1471, 1472, 1473, 1474*, 1475, 1476, 1477, 1478, 1479, 1480, 1481, 1482, 1483, 1484, 1485, 1486, 1487, 1488, 1489, 1490, 1491, 1492, 1493, 1494, 1495, 1496, 1497, 1498*, 1499, 1500, 1501, 1502, 1503, 1504, 1505, 1506, 1507, 1508, 1509, 1510, 1511, 1512, 1513, 1514, 1515, 1516, 1517, 1519, 1520, 1609, 1612, 1613, 1614, 1615, 1616, 1617, 1618, 1619, 1620, 1621, 1622, 1623, 1624, 1625, 1626, 1627, 1628, 1629, 1630, 1631, 1632, 1633, 1634, 1635, 1636, 1637, 1638, 1639, 1640, 1641, 1642, 1643, 1644, 1645, 1646, 1647, 1648, 1649, 1650, 1651, 1652, 1653, 1654, 1655, 1656, 1657, 1658, 1659, 1660, 1661, 1732, 1733, 1734, 1735, 1736, 1737, 1738, 1739, 1740, 1741, 1742, 1743, 1744, 1745, 1746, 1747, 1748, 1749, 1750, 1751, 1770, 1771, 1772, 1774, 2194, 2196, 2511, 2638, 2668, 2669, 2670
Greece	Mount Athos	Hilandar Monastery	2	1138, 1138
Greece	Mount Athos	Iviron Monastery	70	989, 990, 991, 992, 993, 994, 995, 996, 997, 998, 999, 1000, 1001, 1002, 1003, 1004, 1005, 1006, 1007, 1008, 1009, 1010, 1011, 1012, 1013, 1014, 1015, 1016*, 1017, 1018, 1019, 1020, 1021, 1023, 1024, 1025, 1026, 1027, 1028, 1029, 1030, 1031, 1608, 1767, 1768, 1769, 1854, 1855, 1856, 1857, 2073, 2074, 2075, 2076, 2077, 2193, 2254, 2255, 2256, 2258, 2923, 2930, 2947, 2948, 2949, 2950, 2951, 2967, 2968, 2969
Greece	Mount Athos	Karakallou Monastery	11	1032, 1033, 1034, 1035, 1036, 1037, 1038, 1039, 1040, 1041, 1042
Greece	Mount Athos	Skete of Kavsokalyvia	3	2424, 2431, 2512
Greece	Mount Athos	Konstamonitou Monastery	8	1043, 1044, 1045, 1098, 1702, 1858*, 2078, 2079
Greece	Mount Athos	Koutloumousiou Monastery	31	1046, 1047, 1048, 1050, 1052, 1053, 1054, 1055, 1056*, 1057, 1058, 1059, 1060, 1061, 1062, 1063, 1064, 1065, 1066, 1067, 1068, 1069, 1070, 1703, 1704, 1859, 1860, 1861, 1904, 2000, 2667
Greece	Mount Athos	Osiou Gregoriou Monastery	3	922, 923, 2802
Greece	Mount Athos	Pantokratoros Monastery	14	1391, 1392, 1393, 1394, 1396, 1397*, 1398, 1399, 1400, 1401, 1402, 1403, 1404, 1900
Greece	Mount Athos	Philotheou Monastery	23	1117, 1118, 1119, 1120, 1121, 1122, 1123, 1124, 1125, 1126, 1127, 1128, 1129, 1130, 1131, 1132, 1133, 1134, 1135, 1136, 1137, 1865, 2192
Greece	Mount Athos	Church of Protaton	2	1097, 1863
Greece	Mount Athos	Stavronikita Monastery	10	1110, 1111, 1112, 1113, 1114, 1116, 1390, 1864, 2259, 2286
Greece	Mount Athos	St. Panteleimon Monastery	42	1091, 1092, 1093, 1094, 1662, 1663, 1664, 1665, 1666, 1667, 1668, 1669, 1670, 1671, 1672*, 1673, 1674, 1675, 1676, 1677, 1678, 1679, 1680, 1752, 1753, 1754, 1755, 1756, 1775, 1776, 1777, 2671, 2672, 2825, 2826, 2827, 2829, 2830, 2851, 2887, 2909, 2910
Greece	Mount Athos	Vatopedi Monastery	135	1434, 1435, 1436, 1437, 1438, 1532, 1533, 1534, 1535, 1536, 1537, 1538, 1539, 1540, 1541, 1542, 1543, 1544, 1545, 1546, 1547, 1548, 1549, 1550, 1551, 1552, 1553, 1554, 1555, 1556, 1557, 1558, 1559, 1560, 1561, 1562, 1563, 1564, 1565, 1566, 1567, 1568, 1569, 1570, 1571, 1572, 1573, 1574, 1575, 1576, 1577, 1578, 1579, 1580, 1581, 1582, 1583, 1584, 1585, 1586, 1587, 1588, 1589, 1590, 1591, 1592, 1593, 1594, 1595, 1596, 1597, 1598, 1599, 1600, 1601, 1602, 1603, 1604, 1605, 1606, 1607, 1717, 1718, 1719, 1720, 1721, 1722, 1723, 1724, 1725, 1726, 1727, 1728, 1729, 1730, 1731, 1773, 2183, 2184, 2185, 2186, 2187, 2188, 2189, 2190, 2191*, 2197, 2289, 2305, 2306, 2307, 2309, 2310, 2436, 2453, 2454, 2455, 2568, 2569, 2570, 2662, 2831, 2832, 2833, 2834, 2869, 2870, 2871, 2872, 2873, 2874, 2875, 2876, 2877, 2927
Greece	Mount Athos	Xenophontos Monastery	2	1681, 2828
Greece	Mount Athos	Xeropotamou Monastery	12	1081, 1082, 1083, 1084, 1085, 1086, 1087, 1088, 1089, 1090, 1409, 1903
Greece	Mount Athos	Zograf Monastery	2	987, 988
Greece	Paros	Monastery of Longovardas	1	2849
Greece	Patmos	E. Anemis (Private Collection)	1	2639
Greece	Patmos	Monastery of Saint John the Theologian	41	1160, 1161, 1162, 1163, 1164, 1165, 1166, 1167, 1168, 1169, 1170, 1171, 1172, 1173, 1174, 1175, 1176, 1177, 1178, 1179, 1180, 1181, 1385, 1386, 1387, 1388, 1389, 1899, 1901, 1966, 2001, 2002, 2080, 2081, 2297, 2464, 2465, 2466, 2467, 2468, 2758
Greece	Patras	Chrysopodaritissis Monastery	1	2804
Greece	Pelion	Agios Lavrentios Church	1	2223
Greece	Pyrgos	Metropolis Library	1	2781
Greece	Lindos, Rhodes	Church of Panagia	2	2718, 2719
Greece	Lindos, Rhodes	I. Tsinganos (Private Collection)	1	2720
Greece	Plagia, Aktio-Vonitsa	Panagia Church	1	2780
Greece	Samos	Library of the Metropolis of Samos	4	2782, 2783, 2784, 2785
Greece	Santorini	Prophet Elijah Monastery	1	2786
Greece	Sapoto	High School	1	2721
Greece	Serres	Timiou Prodromou Monastery	1	1696*
Greece	Sparta	Museum of Ecclesiastical Art	2	2221, 2265
Greece	Thessaloniki	S. Asteriades (Private collection)	1	2251
Greece	Thessaloniki	Vlatades Monastery	4	1682, 1683, 1759, 1778
Greece	Trikala	Saint Vissarionos (Dusan) Monastery	2	2723, 2806
Greece	Tripotama	Tatarnis Monastery	1	2810
Greece	Tyrnavos	Municipal Library	2	2722, 2915
Greece	Zagora	Public Historical Library of Zagora	5	2414, 2418, 2422, 2433, 2434

[top]

=== H–M ===
Country	City	Institution	Count	List of Minuscule Manuscripts in Collection
Hungary	Budapest	National Széchényi Library	1	78
Hungary	Budapest	Eötvös Loránd University	1	100
Hungary	Budapest	Library and Information Centre of the Hungarian Academy of Sciences	3	2762, 2763, 2764
Ireland	Dublin	Chester Beatty Library	5	106, 2603, 2604, 2605, 2606
Ireland	Dublin	Trinity College	3	61, 63, 2010
Israel	Jerusalem	Patriarchate of Jerusalem	65	1312, 1313, 1314, 1315, 1316, 1317, 1318, 1319, 1320, 1321, 1322, 1323, 1324, 1325, 1326, 1327, 1328, 1329*, 1330, 1331, 1332, 1333, 1334*, 1335, 1336*, 1337, 1338*, 1339, 1340, 1341, 1342, 1343, 1344, 1345, 1346*, 1347, 1348*, 1349, 1350, 1351, 1352, 1353, 1354, 1355, 1364, 1365, 1888, 1889, 1890, 1891, 1892, 1893, 1894, 1895, 1896, 1897, 2012, 2248, 2302, 2303, 2345, 2357, 2824, 2843, 2926
Israel	Jerusalem	Church of the Holy Sepulchre	2	1358, 2475
Italy	Bologna	University of Bologna	2	204, 1975
Italy	Bologna	Municipal Library	1	2482
Italy	Brescia	Queriniana Library	1	1816
Italy	Cortona	Library of the Municipality and of the Etruscan Academy of Cortona	1	1260
Italy	Ferrara	Ariostea Municipal Library	2	581, 582
Italy	Florence	Laurentian Library	49	182, 183, 184, 185, 186, 187, 188, 189, 190, 191, 192, 193, 194, 195, 196, 197, 198, 199, 200, 362, 363, 364, 365, 366, 367, 454, 455, 456, 457, 458, 459, 619, 620, 832, 833, 834, 835, 836, 1919, 1920, 1921, 1922, 1976, 1977, 1978, 1979, 2007, 2035, 2052
Italy	Florence	Riccardian Library	4	368, 369, 370, 1958
Italy	Florence	National Central Library	1	2572
Italy	Genoa	Franzoniana Library	2	1798, 2573
Italy	Grottaferrata	Exarchist Monastery of Saint Mary	12	824, 825, 826, 827, 828, 829, 830, 831, 1836, 1837, 1838, 2854
Italy	Messina	University of Messina	6	420, 637, 839, 840, 1839, 2053
Italy	Milan	Braidense National Library	2	1814, 2945
Italy	Milan	Ambrosiana Library	34	343, 344, 345, 346, 347, 348, 349, 350, 351, 352, 353, 587, 588, 589, 592, 614, 615, 616, 837, 1941, 1942, 1943, 1980, 1981, 1982, 1983, 2090, 2574, 2575, 2576, 2577, 2578, 2579, 2890
Italy	Modena	Estense Library	12	358, 359, 585, 586, 618, 841, 842, 1270, 2054, 2055, 2125, 2288*
Italy	Naples	Victor Emmanuel III National Library	17	88, 108, 224, 225, 401, 402, 403, 635, 636, 843, 1912, 1984, 1985, 2019, 2042, 2126, 2581
Italy	Parma	Palatina Library	5	360, 361, 583, 584, 590
Italy	Padua	University of Padua	1	844
Italy	Palermo	Central Library	3	1954, 2127*, 2479
Italy	Pistoia	Fabroniana Library	1	845
Italy	Rome	Vallicelliana Library	9	169, 170, 171, 393, 394, 397, 632, 633, 2014
Italy	Rome	Angelica Library	7	178, 179, 846, 847, 848, 2056, 2057
Italy	Rome	Library of the National Lincei and Corsinian Academy	2	591, 2034
Italy	Rome	Casanata Library	4	395, 853, 1840, 1987
Italy	Turin	Turin National University Library	12	332, 333, 334, 335, 338, 339, 342, 612, 613, 2350, 2594
Italy	Venice	Marciana National Library	60	205, 207, 208, 209, 210, 211, 212, 213, 214, 215, 217, 354, 355, 357, 405, 406, 407, 408, 409, 410, 411, 412, 413, 414, 415, 416, 417, 418, 419, 460, 593, 595, 596, 597, 598, 599, 600, 617, 888, 889, 890, 891, 893, 894*, 1849, 1883, 1923, 1924, 1925, 1999, 2068, 2069, 2128, 2129, 2130, 2595, 2596, 2597, 2886, 2920
Italy	Venice	San Lazzaro Library	1	594
Macedonia	Ochrid	National Library	6	2623, 2624, 2625, 2626, 2627, 2629

[top]

=== N–T ===
Country	City	Institution	Count	List of Minuscule Manuscripts in Collection
Netherlands	Amsterdam	University of Amsterdam	1	90
Netherlands	Leiden	Leiden University Library	6	79, 122, 328, 435*, 1959, 2083
Netherlands	Groningen	University of Groningen	1	2003
New Zealand	Auckland	Public Library	1	1273
Norway	Oslo	Schøyen Collection	6	894*, 1421, 2483*, 2836, 2852, 2855
Poland	Krakow	Jagiellonian Library	11	255, 257, 433, 653*, 654, 658, 659, 661, 823, 1380, 1525
Poland	Krakow	Czartoryski Library	1	2478
Romania	Bucharest	Romanian Academy	10	2314, 2315, 2316, 2317, 2318, 2476, 2477, 2760, 2761, 2868
Romania	Bucharest	Museum of Religious Art	4	2472, 2554, 2555, 2767
Russia	Moscow	State Historical Museum	31	102, 103, 237, 238*, 239, 240, 242, 243, 244, 245, 246, 247, 248, 249, 252*, 259, 462, 463, 1309, 1310, 1926, 1927, 1928, 2023, 2024, 2134, 2135, 2136, 2137, 2545, 2546
Russia	Moscow	Russian State Library	8	251, 1375, 2132*, 2133, 2529, 2530, 2547, 2548
Russia	Moscow	Kremel Museum	1	2857
Russia	Moscow	Pushkin Museum	2	2858, 2859
Russia	Moscow	Russian State Archive of Ancient Acts	4	238*, 241, 252*, 2837
Russia	Moscow	Scientific Library of the State Gorky University	2	2030, 2138
Russia	Saint Petersburg	Russian National Library	72	330, 399, 461, 565, 566, 568, 569, 570, 571, 574, 575, 609*, 653*, 712*, 903*, 925*, 928*, 938*, 942*, 951*, 1205*, 1206*, 1209*, 1211*, 1220*, 1231*, 1238*, 1329*, 1334*, 1336*, 1338*, 1346*, 1348*, 1800, 1826, 1834, 1885*, 2043, 2132*, 2139, 2140, 2141, 2142, 2143, 2144, 2145, 2146, 2147, 2148, 2159*, 2160, 2172, 2173, 2174, 2175, 2176, 2177, 2178, 2179, 2180, 2181, 2182, 2199*, 2311*, 2538, 2539, 2540, 2541, 2542, 2543, 2544, 2687*
Russia	Saint Petersburg	Russian Academy of Sciences Historical Institute	14	1420*, 1858*, 2159*, 2267, 2269, 2273, 2274, 2275, 2500, 2534, 2535, 2536, 2549*, 2749
Russia	Saint Petersburg	State Hermitage Museum	1	2537
Serbia	Belgrade	National Library	1	2807
Slovakia	Bratislava	Slovak Academy of Sciences	1	86
Spain	San Lorenzo de El Escorial	Royal Site of San Lorenzo de El Escorial	27	226, 227, 228, 229, 230, 231, 232, 233, 818, 819, 820, 914, 915, 916, 917, 918, 919, 920, 921, 1835*, 1974, 2004, 2005, 2050, 2094, 2842, 2924
Spain	Madrid	National Library	6	821, 822, 1835*, 2051, 2403, 2812
Spain	Salamanca	University Library	1	2435
Sweden	Uppsala	Uppsala University	7	441, 442, 899, 900, 901, 902, 1852
Sweden	Gothenburg	Gothenburg University	2	2288*, 2441
Sweden	Stockholm	National Museum of Fine Arts	1	1049
Sweden	Linkoping	Linköping Diocesan Library	2	1851, 2600
Switzerland	Basel	Basel University Library	9	1, 2, 92, 817, 1420*, 2087, 2815, 2816, 2817
Switzerland	Bern	Burgerbibliothek	2	1283, 2491*
Switzerland	Cologny	Bodmer Library	1	556
Switzerland	Geneva	Geneva Library	2	75, 323
Turkey	Istanbul	Ecumenical Patriarchate	15	1144, 1145, 1146, 1147, 1149, 1868, 1869, 1870, 1871, 1872, 2470, 2505, 2506, 2507, 2750
Turkey	Istanbul	Museum Hagia Sophia	1	1808
Turkey	Istanbul	Library of the Serail	3	1286, 2362, 2471
Turkey	Ankara	Turkish Historical Society	3	649, 650, 1373
Turkey	Ankara	Archeological Museum	5	1802, 1803, 1804, 2335, 2439

[top]

=== U–Z ===
Country	City	Institution	Count	List of Minuscule Manuscripts in Collection
Ukraine	Kyiv	Central Scientific Library	1	1288
Ukraine	Kyiv	Vernadsky National Library	3	1672*, 2131, 2549*
Ukraine	Odesa	Odesa National Scientific Library	2	1360*, 2550
United Kingdom	Arundel	Arundel Castle	1	435*
United Kingdom	Birmingham	University of Birmingham Cadbury Research Library	6	236, 479, 531, 573, 713, 2108*
United Kingdom	Cambridge	Christ's College	2	319, 2914
United Kingdom	Cambridge	Corpus Christi College	1	288*
United Kingdom	Cambridge	Emmanuel College	1	356
United Kingdom	Cambridge	Fitzwilliam Museum	2	1281, 2098
United Kingdom	Cambridge	Gonville and Caius College	2	59, 718
United Kingdom	Cambridge	Trinity College	3	66, 477, 489
United Kingdom	Cambridge	Cambridge University Library	21	60, 70, 309, 398, 440, 443, 555, 672, 673, 674, 675, 896, 1277, 1850, 1907*, 2095, 2488, 2489, 2531, 2821, 2884
United Kingdom	Cheltenham	Cheltenham Ladies' College	1	717
United Kingdom	Edinburgh	Edinburgh University Library	3	563, 897, 898*
United Kingdom	Glasgow	Glasgow University Library	3	560, 561, 562
United Kingdom	Leicester	Leicestershire Record Office	1	69
United Kingdom	London	British Library	111	44, 65, 72, 81*, 104, 109, 110, 113, 114, 115, 116, 117, 201, 202, 203, 272, 308, 312, 321, 322, 384, 385, 438, 439, 444, 445, 446, 447, 448, 449, 476, 478, 480*, 481, 482, 484, 485, 490, 491, 492, 493, 494, 495, 496, 497, 498, 499, 500, 501, 502, 503, 504, 505, 547, 548, 549, 550, 551, 552, 553, 554, 640, 641, 643, 644, 645, 686, 687, 688, 689, 690, 691, 692, 693, 694, 695, 696, 697, 698, 699, 700, 714, 715, 716, 892, 910, 911, 912, 913, 1268, 1274, 1279, 1280, 1765, 1911, 1956, 1961, 2016, 2041, 2099, 2276, 2277, 2278, 2279, 2280, 2290, 2291, 2484, 2485, 2822, 2823
United Kingdom	London	Lambeth Palace	13	71, 206, 216, 470, 471, 472, 473, 474, 475, 486, 642, 1955, 2771
United Kingdom	London	Sion College	1	559
United Kingdom	London	Victoria and Albert Museum	1	1056*
United Kingdom	Manchester	John Rylands University Library	9	702, 1278, 2281, 2282, 2283, 2284, 2295, 2296, 2645*
United Kingdom	Oxford	Bodleian Library	61	45, 46, 47, 48, 49, 50, 51, 52, 53, 54, 55, 67, 96, 98, 105, 107, 111, 112, 118, 221, 288*, 314, 325, 378, 383, 521, 522, 523, 524, 525, 526, 527, 528, 529, 530, 557, 558, 665, 683, 684, 706, 707, 708, 709, 710, 1908, 2015, 2101, 2102, 2103, 2104, 2105, 2106, 2107, 2408, 2486, 2487, 2601, 2765, 2845, 2883
United Kingdom	Oxford	Christ Church	21	73, 74, 506, 507, 508, 509, 510, 511, 512, 513, 514, 515, 516, 517, 518, 519, 520, 638, 639, 2100, 2646
United Kingdom	Oxford	Corpus Christi College	1	2879
United Kingdom	Oxford	Lincoln College	5	56, 68, 95, 326, 2108*
United Kingdom	Oxford	Magdalen College	2	57, 1907*
United Kingdom	Oxford	New College	3	58, 327, 2818
United Kingdom	Oxford	Oriel College	1	711
United Kingdom	Oxford	St. John's College	1	2109
United Kingdom		Private Collection	1	2907
United States	Malibu, CA	J. Paul Getty Museum	3	679, 927*, 2894
United States	San Marino, CA	The Huntington Library	1	703
United States	Los Angeles, CA	University of California	2	712*, 2644
United States	Berkeley, CA	University of California, Berkeley	2	2641, 2642
United States	Riverside, CA	University of California, Riverside	1	2643
United States	New Haven, CT	Yale University Library	8	680, 1701, 2324, 2619, 2620, 2881, 2932, 2942
United States	Washington, DC	Museum of the Bible	6	64, 1361, 1429, 2813, 2860*, 2929
United States	Washington, DC	Dumbarton Oaks	5	669, 678, 705, 1142*, 1521*
United States	(Unknown)	The Van Kampen Foundation	9	682, 909, 2533, 2860*, 2892, 2893, 2895, 2896, 2897
United States	Chicago, IL	University of Chicago Library	26	677, 1152, 1290, 2222*, 2266, 2394, 2396, 2397, 2398*, 2399, 2400, 2401*, 2402, 2404, 2405, 2406, 2407, 2409, 2411, 2412, 2425, 2427**, 2474, 2608, 2610, 2751
United States	Chicago, IL	Newberry Library	1	1289
United States	Chicago, IL	Theological Seminary Library	1	2311*
United States	Chicago, IL	H.R. Willoughby (Private Collection)	1	1498*
United States	Maywood, IL	Lutheran School of Theology at Chicago	6	1282, 1826*, 2304, 2388, 2389, 2426
United States	Louisville, KY	Southern Baptist Theological Seminary	1	2358
United States	Williamstown, MA	Williams College	1	483
United States	Boston, MA	School of Theology Library	1	2811
United States	Cambridge, MA	Harvard University	6	666, 1142*, 2607, 2863, 2864, 2865
United States	Waltham, MA	Tufts University, Welch Collection	1	2938
United States	Wenham, MA	Gordon College	2	2752, 2753
United States	Baltimore, MD	Walters Art Museum	17	647, 1022, 1356, 1474*, 1498*, 1531, 1696*, 2191*, 2222*, 2368*, 2369, 2370, 2371, 2372, 2373, 2374, 2375
United States	Ann Arbor, MI	University of Michigan	21	223, 532, 533, 534, 535, 536, 537, 538, 540, 541, 543, 544, 545, 546, 685, 876, 2353, 2354, 2363, 2364, 2365
United States	Durham, NC	Duke University	17	1423, 1780, 1813, 2268, 2423, 2491*, 2612, 2613, 2614, 2615, 2616, 2757, 2766, 2794, 2861, 2862, 2957
United States	Madison, NJ	Drew University	2	1960, 2326
United States	Princeton, NJ	Princeton University	15	895, 905, 906, 1056*, 1357, 1397*, 1528, 1530, 1693, 1799, 2367, 2386*, 2420, 2491*, 2621
United States	Syracuse, NY	Syracuse University	1	668
United States	New York, NY	General Theological Seminary	1	2380
United States	New York, NY	New York Public Library	1	2421
United States	New York, NY	Union Theological Seminary	1	2911
United States	New York, NY	Columbia University	1	2460*
United States	New York, NY	Morgan Library & Museum	5	1795*, 2382, 2383, 2385, 2386*
United States	New York, NY	Rare Book and Manuscript Library	1	2491*
United States	Woodbury, NY	Daniel P. Buttafuoco Library	1	2805
United States	Cleveland, OH	Cleveland Museum of Art	2	1521*, 2381
United States	King of Prussia, PA	J. F. Reed Library	1	2844
United States	Philadelphia, PA	Free Library	1	2127*
United States	Austin, TX	University of Texas	1	2322
United States	Houston, TX	Bible Museum at Houston Baptist University	2	2878, 2944
United States	Plano, TX	Center for the Study of New Testament Manuscripts	1	2882
The Vatican	The Vatican	Vatican Library	216	127, 128, 129, 130, 131, 132, 133, 134, 135, 136, 137, 138, 139, 140, 141, 142, 143, 144, 145, 146, 147, 148, 149, 150, 151, 152, 153, 154, 155, 156, 157, 158, 159, 160, 161, 162, 163, 164, 165, 166, 167, 168, 173, 174, 175, 176, 180, 181, 371, 372, 373, 374, 375, 376, 377, 379, 380, 381, 382, 386, 387, 388, 389, 390, 391, 392, 396, 432, 436, 437, 450, 451, 452, 453, 621, 622, 623, 624, 625, 626, 627, 628, 629, 630, 631, 634, 849, 850, 852, 854, 855, 856, 857, 858, 859, 860, 861, 862, 863, 864, 865, 866, 867, 868, 869, 870, 871, 872, 873, 874, 875, 877, 878, 879, 880, 881, 882, 883, 884, 885, 886, 887, 1269, 1366, 1817, 1818, 1819, 1820, 1821, 1822, 1823, 1824, 1842, 1843, 1844, 1845, 1846, 1847, 1848*, 1914, 1915, 1916, 1917, 1918, 1945, 1946, 1947, 1948, 1949, 1950, 1951, 1952, 1957, 1967, 1968, 1986, 1988, 1991, 1992, 1993, 1994, 1995, 1996, 1997, 1998, 2006, 2008, 2020, 2021, 2022, 2031, 2032, 2033, 2036, 2058, 2059, 2060, 2061, 2062, 2063, 2064, 2065, 2066, 2067, 2195, 2359, 2361, 2432, 2480, 2481, 2582, 2583, 2584, 2585, 2586, 2587, 2588, 2589, 2590, 2591, 2592, 2593, 2737, 2738, 2739, 2740, 2741, 2742, 2743, 2759, 2769, 2770, 2839, 2899, 2918, 2919
		Unknown owner/lost	60	253, 539, 542, 667, 670, 671, 681, 701, 810, 813, 814, 851, 984, 1051, 1109, 1184, 1246, 1275, 1276, 1287, 1381, 1430, 1708, 1711, 1782, 1785, 1796, 1801, 1805, 1806, 1809, 1810, 1811, 1989, 1990, 2115, 2116, 2198, 2216, 2222*, 2264, 2271, 2311*, 2319, 2320, 2330, 2331, 2332, 2337, 2338, 2339, 2340, 2341, 2342, 2346, 2438, 2448, 2853, 2943, 2946
		Destroyed/Presumed destroyed	30	258, 340, 341, 480*, 611, 907, 908, 1257, 1258, 1259, 1378, 1433, 1527, 1529, 1833, 1940, 2039, 2088, 2093, 2225, 2226, 2227, 2228, 2230, 2231, 2232, 2233, 2234, 2235, 2262

[top]

== See also ==
- List of artifacts significant to the Bible
- List of New Testament Latin manuscripts
- List of New Testament lectionaries
- List of New Testament amulets
- List of New Testament papyri
- List of New Testament uncials

== Bibliography ==
- Aland, Kurt; M. Welte; B. Köster; K. Junack (1994). Kurzgefasste Liste der griechischen Handschriften des Neues Testaments. Berlin, New York: Walter de Gruyter. p. 95. ISBN 3-11-011986-2.
- "Liste Handschriften". Münster: Institute for New Testament Textual Research.
- Parpulov, Georgi (2021). Catena Manuscripts of the Greek New Testament (PDF). Piscataway New Jersey: Gorgias Press. p. 241. ISBN 978-1-4632-4260-2.
