= List of New Testament minuscules (201–300) =

A New Testament minuscule is a copy of a portion of the New Testament written in a small, cursive Greek script (developed from Uncial).

== Legend ==
- The numbers (#) are the now standard system of Caspar René Gregory, often referred to as the Gregory-Aland numbers.
- Included among the cataloged minuscules are the following types of manuscripts, color coded:

Grey represents continuous text manuscripts containing only New Testament portions
Beige represents manuscripts with New Testament portions and a catena (quotations from church fathers)
Light cyan represents manuscripts of single-author commentaries who included the full Scripture text.
Light red represents manuscripts of single-author commentaries who included both the full Scripture text and a catena.
Light purple represents manuscripts of commentaries where the Scripture text was abridged.
White represents manuscript numbers no longer in use.

- Dates are estimated to the nearest 100 year increment where specific date is unknown.
- Content generally only describes sections of the New Testament: Gospels, The Acts of the Apostles (Acts), Pauline epistles, and so on. Sometimes the surviving portion of a codex is so limited that specific books, chapters or even verses can be indicated. Linked articles, where they exist, generally specify content in detail, by verse.
- Digital images are referenced with direct links to the hosting web pages, with the exception of those at the INTF. The quality and accessibility of the images is as follows:

Gold color indicates high resolution color images available online.
Tan color indicates high resolution color images available locally, not online.
Light tan color indicates only a small fraction of manuscript pages with color images available online.
Light gray color indicates black/white or microfilm images available online.
Light blue color indicates manuscript not imaged, and is currently lost or ownership unknown.
Light pink color indicates manuscript destroyed, presumed destroyed, or deemed too fragile to digitize.
Violet color indicates high resolution ultraviolet images available online.

† Indicates the manuscript has damaged or missing pages.
^{P} Indicates only a portion of the books were included.
^{K} Indicates manuscript also includes a commentary.
^{S} Indicates lost portions of manuscript replaced via supplement of a later hand.
^{abs} (abschrift) Indicates manuscript is copy.
[ ] Brackets around Gregory-Aland number indicate the manuscript belongs to an already numbered manuscript, was found to not be a continuous text manuscript, was found to be written in modern Greek versus Koine Greek, was proved a forgery, or has been destroyed.

== Minuscules 201-300 ==
#	Date	Contents	Pages	Institution and refs.	City, State	Country	Images
201	1357	New Testament	493	British Library, Add MS 11837	London	UK	BL
201	1357	New Testament	493	British Library, Add MS 11837	London	UK	INTF
202	12th	Gospels	278	British Library, Add MS 14774	London	UK	BL
202	12th	Gospels	278	British Library, Add MS 14774	London	UK	INTF
203	1111	Acts, Pauline Epistles, General Epistles, Revelation (no commentary)	149	British Library, Add MS 28816	London	UK	BL
203	1111	Acts, Pauline Epistles, General Epistles, Revelation (no commentary)	149	British Library, Add MS 28816	London	UK	INTF
204	13th/14th	Gospels, Acts, Pauline Epistles, General Epistles	443	University of Bologna, 2775	Bologna	Italy	INTF
205	15th	New Testament	80	Marciana National Library, Gr. Z 5 (420)	Venice	Italy	INTF, CSNTM
[205^{abs}]= 2886							
206	13th	Acts†, Pauline Epistles, General Epistles†	397	Lambeth Palace, MS1182	London	UK	CSNTM
207	11th	Gospels†	267	Marciana National Library, Gr. Z 8 (378)	Venice	Italy	INTF
208	11th	Gospels	239	Marciana National Library, Gr. Z 9 (664)	Venice	Italy	INTF
209	14th	Gospels, Acts, Pauline Epistles, General Epistles	381	Marciana National Library, Gr. Z. 10 (394), fol. 1-381	Venice	Italy	INTF, CSNTM
210	11th	Gospels†	372	Marciana National Library, Gr. Z 27 (341)	Venice	Italy	INTF
211	12th	Gospels†	280	Marciana National Library, Gr. Z 539 (303)	Venice	Italy	INTF
212	11th	Gospels†	273	Marciana National Library, Gr. Z 540 (557)	Venice	Italy	INTF
213	11th	Gospels†	356	Marciana National Library, Gr. Z 542 (409)	Venice	Italy	INTF
214	14th	Gospels	227	Marciana National Library, Gr. Z 543 (409)	Venice	Italy	INTF
215	11th	Gospels	272	Marciana National Library, Gr. Z 544 (591)	Venice	Italy	INTF
216	1358	Acts, Pauline Epistles†, General Epistles	236	Lambeth Palace, MS1183	London	UK	CSNTM
217	12th	Gospels	299	Marciana National Library, Gr. I, 3 (944)	Venice	Italy	INTF
218	13th	New Testament†	138	Austrian National Library, Theol. gr. 23, NT: fol. 486-623	Vienna	Austria	INTF, CSNTM
219	13th	Gospels	232	Austrian National Library, Theol. gr. 321	Vienna	Austria	INTF, CSNTM
220	13th	Gospels	303	Austrian National Library, Theol. gr. 337	Vienna	Austria	CSNTM, INTF
221	10th	Acts, Pauline Epistles, General Epistles	382	Bodleian Library, Canon. Gr. 110	Oxford	UK	INTF
221	10th	Acts, Pauline Epistles, General Epistles	382	Bodleian Library, Canon. Gr. 110	Oxford	UK	DB
222	14th	Gospels†	346	Austrian National Library, Theol. gr. 180	Vienna	Austria	INTF, CSNTM
223	14th	Acts†, Pauline Epistles†, General Epistles†	376	University of Michigan Library, Ms. 34	Ann Arbor	USA	CSNTM, INTF
224	12th	Matthew	97	Victor Emmanuel III National Library, Vind. 10	Naples	Italy	INTF
225	1192	Gospels	171	Victor Emmanuel III National Library, Vind. 9	Naples	Italy	INTF
226	12th	Gospels, Acts, Pauline Epistles, General Epistles	377	Royal Site of San Lorenzo de El Escorial, X, IV, 17	San Lorenzo de El Escorial	Spain	INTF
227	13th	Gospels	158	Royal Site of San Lorenzo de El Escorial, X, III, 15	San Lorenzo de El Escorial	Spain	INTF
228	14th	Gospels, Acts, Romans - Titus	126	Royal Site of San Lorenzo de El Escorial, X, IV, 12	San Lorenzo de El Escorial	Spain	INTF
229	1140	Gospels†	297	Royal Site of San Lorenzo de El Escorial, X, IV, 21	San Lorenzo de El Escorial	Spain	CSNTM, INTF
230	1013	Gospels	218	Royal Site of San Lorenzo de El Escorial, y, III, 5	San Lorenzo de El Escorial	Spain	INTF, CSNTM
231	12th	Gospels	181	Royal Site of San Lorenzo de El Escorial, y, III, 6	San Lorenzo de El Escorial	Spain	INTF
232	1302	Gospels	289	Royal Site of San Lorenzo de El Escorial, y, III, 7	San Lorenzo de El Escorial	Spain	INTF
233	13th	Gospels†	279	Royal Site of San Lorenzo de El Escorial, Y, II, 8	San Lorenzo de El Escorial	Spain	INTF
234	1278	Gospels, Acts, Pauline Epistles, General Epistles	315	Royal Danish Library, GKS 1322	Copenhagen	Denmark	INTF
235	1314	Gospels	280	Royal Danish Library, GKS 1323	Copenhagen	Denmark	INTF
236	11th	Gospels†	256	University of Birmingham Cadbury Research Library, Braithwaite 13	Birmingham	UK	INTF
237	11th	Gospels	289	State Historical Museum, V. 85, S. 41	Moscow	Russia	INTF
238	11th/12th	Gospels	355	State Historical Museum, Sinod. gr. 47 (Vlad. 091)	Moscow	Russia	INTF
238	11th/12th	Gospels	226	Russian State Archive of Ancient Acts, Ф. 1607, Nr. 3	Moscow	Russia	
239	11th	Mark, Luke, John	277	State Historical Museum, V. 84, S. 46	Moscow	Russia	INTF
240	12th	Zigabenus Commentary on the Gospels†	411	State Historical Museum, V. 87, S. 48	Moscow	Russia	INTF
241	11th	New Testament	353	Russian State Archive of Ancient Acts, Ф. 1607 14	Moscow	Russia	INTF
242	12th	New Testament	409	State Historical Museum, V. 25, S. 407	Moscow	Russia	
243	14th	Theophylact Commentary on Matthew, Luke	224	State Historical Museum, V. 92, S. 388	Moscow	Russia	INTF
244	12th	Zigabenus Commentary on the Gospels	274	State Historical Museum, V. 88, S. 220	Moscow	Russia	INTF
245	1199	Gospels	255	State Historical Museum, V. 16, S. 278	Moscow	Russia	INTF
246	14th	Gospels†	189	State Historical Museum, V. 19, S. 274	Moscow	Russia	INTF
247	12th	Gospels	222	State Historical Museum, V. 17, S. 400	Moscow	Russia	INTF
248	1275	Gospels	261	State Historical Museum, V. 18, S. 277	Moscow	Russia	INTF
249	12th	Gospel of John (Nicetas Catena)	808	State Historical Museum, V. 90, S. 93	Moscow	Russia	INTF
250	11th	Acts, Pauline Epistles, General Epistles, Revelation	379	National Library, Coislin 224	Paris	France	BnF, INTF
251	12th	Gospels	273	Russian State Library, F. 181.9 (Gr. 9)	Moscow	Russia	CSNTM, INTF
252 + [464]	11th	Gospels	123	Russian State Archive of Ancient Acts, Ф. 1607, Nr. 05	Moscow	Russia	INTF
252 + [464]	11th	Acts, Pauline Epistles, General Epistles	229	State Historical Museum, V. 23, S. 341	Moscow	Russia	INTF
253	10th	Gospels	248	Owner Unknown			
254	11th	Theophylact Commentary on Acts, Pauline Epistles, General Epistles, Revelation	453	National Library, 490	Athens	Greece	CSNTM
254	11th	Theophylact Commentary on Acts, Pauline Epistles, General Epistles, Revelation	453	National Library, 490	Athens	Greece	INTF
255	14th	Acts, Pauline Epistle], General Epistles	222	Jagiellonian Library Graec. qu. 40?	Kraków	Poland	
256	11th/12th	Acts†, Pauline Epistles†, General Epistles†, Revelation†	323	National Library, Armenien 27 (9)	Paris	France	INTF
257	14th	Acts, Pauline Epistles, General Epistles	116	Jagiellonian Library, Graec. qu. 43?	Kraków	Poland	
258	13th	Gospels	168	Saxon State and University Library Dresden (SLUB), Mscr. Dresd. A. 123	Dresden	Germany	INTF
259	10th	Gospels	262	State Historical Museum, V. 86, S. 44	Moscow	Russia	INTF
260	13th	Gospels	240	National Library, Grec 51	Paris	France	BnF, INTF, CSNTM
261	12th	Gospels†	175	National Library, Grec 52	Paris	France	BnF, INTF, CSNTM
262	10th	Gospels	212	National Library, Grec 53	Paris	France	INTF
263	13th	Gospels, Acts, Pauline Epistles, General Epistles	294	National Library, Grec 61	Paris	France	BnF, INTF, CSNTM
264	12th	Gospels†	287	National Library, Grec 65	Paris	France	BnF, INTF, CSNTM
265	12th	Gospels	372	National Library, Grec 66	Paris	France	BnF, INTF, CSNTM
266	13th	Gospels	282	National Library, Grec 67	Paris	France	BnF, INTF, CSNTM
267	12th	Gospels†	396	National Library, Grec 69	Paris	France	BnF, INTF, CSNTM
268	12th	Gospels	217	National Library, Grec 73	Paris	France	BnF, INTF, CSNTM
269	12th	Gospels	215	National Library, Grec 74	Paris	France	BnF, INTF, CSNTM
270	12th	Gospels	346	National Library, Grec 75	Paris	France	BnF, INTF, CSNTM
271	11th	Gospels	252	National Library, Supplement Grec 75	Paris	France	BnF, INTF
272	11th	Gospels	218	British Library, Add MS 15581	London	UK	BL
272	11th	Gospels	218	British Library, Add MS 15581	London	UK	INTF
273	13th	Gospels†	201	National Library, Grec 79	Paris	France	BnF, INTF
274	10th	Gospels†	232	National Library, Supplement Grec 79	Paris	France	BnF, INTF
275	12th	Gospels	230	National Library, Grec 80	Paris	France	BnF, INTF, CSNTM
276	1092	Gospels	307	National Library, Grec 81	Paris	France	BnF, INTF
277	11th	Gospels	261	National Library, Grec 81 A	Paris	France	INTF
278	1072	Gospels†	296	National Library, Grec 82	Paris	France	BnF, INTF, CSNTM
279	12th	Gospels	250	National Library, Grec 86	Paris	France	BnF, INTF, CSNTM
280	12th	Gospels	170	National Library, Grec 87	Paris	France	BnF, INTF, CSNTM
281	12th	Gospels†	249	National Library, Grec 88	Paris	France	BnF, INTF, CSNTM
282	1176	Gospels	150	National Library, Grec 90	Paris	France	BnF, INTF, CSNTM
283	13th	Gospels†	159	National Library, Grec 92	Paris	France	BnF, INTF, CSNTM
284	13th	Gospels	254	National Library, Grec 93	Paris	France	BnF, INTF, CSNTM
285	15th	Gospels	246	National Library, Grec 95	Paris	France	BnF, INTF, CSNTM
286	1432	Gospels	264	National Library, Grec 96	Paris	France	BnF, INTF
287	1482	Gospels	322	National Library, Grec 98	Paris	France	BnF, INTF, CSNTM
288 + [2532]	15th	Matthew	90	Bodleian Library, Canon. Gr. 33	Oxford	UK	INTF
288 + [2532]	15th	Mark	56	Corpus Christi College, MS. 224	Cambridge	UK	PL
288 + [2532]	15th	Luke	93	National Library, Grec 99	Paris	France	BnF, INTF
288 + [2532]	15th	John	67	Institut de France, Ms 536	Paris	France	INTF
289	1625	Gospels	336	National Library, Grec 100 A	Paris	France	INTF
290	14th	Gospels	259	National Library, Supplement Grec 108	Paris	France	BnF, INTF
291	13th	Gospels	290	National Library, Grec 113	Paris	France	BnF, INTF, CSNTM
292	12th/13th	Gospels†	290	National Library, Grec 114	Paris	France	BnF, INTF, CSNTM
293	1262	Gospels†	340	National Library, Grec 117	Paris	France	BnF, INTF
294	1391	Gospels†	238	National Library, Grec 118	Paris	France	BnF, INTF, CSNTM
295	13th	Gospels	239	National Library, Grec 120	Paris	France	BnF, INTF, CSNTM
[296]	16th	New Testament copied from printed text.	560	National Library, Grec 123, Grec 124	Paris	France	BnF, INTF, CSNTM
297	12th	Gospels	196	National Library, Supplement Grec 140	Paris	France	INTF
298	12th	Gospels	222	National Library, Supplement Grec 175	Paris	France	BnF, INTF
299	10th	Gospels	328	National Library, Grec 177	Paris	France	BnF, INTF, CSNTM
300	11th	Matthew, Mark, Luke	209	National Library, Grec 186	Paris	France	BnF, INTF, CSNTM

[top]

== See also ==
- List of New Testament papyri
- List of New Testament uncials
- List of New Testament minuscules (1–1000)
- List of New Testament minuscules (1001–2000)
- List of New Testament minuscules (2001–)
- List of New Testament minuscules ordered by Location/Institution
- List of New Testament lectionaries

== Bibliography ==
- Aland, Kurt; M. Welte; B. Köster; K. Junack (1994). Kurzgefasste Liste der griechischen Handschriften des Neues Testaments. Berlin, New York: Walter de Gruyter. p. 95. ISBN 3-11-011986-2.
- "Liste Handschriften". Münster: Institute for New Testament Textual Research.
