= Minuscule 240 =

- New Testament manuscript
- Text: Gospels †
- Date: 12th century
- Script: Greek
- Now at: State Historical Museum
- Size: 33.5 cm by 22 cm
- Type: Byzantine text-type
- Category: V

Minuscule 240 is a Greek minuscule manuscript of the New Testament, made of parchment. It is designated by the siglum 240 in the Gregory-Aland numbering of New Testament manuscripts, and ε21 in the von Soden numbering of New Testament manuscripts. Using the study of comparative writing styles (palaeography), it had been assigned to the 12th century. It contains a commentary of Euthymius Zigabenus.

== Description ==
The manuscript is a codex (precursor to the modern book format), containing the text of the four Gospels on 411 parchment leaves (sized 33.5 cm by 22 cm), with some gaps: Mark 8:12-34; 14:17-54; and Luke 15:32-16:8. The text is written in one column per page, 33-39 lines per page.

It contains table of contents (known as κεφαλαια / kephalaia) before each Gospel. The biblical text is accompanied by a commentary of Euthymius Zigabenus, with the commentary being interspersed with the biblical text. The biblical text written in red, the text of a commentary in black ink.

== Text ==
The Greek text of the codex is considered to be a representative of the Byzantine text-type. Biblical scholar Kurt Aland placed it in Category V of his New Testament manuscript classification system. Category V manuscripts are described as "manuscripts with a purely or predominantly Byzantine text." It was not examined by the Claremont Profile Method (a specific analysis of textual data).

== History ==
The earliest history of the manuscript is unknown. It was formerly held in the monastery of Philotheus at Mount Athos, then in the Dionysius monastery. During the reign of Alexei Mikhailovich Romanov (1645-1676), the monk Arsenius brought it from Athos to Moscow, on the suggestion of the Patriarch Nikon. The manuscript was collated by palaeographer and philologist Christian F. Matthaei.

It is currently dated by the INTF to the 12th century. It is presently housed at the State Historical Museum (shelf number V. 87, S. 48) at Moscow.

== See also ==
- Minuscule 241
- Minuscule 239
- List of New Testament minuscules
- Biblical manuscript
- Textual criticism
