= Lectionary 56 =

Lectionary ℓ 56
- New Testament manuscript
- Text: Evangelistarion, Apostolos †
- Date: 15th-century
- Script: Greek
- Found: 1655
- Now at: State Historical Museum
- Size: 15.5 cm by 10.5 cm
- Note: little value

Lectionary 56, designated by siglum ℓ 56 (in the Gregory-Aland numbering), is a Greek manuscript of the New Testament, on paper leaves. Palaeographically it has been assigned to the 15th-century.

== Description ==
The codex contains only six lessons from the New Testament. It is a lectionary (Evangelistarion and Apostolos). It is written in Greek minuscule letters, on 462 paper leaves (15.5 cm by 10.5 cm). The writing is in one column per page, in 19 lines per page, in very small minuscule letters. It contains Synaxarion and homilies of Church Fathers. Text of lectionary is only on the folios 15-18, 409-410. According to Scrivener they are "fragments of little value".

== History ==
The manuscript came from Athos peninsula in 1655. It was examined by Matthaei.

The manuscript is not cited in the critical editions of the Greek New Testament (UBS3).

Currently the codex is located in the State Historical Museum (V. 392, S. 466), in Moscow.

== See also ==
- List of New Testament lectionaries
- Biblical manuscript
- Textual criticism
