= Minuscule 248 =

- New Testament manuscript
- Text: Gospels
- Date: 1275
- Script: Greek
- Now at: State Historical Museum
- Size: 15.5 cm by 12 cm
- Type: Byzantine text-type
- Category: V
- Note: close to 71

Minuscule 248 is a Greek minuscule manuscript of the New Testament, made of parchment. It is designated by the siglum 248 in the Gregory-Aland numbering of New Testament manuscripts, and ε 395 in the von Soden numbering of New Testament manuscripts. It is dated by a colophon to the year 1275. It has marginalia.

== Description ==
The manuscript is a codex (precursor to the modern book format), containing the complete text of the four Gospels on 261 parchment leaves (sized 15.5 cm by 12 cm). The text is written in one column per page, 26 lines per page.

It contains tables of contents (known as κεφαλαια / kephalaia) before each Gospel (written on paper), references to the Eusebian Canons, and lectionary markings in the margin for liturgical use. The Synaxarion was added by a later hand.

== Text ==
The Greek text of the codex is considered to be a representative of the Byzantine text-type. Biblical scholar Kurt Aland placed it in Category V of his New Testament manuscript classification system. Category V manuscripts are described as "manuscripts with a purely or predominantly Byzantine text."

It is textually close to Minuscule 71. According to the Claremont Profile Method (a specific analysis of textual data), it has a mixture of the Byzantine text-families in Luke 1 and Luke 10. In Luke 20 it represents cluster M27.

== History ==
The manuscript was written by Meletius, a Beroean, for Cyrus Alypius the οικονομος of St. George's monastery, during the reign of Michael Palaeologus (1259-1282). The manuscript was collated by philologist Christian F. Matthaei.

The manuscript was formerly held at the Philotheus monastery at Mount Athos. During the reign of Alexei Mikhailovich Romanov (1645-1676), the monk Arsenius brought it to Moscow on the suggestion of the Patriarch Nikon. The manuscript is currently housed at the State Historical Museum (shelf number V. 18, S. 277) in Moscow.

== See also ==
- Minuscule 249
- Minuscule 247
- List of New Testament minuscules
- Biblical manuscript
- Textual criticism
