= Lectionary 62 =

Lectionary ℓ 62
- New Testament manuscript
- Text: Apostolos
- Date: 12th-century
- Script: Greek
- Now at: State Historical Museum
- Size: 25.5 cm by 18.5 cm

Lectionary 62, designated by siglum ℓ 62 (in the Gregory-Aland numbering), is a Greek manuscript of the New Testament, on parchment leaves. Palaeographically it has been assigned to the 12th-century.

== Description ==
The codex contains lessons from the Acts of the Apostles and Epistles. It is a lectionary (Apostolos) with lacunae at the end. It is written in Greek minuscule letters, on 276 parchment leaves (25.5 cm by 18.5 cm), in one column per page, in 24 (and more) lines per page.

== History ==
The manuscript was brought from Constantinople. It was examined by Matthaei. I was added to the list of New Testament manuscripts by Scholz.

The manuscript is sporadically cited in the critical editions of the Greek New Testament (UBS3).

Currently the codex is located in the State Historical Museum, (V. 23, S. 304) in Moscow.

== See also ==
- List of New Testament lectionaries
- Biblical manuscript
- Textual criticism
