= Lectionary 53 =

Lectionary ℓ 53
- New Testament manuscript
- Text: Evangelistarion, Apostolos
- Date: 15th-century
- Script: Greek
- Now at: State Historical Museum
- Size: 21.8 cm by 14.4 cm

Lectionary 53, designated by siglum ℓ 53 (in the Gregory-Aland numbering), is a Greek manuscript of the New Testament, on paper leaves. Palaeographically it has been assigned to the 15th century.

== Description ==
The codex is an Euchologium with lessons from the New Testament lectionary (Apostoloevangelia), on 332 paper leaves (21.8 cm by 14.4 cm), with some lacunae. The text is written in one column per page, in 24 lines per page, in Greek minuscule letters.

== History ==
The manuscript came from the monastery of Simenus on the Athos. The manuscript was examined by Matthaei.

The manuscript is sporadically cited in the critical editions of the Greek New Testament (UBS3).

Currently the codex is located in the State Historical Museum, (V. 262, S. 280) in Moscow.

== See also ==
- List of New Testament lectionaries
- Biblical manuscript
- Textual criticism
