= Lectionary 52 =

Lectionary ℓ 52
- New Testament manuscript
- Text: Evangelistarion, Apostolos
- Date: 14th-century
- Script: Greek
- Now at: State Historical Museum
- Size: 23.3 cm by 16.5 cm

Lectionary 52, designated by siglum ℓ 52 (in the Gregory-Aland numbering). It is a Greek manuscript of the New Testament, on parchment leaves. Palaeographically it has been assigned to the 14th century.

== Description ==
The codex is an Euchologium with lessons from the Gospels, Acts of the Apostles and Epistles lectionary (Apostoloeuangelia), on 244 parchment leaves (23.3 cm by 16.5 cm), with some lacune. The text is written in one column per page, in 17-19 lines per page, in Greek minuscule letters. It contains also some lessons from the Old Testament.

== History ==
The manuscript was examined by Matthaei.

The manuscript is not cited in the critical editions of the Greek New Testament (UBS3).

Currently the codex is located in the State Historical Museum, (V. 261, S. 279) in Moscow.

== See also ==
- List of New Testament lectionaries
- Biblical manuscript
- Textual criticism
