= Minuscule 259 =

- New Testament manuscript
- Text: Gospels
- Date: 11th century
- Script: Greek
- Now at: State Historical Museum
- Size: 28.5 cm by 21 cm
- Type: Byzantine text-type
- Category: V
- Note: marginalia

Minuscule 259 (in the Gregory-Aland numbering), A^{122} (Soden), is a Greek minuscule manuscript of the New Testament, on parchment. Paleographically it has been assigned to the 11th century. It has marginalia.

== Description ==
The codex contains the text of the four Gospels on 263 parchment leaves (28.5 cm by 21 cm). The biblical text is surrounded by a catena.

The text is divided according to the Ammonian Sections, whose numbers are given at the margin, with references to the Eusebian Canons (written below Ammonian Section numbers).

It contains the Epistula ad Carpianum, Eusebian tables, Prolegomena, tables of the κεφαλαια (tables of contents), Menologion, Synaxarion, and commentaries (Victor's on Mark).

== Text ==
The Greek text of the codex is a representative of the Byzantine text-type. Aland placed it in Category V. It was not examined by the Claremont Profile Method.

The Pericope Adulterae (John 7:53-8:11) is placed at the end of John after 21:25. Text is close to codex 250.

== History ==
Formerly the manuscript was held at the Iviron monastery at Athos peninsula. It was brought to Moscow, by the monk Arsenius, on the suggestion of the Patriarch Nikon, in the reign of Alexei Mikhailovich Romanov (1645–1676). The manuscript was collated and examined by C. F. Matthaei. According to Scrivener it was one of the best manuscript examined by Matthaei.

The manuscript is currently housed at the State Historical Museum (V. 86, S. 44) at Moscow.

== See also ==
- List of New Testament minuscules
- Biblical manuscript
- Textual criticism
