= Lectionary 51 =

Greek manuscript of the New Testament

Lectionary ℓ 51
- New Testament manuscript
- Text: Evangelistarion
- Date: 14th-century
- Script: Greek
- Now at: State Historical Museum
- Size: 21.5 cm by 16.5 cm

Lectionary 51, designated by siglum ℓ 51 (in the Gregory-Aland numbering). It is a Greek manuscript of the New Testament, on paper leaves. Palaeographically it has been assigned to the 14th-century.

== Description ==
The codex contains lessons from the Gospels of John, Matthew, Luke lectionary (Evangelistarium), on 44 paper leaves (21.5 cm by 16.5 cm), with some lacunae. The text is written in one column per page, in 19 lines per page, in Greek minuscule letters. The leaves are arranged in quarto, it has pictures.

== History ==
The manuscript was examined by Matthaei. Currently the codex is located in the State Historical Museum, (V. 20, S. 474) in Moscow.

The manuscript is sporadically cited in the critical editions of the Greek New Testament (UBS3).

== See also ==
- List of New Testament lectionaries
- Biblical manuscript
- Textual criticism
