= Lectionary 50 =

Lectionary ℓ 50
- New Testament manuscript
- Text: Evangelistarion
- Date: 11th-century
- Script: Greek
- Now at: State Historical Museum
- Size: 37 cm by 27 cm

Lectionary 50, designated by siglum ℓ 50 (in the Gregory-Aland numbering), is a Greek manuscript of the New Testament, on parchment leaves. Palaeographically it has been assigned to the 11th century.

== Description ==
The codex contains lessons from the Gospels of John, Matthew, Luke lectionary (Evangelistarium), on 231 parchment leaves (37 cm by 27 cm), with some lacunae at the beginning. It is written in two columns per page, in 17 and more lines per page, in Greek uncial letters. Full of itacismus, it contains musical notes.

According to Scrivener it is a very valuable copy.

== History ==
The manuscript was examined by Matthaei and dated by him to the 14th century. Currently the codex is located in the State Historical Museum (V. 10, S. 226) in Moscow.

The manuscript is not cited in the critical editions of the Greek New Testament (UBS3).

== See also ==
- List of New Testament lectionaries
- Biblical manuscript
- Textual criticism
