= Minuscule 242 =

- New Testament manuscript
- Text: New Testament, Psalms
- Date: 12th century
- Script: Greek
- Now at: State Historical Museum
- Size: 17 cm by 12.5 cm
- Category: none

Minuscule 242 (in the Gregory-Aland numbering), δ 206 (Soden), is a Greek minuscule manuscript of the New Testament, on parchment. Palaeographically it has been assigned to the 12th century.

== Description ==
The codex contains entire of the New Testament with Book of Psalms, on 409 parchment leaves – 510 with Psalms – (size 17 cm by 12.5 cm). The text is written in one column per page, 24 lines per page. The order of books: Gospels, Acts, Catholic epistles, Pauline epistles, Apocalypse, and Psalms.

It contains Prolegomena, a division according to the Ammonian Sections, the Eusebian Canon tables before each Gospel, Synaxarion, Menologion, the Euthalian Apparatus and pictures.

== Text ==
In Acts 1:10.11 the manuscript omits phrase εἰς τὸν οὐρανόν together with the manuscripts: Codex Bezae, 33^{c}, 326*.

Kurt Aland the Greek text of the codex did not place in any Category. It was not examined by the Claremont Profile Method.

== History ==
Formerly the manuscript was held at Athos peninsula. It was brought to Moscow, by the monk Arsenius, on the suggestion of the Patriarch Nikon, in the reign of Alexei Mikhailovich Romanov (1645-1676). The manuscript was collated by C. F. Matthaei. It was examined by Kurt Treu in 1958.

The manuscript is currently housed at the State Historical Museum (V. 25, S. 407) at Moscow.

== See also ==
- List of New Testament minuscules
- Biblical manuscript
- Textual criticism
