= Minuscule 238 =

- New Testament manuscript
- Text: Gospels
- Date: 11th/12th century
- Script: Greek
- Now at: State Historical Museum
- Size: 31 cm by 22 cm
- Category: none
- Note: marginalia

Minuscule 238 (in the Gregory-Aland numbering), A^{145} (Soden), is a Greek minuscule manuscript of the New Testament, on parchment. Palaeographically it has been assigned to the 11th or 12th century. It has marginalia.

== Description ==
The codex contains the text of the four Gospels, on 581 parchment leaves (size 31 cm by 22 cm), in two volumes (355 + 227) with lacunae. The text is written in one column per page, 24 lines per page.

The text is divided according to the Ammonian Sections, whose numbers are given at the margin, with references to the Eusebian Canons.

It contains tables of the κεφαλαια (tables of contents) before each Gospel, lectionary markings at the margin, and pictures. The biblical text is surrounded by a commentary (catena), Victor's in Mark. The biblical text is written in red, the text of a commentary in black ink.

== Text ==
The Greek text of the codex Aland did not place in any of his Categories. Wisse did not examine it by using his Profile Method.

== History ==
The manuscript in 1482 belonged to the monastery Great Lavra at Athos. Formerly the manuscript was held in the monastery Philotheus at Athos peninsula, then in Dionysius monastery. It was brought to Moscow, by the monk Arsenius, on the suggestion of the Patriarch Nikon, in the reign of Alexei Mikhailovich Romanov (1645-1676). The first part of the manuscript (Matt.-Mark) was collated by C. F. Matthaei. The second part (Luke-John) was sold by Matthaei to the library in Dresden. This part was examined by Tregelles and H. v. Gebhardt. It was held in Saxon State Library (A 100) until World War II. After the war it was brought to Moscow.

The Gospel of Matthew and Mark of the manuscript is currently housed at the State Historical Museum (V. 91, S. 47, 355 fol.) at Moscow, the Gospels of Luke and John in the State Archive (F. 1607, No. 3,226 fol.) in Moscow.

== See also ==
- List of New Testament minuscules
- Biblical manuscript
- Textual criticism
