= Minuscule 237 =

- New Testament manuscript
- Text: Gospels
- Date: 11th century
- Script: Greek
- Now at: State Historical Museum
- Size: 31 cm by 23.5 cm
- Type: Byzantine text-type
- Category: V

Minuscule 237 (in the Gregory-Aland numbering), A^{13} (Soden), is a Greek minuscule manuscript of the New Testament, on parchment. Palaeographically it has been assigned to the 11th century.

== Description ==
The codex contains the text of the four Gospels, on 289 parchment leaves (size 31 cm by 23.5 cm). The biblical text is surrounded by a commentary. A commentary to the Gospel of Mark is an authorship of Victorinus of Pettau. It contains pictures and scholia.

== Text ==
The Greek text of the codex is a representative of the Byzantine text-type. Aland placed it in Category V. It was not examined by the Claremont Profile Method.

The Pericope Adulterae (John 7:53-8:11) is placed after John 21:25.

== History ==
The manuscript was brought from the Athos (monastery Philotheus), by the monk Arsenius, on the suggestion of the Patriarch Nikon († 1681), in the reign of Alexei Mikhailovich Romanov (1645–1676). The manuscript was collated by C. F. Matthaei.

The manuscript is currently housed at the State Historical Museum (V. 85, S. 41) at Moscow.

== See also ==
- List of New Testament minuscules
- Biblical manuscript
- Textual criticism
