= Minuscule 243 =

- New Testament manuscript
- Text: Matthew, Luke
- Date: 14th century
- Script: Greek
- Now at: State Historical Museum
- Size: 26.4 cm by 17 cm
- Type: Byzantine text-type
- Category: V

Minuscule 243 (in the Gregory-Aland numbering), Θ^{ε304} (Soden), is a Greek minuscule manuscript of the New Testament, on paper. Palaeographically it has been assigned to the 14th century.

== Description ==
The codex contains the text of the Gospel of Matthew and Gospel of Luke on 224 paper leaves (size 26.4 cm by 17 cm). The text is written in one column per page, 31 lines per page. The evangelical text is surrounded by a commentary of Theophylact.

At the end of the manuscript it has extracts from Gregory of Nyssa.

== Text ==
The Greek text of the codex is a representative of the Byzantine text-type. Aland placed it in Category V. It was not examined by the Claremont Profile Method.

== History ==
Formerly the manuscript was held in the Iberian monastery at Athos peninsula. It was brought to Moscow, by the monk Arsenius, on the suggestion of the Patriarch Nikon, in the reign of Alexei Mikhailovich Romanov (1645–1676). The manuscript was collated by C. F. Matthaei.

The manuscript is currently housed at the State Historical Museum (V. 92, S. 388) at Moscow.

== See also ==
- List of New Testament minuscules
- Biblical manuscript
- Textual criticism
