= Minuscule 246 =

- New Testament manuscript
- Text: Gospels
- Date: 14th century
- Script: Greek
- Now at: State Historical Museum
- Size: 24.6 cm by 17.5 cm
- Type: Byzantine text-type
- Category: V
- Note: member of K^{r}

Minuscule 246 is a Greek minuscule manuscript of the New Testament, written on paper. It is designated by the siglum 246 in the Gregory-Aland numbering of New Testament manuscripts, and as ε 460 in the von Soden numbering of New Testament manuscripts. Using the study of comparative writing styles (palaeography), it has been assigned to the 14th century.

== Description ==
The manuscript is a codex (precursor to the modern book format), containing the complete text of the four Gospels written on 189 paper leaves (sized 24.6 cm by 17.5 cm), with two missing sections: Matthew 12:41-13:55, and John 17:24-18:20. The text is written in one column per page, with 26 lines per page.

It contains the tables of contents (known as κεφαλαια / kephalaia) before each Gospel, lectionary markings in the margin for liturgical use, and marginal notes recording various readings. A Synaxarion (list of Saint's Days) and Menologion (list of weekly readings) were added by a later hand.

== Text ==
The Greek text of the codex is considered to be a representative of the Byzantine text-type. Textual critic Hermann von Soden classified it to the textual family K^{r}. Biblical scholar Kurt Aland placed it in Category V of his New Testament manuscript classification system. Category V manuscripts are described as "manuscripts with a purely or predominantly Byzantine text."

According to the Claremont Profile Method (a specific analysis of textual data), it belongs to the textual family K^{r} in Luke 1 and Luke 20 as a perfect member. In Luke 10 no profile was made.

== History ==
The manuscript was formerly held at Mount Athos. It was brought to Moscow by the monk Arsenius, on the suggestion of the Patriarch Nikon during the reign of Alexei Mikhailovich Romanov (1645–1676). The manuscript was collated by Christian F. Matthaei. The manuscript is currently housed at the State Historical Museum (shelf number V. 19, S. 274) in Moscow.

== See also ==
- List of New Testament minuscules
- Biblical manuscript
- Textual criticism
