= Minuscule 226 =

- New Testament manuscript
- Name: Codex Escurialensis
- Text: NT (except Rev.)
- Date: 12th-century
- Script: Greek
- Now at: Escurial
- Size: 17.4 cm by 13.4 cm
- Type: Byzantine
- Category: V
- Hand: neatly written
- Note: unique readings marginalia

Minuscule 226 (in the Gregory-Aland numbering), δ 156 (Soden), is a Greek minuscule manuscript of the New Testament, on a parchment. Paleographically it has been assigned to the 12th century. It has marginalia.

== Description ==
The codex contains the entire of New Testament (except Book of Revelation), on 377 parchment leaves (size 17.4 cm by 13.4 cm). Catholic epistles placed before Pauline epistles. The leaves are arranged in octavo (eight leaves in quire). The text is written in one column per page, 26 lines per page, in neat minuscule letters. According to Emmanuel Miller, it is very elegantly written.

The text is divided according to the κεφαλαια (chapters), whose numbers are given at the margin, and their τιτλοι (titles of chapters) at the top of the pages. The text of the Gospels is also divided according to the smaller Ammonian Sections, with references to the Eusebian Canons (written below Ammonian Section numbers).

It contains the Eusebian Canon tables, tables of the κεφαλαια (tables of contents) before each book, and pictures. Many corrections were made by a later hand, but original text is valuable, with some unique readings.

== Text ==
The Greek text of the codex is a representative of the Byzantine text-type. Hermann von Soden placed it in textual family K^{x}. Kurt Aland placed it in Category V. According to the Claremont Profile Method it represents K^{x} in Luke 1, Luke 10, and Luke 20.

== History ==
The manuscript is dated by the INTF to the 12th century.

The manuscript was collated together with codices 227-233 by Moldenhawer, who made it about 1783 for Birch (Esc. 2). It was briefly described by Emmanuel Miller.

It is currently housed at the Library of the Monastery of El Escorial (Cod. Escurialensis, X. IV. 17).

== See also ==
- List of New Testament minuscules
- Biblical manuscript
- Textual criticism
- Minuscule 818
