= Minuscule 244 =

- New Testament manuscript
- Text: Gospels
- Date: 12th century
- Script: Greek
- Now at: State Historical Museum
- Size: 32 cm by 22.5 cm
- Type: Byzantine text-type
- Category: V

Minuscule 244 (in the Gregory-Aland numbering), ε 173 (Soden), is a Greek minuscule manuscript of the New Testament, on parchment. Paleographically it has been assigned to the 12th century.

== Description ==
The codex contains the text of the four Gospels on 274 parchment leaves (size 32 cm by 22.5 cm). The text is written in one column per page, 46 lines per page. The evangelical text is surrounded by a commentary of Euthymius Zigabenus. It contains pictures.

== Text ==
The Greek text of the codex is a representative of the Byzantine text-type. Aland placed it in Category V.

It was not examined by using the Claremont Profile Method.

== History ==
Formerly the manuscript was held at Athos peninsula. The manuscript was brought to Moscow, by the monk Arsenius, on the suggestion of the Patriarch Nikon, in the reign of Alexei Mikhailovich Romanov (1645–1676). The manuscript was collated by C. F. Matthaei.

The manuscript is currently housed at the State Historical Museum (V. 88, S. 220) at Moscow.

== See also ==
- List of New Testament minuscules
- Biblical manuscript
- Textual criticism
