= The Wrath Of The Seas =

1886 painting by Ivan Aivazovsky

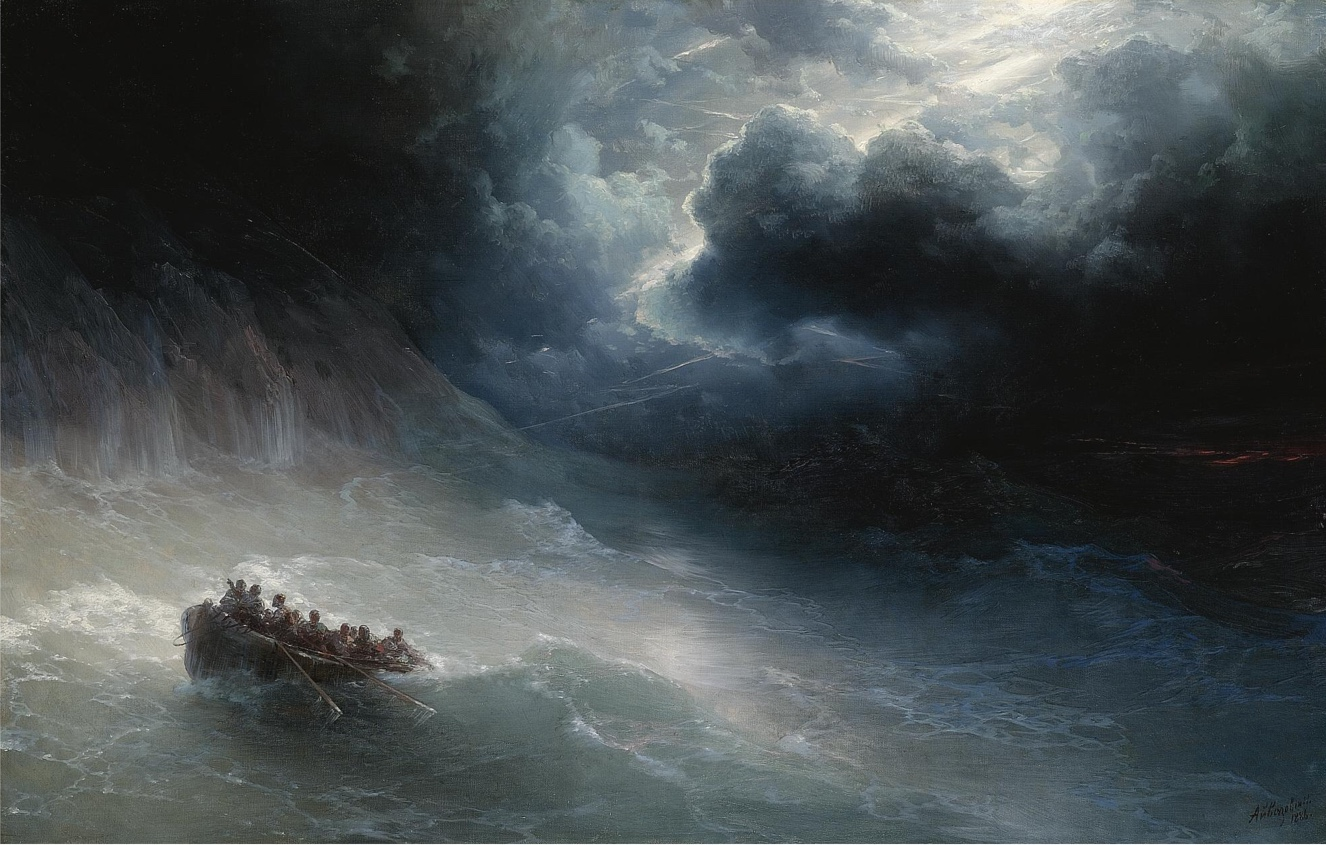
- Artist: Ivan Aivazovsky
- Year: 1886
- Medium: Oil-on-canvas
- Dimensions: 70.1 cm × 110 cm (27.6 in × 43 in)
- Owner: Private collection

The Wrath Of The Seas is an 1886 oil on canvas painting by Russian artist Ivan Aivazovsky. It measures 70.1 × 110 cm and is presently held in a private collection.

== Description ==
The painting portrays a powerful storm, depicting a raging sea merging with dark, stormy clouds. On the right, lightning strikes from behind heavy clouds, with waves splashing against the high coast and flowing down the rocks.

On the foreground's left side, a boat full of people can be seen trying to survive a shipwreck. One person is pointing his hand towards the coast while the others row the boat.

The painting is characterized by its dark, desaturated colors, with stark contrast between the heavy clouds and their light-toned edges. It is largely composed of grey, navy blue, and yellowish ochre tones.

Pieces of The Wrath Of The Seas.

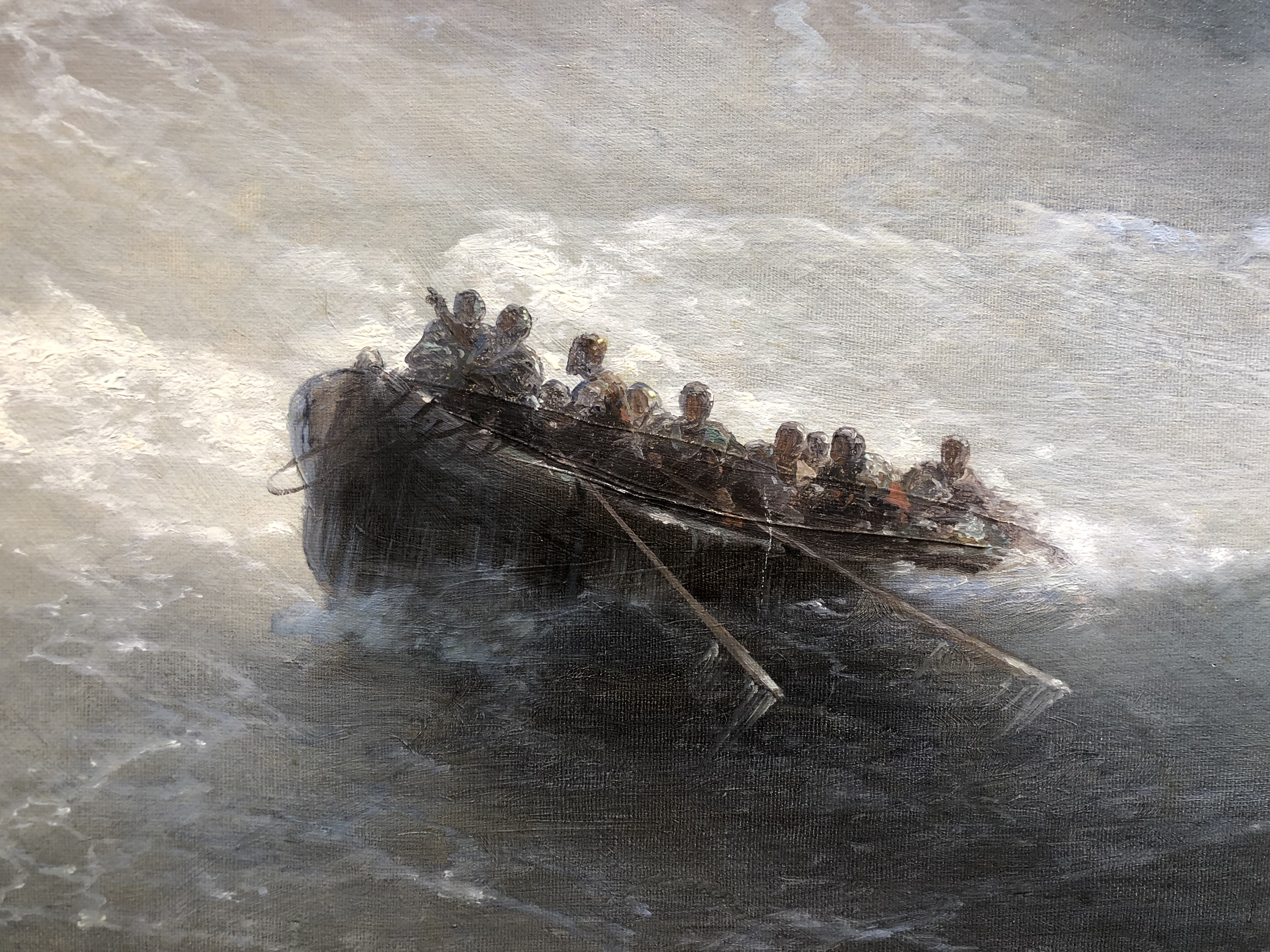
Boat with people

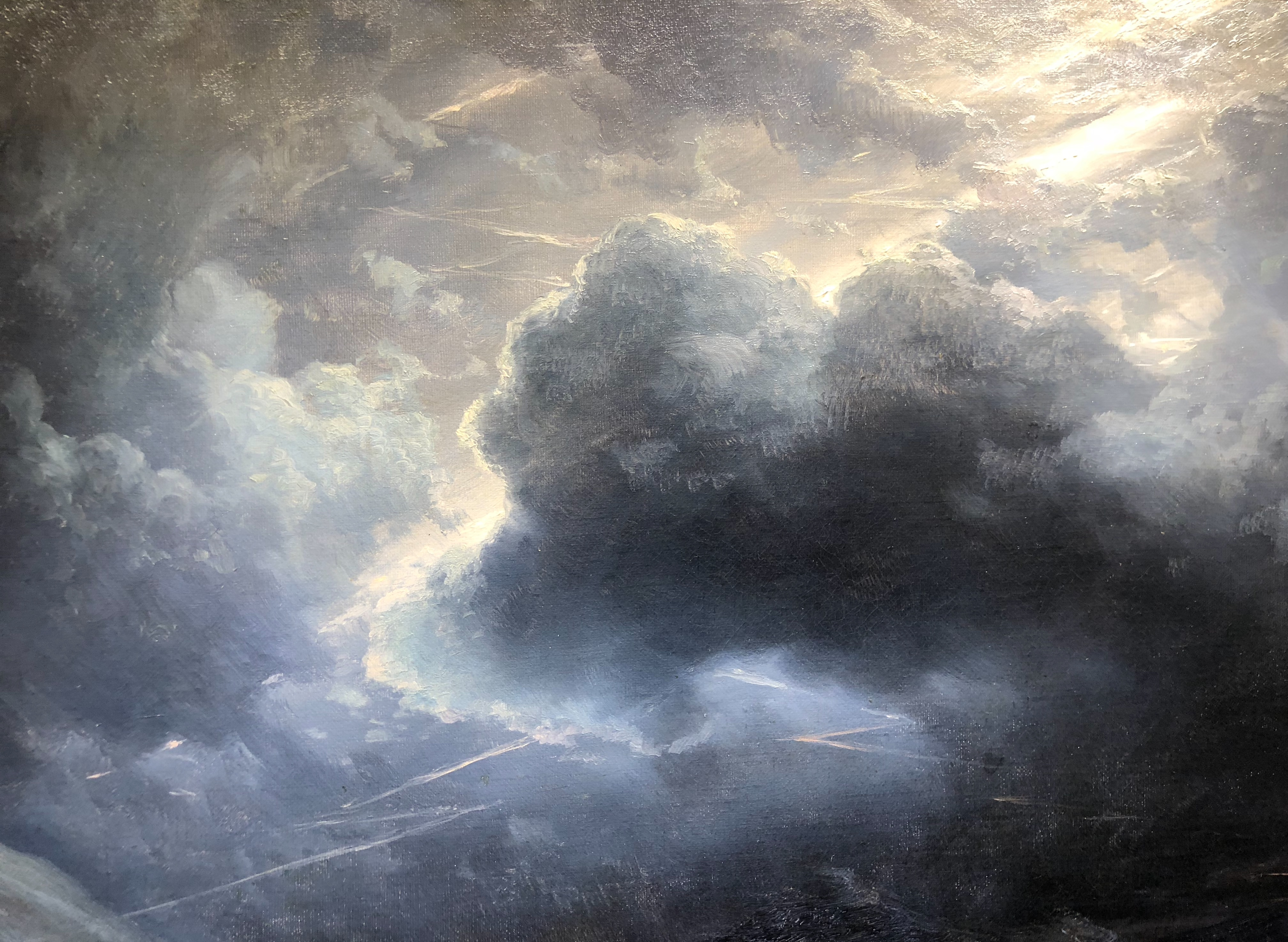
Clouds and lightning

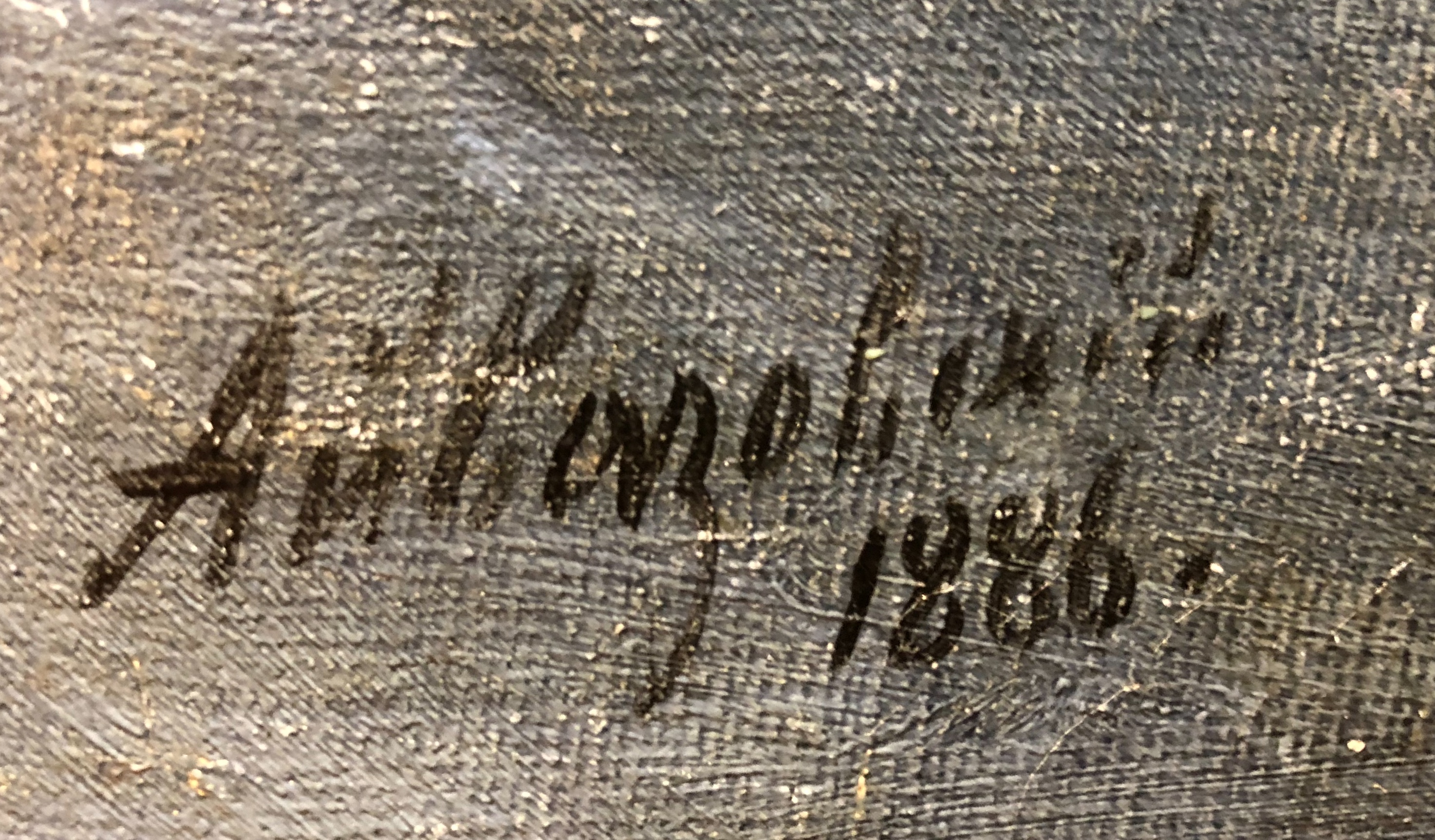
Signature on the front

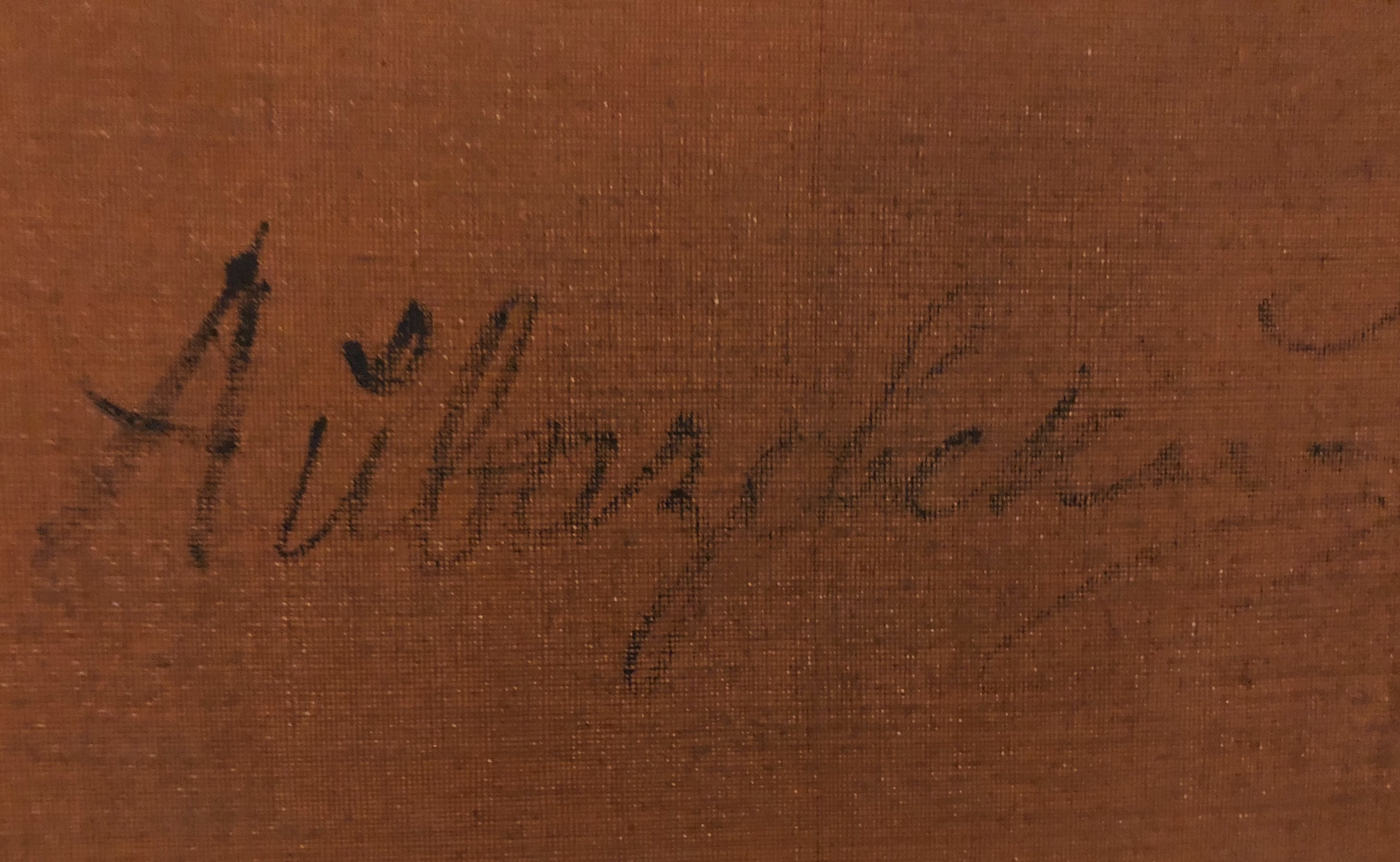
Signature on the back

The painting, which depicts the sky and sea merging into one with flashes of lightning on the water, is reminiscent of works by British painter William Turner, another romanticist marine art painter.

W. Turner’s works.

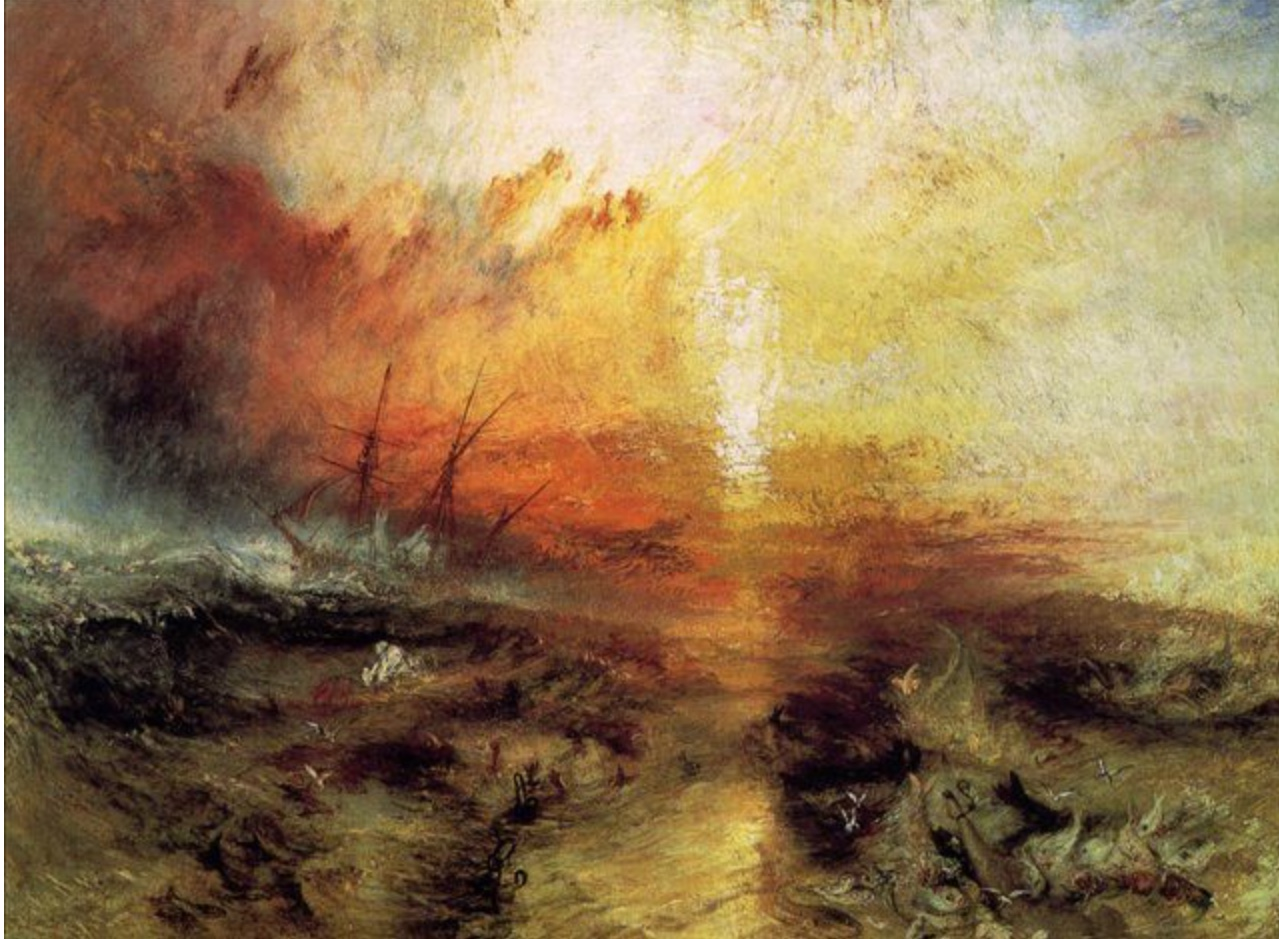
Slavers Throwing Overboard the Dead and Dying, Typhoon Coming On. 1840

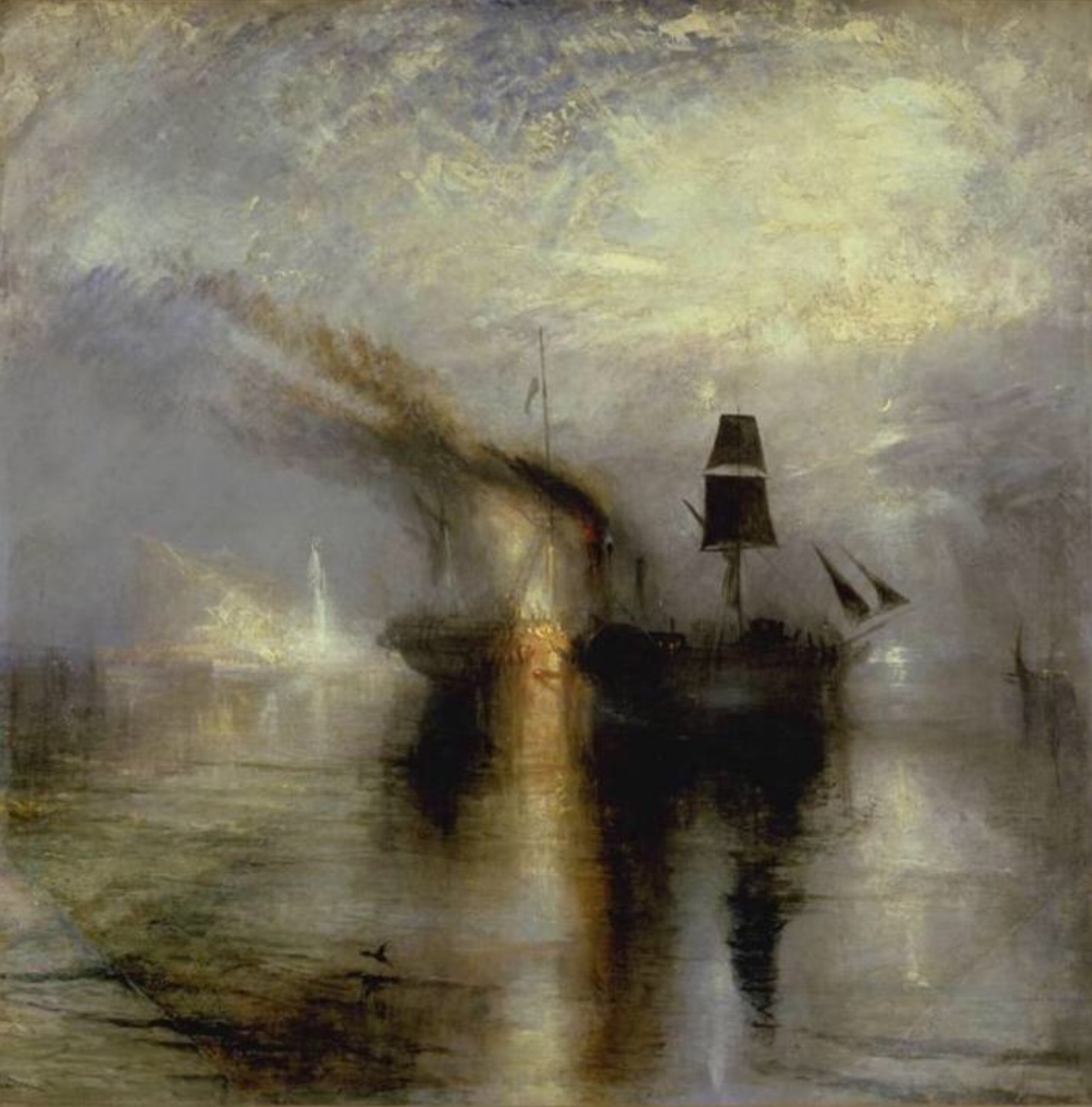
Peace – Burial at Sea 1842

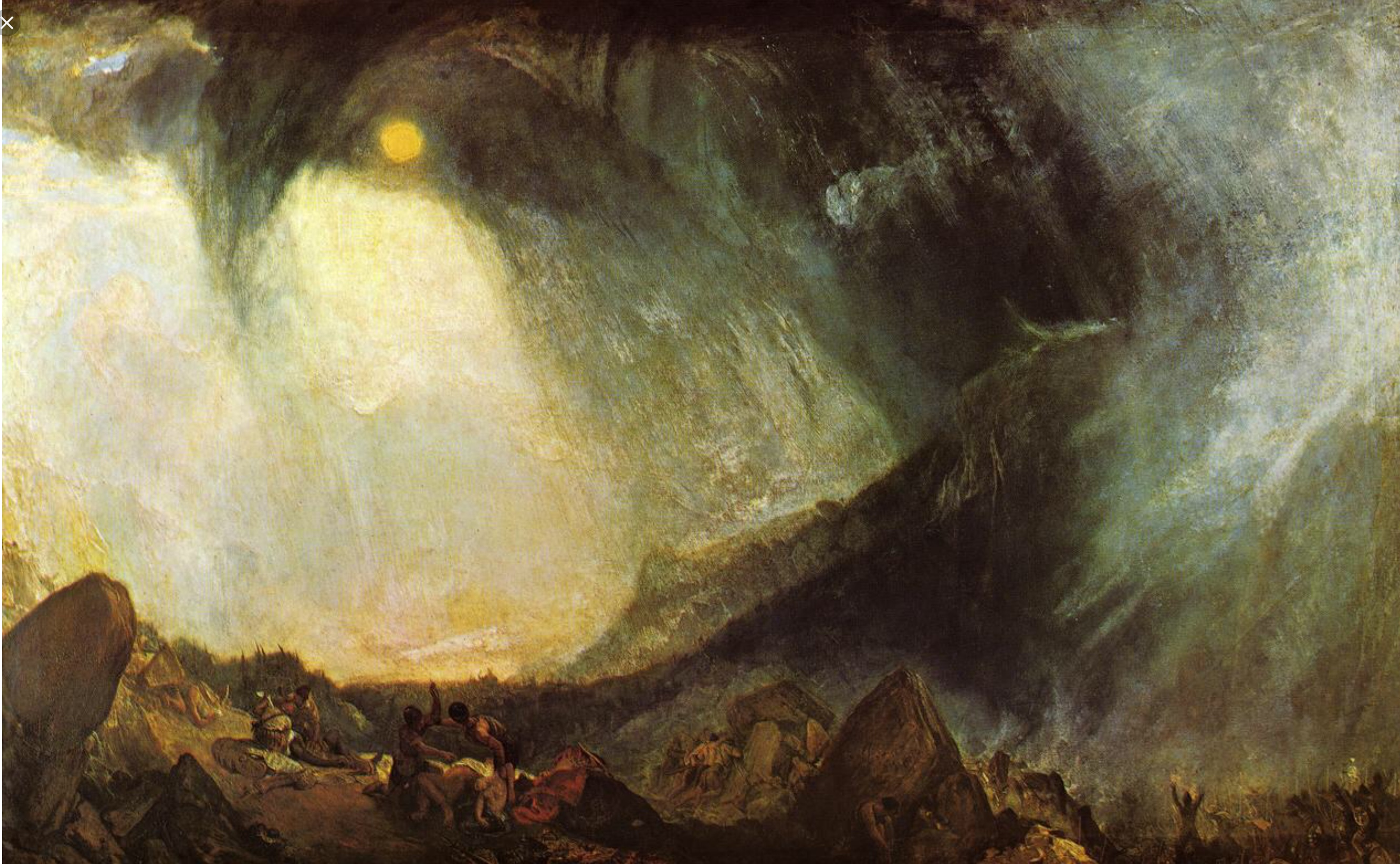
Hannibal and his Army Crossing the Alps. 1812

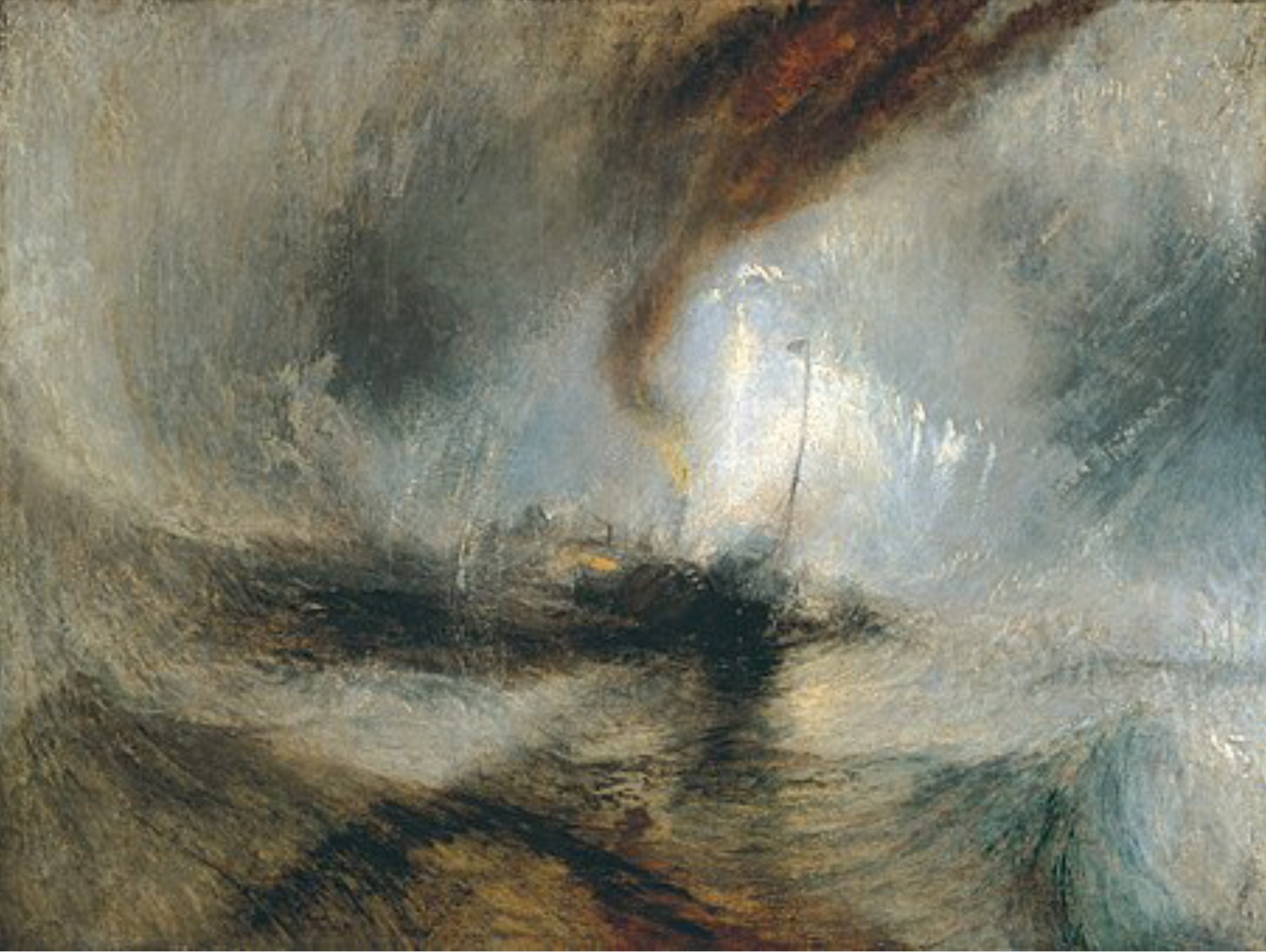
Snow Storm – Steam-Boat off a Harbour’s Mouth.1842

Fyodor Dostoevsky about Aivazovsky's Storm over Yevpatoria: “His storm has a thrill, a perpetual beauty that strikes the spectator as he is thinking of a live real storm” and more: "when portraying the endless diversity of the storm, nothing can appear exaggerated". These words are totally true for The Wrath Of The Seas as well, despite the fact that it was created 25 years after Fyodor Dostoevsky's article was published (1861).

The painting has two signatures of the author, which is quite common for Ivan Aivazovsky. One of them is on the front next to the lower right corner and is made in black paint: “Aivazovsky 1886”. The paint of the signature has the same crack patterns as the underlayer. The second author's signature is on the back of the painting at its upper right and is made with brown paint: “Aivazovsky”.

The work is in excellent shape.

== Peculiarities of painterly manner ==
As he was creating the painting, the artist used a complex painting technique, including a preliminary drawing with an undercoat graphite pencil, a few paint coats of various textures and directions, scumble, and overtone, strokes of various shape, thickness, and length, and diverse textured compactions.

The painting was made in several stages. The principal outline is made in large strokes of medium thickness. Then finer details are portrayed over the layer slightly touched by fading. The bright cloud edges are painted with bristly brushes in short strokes that depict their round shapes. The concluding outlines (webby sections of the foam dissolving in the waves, water flowing from the rocks, etc.) are painted in translucent bleach scumbles. The foam of the waves is depicted with fine floating zigzags that oftentimes thicken into diverse bunches (on brighter surfaces). The human figures in gliding blue, emerald green, red, and ochre strokes are portrayed in a generalised manner depicting a common zeal for survival.

== Technology ==
The work is made on a thin rare medium-grained canvas with a light factory undercoat and is put on a key stretcher. The painter equally used this type of canvas for many other works.

The painting microsampling by means of infrared spectroscopy, microchemical, emission, phosphorescent and thermochemical types of analysis established that the colour combination of the painting is most typical for Ivan Aivazovsky's works. The piece bears no marks of the paints that were not used or were rarely used by the painter

== Provenance ==
Painting from a well-known princely collection, Germany. In 2007, the owner who purchased the painting back in the 1940s from the private collection mentioned above put it under the Sotheby's hammer in London.

It was exposed at the exhibition of Russian fine art masterpieces in the State Historical Museum of Russia that opened on 8 November 2007

The experts characterised the painting as an outstanding masterpiece referred to as among the best lots in the auction. Specifically, Joanna Vickery, director of the Russian section at Sotheby's, said: "The Wrath Of The Seas deserves special attention: the painter did a great job depicting the outrage of nature with so much emotion and expression".

At the Russian evening sale of Sotheby's London division held for the first time in history on 26 November 2007 The Wrath Of The Seas (Lot No. 12) was sold for £513,300, which is equivalent to over $1,000,000 (net of the auction and other fees).

Currently, the painting is kept in a private collection.
