= Minuscule 818 =

- New Testament manuscript
- Name: Escurialensis
- Text: Gospels
- Date: 14th century
- Script: Greek
- Now at: El Escorial
- Size: 23.7 cm by 16 cm
- Type: Byzantine text-type
- Category: V
- Note: –

Minuscule 818 (in the Gregory-Aland numbering), Θ^{ε419} (von Soden), is a 14th-century Greek minuscule manuscript of the New Testament written on paper, with a commentary.

== Description ==
The codex contains the complete text of the four Gospels, on 373 cotton paper leaves (size 23.7 cm by 16 cm), with a commentary. The leaves are arranged in quarto (four leaves in quire). It has ornamented headpieces.

The text is written in one column per page, 32 lines per page.

It contains a commentary of Theophylact.

== Text ==
The Greek text of the codex is a representative of the Byzantine text-type. Aland placed it in Category V.

It was not examined according to the Claremont Profile Method.

== History ==
Emmanuel Miller and C. R. Gregory dated the manuscript to the 14th century. It is presently assigned to the 14th century on palaeographic grounds by the Institute for New Testament Textual Research.

The manuscript was briefly described by Emmanuel Miller in 1848. It was added to the list of New Testament manuscripts by Gregory (818^{e}).

The manuscript is now housed in El Escorial (Ψ. III, 13).

== See also ==
- List of New Testament minuscules
- Biblical manuscript
- Textual criticism
- Minuscule 226
