= Minuscule 231 =

- New Testament manuscript
- Name: Codex Escurialensis
- Text: Gospels
- Date: 12th century
- Script: Greek
- Now at: Escurial
- Size: 21.5 cm by 15.5 cm
- Type: Byzantine text-type
- Category: V

Minuscule 231 (in the Gregory-Aland numbering), ε 1207 (Soden), is a Greek minuscule manuscript of the New Testament, on parchment. Paleographically it has been assigned to the 12th century.

== Description ==
The codex contains a complete text of the four Gospels, on 181 parchment leaves (size 21.5 cm by 15.5 cm). The leaves are arranged in quarto (four leaves in quire). The text is written in one column per page, 29 lines per page.

It contains the Eusebian tables, tables of the κεφαλαια (tables of contents) before each Gospel, lectionary markings at the margin, synaxaria, Menologion, subscriptions at the end of each Gospel, with numbers of στιχοι.

There are some marginal glosses made by a later hand, and a Latin version of parts of Matthew (between lines of Greek text). The text of the Pericope Adulterae (John 7:53-8:11) was marked by an obelus by a later hand.

== Text ==
The Greek text of the codex is a representative of the Byzantine text-type. Hermann von Soden classified it to the textual family K^{x}. Aland placed it in Category V.

According to the Claremont Profile Method it represents textual family K^{x} in Luke 1, Luke 10, and Luke 20.

== History ==
The manuscript was described by Daniel Gotthilf Moldenhawer, who collated it about 1783 for Andreas Birch (Esc. 10). It was briefly described by Emmanuel Miller in 1848.

It is currently housed at the Escurial (Cod. Escurialensis, y. III. 6).

== See also ==
- List of New Testament minuscules
- Biblical manuscript
- Textual criticism
