= Minuscule 228 =

- New Testament manuscript
- Name: Codex Escurialensis
- Text: Acts, Paul
- Date: 14th century
- Script: Greek
- Now at: Escurial
- Size: 16.8 cm by 12.5 cm
- Category: none

Minuscule 228 (in the Gregory-Aland numbering), δ 458 (Soden), is a Greek minuscule manuscript of the New Testament, on parchment. Palaeographically it has been assigned to the 14th century. Formerly it was labelled by 109^{a} and 229^{p}.

== Description ==
The codex contains the text of the Acts of the Apostles and Pauline epistles (except Philemon, Hebrews), on 126 parchment leaves (size 16.8 cm by 12.5 cm). It is written in one column per page, 40-44 lines per page. It has not Catholic epistles.

== Text ==
Hermann von Soden classified it to the textual family K^{x}. Aland did not place it in any of his Categories.

According to the Claremont Profile Method it represents the textual family Π171 in Luke 1 and Luke 10. In Luke 20 it represents K^{x}.

It does not contain the Pericope Adulterae (John 7:53-8:11).

== History ==
The manuscript belonged to Nicholas Nathanael of Crete, then to Andreas Darmarius, a calligrapher from Epidaurus. Daniel Gotthilf Moldenhawer collated it for Andreas Birch (Esc. 7). Formerly the manuscript was labelled by 109^{a} and 229^{p}. In 1908 C. R. Gregory gave the number 228 to it.

It is currently housed at the Escurial (Cod. Escurialensis, X. IV. 12).

== See also ==
- List of New Testament minuscules
- Biblical manuscript
- Textual criticism
