= Minuscule 247 =

- New Testament manuscript
- Text: Gospels
- Date: 12th century
- Script: Greek
- Now at: State Historical Museum
- Size: 15.5 cm by 12 cm
- Type: Byzantine text-type
- Category: V
- Note: marginalia

Minuscule 247 (in the Gregory-Aland numbering), ε 1192 (Soden), is a Greek minuscule manuscript of the New Testament, on parchment. Palaeographically it has been assigned to the 12th century. It has marginalia.

== Description ==
The codex contains a complete text of the four Gospels on 223 parchment leaves (size 15.5 cm by 12 cm). The text is written in one column per page, 26 lines per page.

The text is divided according to the κεφαλαια (chapters), whose numbers are given at the margin. There is also a division according to the Ammonian Sections, with references to the Eusebian Canons (written below Ammonian Section numbers).

It contains the tables of the κεφαλαια (tables of contents) before each Gospel, Prolegomena, lectionary markings at the margin (for liturgical use), Synaxarion, and Menologion.

== Text ==
The Greek text of the codex is a representative of the Byzantine text-type. Hermann von Soden classified it to the textual family K^{x}. Aland placed it in Category V.

According to the Claremont Profile Method it represents textual family K^{x} in Luke 1, Luke 10, and Luke 20. It belongs to the cluster 1193.

It contains remarkable readings.

== History ==
Formerly the manuscript was held at the Philotheou monastery at Athos peninsula. It was brought to Moscow, by the monk Arsenius, on the suggestion of the Patriarch Nikon, in the reign of Alexei Mikhailovich Romanov (1645-1676). The manuscript was collated by C. F. Matthaei.

The manuscript is currently housed at the State Historical Museum (V. 17, S. 400) at Moscow.

== See also ==
- List of New Testament minuscules
- Biblical manuscript
- Textual criticism
