= Minuscule 239 =

- New Testament manuscript
- Text: Gospels †
- Date: 11th century
- Script: Greek
- Now at: State Historical Museum
- Size: 32.5 cm by 25.5 cm
- Category: none

Minuscule 239 (in the Gregory-Aland numbering), A^{147} (Soden), is a Greek minuscule manuscript of the New Testament, on parchment. Palaeographically, it has been assigned to the 11th century.

== Description ==
The codex contains the text of the Mark 16:2-8; Luke 1:1-53; 1:70-24:53; John 1:1-16:23 on 277 parchment leaves (size 32.5 cm by 25.5 cm). It contains the Eusebian Canon tables at the beginning, tables of the κεφαλαια (tables of contents) are placed before Luke and John, and scholia. The biblical text is surrounded by a commentary (catena).

== Text ==
Kurt Aland did not place the Greek text of the codex in any Category. It was not examined by the Claremont Profile Method.

== History ==
The manuscript belonged to the monastery Pantocrator at Athos peninsula. It was brought to Moscow, by the monk Arsenius, on the suggestion of the Patriarch Nikon, in the reign of Alexei Mikhailovich Romanov (1645–1676). The manuscript was collated by C. F. Matthaei.

The manuscript is currently housed at the State Historical Museum (V. 84, S. 46) at Moscow.

== See also ==
- List of New Testament minuscules
- Biblical manuscript
- Textual criticism
