= Minuscule 253 =

- New Testament manuscript
- Text: Gospels
- Date: 11th century
- Script: Greek
- Now at: Russian State Library
- Size: 22 cm by 17.5 cm
- Category: none
- Note: marginalia

Minuscule 253 (in the Gregory-Aland numbering), A^{123} (Soden), is a Greek minuscule manuscript of the New Testament, on parchment. Paleographically it has been assigned to the 11th century. It has marginalia.

== Description ==
The codex contains the text of the four Gospels on 248 parchment leaves (22 cm by 17.5 cm), with lacunae (Matthew 1:1-8). The text of Matthew 1:1-8 was supplied by a later hand. The text is written in 1 column per page, 27-30 lines per page.

The text is divided according to the Ammonian Sections, whose numbers are given at the margin, with references to the Eusebian Canons (written below Ammonian Section numbers).

It contains Prolegomena, tables of the κεφαλαια (tables of contents) before each Gospel, and scholia. The biblical text is surrounded by a commentary (catena, Victor's in Mark). It has some rare readings.

Kurt Aland the Greek text of the codex did not place in any Category. It was not examined by the Claremont Profile Method.

== History ==
Formerly the manuscript was held at the monastery of St. Michael, at Jerusalem. It belonged to Nicephours archbishop of Chesron and Slabinium. It was brought to Moscow, by the monk Arsenius, on the suggestion of the Patriarch Nikon, in the reign of Alexei Mikhailovich Romanov (1645-1676). The manuscript was collated by C. F. Matthaei. It was examined by Matthaei and Treu.

Formerly the manuscript was housed at the Russian State Library at Moscow.

Archbishop Nicephorus lost this manuscript.

== See also ==
- List of New Testament minuscules
- Biblical manuscript
- Textual criticism
