= Minuscule 296 =

- New Testament manuscript
- Text: New Testament
- Date: 16th century
- Script: Greek
- Now at: Bibliothèque nationale de France
- Size: 12.4 cm by 8.8 cm
- Type: Textus Receptus
- Category: none
- Hand: beautifully written

Minuscule 296 (in the Gregory-Aland numbering), δ 600 (Soden), is a Greek minuscule manuscript of the New Testament, on parchment. Palaeographically it has been assigned to the 16th century.

== Description ==
The codex contains the entire text of the New Testament on 560 parchment leaves (12.4 cm by 8.8 cm) in two volumes (257 + 303 leaves). The text is written in one column per page, in 20 lines per page.

The Greek text of the codex Kurt Aland did not place in any Category. It was not examined by the Claremont Profile Method.

== History ==
The manuscript was written by calligrapher Angelus Vergecius, from whose skill arose the expression "he writes like an angel". Probably it was rewritten from printed text of the Greek New Testament. The manuscript was added to the list of New Testament manuscripts by Scholz (1794–1852). It was examined and described by Paulin Martin. C. R. Gregory saw it in 1885.

The manuscript is currently housed at the Bibliothèque nationale de France (Gr. 123.124) at Paris.

== See also ==
- List of New Testament minuscules
- Biblical manuscript
- Textual criticism
