= Minuscule 292 =

- New Testament manuscript
- Text: Gospels †
- Date: 12th/13th century
- Script: Greek
- Now at: Bibliothèque nationale de France
- Size: 18.5 cm by 11.2 cm
- Type: Byzantine text-type
- Category: V
- Note: full marginalia

Minuscule 292 (in the Gregory-Aland numbering), ε 378 (Soden), is a Greek minuscule manuscript of the New Testament, on parchment. Palaeographically it has been assigned to the 12th or 13th century. It has full marginalia.

== Description ==
The codex contains a complete text of the four Gospels on 290 parchment leaves (18.5 cm by 11.2 cm), with lacunae (Matt 1:1-7:13; John 19:5-21:25). The text is written in one column per page, in 19-22 lines per page. It was written by several different hands.

The text is divided according to the κεφαλαια (chapters), whose numbers are given at the margin, and their τιτλοι (titles of chapters) at the top of the pages. There is also a division according to the Ammonian Sections (in Mark 241 Sections, the last in 16:20), with references to the Eusebian Canons (written below Ammonian Section numbers).

It contains lectionary markings at the margin for liturgical reading, Synaxarion (later hand), and pictures.

== Text ==
The Greek text of the codex is a representative of the Byzantine text-type. According to Hermann von Soden it is related to the Byzantine commentated text. Aland placed it in Category V. According to the Claremont Profile Method it belongs to the textual family K^{x} in Luke 1. In Luke 10 and Luke 20 it represents the textual cluster Π473.

It is close to the codex 53.

== History ==
The manuscript was added to the list of New Testament manuscripts by Scholz (1794-1852). It was examined by Wettstein and Griesbach. It was examined and described by Paulin Martin. C. R. Gregory saw it in 1885.

The manuscript is currently housed at the Bibliothèque nationale de France (Gr. 114) at Paris.

== See also ==
- List of New Testament minuscules
- Biblical manuscript
- Textual criticism
