= Minuscule 295 =

- New Testament manuscript
- Text: Gospels
- Date: 13th century
- Script: Greek
- Now at: Bibliothèque nationale de France
- Size: 11.5 cm by 7.1 cm
- Type: Byzantine text-type
- Category: none
- Note: marginalia

Minuscule 295 (in the Gregory-Aland numbering), ε 379 (Soden), is a Greek minuscule manuscript of the New Testament, on parchment. Paleographically it has been assigned to the 13th century. It has marginalia.

== Description ==
The codex contains a complete text of the four Gospels on 239 parchment leaves (11.5 cm by 7.1 cm), with only one lacuna (Matthew 1:1-12). Matthew 1:1-12 was added by a later hand in 16th or 17th century.

The text is written in one column per page, in 24-25 lines per page.

It contains tables of the κεφαλαια (tables of contents) before each Gospel, numbers of the κεφαλαια (chapters) at the margin of the text, and the τιτλοι (titles of chapters) at the top of the pages.

== Text ==
The Greek text of the codex is a representative of the Byzantine text-type. Aland did not place it in any Category.

According to the Claremont Profile Method it represents Π1441 in Luke 1 and Luke 20. In Luke 10 no profile was made.

== History ==
The manuscript was added to the list of New Testament manuscripts by Scholz (1794-1852). It was examined and described by Paulin Martin. C. R. Gregory saw it in 1885.

The manuscript is currently housed at the Bibliothèque nationale de France (Gr. 120) at Paris.

== See also ==
- List of New Testament minuscules
- Biblical manuscript
- Textual criticism
