= Minuscule 250 =

- New Testament manuscript
- Text: New Testament (except Gospels)
- Date: 11th century
- Script: Greek
- Now at: Bibliothèque nationale de France
- Size: 25.5 cm by 21 cm
- Type: Byzantine text-type
- Category: V

Minuscule 250 (in the Gregory-Aland numbering), O ^{10} (Soden), is a Greek minuscule manuscript of the New Testament, on parchment. Paleographically it has been assigned to the 11th century.

Scrivener labelled it by 264^{a}, 337^{p}. Gregory labelled it by 250^{a}, 299^{p}, and 121^{r}.

== Description ==
The codex contains the text of the Book of Acts, the Catholic epistles, the Pauline Epistles, and the Book of Revelation on 379 parchment leaves (25.5 cm by 21 cm).

The biblical text is surrounded by a catena. The biblical text is written in one column per page and 20 lines in column, the text of commentary has 41 lines.

The Epistle to the Hebrews is placed after Epistle to Philemon.

It contains Synaxarion and the Euthalian Apparatus.

== Text ==
The Greek text of the codex is a representative of the Byzantine text-type. Aland placed it in Category V.

== History ==
The manuscript was brought from Greece.

It was examined by Bernard de Montfaucon, Matthaei, Paulin Martin, Franz Delitzsch, and Herman C. Hoskier (only Apocalypse).

The manuscript is currently housed at the Bibliothèque nationale de France (Coislin Gr. 224) in Paris.

== See also ==
- Minuscule 251
- Minuscule 249
- List of New Testament minuscules
- Biblical manuscript
- Textual criticism
