= Minuscule 233 =

- New Testament manuscript
- Name: Codex Escurialensis
- Text: Gospels †
- Date: 13th century
- Script: Greek
- Now at: Escurial
- Size: 26.7 cm by 20 cm
- Category: none
- Note: paper in bad condition

Minuscule 233 (in the Gregory-Aland numbering), ε 173 (Soden), is a Greek minuscule manuscript of the New Testament, on parchment and paper. Paleographically it has been assigned to the 13th century.

== Description ==
The codex contains the text of the four Gospels, on 279 parchment leaves (size 26.7 cm by 20 cm), with some lacunae. It is written partly on parchment, partly on paper, in two columns per page, 37 lines per page. The leaves are arranged in octavo. It has some additional material (life of saints).

It contains a commentary, in catena quotations of Church Fathers, Prolegomena to the four Gospels, the Eusebian tables, tables of the κεφαλαια (tables of contents) before each Gospel, numbers of ρηματα, and numbers of στιχοι to the first two Gospels. It has ligatures. The paper has survived in bad condition. It is hard to read.

== Text ==
Kurt Aland the Greek text of the codex did not place in any Category. It was not examined by the Claremont Profile Method.

== History ==
The manuscript once belonged to Matthew Dandolo, a Venetian noble.

It was described by Daniel Gotthilf Moldenhawer, who collated it about 1783 for Andreas Birch (Esc. 12).

It is currently housed at the Escurial (Cod. Escurialensis, Y. II. 8).

== See also ==
- List of New Testament minuscules
- Biblical manuscript
- Textual criticism
