= Escurial =

Coordinates: 40°37′00″N 5°57′19″W

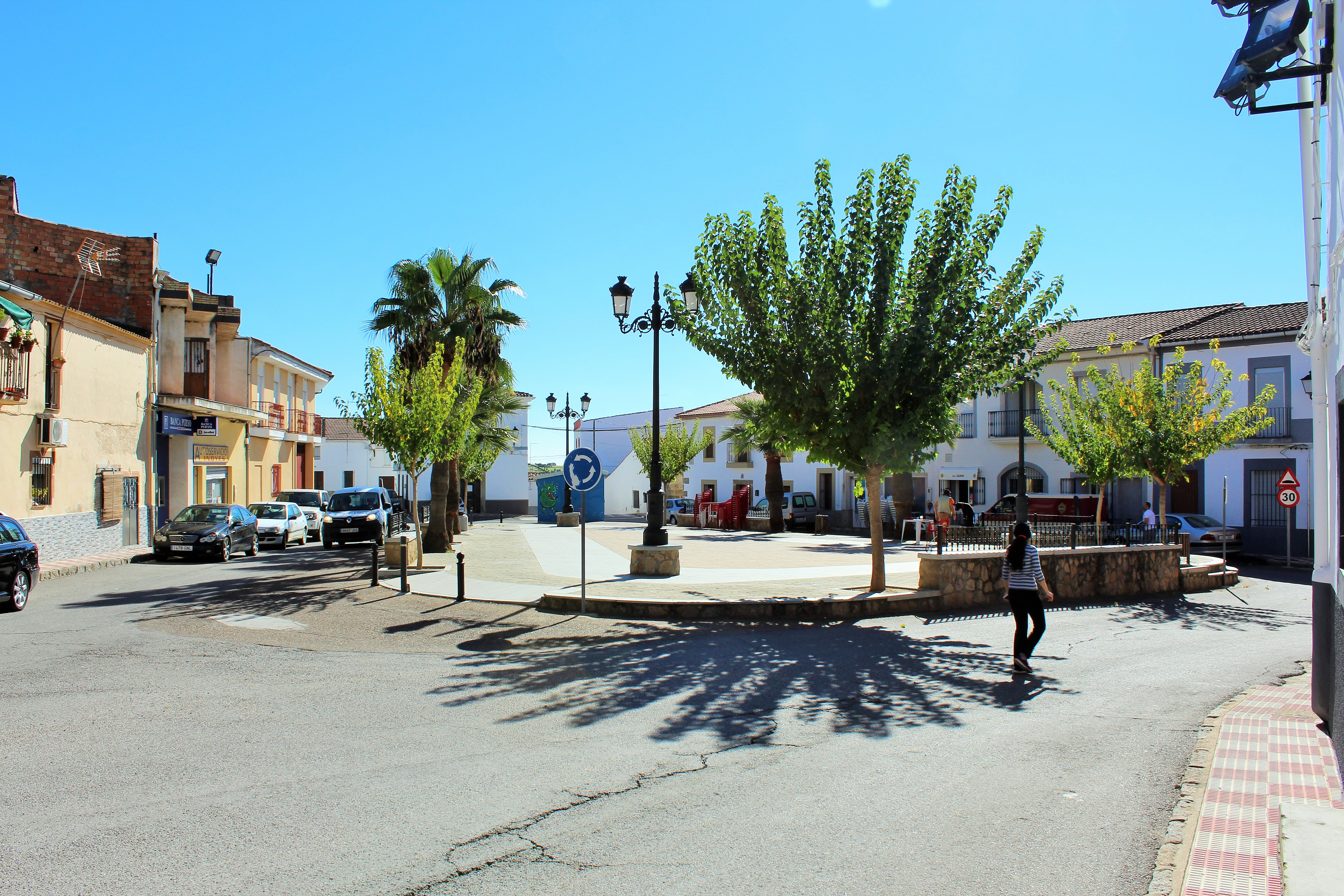
- Escurial main square

- Flag Coat of arms

- Location in Spain.
- Country: Spain
- Autonomous community: Cáceres

Area
  - Total: 100.71 km^{2} (38.88 sq mi)
- Elevation: 293 m (961 ft)

Population (2025-01-01)
  - Total: 855
  - Density: 8.49/km^{2} (22.0/sq mi)
- Time zone: UTC+1 (CET)
  - Summer (DST): UTC+2 (CEST)
- Website: www.escurial.es

Escurial is a municipality located in the province of Cáceres, Extremadura, Spain.

== See also ==
- List of municipalities in Cáceres
