= State Historical Museum =

National museum in Moscow, Russia

- Государственный исторический музей
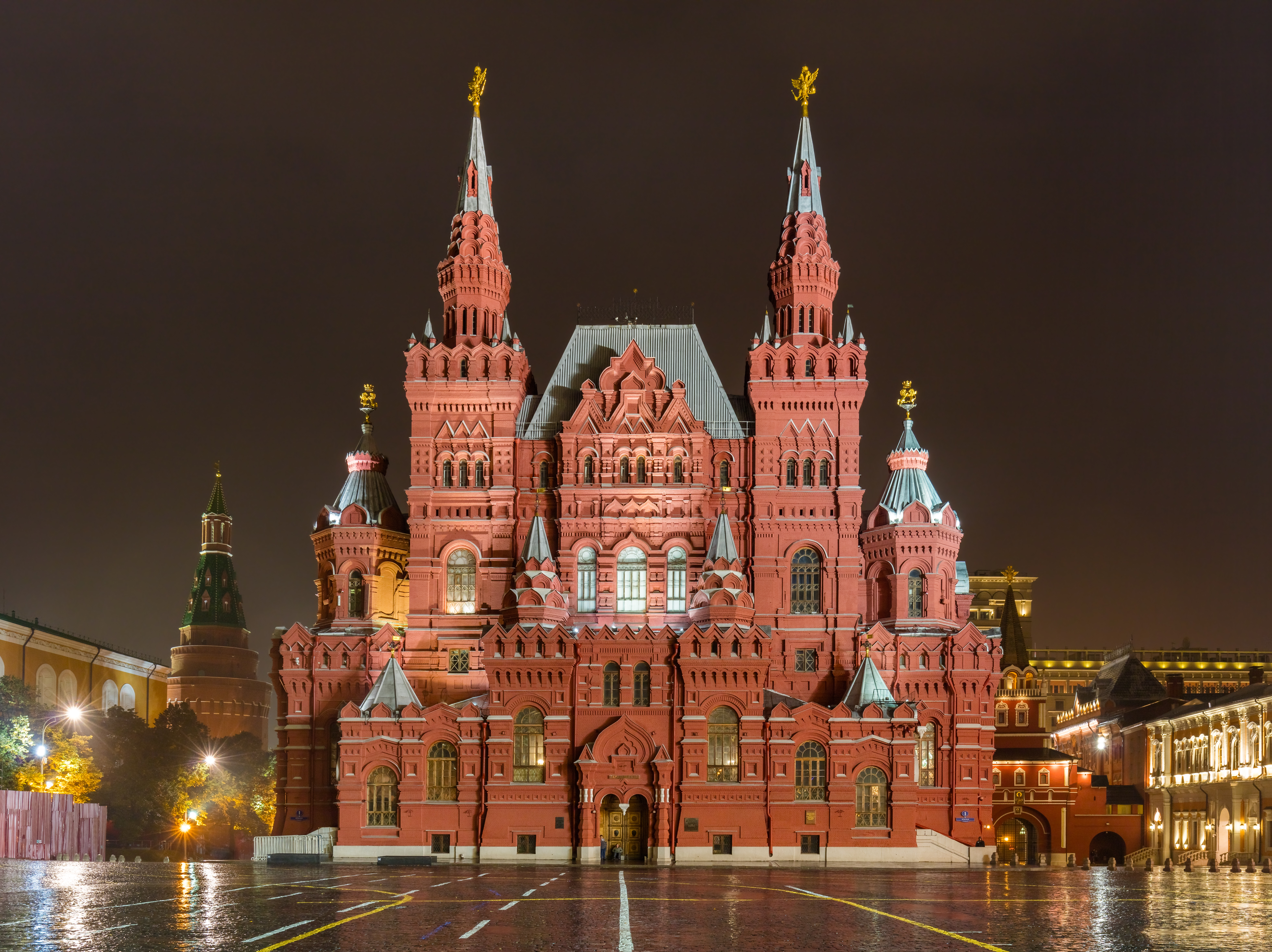
- State Historical Museum, as seen from the Red Square.
- Interactive fullscreen map
- Established: 1872; 154 years ago
- Location: Moscow, Russia
- Coordinates: 55°45′18″N 37°37′05″E
- Type: Historical
- Website: shm.ru

The State Historical Museum (Russian: Государственный исторический музей, ГИМ, romanized: Gosudarstvennyy istoricheskiy muzey, GIM) of Russia is a museum of Russian history located between Red Square and Manege Square in Moscow. The museum's exhibitions range from relics of prehistoric tribes that lived in the territory of present-day Russia, to priceless artworks acquired by members of the Romanov dynasty. The total number of objects in the museum's collection numbers in the millions.

== Description ==
The place where the museum now stands was formerly occupied by the Principal Medicine Store, built by order of Peter the Great in the Moscow Baroque style.

The museum was founded in 1872 by Ivan Zabelin, Aleksey Uvarov and several other Slavophiles interested in promoting Russian history and national self-awareness. The board of trustees, composed of Sergey Solovyov, Vasily Klyuchevsky, Uvarov, and other leading historians, presided over the construction of the museum building. After a prolonged competition, the project was handed over to Vladimir Osipovich Shervud (or Sherwood, 1833–97).

The present structure was built based on Sherwood's neo-Russian design between 1875 and 1881. The first 11 exhibit halls officially opened in 1883 during a visit from the tsar and his wife. Then in 1894, Tsar Alexander III became the honorary president of the museum and the following year, 1895, the museum was renamed the Tsar Alexander III Imperial Russian History Museum. Its interiors were intricately decorated in the Russian Revival style by such artists as Viktor Vasnetsov, Henryk Siemiradzki, and Ivan Aivazovsky. During the Soviet period, the murals were proclaimed gaudy and were plastered over.

== Current activities ==
Since spring 2007, for the first time in the history of The State Historical Museum, all 40 halls have been open to the public. The museum covers the period from ancient times to the early 20th century and over 1.2 million people visit its exhibitions. The museum is also a major centre for research, science and education. The department's host lectures and seminars, internships, and awards in research and restoration activities.

Since the end of 2016, it has been possible to view the exhibition through a virtual tour, which is accessible on the museum's official website.

About 30-40 exhibition projects are held annually based on exhibits from the museum's collection throughout Russia. For the 500th anniversary of the Novodevichy Convent, the museum plans to open an exhibition dedicated to the Russian Orthodox Church. For 2018–2023, a series of exhibitions of the project "National Museums of the World to the Historical Museum" is planned, in which European museums will take part.

From March to July 2020, the museum was closed to the public due to quarantine amid the COVID-19 pandemic.

== Gallery ==
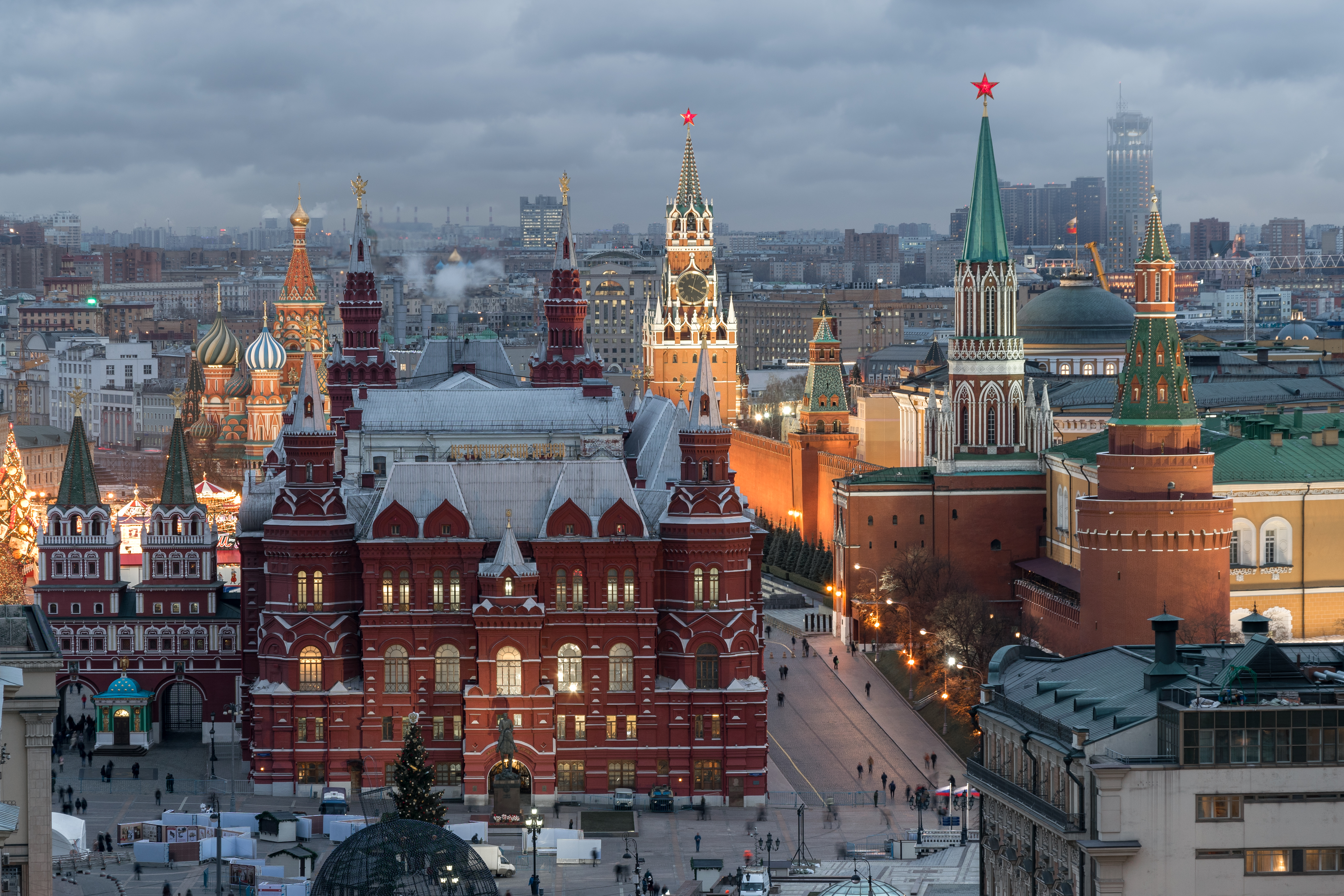
Night View

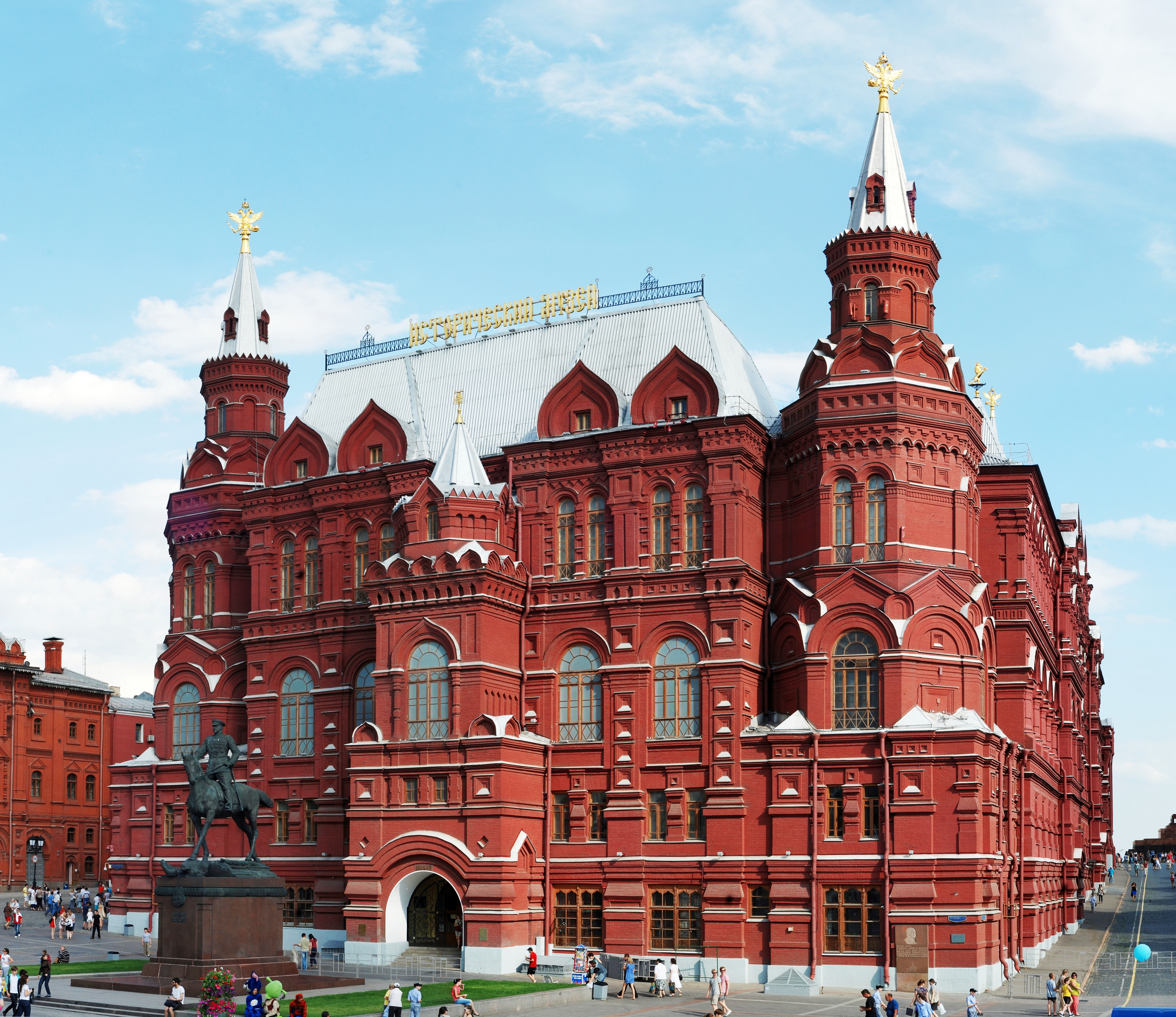
View from the northwest

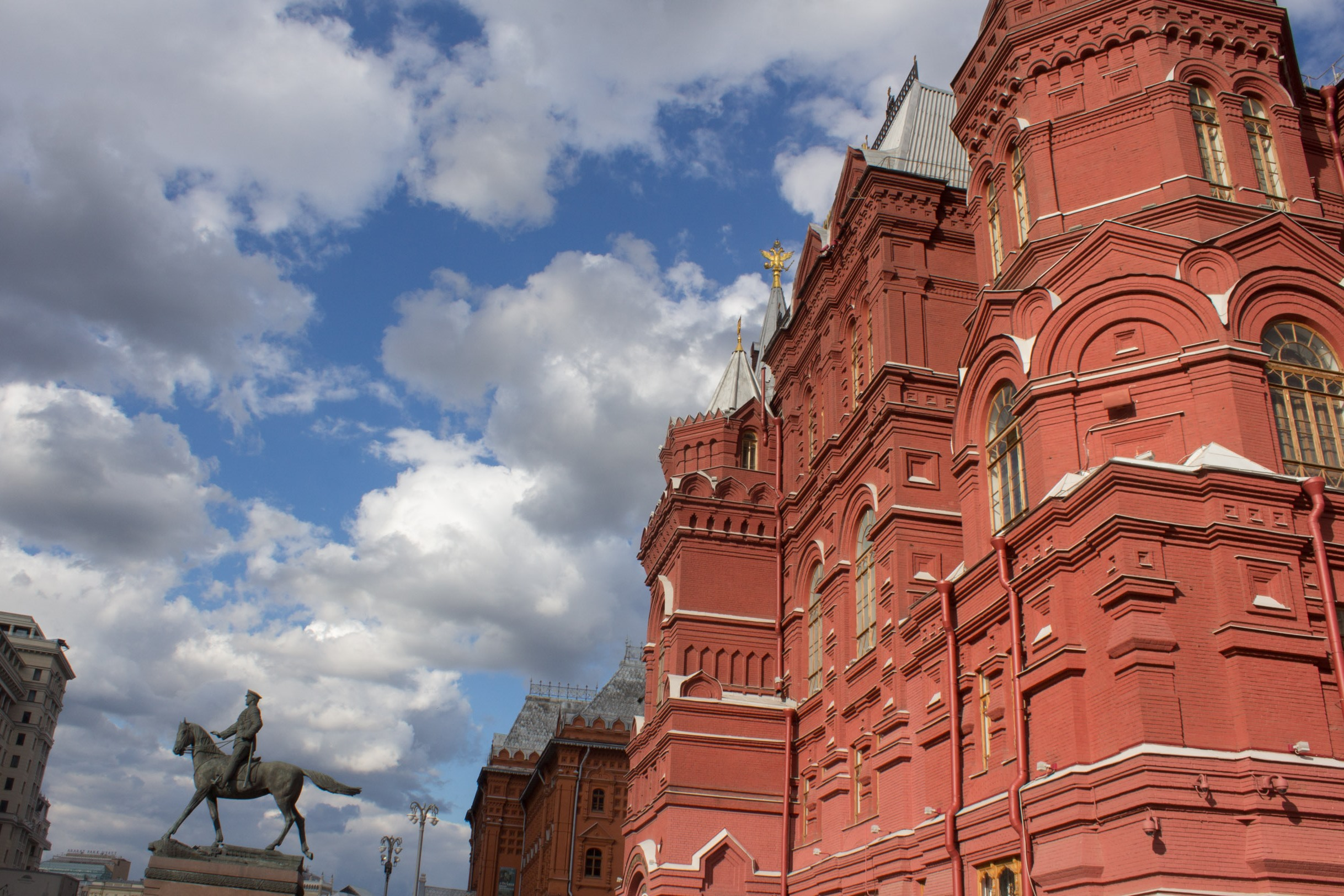

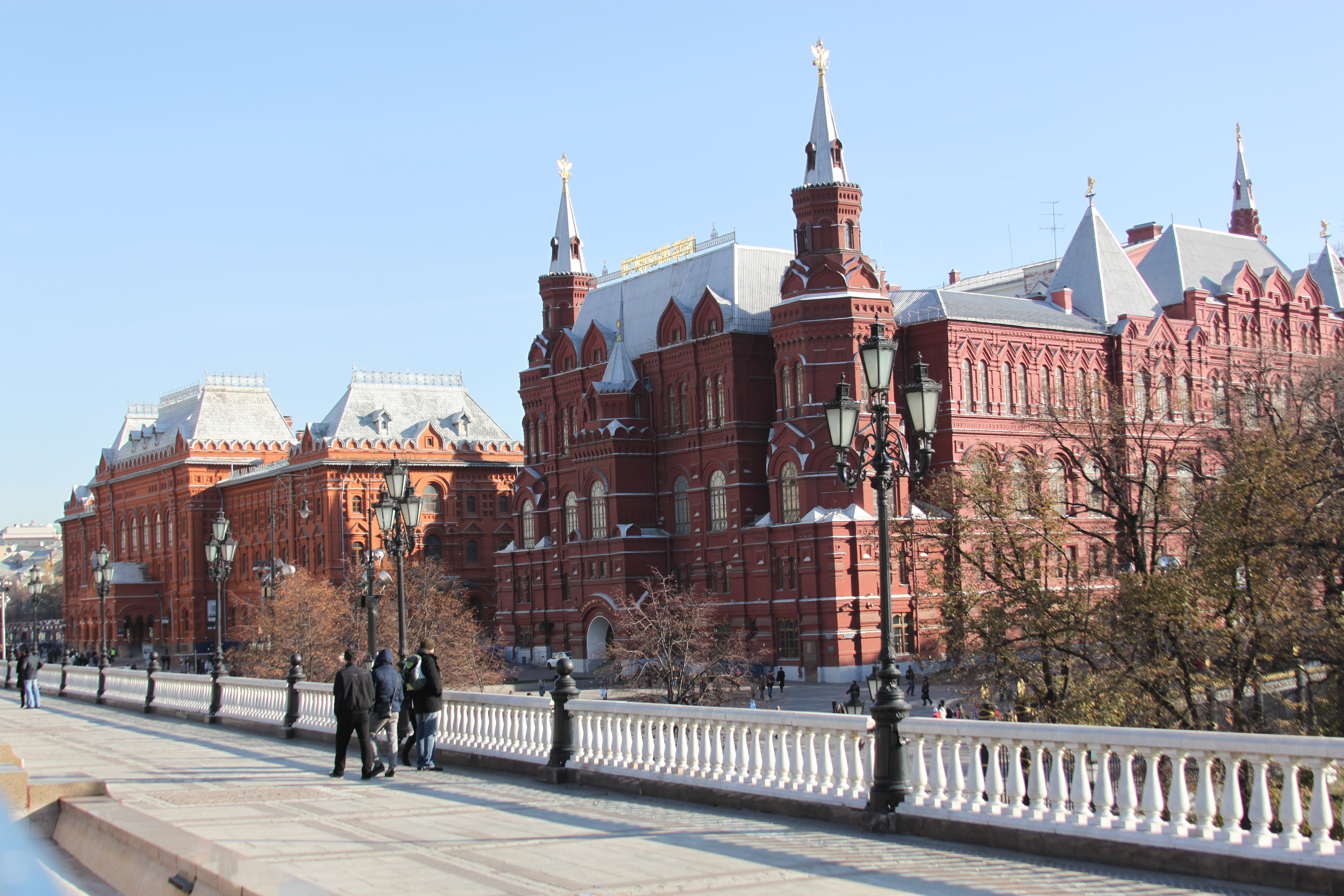

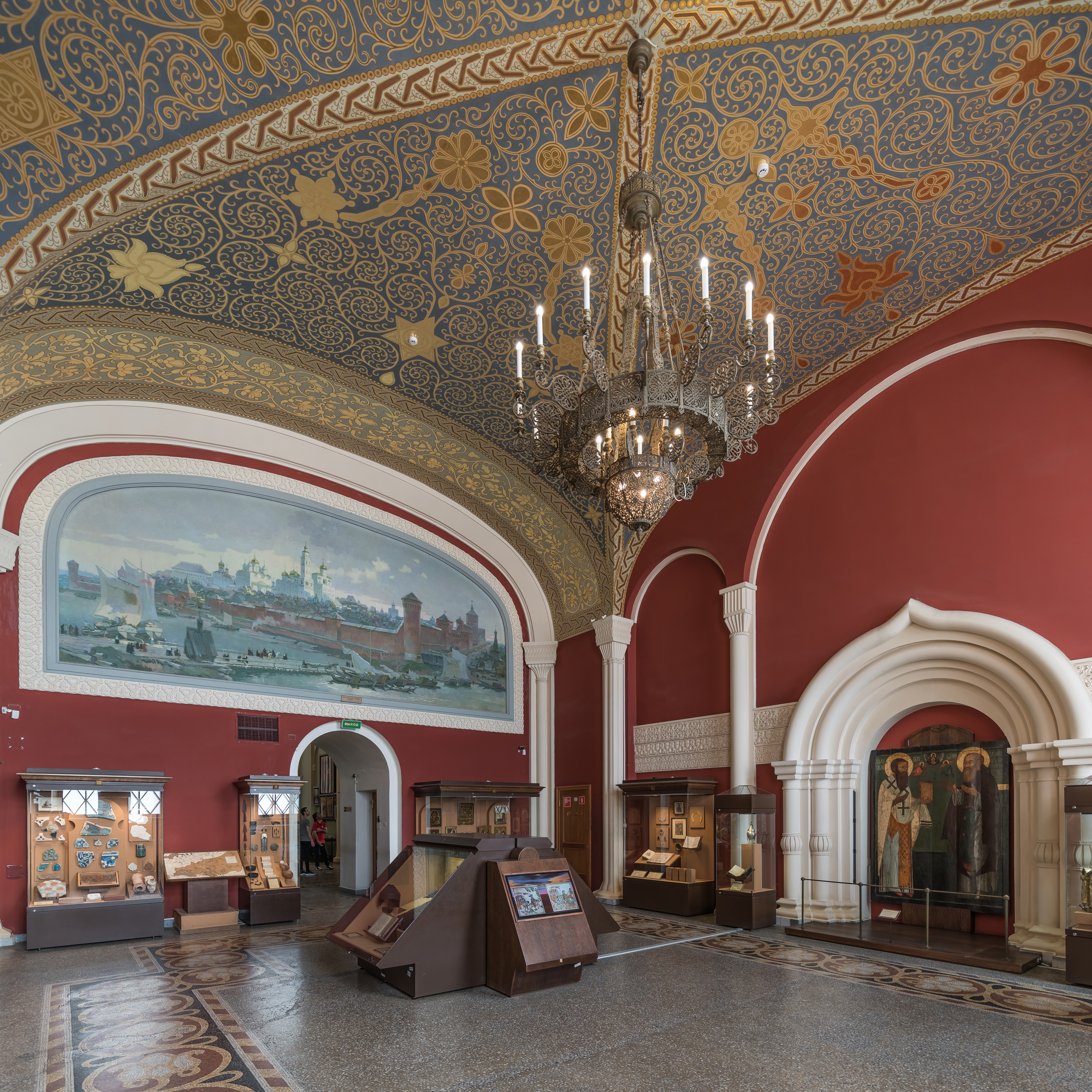
One of the exposition halls

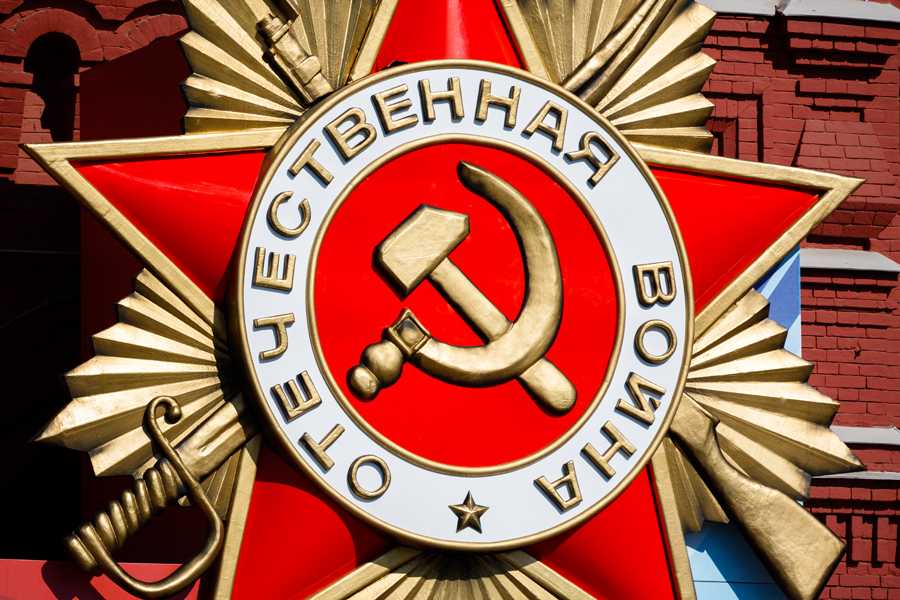
An Order of the Patriotic War being displayed on the museum at Victory Day Parade 2016.

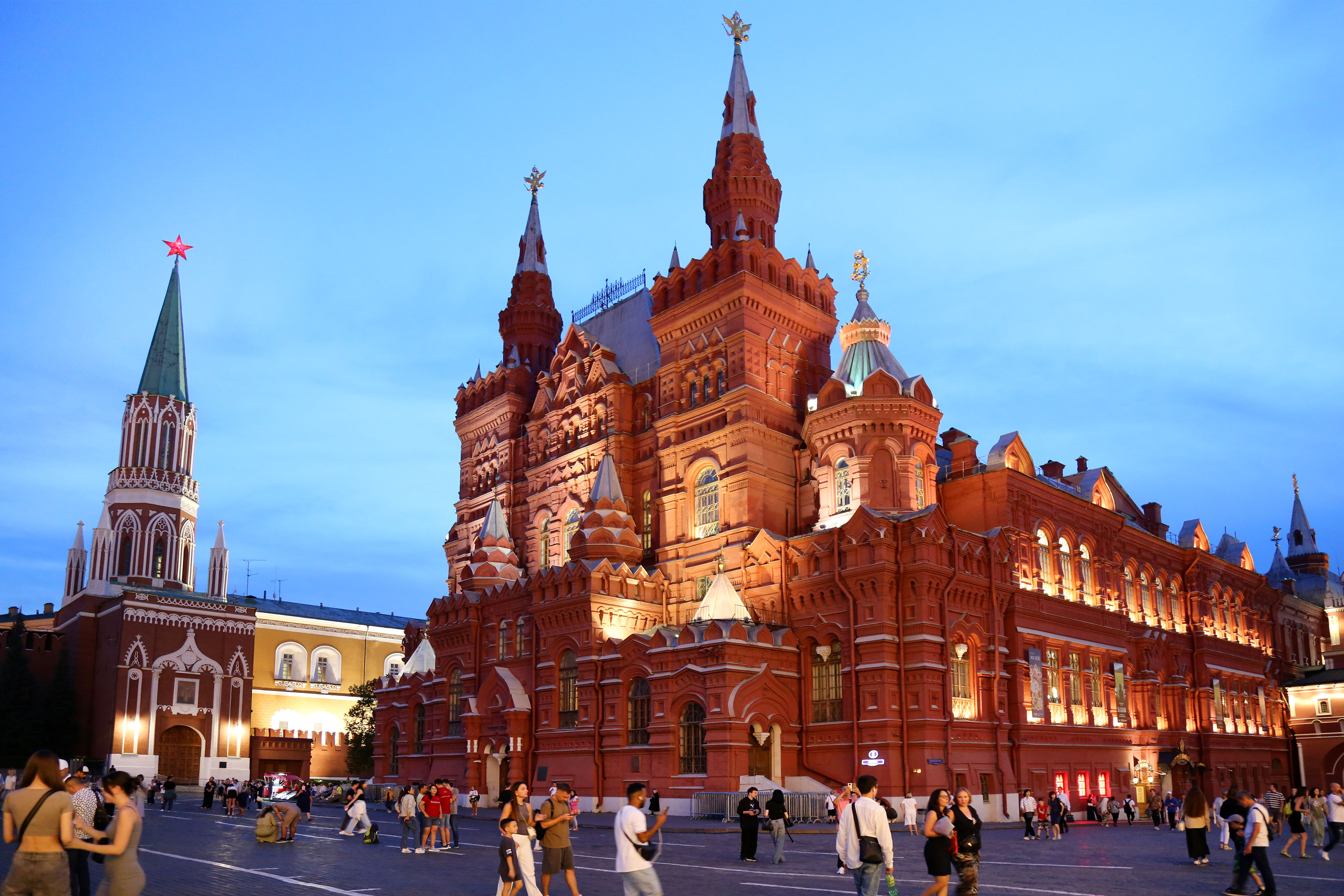
State Historical Museum, Red Square, Moscow, Russia

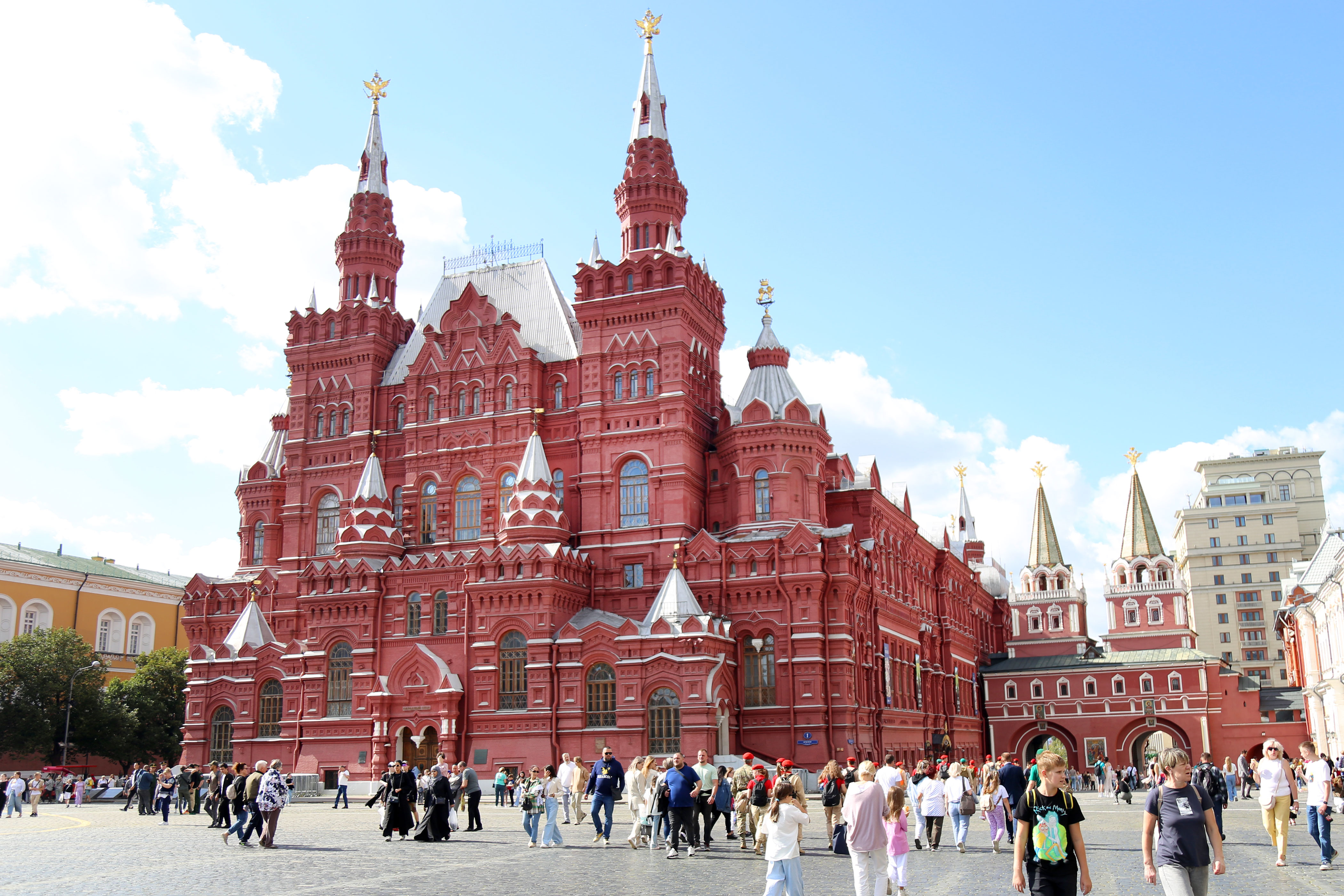
State Historical Museum, Red Square, Moscow, Russia

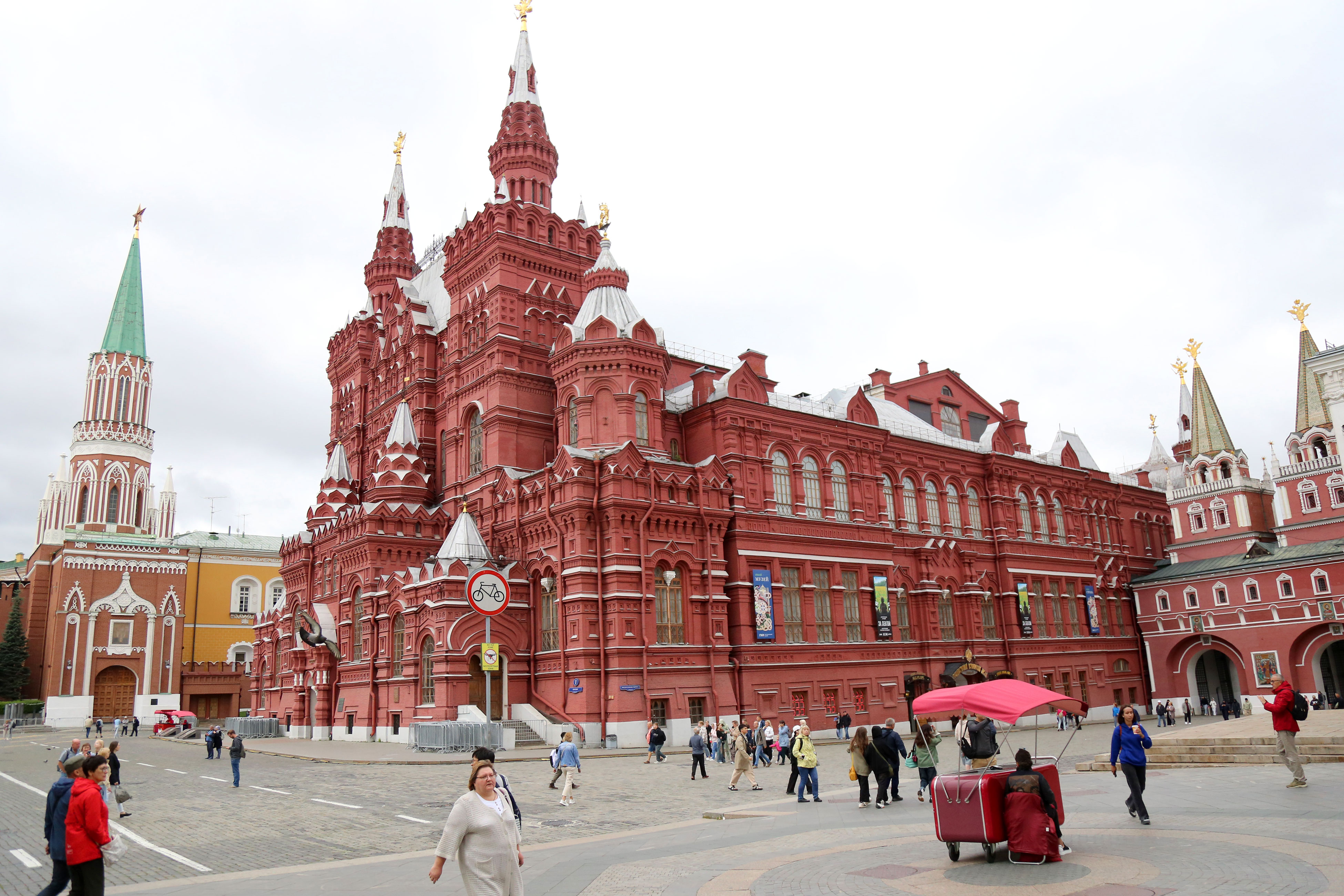
State Historical Museum, Red Square, Moscow, Russia

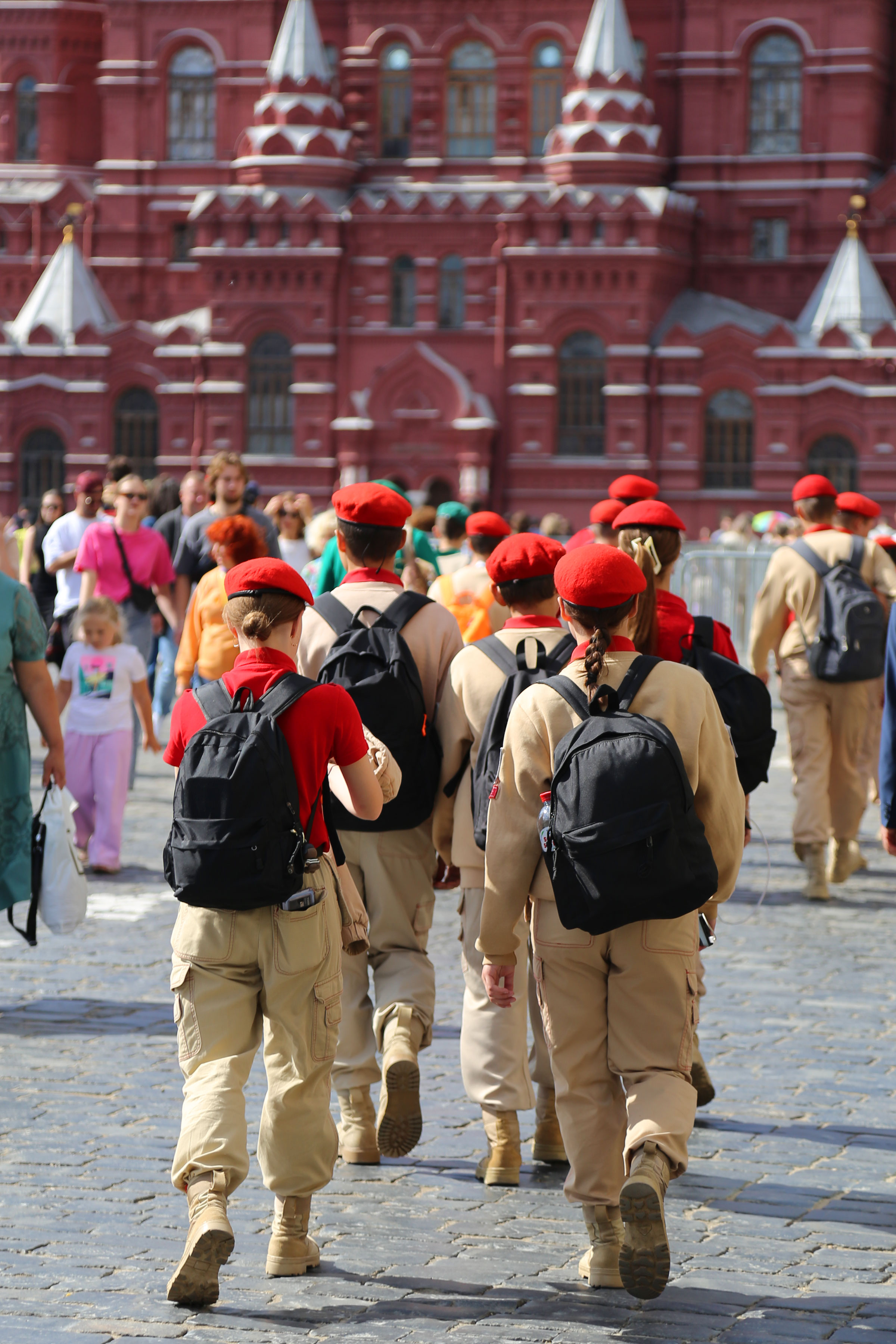
State Historical Museum, Red Square, Moscow, Russia

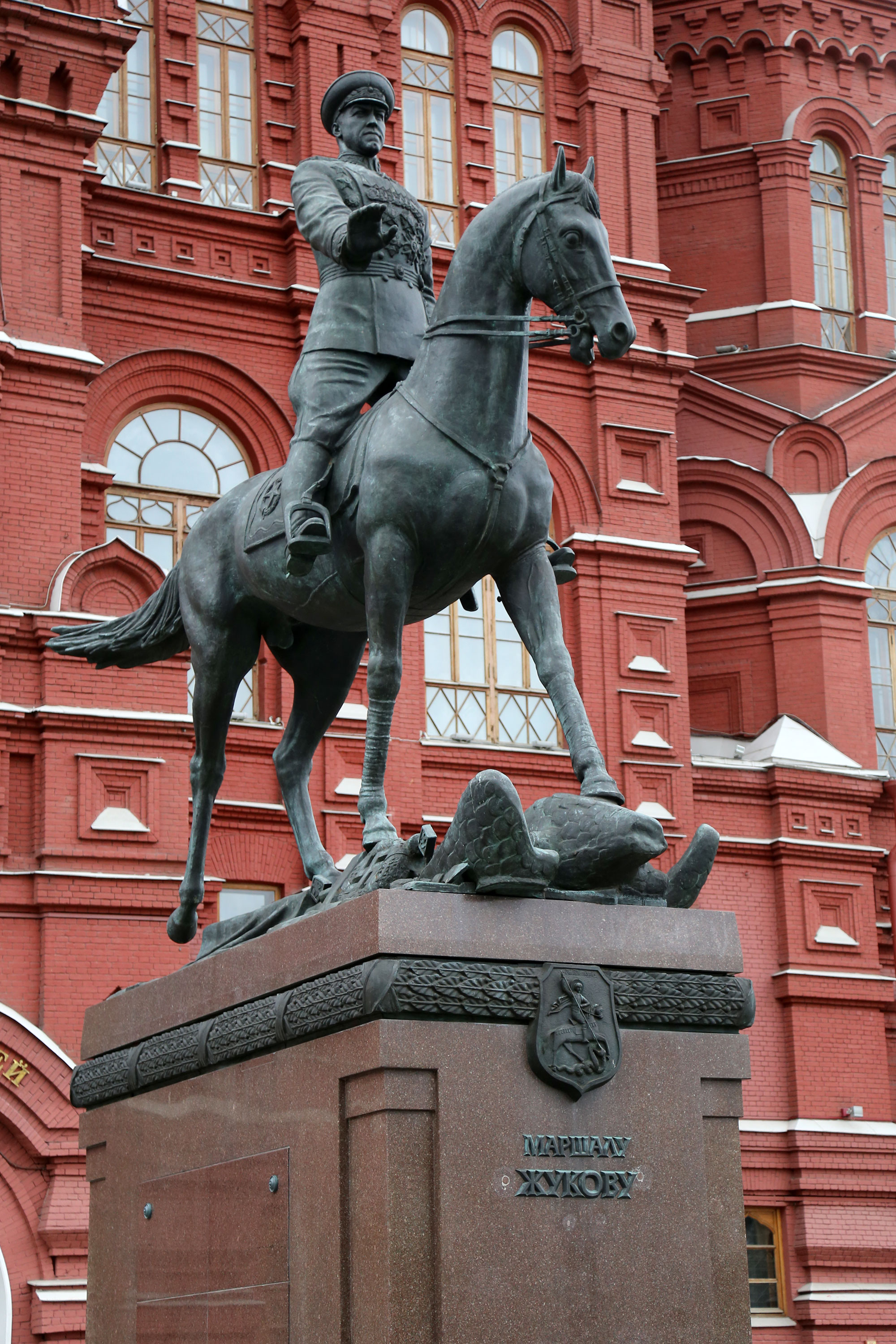
State Historical Museum, Red Square, Moscow, Russia

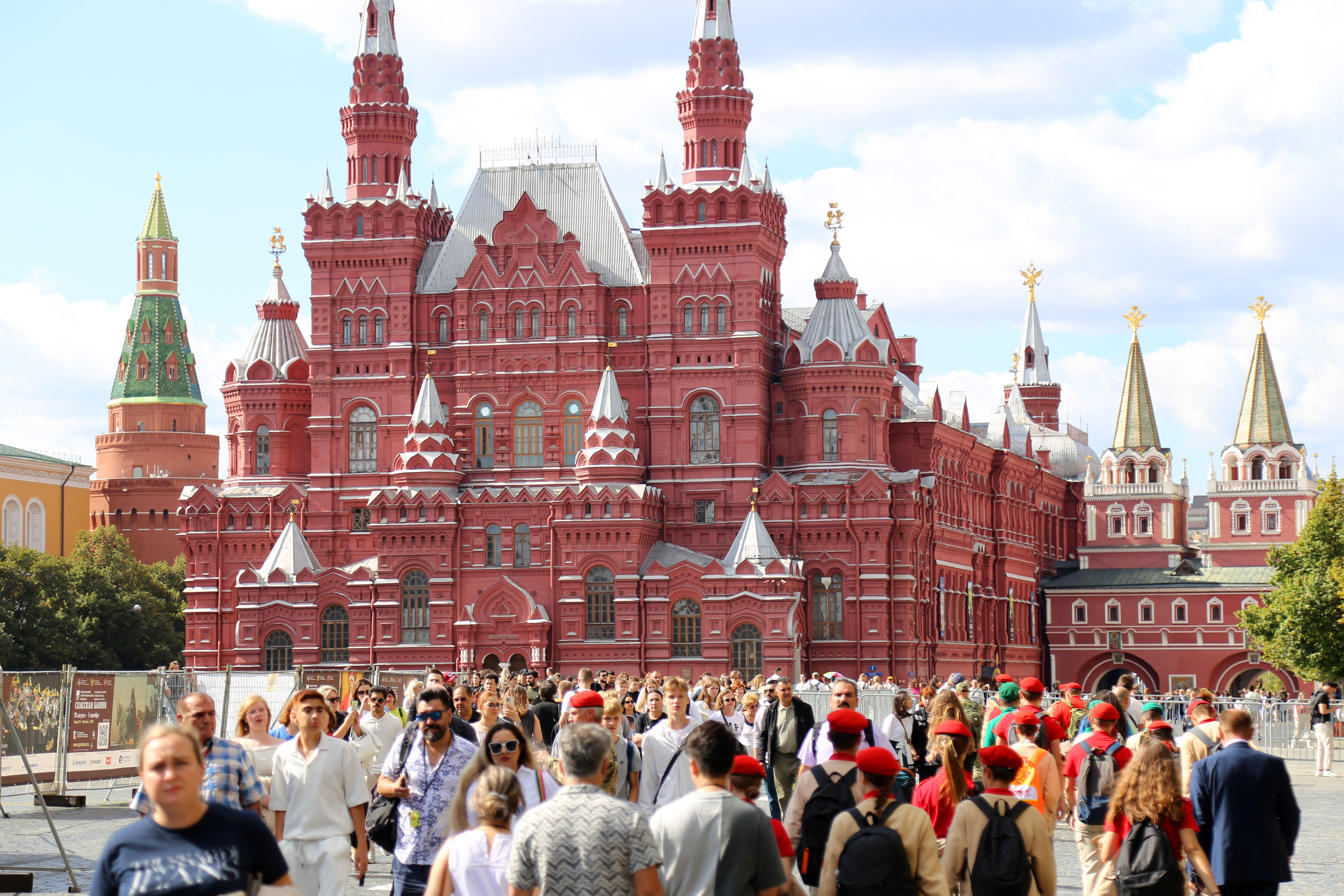
State Historical Museum, Red Square, Moscow, Russia
