= Christian Frederick Matthaei =

German academic (1744–1811)

Christian Frederick Matthaei (4 March 1744 – 26 September 1811) was a German palaeographer, classical philologist, and professor at the universities of Wittenberg and Moscow.

== Life ==
Matthaei was born in 1744 in the Electorate of Saxony village of Gröst, west of Leipzig. After studying theology, philosophy, and classical philology in Leipzig with Johann Jakob Reiske and Johann August Ernesti, he left for Moscow in 1772, where he spent twelve years as a high school teacher and then as a professor of classical philology at Moscow University. He returned to Germany in 1784, and in 1789 he took a position as professor of Greek at the University of Halle-Wittenberg, where he was appointed rector three years later. In 1804 he returned to his chair at Moscow University, where he remained for the rest of his life. His work focused especially on the Greek manuscripts that had been brought from Mount Athos to the synodal libraries in Moscow, the Bibliotheca Sanctissimae Synodi and the Bibliotheca Typographei Synodalis, of which he published both catalogues and editions.

Between 1782 and 1788 Matthaei prepared an edition of the Greek New Testament, faced with the Latin Vulgate translation, which was published in Riga in 12 volumes between 1782 and 1788. For this edition he collated some seventy manuscripts, as well as the biblical citations in the writings of John Chrysostom. For a second edition, published in 1803–1807, he collated an additional thirty manuscripts. The value of his text has been criticized because of his lack of modern critical method and his inability to distinguish the relative value of manuscripts based on their age, but his apparatus remains invaluable because of his skill as a palaeographer and the completeness and accuracy of his collations. The Anglican bishop Thomas Middleton described him as "the most accurate scholar who ever edited the N.T."

According to Oscar von Gebhardt, the author of a detailed discussion of his life and work published in 1898, Matthaei stole many Greek manuscripts during his work in the libraries of Moscow. While he kept some of these for himself, others he sold or gave away to libraries or friends in Germany and Holland.

== Works ==
1. Βίκτωρος πρεσβυτέρου Αντιοχείας καὶ ἄλλων τινῶν ἁγίων πατέρων ἐξήγησις εἰς τὸ κατὰ Μάρκον ἅγιον εὐαγγέλιον ex codibus Mosquensibus (Moscow, 1775).
2. Lectiones Mosquenses (Leipzig, 1779).
3. D. Pavli Epistolae ad Thessalonicenses et Ad Timotheum Graece et Latine (Riga, 1785).
4. D. Pauli Epistola I. et II. ad Corinthios, Graece et Latine (Riga, 1783).
5. Joannis Apocalypsis Graece et Latine (Riga, 1785).
6. Vetustum ecclesiae Graecae, Constantinopolitanae, ut videtur, Evangeliarum bibliothecae Serenissimi Ducis Saxo-Gothani (Leipzig, 1791).
7. XIII epistolarum Pauli codex Graecus cum versione latina veteri vulgo Antehieronymiana olim Boernerianus nunc bibliothecae electoralis Dresdensis (Meissen, 1791).
8. Novum Testamentum Graece et Latine (Riga, 1782–1788).
9. Novum Testamentum Graece (Wittenberg, 1803–1807).
