= Minuscule 215 =

- New Testament manuscript
- Text: Gospels
- Date: 11th century
- Script: Greek
- Now at: Biblioteca Marciana
- Size: 33 cm by 23.5 cm
- Type: Byzantine
- Category: V
- Note: full marginalia

Minuscule 215 (in the Gregory-Aland numbering), A^{134} (Soden), is a Greek minuscule manuscript of the New Testament, on parchment. Paleographically it has been assigned to the 11th century. It has full marginalia.

== Description ==
The codex contains a complete text of the four Gospels, on 272 parchment leaves (size 33 cm by 23.5 cm), with a commentary. The text is written in one column per page, 24 lines per page (biblical text). The commentary on Matthew is by Chrysostomos, that on Mark, Victorinus of Pettau, Luke, Titus of Bostra, that on John is by Chrysostomos.

The text is divided according to the κεφαλαια (chapters), whose numbers are given at the margin, and their τιτλοι (titles of chapters) at the top of the pages. There is also a division according to the Ammonian Sections (in Mark 237 sections, the last in 16:14), with references to the Eusebian Canons (written below Ammonian Section numbers).

It contains the Epistula ad Carpianum, the Eusebian tables, tables of the κεφαλαια (tables of contents) before each Gospel, lectionary markings at the margin for liturgical use, synaxaria, and pictures (later hand). It has the famous Jerusalem Colophon ("from the ancient manuscripts of Jerusalem").

The manuscript is a duplicate of the codex 20 and 300, as well in its text as in the subscriptions and commentary, being without any later corrections seen in codex 20.

== Text ==
The Greek text of the codex is a representative of the Byzantine text-type. Aland placed it in Category V.

It was not examined by using Claremont Profile Method.

== History ==
It was examined by Birch, Burgon, and Riccoboni. C. R. Gregory saw the manuscript in 1886.

It is currently housed at the Biblioteca Marciana (Gr. Z 544 (591)), at Venice.

== See also ==
- List of New Testament minuscules
- Biblical manuscript
- Textual criticism
