= Minuscule 230 =

- New Testament manuscript
- Name: Codex Escurialensis
- Text: Gospels
- Date: 1013
- Script: Greek
- Now at: Escurial
- Size: 21.8 cm by 17 cm
- Type: Caesarean text-type
- Category: III
- Note: member of ƒ^{13}

Minuscule 230 is a Greek minuscule manuscript of the New Testament Gospels, made of parchment. It is designated by the siglum 230 in the Gregory-Aland numbering of New Testament manscruipts, and ε 173 in the von Soden numbering of New Testament manuscripts. It is dated by a colophon to the year 1013 CE.

== Description ==
The manuscript is a codex (precursor to the modern book format), containing the complete text of the four Gospels on 218 parchment leaves (sized 21.8 cm by 17 cm), with a small gap of John 20:27-21:12 due to a missing page. The leaves are arranged in quarto (four leaves in quire). The text is written in two columns per page, 24 lines per page.

It contains the Epistle to Carpian, the tables of contents (known as κεφαλαια / kephalaia) before each Gospel, a synaxaria, a Menologion, doubled Menologion, subscriptions at the end of each Gospel, with the numbers of phrases (known as ρηματα / rhemata), and numbers of lines (known as στιχοι / stichoi) in the subscriptions.

== Text ==
The Greek text of the codex is considered to be a representative of the Caesarean text-type. Biblical scholar Kurt Aland placed it in Category III of his New Testament manuscript classification system. Category III manuscripts are described as having "a small but not a negligible proportion of early readings, with a considerable encroachment of [Byzantine] readings, and significant readings from other sources as yet unidentified."

The manuscript belongs to the textual family Ferrar Group (ƒ^{13}). According to the Claremont Profile Method (a specific analysis of textual data), it represents textual group Λ in Luke 1, Luke 10, and Luke 20, though in Luke 20 it is a very weak member.

== History ==
The colophon reads as follows: Ετελειωθη η ιερα βιβλος αυτη μην οκτωβριω κθ, ημερα παρασκευη, ωρα θ, ετει ςφκβ. Ινδ. Ιβ. Γραφεν δια χειρος Λουκα μοναχου και ευτελους ιερεως (This Holy Book was completed on the 29th of October, a Friday, at the ninth hour, in the year 6522, Indiction 12. Written by the hand of Loukas, monk and humble priest.). According to E. Miller this date corresponds to 1014 CE. But later scholars had noted this actually is deciphered as 1013 A.D. The manuscript was written by "Luke", a monk and scribe.

It was described by Moldenhawer, who collated it about 1783 CE for Birch. It was briefly described by Emmanuel Miller in 1848. Scholar Jacob Greelings examined the text of the Gospel of John.

It is currently housed at the Real Biblioteca del Monasterio de El Escorial (shelf number Cod. Escurialensis, y. III. 5).

== See also ==
- Minuscule 231
- Minuscule 229
- List of New Testament minuscules
- Biblical manuscript
- Textual criticism

== Exteranl links ==
- Digital Colour Images of Minuscule 230 online at the Patrimonio Nacional.
