= Minuscule 922 =

- New Testament manuscript
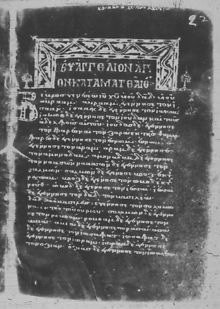
- The beginning of the Gospel of Matthew
- Text: New Testament
- Date: 12th century
- Script: Greek
- Now at: Osiou Gregoriou monastery
- Size: 14.2 cm by 10.5 cm
- Type: Byzantine
- Category: V
- Note: marginalia

Minuscule 922 (in the Gregory-Aland numbering), δ 200 (von Soden), is a 12th-century Greek minuscule manuscript of the New Testament on parchment. It has marginalia. The manuscript has survived in complete condition.

== Description ==
The codex contains the text of the New Testament, on 405 parchment leaves (size 14.2 cm by 10.5 cm). The text is written in one column per page, 28 lines per page.

The order of books: Gospels, Book of Acts, Catholic epistles, Pauline epistles, and Book of Revelation.

The text of the Gospels is divided according to the κεφαλαια (chapters), whose numbers are given at the margin, and their τιτλοι (titles of chapters) at the top of the pages. There is also a division according to the smaller Ammonian Sections (in Mark 241 sections, the last section in Mark 16:20), whose numbers are given at the margin. There are no references to the Eusebian Canons.

It contains tables of the κεφαλαια (tables of contents) before each of the biblical books and subscriptions at the end of each of the books (as in Codex Tischendorfianus III and Minuscule 566). These subscriptions were called Jerusalem Colophon.

== Text ==
The Greek text of the codex is a representative of the Byzantine. Kurt Aland placed it in Category V. It was not examined by the Claremont Profile Method.

The text of the Pericope Adulterae (John 7:53-8:11) is marked at the margin by an obelus (÷) as doubtful.

== History ==
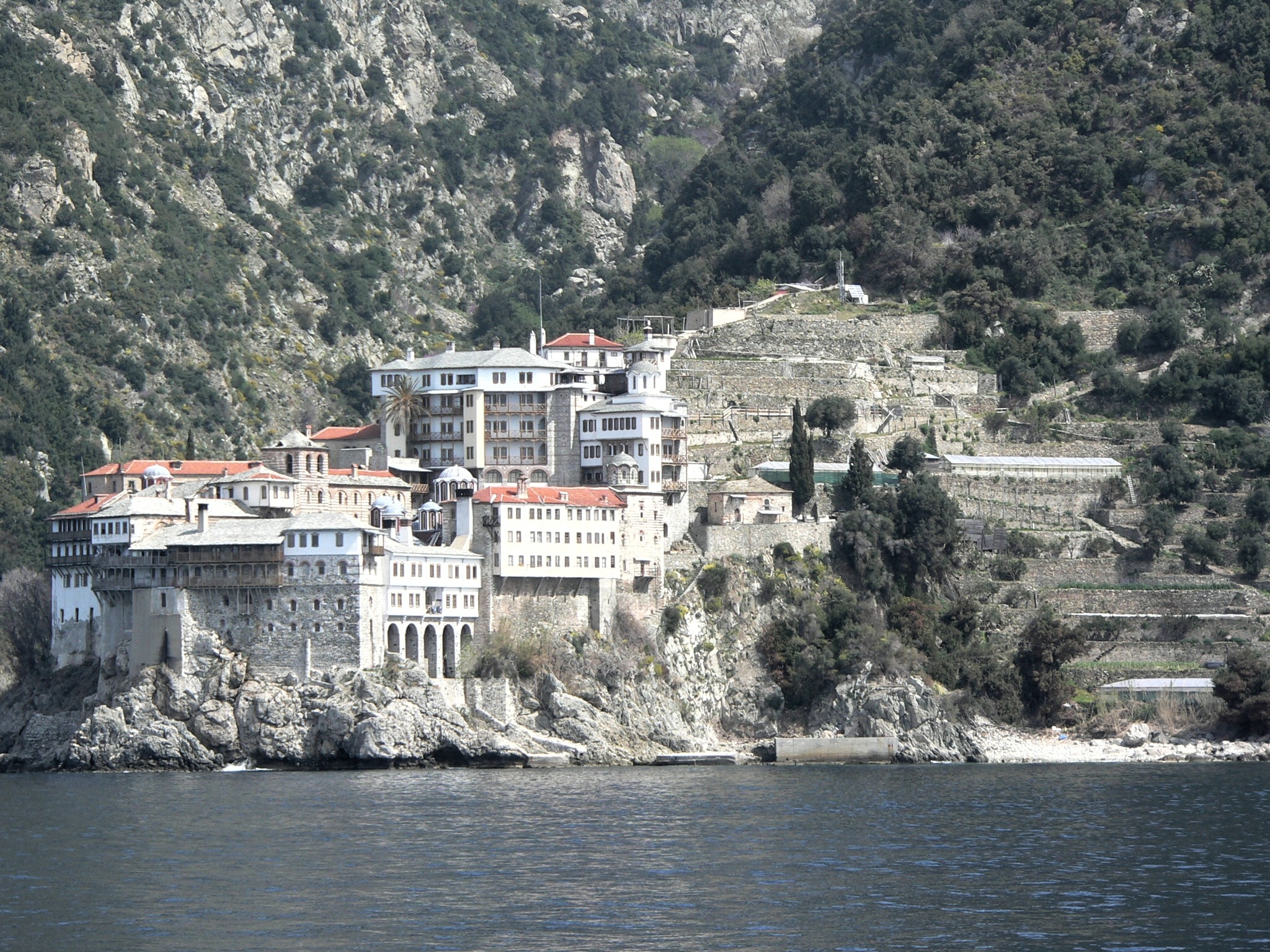
View on the monastery Gregoriu

According to C. R. Gregory it was written in the 13th century. Currently the manuscript is dated by the INTF to the 12th century. It was written by Constantinus, a monk. The history of the codex 922 is known until the year 1886, when it was seen by Gregory at the Osiou Gregoriou monastery, in Mount Athos. The manuscript is still housed at the Osiou Gregoriou monastery (3).

The manuscript was added to the list of New Testament manuscripts by Gregory (922^{e}). It was not on the Scrivener's list, but it was added to his list by Edward Miller in the 4th edition of A Plain Introduction to the Criticism of the New Testament.

Herman C. Hoskier examined and collated its text only in the Revelation of John.

It is not cited in the critical editions of the Greek New Testament (UBS4, NA28).

== See also ==
- List of New Testament minuscules (1–1000)
- Minuscule 897 (Gregory-Aland)
- Minuscule 1187 (Gregory-Aland)
- Biblical manuscript
- Textual criticism
