= Minuscule 200 =

- New Testament manuscript
- Text: Gospels
- Date: 11th century
- Script: Greek
- Now at: Laurentian Library
- Size: 22.4 cm by 17.5 cm
- Type: Byzantine text-type
- Category: V
- Note: marginalia

Minuscule 200 is a Greek minuscule manuscript of the New Testament Gospels, written on parchment. It is designated by the siglum 200 in the Gregory-Aland numbering of New Testament manuscripts, and ε 118 in the von Soden numbering of New Testament manuscripts. Using the study of comparative writing styles (palaeography), it has been dated to the 11th century. The manuscript has marginal notes.

== Description ==
The manuscript is a codex (precursor to the modern book format), containing the complete text of the four Gospels written on 229 parchment leaves (22.4 cm by 17.5 cm). The text is written in two columns per page, 25 lines per page. The ink used is either light brown or dark brown for some pages, with the capital letters written in gold ink.

The text is divided according to the chapters (known as κεφαλαια / kephalaia), whose numbers are given in the margin, and their titles (known as τιτλοι / titloi) written at the top of the pages. There is also a division according to the Ammonian Sections, whose numbers are written in gold ink in the margin. There is also references to the Eusebian Canons, which are written in red ink below the Ammonian Section numbers (both early divisions of the Gospels into sections).

It contains pictures, the Epistle to Carpian, the Eusebian Canon tables, with the tables of contents (also known as κεφαλαια) placed before each Gospel, and fragments of a work by Gregory of Nyssa called "Against the Arians." The Synaxarion and Menologion were added in the 14th century.

== Text ==
The Greek text is considered to be a representative of the Byzantine text-type. Biblical scholar Kurt Aland placed it in Category V of his New Testament manuscript classification system. Category V manuscripts are described as "manuscripts with a purely or predominantly Byzantine text."

According to the Claremont Profile Method (a specific analysis of textual data), it represents textual cluster Π200. The verses in John 7:53-8:11 (known as the Pericope Adulterae), are marked with an obelus to indicate the passage is considered to be doubtful.

== History ==
The earliest history of the manuscript is unknown. It once belonged to Antonio Corbinelli († 1423) and together with Minuscule 199 it was presented to Benedictine monastery. It was examined by textual critic Andreas Birch, and church clergyman Dean Burgon. Biblical scholar Caspar René Gregory saw it in 1886.

It is currently dated by the INTF to the 11th century. It is presently housed at the Laurentian Library (shelf number Conv. Sopp. 160), in Florence.

== See also ==
- List of New Testament minuscules
- Biblical manuscript
- Textual criticism
