= Lectionary 40 =

Lectionary ℓ 40
- New Testament manuscript
- Text: Evangelistarion
- Date: 10th-century
- Script: Greek
- Now at: Escorial
- Size: 29 cm by 25.5 cm
- Type: Byzantine text-type
- Hand: neatly written

Lectionary 40, designated by siglum ℓ 40 (in the Gregory-Aland numbering). It is a Greek manuscript of the New Testament, on parchment leaves. Palaeographically it has been assigned to the 10th-century.

== Description ==
The codex contains lessons from the Gospels of John, Matthew, Luke lectionary (Evangelistarium), with lacunae. The text is written in two columns per page, 14 lines per page, in Greek uncial letters, on 207 parchment leaves (29 cm by 25.5 cm).

== History ==
The manuscript is dated by the INTF to the 10th century.

Formerly the manuscript belonged to Maria, Queen of Hungary, who obtained it from John Diassorin. Maria presented the manuscript to Philip II.

Emmanuel Miller who examined all manuscripts housed in the Escorial library did not describe this manuscript.

It was examined by Daniel Gotthilf Moldenhawer and Andreas Birch. Moldenhawer was allowed to see it for a few hours and collated only 15 lessons (for Andreas Birch).

The manuscript is not cited in the critical editions of the Greek New Testament (UBS3).

Currently the codex is located in the Escorial (Ψ. I. 14) in San Lorenzo de El Escorial.

== See also ==
- List of New Testament lectionaries
- Biblical manuscript
- Textual criticism
