= Minuscule 442 =

- New Testament manuscript
- Text: Catholic epistles, Pauline epistles
- Date: 12th/13th century
- Script: Greek
- Now at: University of Uppsala
- Size: 23 cm by 17 cm
- Type: Alexandrian text-type
- Category: II

Minuscule 442 (in the Gregory-Aland numbering), O^{18} (in the Soden numbering), is a Greek minuscule manuscript of the New Testament, on parchment. Palaeographically it has been assigned to the 12 or 13th century. Formerly it was assigned by 68^{a} and 73^{p}. It shared all these designations with Minuscule 441, with which it now comprises a single codex.

== Description ==
The codex contains the text of the Catholic epistles and 1 Corinthians 13:6 to Hebrews 13:25 of the Pauline epistles on 129 parchment leaves (23 cm by 17 cm). It is written in one column of 38-39 lines per page.

It contains the Euthalian Apparatus, subscriptions at the end of each book, στιχοι, and four prolegomena to the Hebrews. The biblical text is surrounded by a catena of Oecumenius.

Leaves 3-182 form another manuscript which is now bound in the same codex. These leaves have a duplicate portion (1 Cor 13:6-15:38) and some contradictory readings. Now they are classified as Minuscule 441.

== Text ==
The Greek text of the codex is representative of the Alexandrian text-type with some alien readings. Aland placed it in Category II. It is one of the witnesses of the textual variant ὃς ἐφανερώθη (he was manifested) in Timothy 3:16. This reading is supported by such Alexandrian manuscripts as Codex Sinaiticus, Codex Alexandrinus, Codex Ephraemi, Minuscule 33, Minuscule 225, and Minuscule 2127, but it is also confirmed by the manuscripts of the Western text-type like Codex Augiensis and Codex Boernerianus.

In 1 John 5:6 it has the textual variant δι' ὕδατος καὶ πνεύματος καὶ αἵματος (through water and spirit and blood) together with these manuscripts and versions: Codex Porphyrianus, 81, 88, 630, 915, 2492, arm, eth. (Note: For another variants of this verse see: Textual variants in the First Epistle of John.) Bart D. Ehrman identified this reading as Orthodox corruption.

== History ==
The codex was bought at Venice (along with Minuscule 441 and Minuscule 899) by Johan Gabriel Sparwenfeld in 1678.

Peter Fabian Aurivill published facsimile of two fragments of the codex (with text of the Acts 10:34-38 and 1 Timothy 3:16). It was examined by Adolf Michaelis, and Johannes Belsheim. Caspar René Gregory saw it in 1891.

The manuscript was added to the list of the New Testament manuscripts by Scholz (1794-1852).

Formerly it was labelled by 68^{a} and 73^{p}. In 1908 Gregory gave the number 442 to it.

The codex is cited in critical editions of the Greek New Testament (NA26).

It is currently housed at the University of Uppsala (Gr. 1, p. 183-440) in Uppsala.

== See also ==
- List of New Testament minuscules
- Biblical manuscript
- Textual criticism
