= Minuscule 164 =

- New Testament manuscript
- Name: Codex Barberinianus 13
- Text: Gospels
- Date: 1039
- Script: Greek
- Now at: Vatican Library
- Size: 17.4 cm by 13.7 cm
- Category: none
- Note: marginalia

Minuscule 164 (in the Gregory-Aland numbering), ε 116 (Soden), is a Greek minuscule manuscript of the New Testament, on parchment. It is dated by its colophon to the year 1039. It has complex contents, with full marginalia.

== Description ==
The codex contains a complete text of the four Gospels on 214 parchment leaves (size 17.4 cm by 13.7 cm). The text is written in one column per page, in 19 lines per page. The text of Matthew 7:12-8:4 on folios 15-16 was added by a later hand.

The text is divided according to the κεφαλαια (chapters), whose numbers are given at the margin, and the τιτλοι (titles of chapters) at the top of the pages. There is also a division according to the Ammonian Sections (in Mark 237 - 16:15), with references to the Eusebian Canons (written below Ammonian Section numbers).

It contains the Epistula ad Carpianum, Eusebian Canon tables, tables of the κεφαλαια (tables of contents) before each Gospel, lectionary markings at the margin (for liturgical use), subscriptions at the end of each book, numbers of στιχοι, and pictures. The Synaxarion and Menologion were added by a later hand. It has the famous Jerusalem Colophon ("from the ancient manuscripts of Jerusalem").

== Text ==
Aland the Greek text of the codex did not place it in any Category. According to Black it represents the Alexandrian text-type. According to the Claremont Profile Method in Luke 1; 10; 20 it is close to Codex Tischendorfianus III and related to 1443.

The Pericope Adulterae (John 7:53-8:11) is marked by an obelus.

== History ==
The subscription states that it was written by Leo, a priest and calligrapher, in October 1193, and bought in 1168 by Bartholomeus, who compared it with ancient Jerusalem manuscripts on the sacred mount.

It was examined by Birch (about 1782) and Scholz (1794–1852). C. R. Gregory saw the manuscript in 1886.

It is currently housed at the Vatican Library (Barberini gr. 319), at Rome.

== See also ==
- List of New Testament minuscules
- Biblical manuscript
- Textual criticism
