= Minuscule 428 =

- New Testament manuscript
- Name: Monacensis 381
- Text: Gospels
- Date: 13th century
- Script: Greek
- Now at: Bavarian State Library
- Size: 32 cm by 23 cm
- Type: mixed
- Category: none
- Note: no marginalia

Minuscule 428 (in the Gregory-Aland numbering), Θ^{ε33} (in the Soden numbering), is a Greek minuscule manuscript of the New Testament, on cotton paper. Palaeographically it has been assigned to the 13th century.

== Description ==
The codex contains the text of the four Gospels on 335 paper leaves (32 cm by 23 cm). It is written in one column per page, in 33 lines per page.

It contains rude pictures of Evangelists on a vellum leaf and commentary of Theophylact. It has the famous the Jerusalem Colophon in Gospel of Matthew. It contains subscriptions like codex 262. It has pictures, some excerpts from Hippolitus, Eusebius, Isidor, and Hesuchius.

Textually seems to be a copy from the codex 300, or taken from the same manuscripts.

Kurt Aland did not place the Greek text of the codex in any Category.

== History ==
The manuscript was added to the list of New Testament manuscripts by Scholz (1794–1852). Scholz examined major part of it. It was also examined by Dean Burgon. C. R. Gregory saw it in 1886.

Formerly the manuscript was held in Augsburg. It is currently housed at the Bavarian State Library (Gr. 381) in Munich.

== See also ==
- List of New Testament minuscules
- Biblical manuscript
- Textual criticism
- Minuscule 427
