= Minuscule 899 =

- New Testament manuscript
- Text: Gospels †
- Date: 11th century
- Script: Greek
- Found: Venice
- Now at: University of Uppsala
- Size: 15 cm by 11.5 cm
- Type: Byzantine text-type

Minuscule 899 (in the Gregory-Aland numbering) is a Greek minuscule manuscript of the New Testament, on parchment. Palaeographically it has been assigned to the 11th century.

== Description ==
The codex contains the text of the Gospels on 208 parchment leaves (15 cm by 11.5 cm). It is written in one column of 25-26 lines per page. The headpiece of Luke is missing, there is a lacuna at John 16:5-17:8, and John 21:17-25 is supplemented in another hand.

The text of the Gospels is divided according to the κεφαλαια (chapters), whose numbers are given at the margin, and their τιτλοι (titles of chapters) at the top of the pages. There is also a division according to the smaller Ammonian Sections (in Mark 241 sections, the last section in 16:20), whose numbers are given at the margin, with references to the Eusebian Canons (written below Ammonian Section numbers).

It contains decorated Eusebian canon tables and illustrations of the evangelists.

It references the Jewish Gospel in a scholion at Matthew 12:40. It contains the Jerusalem Colophon after each of the gospels.

== Text ==
The Greek text of the codex is representative of the Byzantine text-type, except in John. In the Pericope de Adultera, it does not contain the Apollinarius scholion. According to the Claremont Profile Method, it is a core member of the group Lambda.

The Greek text of this codex is mixed. Aland did not place it in any Category.

== History ==
The codex is dated by the INTF to the 11th century.

The codex was bought at Venice (along with Minuscule 441) by Johan Gabriel Sparwenfeld in 1678.

The manuscript was added to the list of New Testament manuscripts by Gregory (899^{e}).

It is currently housed at the University of Uppsala (Gr. 4) in Uppsala.

== See also ==
- List of New Testament minuscules
- Biblical manuscript
- Textual criticism
