= Jerusalem Colophon =

The Jerusalem Colophon is a colophon found in a number of New Testament manuscripts, including Λ (039), 20, 153, 157, 164, 215, 262, 300, 376, 428, 565, 566, 686, 718, 728, 748, 829, 899, 901, 922, 980, 1032, 1071, 1118, 1121, 1124, 1187, 1198, 1355, 1422, 1521, 1545, 1555, 1682, 2145, and 2245. The full version of the colophon is

εὐαγγέλιον κατὰ Ματθαῖον ἐγράφη καὶ ὰντεβλήθη ἐκ τῶν Ἱεροσολύμοις παλαιῶν ἀντιγράφων τῶν ἐν τῷ Ἁγίῳ Ὃρει ἀποκειμένων ἐν στίχοις ͵β̅φ̅ι̅δ̅. κεφφ. τ̅ν̅ε̅.

– that the manuscript (in this case the "Gospel According to Matthew") was "copied and corrected from the ancient exemplars from Jerusalem preserved on the Holy Mountain" (according to the majority of scholars, this refers to Mount Athos) in 2514 verses and 355 chapters.

Usually the colophon is abbreviated in subsequent mentions in the same manuscript. The texts of the manuscripts that share the colophon are not necessarily textually related (though a surprising number belong to Group Λ (039), 164, 262, and perhaps some of the many manuscripts Frederik Wisse does not classify). In many cases the colophon was copied down from document to document independent of the text. The majority of these manuscripts are representative of the Byzantine text-type.

The meaning of the colophon was discussed by Kirsopp Lake. Lake holds that the "Holy Mountain" is Mount Sinai.

According to Caspar René Gregory it would be possible that the manuscript Tischendorfianus III was written and corrected in Jerusalem.

== Bibliography ==
- K. Aland and B. Aland, "The Text of the New Testament: An Introduction to the Critical Editions and to the Theory and Practice of Modern Textual Criticism", trans. Erroll F. Rhodes, William B. Eerdmans Publishing Company, Grand Rapids, Michigan 1995.
- Bruce M. Metzger, The Text of the New Testament: Its Transmission, Corruption, and Restoration, Oxford University Press, New York, Oxford 1980.
