= Minuscule 166 =

- New Testament manuscript
- Text: Luke, John †
- Date: 11th/12th century
- Script: Greek
- Now at: Vatican Library
- Size: 21.2 cm by 16.5 cm
- Category: none
- Note: marginalia

Minuscule 166 (in the Gregory-Aland numbering), ε 306 (Soden), is a Greek minuscule manuscript of the New Testament, on parchment. Palaeographically it has been assigned to the 11th or 12th century. It has marginalia.

== Description ==
The codex contains only the text Gospel of Luke 9:33-24:24 and Gospel of John 1:23-21:25 on 75 thick parchment leaves (size 21.2 by 16.5 cm). The text is written in one column per page, in 27 lines per page (size of text 14.1 by 10.5 cm), in black ink, capital letters in red.

The text is divided according to the κεφαλαια (chapters), whose numbers are given at the margin, and the τιτλοι (titles of chapters) at the top of the pages. There is also a division according to the Ammonian Sections, with references to the Eusebian Canons (written below Ammonian Section numbers).

It contains lectionary markings at the margin for liturgical reading.

== Text ==
Kurt Aland the Greek text of the codex did not place in any Category.

According to the Claremont Profile Method it belongs to the textual group Λ in Luke 10 and Luke 20 as a core member. In Luke 1 the manuscript is defective.

The texts of Christ's agony at Gethsemane (Luke 22:43-44) and Pericope Adulterae (John 7:53-8:11) are marked by an obelus.

== History ==
C. R. Gregory dated it to the 13th century.

The subscription states that the manuscript was written by Leo, a priest and calligrapher, in October 1193.

It was examined by Birch (about 1782) and Scholz (1794–1852). Gregory saw it in 1886.

It is currently housed at the Vatican Library (Barb. gr. 412), at Rome.

== See also ==
- List of New Testament minuscules
- Biblical manuscript
- Textual criticism
