= Lectionary 43 =

Lectionary ℓ 43
- New Testament manuscript
- Text: Evangelistarion
- Date: 13th-century
- Script: Greek
- Now at: Escorial
- Size: 23.8 cm by 20 cm

Lectionary 43, designated by siglum ℓ 43 (in the Gregory-Aland numbering). It is a Greek manuscript of the New Testament, on parchment leaves. Palaeographically it has been assigned to the 13th-century.

== Description ==
The codex contains lessons from the Gospels of John, Matthew, Luke lectionary (Evangelistarium), on 313 parchment leaves (23.8 cm by 20 cm), with lacuna at the beginning. The leaves are arranged in quarto (four leaves in quire). The text is written in two columns per page, 25 lines per page. in Greek uncial letters.

According to Scrivener it is written in large cursive letters.

== History ==
The manuscript was examined by Moldenhauer and Emmanuel Miller.

The manuscript is not cited in the critical editions of the Greek New Testament (UBS3).

Currently the codex is located in the Escorial (X. III. 16) in San Lorenzo de El Escorial.

== See also ==
- List of New Testament lectionaries
- Biblical manuscript
- Textual criticism
