= Lectionary 39 =

Lectionary ℓ 39
- New Testament manuscript
- Text: Evangelistarion, Apostolos
- Date: 13th-century
- Script: Greek
- Now at: Bibliothèque nationale de France
- Size: 24.8 cm by 18.9 cm
- Hand: neatly written

Lectionary 39, designated by siglum ℓ 39 (in the Gregory-Aland numbering), is a Greek manuscript of the New Testament, on parchment leaves. Palaeographically it has been assigned to the 13th century.

== Description ==
The codex contains lessons from the Gospels of John, Matthew, Luke lectionary (Evangelistarium), and from Acts and Epistles (Apostolos). It is neatly written in Greek minuscule letters, on 139 parchment leaves (24.8 cm by 18.9 cm). The text is written in two columns per page, there are 24 lines per page. It contains marginal notes in Arabic.

== History ==
The manuscript was written in a monastery in Palestine. It was examined by Birch, Paulin Martin, and Gregory.

The manuscript is not cited in the critical editions of the Greek New Testament (UBS3).

Currently the codex is located in the Bibliothèque nationale de France (Suppl. Gr. 104) in Paris.

== See also ==
- List of New Testament lectionaries
- Biblical manuscript
- Textual criticism
