= Ada Adler =

Danish classical scholar

Ada Sara Adler
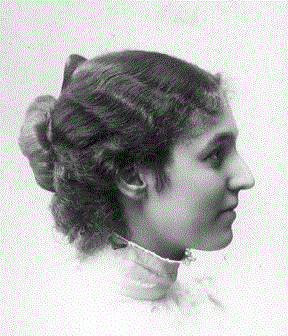
- Ada Adler c. 1900
- Born: 18 February 1878; Frederiksberg
- Died: 28 December 1946 (aged 68); Copenhagen
- Occupations: Librarian and classical scholar

Ada Sara Adler (18 February 1878 – 28 December 1946) was a Danish classical scholar and librarian.

She is best known for her critical edition of the Byzantine encyclopedia Suda (5 vols., 1928–38), which still provides the standard text.

== Biography ==
Adler was born on 18 February 1878, the daughter of Bertel David Adler and Elise Johanne, née Fraenckel. Her family was of high social standing and well-connected. Her grandfather, David Baruch Adler, was a wealthy banker and politician. Her aunt, Ellen Adler Bohr, was the mother of Niels Bohr and Harald Bohr. Through the Bohrs, she was also related to Danish psychologist Edgar Rubin.

Adler's early education was at Miss Steenberg's School and then N. Zahle's School, where she studied Ancient Greek under Anders Bjørn Drachmann beginning in 1893. She then went to the University of Copenhagen, where she continued to study Greek and comparative religion with Drachmann and also Professor Vilhelm Thomsen. In 1906, she completed her master's thesis on ancient Greek religion, as well as receiving an award from the Historical Philological Society for research on the myth of Pandora. In 1912, after finishing her master's, she traveled to Vienna to study, during which time she published a few articles on Greek religion and completed research and writing for Pauly-Wissowa.

In 1901, she married Danish philosopher Anton Thomsen, whom she had met at a dinner on 20 March 1897. Thomsen preserved an account of this first meeting in his diary, recalling how struck he was by her. They divorced in 1912.

During World War II, she was evacuated to Sweden with other Danish Jews. She taught Greek in the Danish school in Lund.

She is buried in Mosaisk Vestre Begravelsesplads near Copenhagen.

== Scholarly career ==
She is best known for her critical, standard edition of the Suda, which she published in 5 volumes (Leipzig, 1928–1938). She also contributed several articles to Pauly–Wissowa's Realencyclopädie. In 2016, Oxford University Press published a collection of essays honouring female classical scholars. The chapter on Adler was written by Catharine Roth, a current managing editor of the Suda On Line Project; Roth contextualizes Adler's seminal contribution to scholarship of the Suda as the kind of detailed cataloguing work which in the nineteenth century was granted to women while men did the more 'interesting' original research, but which was actually crucial to enabling further research (although the immense majority of scholarly cataloguing was also carried out by men at the time). Classical scholar William Calder, professor emeritus in classics at the University of Illinois at Urbana–Champaign, called Adler "incontestably the greatest woman philologist who ever lived'. German classical scholar Otto Weinreich, who lived roughly contemporary to Adler, called her edition of the Suda "bewundernswert" (worthy of admiration) in 1929, shortly after the appearance of the first volume.

In 1916, she published a catalog of Greek manuscripts in the Danish Royal Library. The collection had been compiled by Daniel Gotthilf Moldenhawer, who was the chief librarian in the eighteenth century. Adler was convinced some of the manuscripts in it had been stolen by Moldenhawer from libraries elsewhere in Europe. In 1931, she was awarded the Tagea Brandt Rejselegat, a Danish award for women's achievements in art and science. At the time of her death, she had made substantial progress towards a first edition of the Etymologicum Genuinum, a project continued under the direction of Klaus Alpers.

Her work is noted to have been completed in both Rome and Florence in 1913 through the spring of 1914, and later years (1919 and 1920) in Paris, Venice, Oxford, and Florence.

== Works ==
- 1914: Die Commentare des Asklepiades von Myrlea, Hermes 49.1: 39–46
- 1916: Catalogue supplémentaire des manuscrits grecs de la Bibliothèque Royale de Copenhague.
- 1917: D. G. Moldenhawer og hans haandskriftsamling. Copenhagen https://www.kb.dk/permalink/2006/manus/780/dan/
- 1920: Den græske litteraturs skæbne i oldtid og middelalder. Copenhagen.
- 1928–1938: Suidae Lexicon. Leipzig: B. G. Teubner. 5 vols.
- 1932: Die Homervita im Codex Vindobonensis Phil. 39, Hermes 67.3: 363–366
