= Minuscule 262 =

- New Testament manuscript
- Text: Gospels
- Date: 10th century
- Script: Greek
- Now at: National Library of France
- Size: 32.9 cm by 25 cm
- Type: Byzantine text-type
- Category: V
- Note: marginalia

Minuscule 262 (in the Gregory-Aland numbering), ε 1020 (Soden), is a Greek minuscule manuscript of the New Testament, on parchment. Palaeographically it has been assigned to the 10th century. It has marginalia.

== Description ==
The codex contains the text of the four Gospels on 212 parchment leaves (32.9 cm by 25 cm). The text is written in two columns per page, in 27 lines.

The text is divided according to the κεφαλαια (chapters), whose numbers are given at the margin, and some τιτλοι (titles of chapters) at the top of the pages. The Ammonian Sections and references to the Eusebian Canons to Gospel of Luke and Gospel of John were added by a later hand.

It contains lists of the κεφαλαια (tables of contents) before each Gospel, and subscriptions at the end of each Gospel.

It has the famous Jerusalem Colophon ("from the ancient manuscripts of Jerusalem").

== Text ==
The Greek text of the codex is a representative of the Byzantine text-type. Hermann von Soden classified it to the textual group I^{r}. Aland placed it in Category V.

According to the Claremont Profile Method it represents textual group Λ.

It has some rare readings like codex Λ, 300, 376, and 428.

== History ==
According to Gregory it could have been written in Italy. In 1735 it was brought from Constantinople to Europe.

The manuscripts was added to the list of New Testament manuscripts by Scholz (1794-1852). It was examined and described by Paulin Martin. C. R. Gregory saw the manuscript in 1884.

The manuscript is currently housed at the Bibliothèque nationale de France (Gr. 53) at Paris.

== See also ==
- List of New Testament minuscules
- Biblical manuscript
- Textual criticism
