= Minuscule 897 =

- New Testament manuscript
- Text: Gospels †
- Date: 13th century
- Script: Greek
- Found: 1869
- Now at: Edinburgh University Library
- Size: 23.9 cm by 17.2 cm
- Type: Byzantine
- Category: V
- Note: marginalia

Minuscule 897 (in the Gregory-Aland numbering), ε 361 (von Soden), is a 13th-century Greek minuscule manuscript of the New Testament on parchment. It has marginalia. The manuscript has not survived in complete condition.

== Description ==
The codex contains the text of the four Gospels, on 327 parchment leaves (size 23.9 cm by 17.2 cm), with some lacunae. The text is written in one column per page, 17 lines per page. According to Hermann von Soden it has decorated headpieces and initials.

It lacks texts of Matthew 1:1-7:6; 27:63-18:7; Luke 22:36-47; 23:45-24:1; John 8:8:33-10:24 (12:18-14:21).

The text of the Gospels is divided according to the κεφαλαια (chapters), whose numbers are given at the margin, and their τιτλοι (titles of chapters) at the top of the pages. There is also a division according to the smaller Ammonian Sections (in Mark 239 sections, the last section in Mark 16:20), whose numbers are given at the margin. There are no references to the Eusebian Canons.

It contains lists of the κεφαλαια (tables of contents) before each of the Gospels, lectionary markings at the margin (for liturgical use), and subscriptions at the end of each of the Gospels.

== Text ==
The Greek text of the codex is a representative of the Byzantine. Hermann von Soden classified it to the textual family K^{r}. Kurt Aland placed it in Category V.

According to the Claremont Profile Method, it represents the textual family K^{r} in Luke 1 and Luke 20 as perfect member. In Luke 10 no profile was made.

The text of the Pericope Adulterae (John 7:53-8:11) have dashes in margins next to each line in John 8.3–11 (folio 277a–278a).

== History ==
According to C. R. Gregory, it was written in the 13th century. The manuscript is dated by the INTF to the 13th century. Of the history of the codex 897 nothing is known until the year 1869, when it was bought by David Laing. Gregory saw it in 1883.

The manuscript was added to the list of New Testament manuscripts by Gregory (897^{e}). It was not on the Scrivener's list, but it was added to his list by Edward Miller in the 4th edition of A Plain Introduction to the Criticism of the New Testament.

It is not cited in critical editions of the Greek New Testament (UBS4, NA28).

The manuscript is housed at the Edinburgh University Library (Ms. 220 (D Laing 6)), in Edinburgh.

== See also ==
- List of New Testament minuscules (1–1000)
- Minuscule 922
- Minuscule 1187
- Biblical manuscript
- Textual criticism
