= Minuscule 161 =

- New Testament manuscript
- Name: Codex Barberinianus 10
- Text: Gospels †
- Date: 10th
- Script: Greek
- Now at: Vatican Library
- Size: 20.4 cm by 15.7 cm
- Type: some western readings
- Category: none
- Note: marginalia

Minuscule 161 (in the Gregory-Aland numbering), ε 1005 (Soden), is a Greek minuscule manuscript of the New Testament, on parchment. Palaeographically it has been assigned to the 10th century. The manuscript is lacunose. It has full marginalia.

== Description ==
The codex contains the text of the four Gospels on 203 thick parchment leaves (size 20.4 cm by 15.7 cm), with one large lacuna (John 16:4–21:25).

The text is written two columns per page, in 23–26 lines per page, in brown ink, the capital letters in red and gold.

The text is divided according to the κεφαλαια (chapters), whose numbers are given at the margin, and the τιτλοι (titles of chapters) at the top or the bottom of the pages, with a harmony. There is also a division according to the Ammonian Sections, with references to the Eusebian Canons (written below Ammonian Section numbers).

It contains tables of the κεφαλαια (tables of contents) before each Gospel. Lectionary markings were added by a later hand (for liturgical use).

Various readings are often noted in its margin.

== Text ==
Kurt Aland the Greek text of the codex did not place in any Category. According to the Claremont Profile Method it represents textual family Λ.

The Pericope Adulterae (John 7:53-8:11) is marked by an obelus. It contains western readings both in text (in John 3:6; 7:29; Luke 24:25) and in its marginal scholia.

== History ==
The manuscript was examined by Andrew Birch (about 1782). C. R. Gregory saw the manuscript in 1886.

It is currently housed at the Vatican Library (Barb. gr. 352), at Rome.

== See also ==
- List of New Testament minuscules
- Biblical manuscript
- Textual criticism
