= Minuscule 300 =

- New Testament manuscript
- Text: Matthew, Mark, Luke
- Date: 11th century
- Script: Greek
- Now at: Bibliothèque nationale de France
- Size: 33 cm by 23 cm
- Type: Byzantine text-type
- Category: V
- Note: marginalia

Minuscule 300 is a Greek minuscule manuscript of the New Testament, written on parchment. It is designated by the siglum 300 in the Gregory-Aland numbering of New Testament manuscripts, and A^{141} in the von Soden numbering of New Testament manuscripts. Using the study of comparative writing styles (palaeography), it has been dated to the 11th century. The manuscript has marginal notes.

== Description ==
The manuscript is a codex (precursor to the modern book format), containing the text of the Gospel of Matthew, Gospel of Mark, and the Gospel of Luke made of 328 parchment leaves (33 cm by 23 cm). The text is written in one column per page, 27-28 lines per page.

The text is divided according to the chapters (known as κεφαλαια / kephalaia), whose numbers are given in the margin, and their titles (known as τιτλοι / titloi) at the top of the pages. There is also a division according to the smaller Ammonian Sections (237 in Mark), with references to the Eusebian Canons written below the Ammonian section numbers (both early divisions of the Gospels into sections). It contains the tables of contents (also known as κεφαλαια) placed before each book, the synaxaria, the Menologion, and subscriptions at the end of each Gospel.

The biblical text is surrounded by a commentary (known as a catana). In the margins a later hand has added commentaries of John Chrysostom on Matthew, Victorinus of Pettau on Mark, and Titus of Bostra on Luke. Subscriptions to the first three Gospels are similar to those seen in Minuscule 262. It has the famous Jerusalem Colophon. The commentary text is considered to be close to that seen in Minuscule 20, and it is likely that both Minuscule 20 and Minuscule 300 were copied from the same examplar, with biblical scholar Frederick H. A. Scrivener referring to it as a "sister-copy."

== Text ==
The Greek text is considered to be a representative of the Byzantine text-type. Biblical scholar Kurt Aland placed it in Category V of his New Testament manuscript classification system. Category V manuscripts are described as "manuscripts with a purely or predominantly Byzantine text."

It was not examined by biblical scholar Frederik Wise according to his Claremont Profile Method (a specific analysis of textual data).

== History ==
The earliest history of the manuscript is unknown. It was added to the list of New Testament manuscripts by biblical scholar Johann M. A. Scholz (1794-1852). It was collated by Scholz, and examined and described by scholars John Anthony Cramer, Paulin Martin, and W. F. Rose.

It is currently dated by the INTF to the 11th century. It was formerly held in Fontainebleau. It is presently housed at the Bibliothèque nationale de France (shelf number Gr. 186) at Paris.

== See also ==
- List of New Testament minuscules
- Biblical manuscript
- Textual criticism
