= Minuscule 376 =

- New Testament manuscript
- Text: Gospels
- Date: 11th century
- Script: Greek
- Now at: Vatican Library
- Size: 10.9 cm by 7.8 cm
- Type: Byzantine text-type
- Category: V
- Note: marginalia

Minuscule 376 (in the Gregory-Aland numbering), ε 100 (Soden), is a Greek minuscule manuscript of the New Testament, on parchment. Paleographically it has been assigned to the 11th century. It has marginalia.

== Description ==
The codex contains the text of the four Gospels on 185 parchment leaves (10.9 cm by 7.8 cm). The text is written in one column per page, in 28 lines per page. The text of Luke 1:42-71 and two leaves in Mark were supplied by a later hand.

The text is divided according to the κεφαλαια (chapters), whose numbers are given at the margin, and their τιτλοι (titles of chapters) at the top of the pages. There is also a division according to the smaller Ammonian Sections (in Mark 241 Sections, the last in 16:21; also in subscription 241).

It contains the tables of the κεφαλαια (tables of contents) before each Gospel, subscriptions at the end of each Gospel, and the famous Jerusalem Colophon.

Text of Matthew 16:2b–3 (signs of the times) is omitted, text of Pericope Adulterae (John 7:53-8:11) is marked by an obelus.

== Text ==
The Greek text of the codex is a representative of the Byzantine text-type. Aland placed it in Category V.

According to the Claremont Profile Method it belongs to the textual family K^{x} in Luke 1 (partly illegible), Luke 10, and Luke 20. It belongs to the textual cluster 183.

== History ==
The manuscript was given by Francis Accidas in 1585 to Pope Sixtus V. The manuscript was added to the list of New Testament manuscripts by Scholz (1794-1852). C. R. Gregory saw it in 1886.

The manuscript is currently housed at the Vatican Library (Vat. gr. 1539) in Rome.

== See also ==
- List of New Testament minuscules
- Biblical manuscript
- Textual criticism
