= Minuscule 710 =

- New Testament manuscript
- Text: Gospels †
- Date: 13th century
- Script: Greek
- Found: 1883
- Now at: Bodleian Library
- Size: 18 cm by 12.5 cm
- Type: Byzantine text-type
- Category: none
- Note: K^{x}

Minuscule 710 (in the Gregory-Aland numbering), ε348 (von Soden), is a Greek minuscule manuscript of the New Testament, on parchment. Palaeographically it has been assigned to the 13th century. The manuscript is lacunose. Scrivener labelled it as 81^{e}.

== Description ==
The codex contains the text of the four Gospels on 183 parchment leaves (size 18 cm by 12.5 cm), with some lacunae.

Lacunae

Matthew 19:15-21:19; 21:31-41; 22:7-28:20; Mark 1:9-3:18; 3:35-15:15; 15:32-16:14; Luke 1:8-2:19; 3:17-4:40; 5:8-22:5; 22:36-23:10; John 8:4-21:18.

The text is written in one column per page, 23-24 lines per page.

The text is divided according to the κεφαλαια (chapters), whose numbers are given the left margin, and their τιτλοι at the top; there is also a division according to the Ammonian Sections, without a references to the Eusebian Canons.

== Text ==
The Greek text of the codex is a representative of the Byzantine text-type. Hermann von Soden classified it to the textual family K^{x}. Kurt Aland did not place it in any Category.

According to the Claremont Profile Method it represents mixed Byzantine text in Luke 1, K^{x} in Luke 10, and textual group Λ in Luke 20.

== History ==
Scrivener and Gregory dated the manuscript to the 13th century. Currently the manuscript is dated by the INTF to the 13th century.

It was bought in 1883 from William Ward, who brought the manuscript from Ephesus.

It was added to the list of New Testament manuscripts by Scrivener (81) and Gregory (710). Gregory saw the manuscript in 1883.

At present the manuscript is housed at the Bodleian Library (MS. Auct. T. inf. 1. 5) in Oxford.

== See also ==
- List of New Testament minuscules
- Biblical manuscript
- Textual criticism
