= Minuscule 21 =

- New Testament manuscript
- Text: Gospels †
- Date: 12th century
- Script: Greek
- Now at: National Library of France
- Size: 23 cm by 18 cm
- Type: mixed
- Category: V
- Note: marginalia

Minuscule 21 is a Greek minuscule manuscript of the New Testament Gospels, written on parchment. It is designated by the siglum 21 in the Gregory-Aland numbering of New Testament manuscripts, and ε 286 in the von Soden numbering of New Testament manuscripts.. Using the study of comparative handwriting styles (palaeography), it has been assigned to the 12th century. Other scholars date the manuscript to the 10th century. It has marginal notes and liturgical books.

== Description ==
The manuscript is a codex (precursor to the modern book format), containing the text of the four Gospels (with some missing portions) on 203 parchment leaves (sized 23 cm by 18 cm). It is missing Mark 13:28-14:33, and Luke 1:10-58; 21:26-22:50. The text is written in two columns per page in black ink, with the writing columns sized 16.3 by 4.6 cm. The initial letters are written in either red or blue ink.

The text is divided according to the chapters (known as κεφαλαια / kephalaia), whose numbers are given in the margin, and their titles (known as τιτλοι / titloi) written at the top of the pages. There is also a division according to the Ammonian Sections (237 in Mark, last section at 16:15), but without reference to the Eusebian Canons (both early divisions of the Gospels into sections).

It contains lessons (known as αναγνωσεις / anagnoseis), and pictures. The number of lessons in Matthew is 129, 190 in Mark, 309 in Luke, and 379 in John. Liturgical books with hagiographies, the Synaxaria and Menologion were added by later hand in the 15th century on paper.

The text of John 5:4 is marked with an obelus, which signifies doubt as to the passages authenticity. The text of the pericope adulterae (John 7:53-8:11) is omitted.

== Text ==
The Greek text of the codex is considered to be of an admixture of text-types. It contains some Western and Caesarean elements, however the Byzantine text-type is predominate. Biblical scholar Kurt Aland placed it in Category V of his New Testament manuscript classification system. According to the Claremont Profile Method (a specific analysis of textual data), it represents textual family K^{x} in Luke 1, Luke 10, and Luke 20.

In Matthew 27:9 it has variant ἐπληρώθη τὸ ῥηθὲν διὰ Ἰησαίου τοῦ προφήτου (fulfilled what was spoken by Isaiah the prophet). This variant is only supported by a Latin manuscript, Codex Rehdigeranus. Another manuscripts contain "Jeremiah" or omit the name of the prophet.

== History ==
The earliest history of the manuscript is unknown. It was probably written in Calabria. At the end of Luke it has a note saying: κυριε σωσων με, τον αμαρτωλον ονησιμον (the Lord save me, the sinner, Onesimus). This leads scholars to presume someone named Onesimus was the one who copied the manuscript.

It was partially collated by biblical scholar Johann M. A. Scholz (1794-1852). It was examined and described by scholar Paulin Martin. Biblical scholar Caspar René Gregory saw the manuscript in 1885.

It is dated by the INTF to the 12th century. It was held in Fontainebleau. It is currently housed at the Bibliothèque nationale de France (shelf number Gr. 68) in Paris.

== See also ==
- Minuscule 22
- Minuscule 20
- List of New Testament minuscules
- Textual criticism
- Biblical manuscript
