= Martin Mijtens the Elder =

Dutch-Swedish painter (1648–1736)

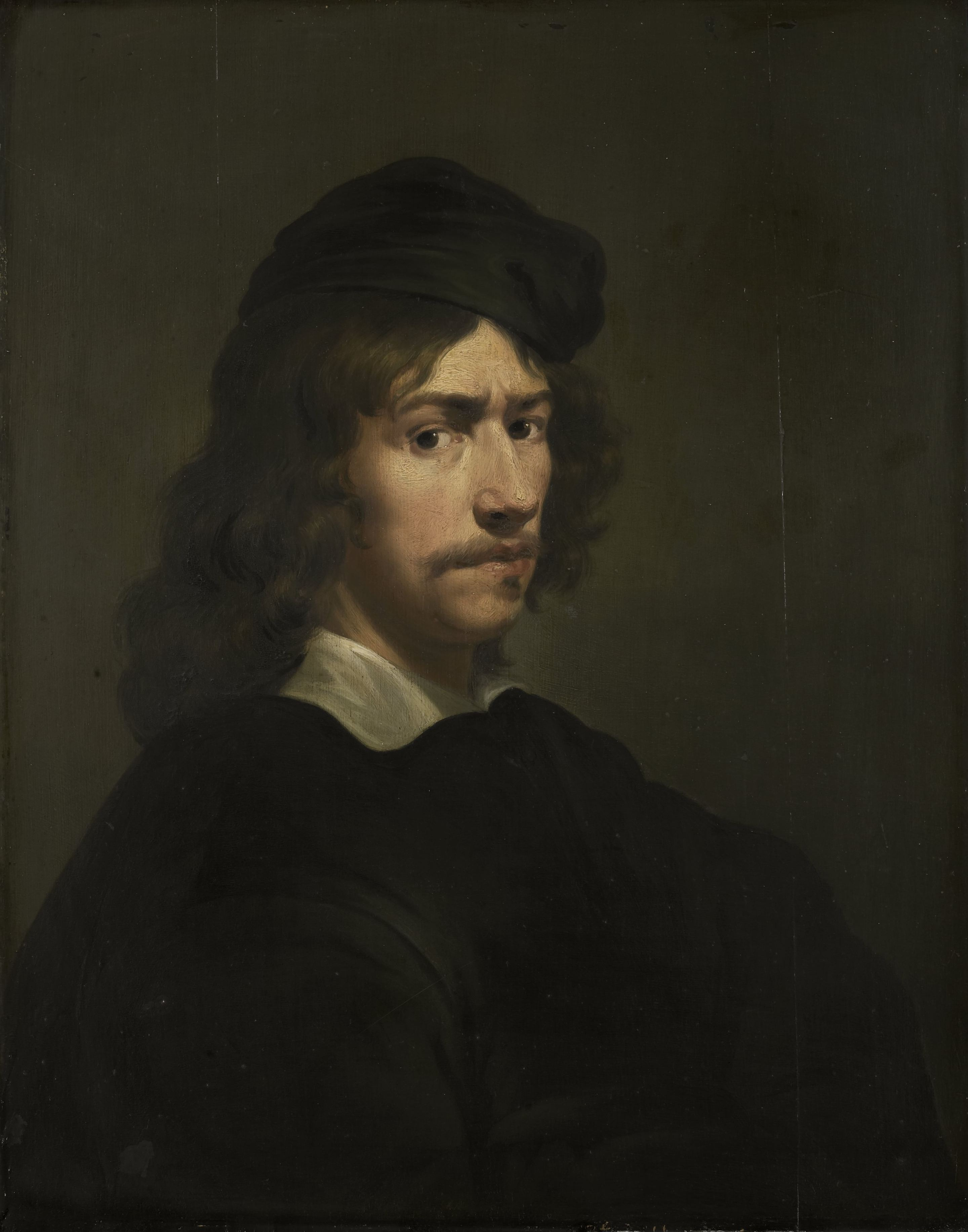
Self-portrait (date unknown)

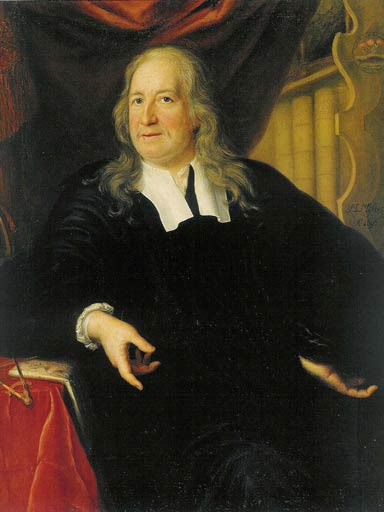
Portrait of Dr. Olaus Rudbeck (1696)

Peter Martin Mijtens the Elder, also spelled Meytens or Mytens (1648–1736), was a Dutch-Swedish painter. Trained in the Dutch Republic, he worked principally there as well.

== Biography ==
He was born at The Hague in the Dutch Republic into a family of artists. His father was Isaac Mijtens (1602-1666), the son of an art dealer and saddler from Brussels. His father and his son Martin van Meytens, known as "The Younger" were both painters. His uncle Daniël Mijtens, and his cousins Daniel Mijtens the Younger and Johannes Mytens were painters as well.

He went to Stockholm with his older brother Dietrich Mijtens (d. 1679) where his portraits were well received. In 1681, he decided to stay and shortly after was married to Johanna de Bruyn.

His earliest works were very simple compared with nobleman David Klöcker Ehrenstrahl who was the most popular portrait painter at that time. To maintain his clientele, Mijtens' works gradually became more colorful and dramatic, although it has been said that he sacrificed character.

Many of his paintings were left unsigned, which has often led to them being confused with Ehrenstrahl's work, although certain small stylistic differences can be perceived. Despite the competition from Ehrenstrahl and his nephew David von Krafft (both of whom became court painters), he earned a sufficient income to amass a significant art collection. He had several students, including Georg Desmarées and Lucas von Breda. He also trained his son, who later went to Vienna and adopted the surname "Van Meytens".

He apparently suffered from some sort of senility or insanity in his later years. He died in Stockholm during 1736. After his death, his collection was sold to Prussian diplomat Count Gustav Adolf von Gotter. Later, much of it came into the possession of Charles Eugene, Duke of Württemberg.

Posthumous criticism was harsh. Swedish diplomat Carl Gustaf Tessin called him "an old paint-spoiler" (färgskämmare). He was essentially forgotten until 1841, when his work was reevaluated by literary and art critic Nils Arfwidsson, who wrote about him in Frey, a magazine devoted to the arts and sciences.

== Other sources ==
- Boo von Malmborg (1961) Martin van Meytens d.a. - En konstnär från Sveriges storhetstid (Malmö: Allhems förlag)
- Marije Osnabrugge (2015) Netherlandish immigrant painters in Naples (1575-1654) (Dissertation - University of Amsterdam)
