= Lectionary 42 =

Lectionary ℓ 42
- New Testament manuscript
- Text: Evangelistarion
- Date: 10th-century
- Script: Greek
- Now at: Escorial
- Size: 24.5 cm by 17.5 cm

Lectionary 42, designated by siglum ℓ 42 (in the Gregory-Aland numbering). It is a Greek manuscript of the New Testament, on parchment leaves. Palaeographically it has been assigned to the 10th-century.

== Description ==
The codex contains lessons from the Gospels of John, Matthew, Luke lectionary (Evangelistarium), with lacunae at the beginning, on 224 parchment leaves (24.5 cm by 17.5 cm). The text is written in one column per page, in 20 lines per page, in Greek uncial letters. Two hands appear. The earlier leaning a little to the right.

== History ==
Formerly the manuscript belonged to Hurtado de Mendoza. It was examined by Moldenhawer, the chief librarian at the Royal Danish Library in Copenhagen 1788-1823, Emmanuel Miller, and Wilhelm Regel, Professor in Petersburg.

Currently the codex is located in the Escorial (X. III. 13) in San Lorenzo de El Escorial.

The manuscript is not cited in the critical editions of the Greek New Testament (UBS3).

One leaf of the codex with Luke 8:20-1.26-34 is housed in the Royal Danish Library in Copenhagen.

== See also ==
- List of New Testament lectionaries
- Biblical manuscript
- Textual criticism
