= Minuscule 793 =

- New Testament manuscript
- Text: Gospels
- Date: 12th century
- Script: Greek
- Now at: National Library of Greece
- Size: 18.5 cm by 15 cm
- Type: Byzantine text-type
- Category: V
- Note: –

Minuscule 793 (in the Gregory-Aland numbering), ε463 (von Soden), is a Greek minuscule manuscript of the New Testament written on parchment. Palaeographically it has been assigned to the 12th century. The manuscript has complex contents.

== Description ==
The codex contains the text of the four Gospels, on 255 parchment leaves (size 18.5 cm by 15 cm).

The text is written in one column per page, 18 lines per page.

The text is divided according to the κεφαλαια (chapters), whose numbers are given at the margin, with their τιτλοι (titles) at the top of the pages. There is no another division according to the smaller Ammonian Sections.

It contains pictures.

== Text ==
The Greek text of the codex is a representative of the Byzantine text-type. Hermann von Soden classified it to the textual family K^{x}. Aland placed it in Category V.

According to the Claremont Profile Method it represent the textual family K^{x} in Luke 1 and Luke 20. In Luke 10 no profile was made. It belongs to the textual cluster 183.

== History ==
According to C. R. Gregory the manuscript was written in the 12th century. The manuscript is currently dated by the INTF to the 12th century.

The manuscript was noticed in catalogue from 1876.

It was added to the list of New Testament manuscripts by Gregory (793). Gregory saw the manuscript in 1886.

The manuscript is now housed at the National Library of Greece (75) in Athens.

== See also ==
- List of New Testament minuscules
- Biblical manuscript
- Textual criticism
- Minuscule 792
