= Lucas von Breda =

Swedish portrait painter, art collector, and industrialist (1676–1752)

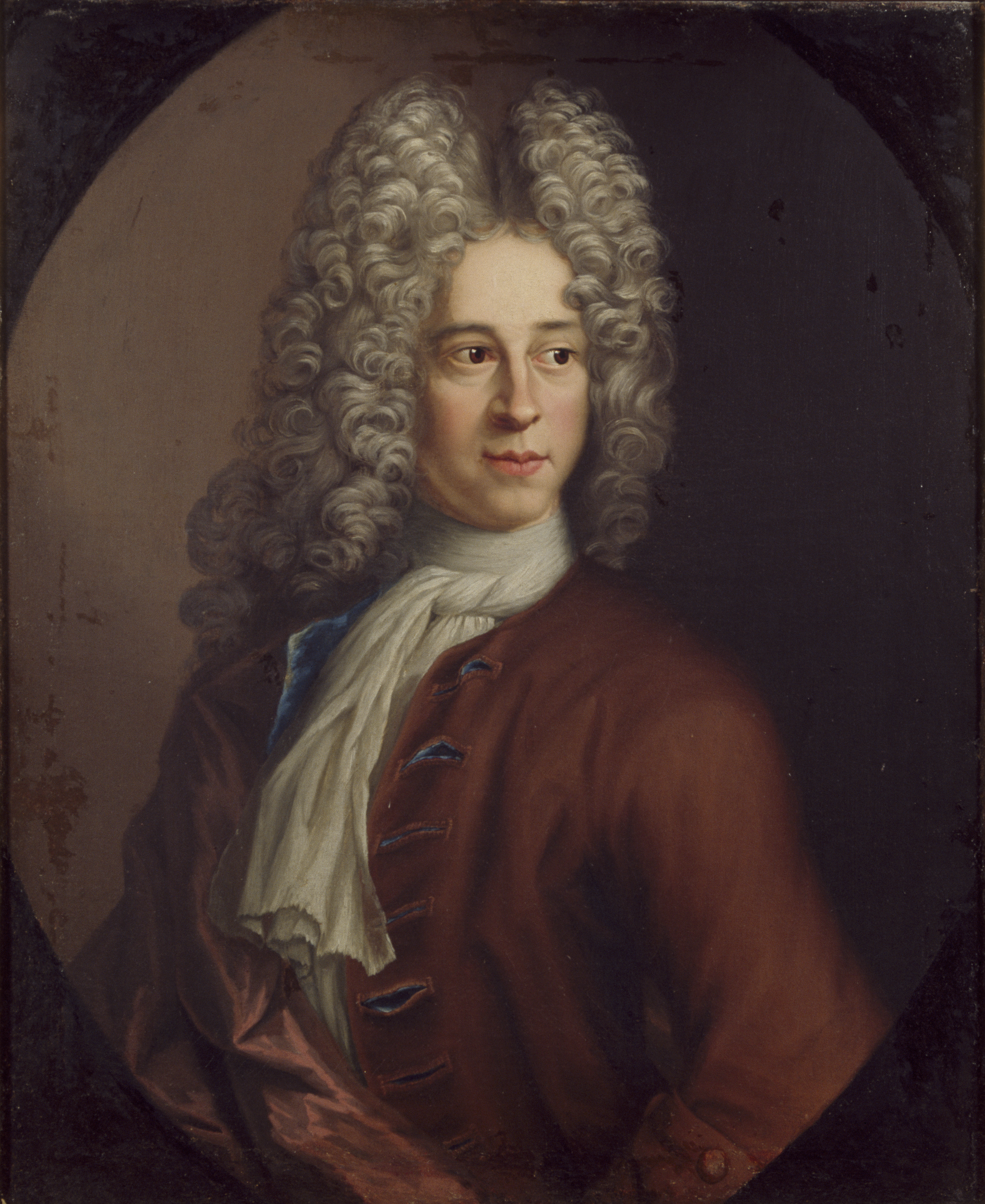
Self-portrait (date unknown)

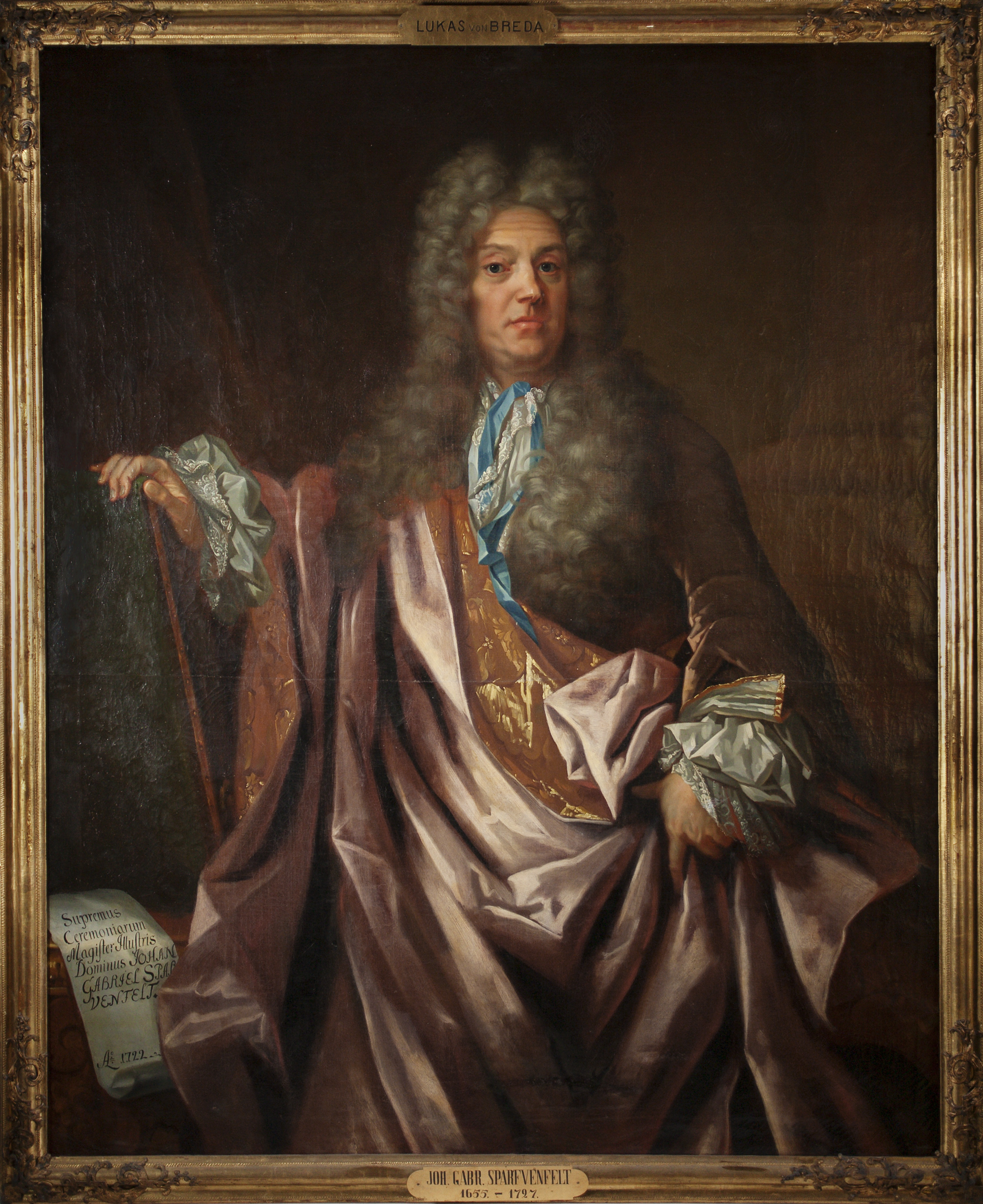
Portrait of Johan Gabriel Sparwenfeld

Lucas von Breda (18 April 1676, Stockholm - 9 April 1752, Stockholm) was a Swedish portrait painter, art collector, and industrialist. He is sometimes referred to as The Elder, to distinguish him from his son, Lucas; an insurance adjuster.

== Life and work ==
He was born to the wholesale merchant, Pieter von Breda of hamburg, whose family was originally from Brabant. Pieter and his wife, Alida née Hidding, moved to Stockholm around 1670. When Alida became a widow, in the 1690s, she arranged for Lucas to take art lessons from Martin Mijtens, with whom he was allowed to make his first foreign trip in 1697. After visiting Germany and the Netherlands, he went to Paris where, in 1704, he continued his studies with Nicolas de Largillière.

Largillière's influence was decisive, although Breda chose a different approach to color. He returned home in 1712, and quickly became a popular portraitist among the upper classes. His paintings stood out from those of his contemporaries by, among other things, a red and violet representation of skin color. He also created works with mythological motifs; notably a Venus and Adonis which was found in an art collection in Neschers.

In 1718, he married Elisabeth Buchholtz; niece of the famous architect, Carl Hårleman. His dowry from her family included a silk factory and a dyehouse. These businesses increasingly occupied more of his time, so that his painting began to suffer. After 1725, he had virtually given it up. He instead turned his attention to art collecting, laying the foundations for a gallery that his son would establish at the Nationalmuseum.

His overall production was not extensive, and the majority of his works are in private collections. His grandson, Carl Frederik von Breda, was also a portrait painter.

== Sources ==
- Gösta Lilja, Bror Olsson, Knut Andersson and S. Artur Svensson (Eds.) Svenskt konstnärslexikon (1952-1967), Part I, pp.239-240
- Gabriel Anrep, Svenska adelns Ättar-taflor (Descendants of Swedish Nobility), Gustaf Elgenstierna, Stockholm 1925
- Biographical notes from the Svenskt biografiskt handlexikon @ Project Runeberg
- Biographical notes from the Nordisk familjebok @ Project Runeberg
- Brief biography @ the Lexikonett Amanda
