= Minuscule 183 =

- New Testament manuscript
- Name: Codex Laurentianus
- Text: Gospels
- Date: 12th century
- Script: Greek
- Now at: Laurentian Library
- Size: 16.7 cm by 13.1 cm
- Type: Byzantine text-type
- Category: V
- Note: marginalia

Minuscule 183 (in the Gregory-Aland numbering), ε 221 (Soden), is a Greek minuscule manuscript of the New Testament, on parchment. Paleographically it has been assigned to the 12th century. It has marginalia.

== Description ==
The codex contains a complete text of the four Gospels on 349 parchment leaves (size 16.7 cm by 13.1 cm). The text is written in one column per page, in 24 lines per page (size of column 9.2 by 6.8 cm), in dark-brown ink, the large initial letters in gold, small initial letters in red.

The text is divided according to the κεφαλαια (chapters), whose numbers are given at the margin, with their τιτλοι (titles of chapters) at the top. There is also a division according to the smaller Ammonian Sections (in Mark 234 sections, the last in 16:9), with references to the Eusebian Canons (in gold).

It contains Eusebian Canon tables, tables of the κεφαλαια (tables of contents) before each Gospel, αναγνωσεις (lessons), pictures, synaxaria, and Menologion (added in 1418).

== Text ==
The Greek text of the codex is a representative of the Byzantine text-type. Aland placed it in Category V. Hermann von Soden included it to the textual family K^{x}. According to the Claremont Profile Method it represents textual family K^{x} in Luke 1 and Luke 20. It creates textual cluster 183. In Luke 10 no profile was made.

It creates textual cluster with minuscule 793.

== History ==
It is dated by the INTF to the 12th century.

It was examined by Birch, Scholz, and Burgon. C. R. Gregory saw the manuscript in 1886.

It is currently housed at the Laurentian Library (Plutei. VI. 14), at Florence.

== See also ==
- List of New Testament minuscules
- Biblical manuscript
- Textual criticism
