= Codex Tischendorfianus III =

Uncial 039
- New Testament manuscript
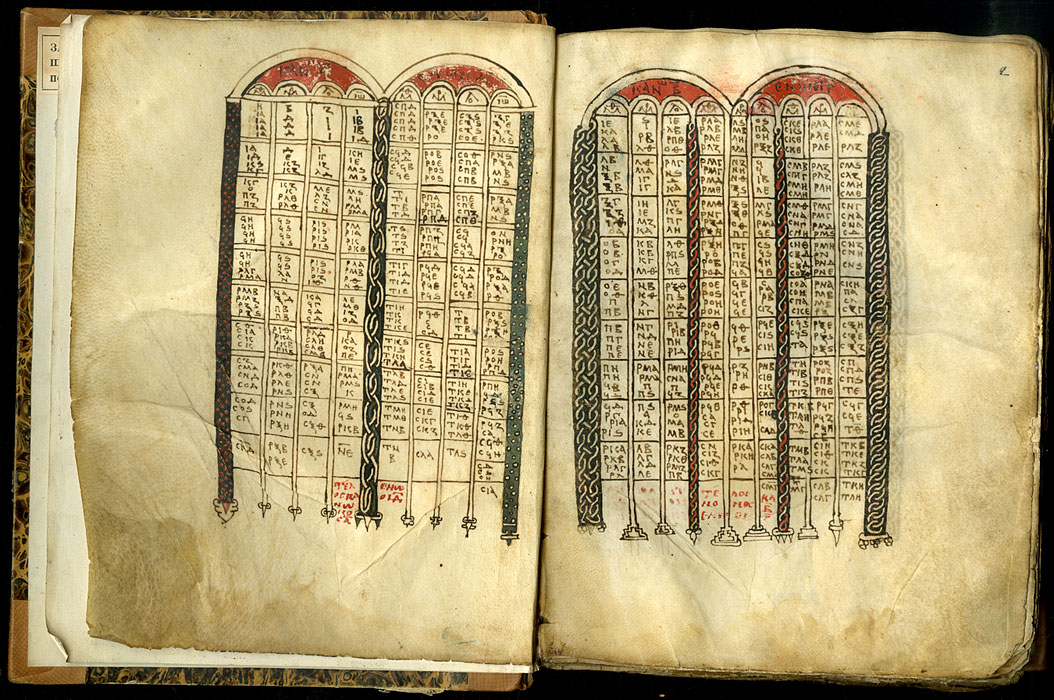
- Eusebian Canon tables on the first leaf of the original codex
- Name: Tischendorfianus III
- Sign: Λ
- Text: Gospels
- Date: 9th/10th century
- Script: Greek
- Found: 1853, Tischendorf
- Now at: Bodleian Library
- Size: 21 cm by 16.5 cm
- Type: Byzantine text-type
- Category: V

Codex Tischendorfianus III – designated by siglum Λ or 039 (in the Gregory-Aland numbering), ε 77 (von Soden) – is a Greek uncial manuscript of the Gospels on parchment. Palaeographically it has been assigned to the 9th or 10th century.

It is one of very few uncial manuscripts of the New Testament with full marginal apparatus.

The manuscript was brought from the East by Constantin von Tischendorf (hence the name of the codex), who also examined, described, and was the first scholar to collate its text. The manuscript was also examined by scholars like Samuel Prideaux Tregelles, Ernst von Dobschütz, and Gächler. It is housed in the Bodleian Library.

== Description ==
The codex contains the complete text of the Gospel of Luke and the Gospel of John on 157 parchment leaves (21 centimetres (8.3 in) by 16.5 centimetres (6.5 in)). The leaves are arranged in quarto, that is four leaves folded in quires. The text is written in two columns per page, 23 lines per page. There are no spaces between letters, and the words are not separate but written in scriptio continua. The uncial letters are small, not beautiful and slanting. The letters are characterized by Slavonic uncials. The writing is similar to that of Codex Cyprius.

It has breathings and accents, diaeresis, there is no interrogative sign. The errors of iotacism are rare, it has iota adscriptum. All errors are infrequent and it has good grammar.

It has the ornamented headpieces before each Gospel and the decorated initial letters.

The nomina sacra are written in an abbreviated way; all abbreviations are written in a usual way. In the end of each Gospel stands the Jerusalem Colophon.

The text is divided according to the κεφαλαια (chapters), whose numbers are given at the left margin of the text, and their τιτλοι (titles) at the top of the pages. The lists of the κεφαλαια are placed before each Gospel. There is also a division according to the smaller Ammonian Sections, with a references to the Eusebian Canons (in red).

It contains lectionary markings in the margin; thus the manuscript could be useful for Church reading. The marginal apparatus (marginal equipment) of the codex is full, indicating two systems of text division and lectionary directions.

It has also occasional scholia in uncials at the margin, with some critical notes.

Before Gospel of Luke stands a subscription to the Gospel of Mark.

It has Jerusalem colophon at the end of each Gospel. At the end of Matthew we read:

Gospel according to Matthew: written and corrected from the ancient manuscripts in Jerusalem: those kept in the holy mountain: in 2514 lines and 355 chapters

At the end of Mark:

Gospel according to Mark: written and corrected likewise from the carefully prepared ones in 1506 lines, 237 chapters

At the end of Luke:

Gospel according to Luke: written and corrected likewise in 2677 lines, 342 chapters

At the end of John:

Gospel according to John: written and corrected likewise from the same copies in 2210 lines, 232 chapters.

== Text ==
=== Text type ===
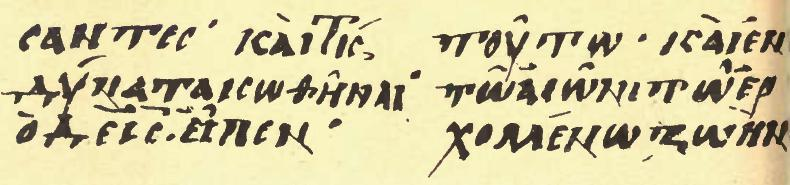
Scriveners facsimile edition with text of Luke 18:26-27

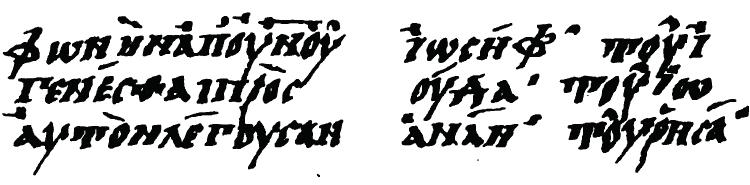
Tischendorfs facsimile edition with text of Luke 3:22.26-27

The Greek text of this codex is a representative of the Byzantine text-type, but slightly different from typical Byzantine text. It has some Caesarean readings. Tischendorf as the first found some textual affinities to the textual family today known as f^{13}. Tischendorf found its text is of the same type as the manuscripts: Basilensis, Boreelianus, Seidelianus I, Seidelianus II, Cyprius, Campianus, Vaticanus 354, Nanianus, and Mosquensis II. Hermann von Soden classified it to the textual family I^{r}. It is close to the textual family E.

Kurt Aland placed it in Category V. According to the Claremont Profile Method it represents textual family K^{x} in Luke 10 and Luke 20. In Luke 1 its text is mixed.

According to Tischendorf in John 5:1-36 in 17 places it 13 times agrees with Alexandrinus, twice with Vaticanus, one with Ephraemi, and one with G H M U V.

=== Questionable texts ===
It contains the questionable text of the Pericope Adulterae (John 7:53-8:11), but at the margin of verse 8:11 (not 7:53) it has questionable scholion: τα οβελισμενα εν τισιν αντιγραφαις ου κειται, ουδε Απολιναριου εν δε τοις αρχαις ολα μνημονευουσιν της περικοπης ταυτης και οι αποστολοι παντες εν αις εξεθεντο διαταξεσιν εις οικοδομην της εκκλησιας (Marked by an obelus in some copies, and Apollinary, one of the ancients, argued that all apostles ordered to read it for edification of the church).

It contains text of Luke 22:43-44 and John 5:4, but text of John 5:4 is marked by an obelus as a doubtful.

=== Textual variants ===
In Luke 1:28 – αυτην + ευηγγελισατο αυτην και, the reading is supported by the codices: Minuscule 164, Minuscule 199, 262, 899, 1187, 1555, and 2586.

In Luke 3:22 after γενεσθαι added phrase προς αυτον, as the codices Minuscule 13, Minuscule 69, Minuscule 119, Minuscule 229, and Minuscule 262; but phrase εξ ουρανου changed into απ ουρανου. In Luke 3:27 it reads Ancient Greek: ζορομβαβελ for ζοροβαβελ.

John 1:28 it reads Βηθεβαρα, supported by minuscule 346; Alexandrian manuscripts have βηθανια, majority of manuscripts have βηθαβαρα;

John 4:31 it reads παρεκαλουν;

John 5:1 it reads εορτη των αζυμων for εορτη των Ιουδαιων; the reading is not supported by any known Greek manuscript, or version;

In John 5:11 before word αρχην article την is omitted, as in codices: Alexandrinus, Vaticanus, Regius, Minuscule 1, Minuscule 33, and Minuscule 262;

John 5:12 it has εμεινεν for εμειναν as in codices A F G 1 124;

John 5:24 reads επιστευσεν for επιστευεν as in minuscule 235;

John 5:36 reads μειζων for μειζω.

In John 8:7 and in 8:10 it reads αναβλεψας instead of ανακυψας, the readings are supported by the manuscripts: Codex Nanianus (only in 8:7), textual family f^{13}, and 700;

In John 8:10 it reads Ιησους ειδεν αυτην και along with Codex Nanianus, f^{13}, 225, 700, 1077, 1443, Lectionary 185^{mg}, Ethiopic mss. Majority of the manuscripts read: Ιησους και μηδενα θεασαμενος πλην της γυναικος or: Ιησους.

In John 8:57 it has singular reading τεσσερακοντα (forty) instead of πεντηκοντα (fifty).

=== Group Λ ===
It creates textual group Λ. The group was identified and described by Hermann von Soden, who designated it by I^{r}. Soden considered it the most diluted form of the Iota text-type, being about nine parts Kappa to one part Iota. According to von Soden it is not an important group and has a little significance for the reconstruction of the original text of the New Testament. The early date of some its members places the origin of the group in or before the 9th century. According to Wisse the group is fairly close to K^{x}.

According to the Claremont Profile Method it has the following profile:

Luke 1: 6, 8, (9), 22, (28), (29), 34, (36), (41).
Luke 10: 3, 15, 18, 23, 33, 35, 44, 57.
Luke 20: 4, 13, 17, 19, 32, 35, 39, 54, 55, 57, 62.

The word before the bracket is the reading of the UBS edition. The reading after bracket are the reading of the manuscript. The readings which are not bold are those of the Textus Receptus.

- Luke 1:10 — ην του λαου ] του λαου ην
- Luke 1:14 — γενεσει ] γεννεσει
- Luke 1:15 — του ] omit
- Luke 1:26 — Ναζαρεθ ] Ναζαρετ
- Luke 1:34 — εσται ] εσται μοι
- Luke 1:35 — γεννωμενον ] γεννωμενον εκ του
- Luke 1:44 — εν αγαλλιασει το βρεφος ] το βρεφος εν αγαλλιασει
- Luke 1:50 — γενεας και γενεας ] γενεαν και γενεαν; Textus Receptus reads: γενεας και γενεαν
- Luke 1:61 — εκ της συγγενειας ] εν τη συγγενεια
- Luke 10:1 — ημελλεν ] εμελλεν
- Luke 10:6 — εαν ] εαν μεν
- Luke 10:8 — ην ] δ'
- Luke 10:12 — λεγω ] λεγω δε
- Luke 10:17 — εβδομηκοντα ] εβδομηκοντα μαθηται
- Luke 10:21 — αυτη ] αυτη δε
- Luke 10:30 — εκδυσαντες ] εξεδυσαν
- Luke 10:36 — πλησιον δοκει σοι ] δοκει σοι πλησιον
- Luke 20:1 — αρχιερεις ] ιερεις
- Luke 20:5 — δια τι ] πας ο λαος
- Luke 20:7 — ποθεν ] 'omit
- Luke 20:9 — τις ] omit
- Luke 20:18 — επ ] εις
- Luke 20:19 — τον λαον ] omit
- Luke 20:22 — φορον ] φορους
- Luke 20:31 — ωσαυτως ] ωσαυτως ως αυτως
- Luke 20:31 — επτα ] επτα και
- Luke 20:32 — υστερον ] υστερον παντων
- Luke 20:35 — γαμιζονται ] εκγαμιζονται (Τextus Receptus reads: εκγαμισκονται).

According to Frederick Wisse following 23 manuscripts belong to this group in at least a part of Luke: 039, 161, 164, 166, 173 (Luke 20), 174, 199, 211, 230, 262, 710 (Luke 20), 899, 1187, 1205, 1301 (Luke 20), 1502 (Luke 20), 1555, 1573, (Luke 10 and 20), 2465, 2585 (Luke 1 and 20) 2586, and 2725 (Luke 20).

== History ==
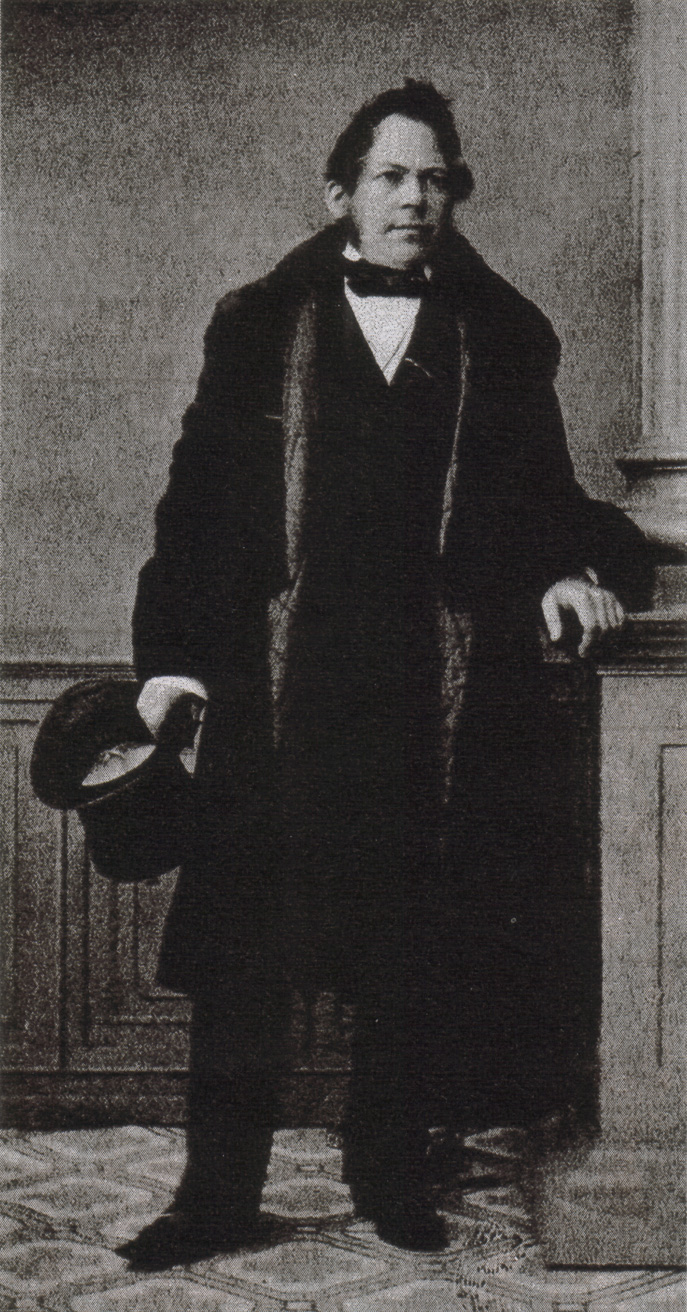
Tischendorf – discoverer and editor of the codex

Scrivener and Tischendorf dated the manuscript to the 8th century, Gregory to the 9th century. In the present time the manuscript has been assigned on palaeographical grounds to the 9th century or to the 10th century. The 8th century is also possible palaeographically, but it is excluded by full marginal equipment, breathings and accents.

The place of origin is still speculative. According to Gregory it is possible that the manuscript was written and corrected in Jerusalem. It is very difficult to prove, but Palestine is still shown as one of the possible places. Nothing is known of the early history of the codex until its discovery by Tischendorf in 1853.

Formerly it was bounded with the codex 566 in one manuscript. 556 contains Gospel of Matthew and Gospel of Mark, it is written in minuscule letters. The two parts of the manuscript agree in form (two columns, 23 lines per column), in signatures, in the writing of the scholia, and text-type. The marginal notes are written in the same small uncial letters. The nomina sacra are abbreviated in the same way. Also errors (e.g. itacisms, N ephelkystikon, iota adscriptum, no iota subscriptum etc.) are of the same kind. It is sure that these two parts were written by the same hand. Alfred Rahlfs noted that codex E of the Septuagint was also written partly in uncials and partly in minuscules, in the ninth or tenth century when the change from one style of writing to the other was taking place.

The codex was held at Saint Catherine's Monastery on Mount Sinai in Egypt and was found by Constantin von Tischendorf in 1853, who took away only the uncial text (Luke-John) — along with Codex Tischendorfianus IV — and brought it to the Bodleian Library in Oxford, where it is now located. Formerly it was housed under the shelf number "Misc. 310", but is now under shelf number "Auctarium T. infr 1.1". It is one of the popular attractions for visitors to the Bodleian Library.

Tischendorf published his description of the minuscule part of the codex in 1860. In 1861 Tischendorf carried out a new examination of the entire codex, with detailed attention to Luke 3:19-36 and John 5:1-36.

The text of the codex was later collated by Tischendorf and Tregelles. Tischendorf used its text in 1858 in his edition of the Novum Testamentum Graece et Latine and in every later edition of the text of the New Testament. In the present day it is infrequently quoted in editions of Nestle-Aland Novum Testamentum Graece (UBS4, NA27).

Tischendorf removed the minuscule text in 1859. It is now housed in the National Library of Russia in Saint Petersburg.

P. Gächler in 1934 found some textual similarities between the manuscript and Codex Bezae, which represents the Western text.

== See also ==
- List of New Testament uncials
- Textual criticism
