= Minuscule 441 =

- New Testament manuscript
- Text: Acts of the Apostles, Pauline epistles †
- Date: 13th century
- Script: Greek
- Now at: University of Uppsala
- Size: 23 cm by 17 cm
- Category: III

Minuscule 441 (in the Gregory-Aland numbering), O^{18} (in the Soden numbering), is a Greek minuscule manuscript of the New Testament, on parchment. Palaeographically it has been assigned to the 13th century. Its former designations were 68^{a} and 73^{p}.

== Description ==
The codex contains the text of the Acts 8:14 to 1 Corinthians 15:38 on 90 parchment leaves (23 cm by 17 cm). It does not contain any of the Catholic epistles. It is written in one column of 38-39 lines per page.

It contains the Euthalian Apparatus, subscriptions at the end of each book, and στιχοι. The biblical text is surrounded by a catena of Oecumenius.

Some of leaves of the codex are in disorder. The order of leaves: 3-18. 1. 2. 19-46. 47-58. 59. 63. 64. 59. 60-62. 73. 74. 65. 66. 69-72. 67. 68. 75-78. 127-142. 79-126. 143-158. 167-182. 159-166.

Leaves 183-440 of the same codex formerly belonged to another manuscript. They have now been bound together. These leaves have a duplicate portion (1 Corinthians 13:6-15:38) and some contradictory readings. Now they are classified as Minuscule 442.

== Text ==
The Greek text of the codex is mixed. Aland placed it in Category III.

== History ==
The manuscript was bought at Venice by Sparwenfeldt in 1678. It was examined by Belsheim. C. R. Gregory saw it in 1891.

The manuscript was added to the list of the New Testament manuscripts by Scholz (1794-1852).

Formerly it was labelled by 68^{a} and 73^{p}. In 1908 Gregory gave the number 441 to it.

It is currently housed at the University of Uppsala (Gr. 1, p. 3-182) in Uppsala.

== See also ==
- List of New Testament minuscules
- Biblical manuscript
- Textual criticism
