= Minuscule 718 =

- New Testament manuscript
- Text: Gospels †
- Date: 14th century
- Script: Greek
- Now at: Gonville and Caius College, Cambridge
- Size: 16.3 cm by 12.5 cm
- Type: Byzantine text-type
- Category: V
- Note: –

Minuscule 718 (in the Gregory-Aland numbering), ε352 (von Soden), is a Greek minuscule manuscript of the New Testament, on parchment. Palaeographically it has been assigned to the 14th century. The manuscript is lacunose. Scrivener labelled it as 736^{e}.

== Description ==
The codex contains the text of the four Gospels, on 254 parchment leaves (size 16.3 cm by 12.5 cm), with some lacunae. The text of John 18:39-21:25 was supplied by a later hand.

The text is written in one columns per page, 24 lines per page. The text is divided according to the κεφαλαια (chapters), whose numbers are given at the margin of the text and their τιτλοι (titles) are given at the top. The text is also divided according to the smaller Ammonian Sections (in Mark 234 Sections, the last section in 16:15), which numbers are given at the margin, but without references to the Eusebian Canons. A references to the Eusebian Canons were added by a later hand, but only at the beginning of Matthew.

The manuscript contains hypotheses, lists of the κεφαλαια (tables of contents) before each Gospel. It contains lectionary markings, incipits (beginning of church lessons marked), Synaxarion, Menologion, and subscriptions (Jerusalem Colophon).

It contains many marginal notes.

== Text ==
The Greek text of the codex is a representative of the Byzantine text-type. Kurt Aland placed it in Category V.

According to the Claremont Profile Method it represents textual family K^{x} in Luke 1 and Luke 10. In Luke 20 it represents Πa.

The readings are sometimes curious.

== History ==
Scrivener dated the manuscript to the 11th or 12th century, Dean Burgon to the 12th century, Gregory dated it to the 14th century. Currently the manuscript is dated by the INTF to the 14th century.

The manuscript was bought from book dealer Muller, in London.

It was added to the list of New Testament manuscripts by Scrivener (736) and Gregory (718). Gregory saw the manuscript in 1883. The text was collated by H. B. Swete.

At present the manuscript is housed at the Conville and Caius (MS 781/819) in Cambridge.

== See also ==
- List of New Testament minuscules
- Biblical manuscript
- Textual criticism
