= Minuscule 229 =

- New Testament manuscript
- Name: Codex Escurialensis
- Text: Gospels
- Date: 1140
- Script: Greek
- Now at: Escurial
- Size: 14.2 cm by 11 cm
- Category: none

Minuscule 229 (in the Gregory-Aland numbering), ε 1206 (Soden), is a Greek minuscule manuscript of the New Testament, on parchment. It is dated by a colophon to 1140.

== Description ==
The codex contains the text of the four Gospels with two lacunae (Mark 16:16-20; John 1:1-11), on 297 parchment leaves (size 14.2 cm by 11 cm). The leaves are arranged in octavo (eight leaves in quire). The text is written in one column per page, 21 lines per page.

It contains pictures and subscriptions at the end of each Gospel. Many corrections were made in the 14th century.

According to Kurt Aland, German theologian and biblical scholar, the Greek text of the codex did not place in any Category. According to the Claremont Profile Method it represents textual family Π^{a} in Luke 1. In Luke 10 and Luke 20 it represents family K^{x}.

== History ==
According to the colophon it was: Ετελειωθη το παρων βιβλιον δια χειρος βασιλειου νοταριου του Αργυροπουλου μηνι ιαννουαριω εις α. Νυ του ςχμ ετους.

The manuscript was written by Basilius, a notary from Argyropolis, in 1140. In the 14th century someone corrected text of the codex in many places.

It was described by Daniel Gotthilf Moldenhawer, who collated it about 1783 for Andreas Birch (Esc. 8). Emmanuel Miller described it very briefly in 1848.

It is currently housed at the Escurial (Cod. Escurialensis, X. IV. 21).

== See also ==
- List of New Testament minuscules
- Biblical manuscript
- Textual criticism
