= Otto Weinreich =

German philologist (1886–1972)

- Born: Otto Karl Weinreich; 13 March 1886
- Died: 26 March 1972 (aged 86)

Otto Karl Weinreich (13 March 1886 – 26 March 1972) was a German classical philologist. He is noted for his study of the Lukan Befreiungswunder through his work Gebet und Wunder.

Weinrich's works were focused on the so-called liberation miracles such as the miracles of the Dionysian "circles" (e.g. Dionysos' prison escape in the Euripides' play Bacchae). The miracles also included the miraculous escape of Moses; two liberations in the text Life of Apollonius of Tyana; and, the divine deliverances in the New Testament's Acts. He was also one of the editors of the Archiv für Religionswissenschaft (ARW).
