= Minuscule 199 =

- New Testament manuscript
- Name: Codex S. Mariae
- Text: Matthew
- Date: 12th century
- Script: Greek
- Now at: Laurentian Library
- Size: 14.2 cm by 11.9 cm
- Type: Byzantine text-type
- Category: V
- Note: marginalia

Minuscule 199 (in the Gregory-Aland numbering), ε 1254 (Soden), is a Greek minuscule manuscript of the New Testament, on parchment. Palaeographically it has been assigned to the 12th century. It has complex contents and full marginalia.

== Description ==
The codex contains a complete text of the four Gospels on 229 parchment leaves (size 14.2 cm by 11.9 cm). The text is written in one column per page, in 27 lines per page (10 by 8 cm), in dark-brown ink, capital letters in gold.

The text is divided according to the κεφαλαια (chapters), whose numbers are given at the margin, and the τιτλοι (titles of chapters) at the top of the pages. There is also a division according to the Ammonian Sections (in Mark 234 Sections, the last 16:9), with references to the Eusebian Canons (written below Ammonian Section numbers, with a harmony).

It contains the Eusebian tables, tables of the κεφαλαια (tables of contents) before each Gospel, with iambic verses, subscriptions at the end of each Gospel, with numbers of Verses, numbers of scholia, numbers of στιχοι, and pictures.

== Text ==
The Greek text of the codex is a representative of the Byzantine text-type. Aland placed it in Category V.

== History ==
The manuscript was presented by Antonio Corbinelli († 1423) to the Benedictine library of S. Maria monastery.

Birch and Dean Burgon examined this codex. C. R. Gregory saw it in 1886.

It is currently housed at the Laurentian Library (Conv. Sopp. 160), at Florence.

== See also ==
- List of New Testament minuscules
- Biblical manuscript
- Textual criticism
