= Minuscule 1187 =

- New Testament manuscript
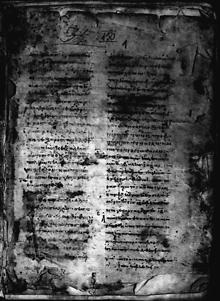
- Folio 1 recto
- Text: Gospels
- Date: 11th century
- Script: Greek
- Now at: Saint Catherine's Monastery
- Size: 23.5 cm by 18.5 cm
- Type: Byzantine
- Category: V
- Note: marginalia

Minuscule 1187 (in the Gregory-Aland numbering), ε 1083 (von Soden), is an 11th-century Greek minuscule manuscript of the New Testament on parchment. It has marginalia. The manuscript has survived in complete condition. It is housed in the Saint Catherine's Monastery.

== Description ==
The codex contains complete text of the four Gospels, on 307 parchment leaves (size 23.5 cm by 18.5 cm), without any lacuna. The text is written in two columns per page, 25 lines per page.

The text of the Gospels is divided according to the κεφαλαια (chapters), whose numbers are given at the margin, and their τιτλοι (titles of chapters) at the top of the pages. It has subscriptions at the end of each Gospel, with so called Jerusalem Colophon. According to Hermann von Soden the manuscript was prepared for liturgical reading.

It contains some scholia from Epiphanius of Salamis and John Chrysostom.

== Text ==
The Greek text of the codex is a representative of the Byzantine. Hermann von Soden classified it to the textual family I^{r}. Kurt Aland placed it in Category V.

According to the Claremont Profile Method it represents Λ group in Luke 1, Luke 10, and Luke 20. The leading manuscript of this group is Codex Tischendorfianus III.

The text of the Pericope Adulterae (John 7:53-8:11) is marked at the margin by an obelus (÷) as doubtful.

== History ==
According to Victor Gardthausen it was written in the 10th or 11th century. Kondakov dated it to the 12th or 13th century. Currently the manuscript is dated by the INTF to the 11th century. Of the history of the codex 1187 nothing is known until the year 1886, when it was seen by Victor Gardthausen, German palaeographer. Gardthausen was first western scholar, who described the codex. The first facsimile of the codex was published by William Hatch in 1932.

The manuscript was added to the list of New Testament manuscripts by Gregory (as 1187^{e}) on the basis of Gardthausen's description. It was not on the Scrivener's list, but it was added to his list by Edward Miller in the 4th edition of A Plain Introduction to the Criticism of the New Testament.

It is not cited in critical editions of the Greek New Testament (UBS4, NA28).

The manuscript is housed at the Saint Catherine's Monastery (Gr. 150), in Sinai Peninsula.

== See also ==
- List of New Testament minuscules (1001–2000)
- Biblical manuscript
- Textual criticism
