= Minuscule 728 =

- New Testament manuscript
- Text: Gospels
- Date: 14th century
- Script: Greek
- Now at: Bibliothèque nationale de France
- Size: 30.3 cm by 21.5 cm
- Type: –
- Category: none
- Note: –

Minuscule 728 (in the Gregory-Aland numbering), Θ^{ε412} (von Soden), is a Greek minuscule manuscript of the New Testament written on parchment. Palaeographically it has been assigned to the 14th century. The manuscript has complex contents. Scrivener labelled it as 746^{e}.

== Description ==
The codex contains a complete text of the four Gospels on 231 parchment leaves (size 30.3 cm by 21.5 cm), without any lacunae.

The text is written in two columns per page, 60-68 lines per page.

The text is divided according to the κεφαλαια (chapters), with their τιτλοι (titles of chapters) at the top of the pages. There is also a division according to the smaller Ammonian Sections, but without references to the Eusebian Canons.

It contains Prolegomena, lists of the κεφαλαια (tables of contents), subscriptions at the end of the Gospels, numbers of στιχοι, Synaxarion, lectionary markings at the margin, and pictures. It has a commentary of Theophylact.

== Text ==
Kurt Aland did not place the Greek text of the codex in any Category.

It was not examined by using the Claremont Profile Method.

== History ==
Scrivener dated the manuscript to the 13th century, Gregory dated it to the 14th century. The manuscript is currently dated by the INTF to the 14th century.

It was added to the list of New Testament manuscripts by Scrivener (746) and Gregory (728). It was examined and described by Paulin Martin. Gregory saw the manuscript in 1885.

The manuscript is now housed at the Bibliothèque nationale de France (Gr. 181) in Paris.

== See also ==
- List of New Testament minuscules
- Biblical manuscript
- Textual criticism
