= Bertrand Hemmerdinger =

French historian (1921–2017)

Albert Bertrand Hemmerdinger (1 October 1921 – 19 January 2017) was a French historian who specialised in ancient history.

== Bibliography ==
- 1955: Essai sur l'histoire du texte de Thucydide, Paris, Les Belles Lettres,
- 1963: Les livres ternaires des Alexandrins, Brussels,
- 1964: La culture grecque classique du VIIème au IXème siècle, Brussels,
- 1965: La prétendue manus Philodemi, Paris,
- 1965: Le "Codex" 252 de la Bibliothèque de Photius,
- 1965: Note sur deux fragments grecs de Saint Irénée,
- 1965: Nadar et Jules Verne,
- 1965: Contre les hérésies : édition critique d'après les versions arménienne et latine - Irénée de Lyon, Paris, Ed. du Cerf,
- 1966: Le Parisinus de Lucrèce, Wiesbaden, F. Steiner,
- 1966: Les Lettres latines à Constantinople jusqu'à Justinien, Amsterdam, A. M. Hakkert,
- 1966: Observations critiques sur Irénée, IV (Sources chrétiennes 100) ou les mésaventures d'un philologue, Oxford, Clarendon press,
- 1967: Le "De plantis" de Nicolas de Damas à Planude, Berlin,
- 1970: De la Méconnaissance de quelques étymologies grecques, Göttingen, Vanden-Hoeck und Ruprecht,
- 1970: Comptes de chasseurs d'éléphants, Leipzig, Teubner,
- 1981: Les Manuscrits d'Hérodote et la critique verbale, Genova, Istituto di filologia classica e medievale,
- 1982: Que les habitants de Byblos portèrent en Grèce le papyrus égyptien et l'écriture phénicienne,
- 1982: Réflexions sur les divers génies du peuple romain, de Charles de Saint-Evremond, Naples, Jovene,
- 1984: Pseudo-Xénophon, Roma, Accademia nazionale dei Lincei,
- 1984: Précis des guerres de César écrit par Marchand à l'île Sainte-Hélène sous la dictée de l'Empereur Napoléon, Naples, Jovene,
- 1986: Commentaire de l'"Économie politique des Romains" et de la "Climatologie comparée de l'Italie et de l'Andalousie anciennes et modernes",
- 1992: Montesquieu et Frédéric le grand, Torino, Rosemberg e Sellier,
