= Titus of Bostra =

Syrian bishop

Titus of Bostra (died c. 378) was a Christian theologian and bishop.

== Life ==
Sozomen names Titus among the great men of the time of Constantius. He also tells of a mean trick played upon Titus by Julian the Apostate. It was expected that the reestablishment of paganism would cause riots, as it had elsewhere. Julian wrote to Titus, as bishop of Bostra (now Bosra) that he would hold him and the clergy responsible for any disorder. Titus replied that though the Christians were equal in number to the pagans they would obey him and keep quiet. Julian then wrote to the Bostrians urging them to expel Titus because he had calumniated them by attributing their quiet conduct not to their own good dispositions but to his influence. Titus remained bishop at Bostra until c. 371.

According to Socrates, Titus was one of the bishops who signed the Synodal Letter, addressed to Jovian by the Council of Antioch (363), in which the Nicene Creed was accepted, though with a clause "intended somewhat to weaken and semiarianize the expression homoousios".

== Works ==
St. Jerome names Titus among writers whose secular erudition is as marvellous as their knowledge of Scripture: in his De Viris Illustribus, cii, he speaks of Titus's "mighty" books against the Manichaean and other miscellanea. He places his death under Valens.

Of the other miscellanea, only fragments of exegetical writings have survived. These show that Titus followed the Antiochene School of Scripture exegesis in keeping to the literal as opposed to the allegorical interpretation.

Titus's Contra Manichæos preserves a large number of quotations from Manichaean writers. The work consists of four books of which the fourth and the greater part of the third are only extant in a Syriac translation. The Greek and Syriac texts of the Contra Manichæos were published by Paul de Lagarde (Berlin, 1859). Earlier editions of the Greek text suffer from an insertion from a work of Serapion owing to the misplacement of a leaf in the original codex. The latest edition by Paul-Huber Poirier of the extant Greek text and the more extensive Syriac translation appeared 2013 (Corpus Christianorum Series Graeca 82). In 2015 a French translation of the texts in this edition appeared in the Corpus Christianorum in Translation-series.

In one passage Titus seems to favour Origen's view that the pains of the damned are not eternal.

A Commentary on the Gospel of St. Luke is attributed to Titus, which survives in excerpts principally in catenae. For this, and other writings attributed to Titus see Migne and Gallandi. The genuine exegetical fragments of this commentary were published by Sickenberger.
