= Minuscule 20 =

Coordinates: 48°50′0.8″N 2°22′32.8″E

- New Testament manuscript
- Text: Gospels
- Date: 11th-century
- Script: Greek
- Found: 1669
- Now at: National Library of France
- Size: 33.6 cm by 23.3 cm
- Type: Byzantine text-type
- Category: V
- Hand: carelessly written
- Note: marginalia

Minuscule 20 (in the Gregory-Aland numbering), A^{138} (Soden). It is a Greek minuscule manuscript of the New Testament, dated paleographically to the 11th-century. The manuscript has complex contents and full marginalia. It was prepared for the church reading.

== Description ==
The codex contains a complete text of the four Gospels on 274 thick parchment leaves (33.6 cm by 23.3 cm). The text is written in 1 column per page, biblical text in 36 lines per page, text of commentary in 51 lines per page. According to F. H. A. Scrivener it is carelessly written.

The text is divided according to the κεφαλαια (chapters), whose numbers are given at the margin, and their τιτλοι (titles of chapters) at the top of the pages. There is also another division according to the Ammonian Sections, with references to the Eusebian Canons (written below Ammonian Section numbers).

It contains tables of the κεφαλαια (tables of contents) before each of the Gospels, lectionary markings at the margin (for liturgical use), subscriptions at the end of each of the Gospels, numbers of στιχοι, pictures, and catenae. It has the commentaries of (Chrysostomos in Matthew, Luke, and John, Victorinus in Mark). It contains the famous Jerusalem Colophon.

The text of the Pericope Adulterae (John 7:53-8:11) is placed at the end Gospel of John, after 21:25.

== Text ==
The Greek text of the codex according to Aland is a representative of the Byzantine text-type, but according to David Alan Black of the Alexandrian text-type. Aland placed it in Category V.

It was not examined by using the Claremont Profile Method. Possibly it is a mixture of text types.

== History ==
The manuscript is dated by the INTF to the 11th-century.

The codex was brought from the East in 1669. It was added to the list of the New Testament manuscripts by J. J. Wettstein, who gave it the number 20. It was collated by Scholz and W. F. Rose. It was examined and described by Paulin Martin. C. R. Gregory saw the manuscript in 1885.

It is currently housed at the Bibliothèque nationale de France (Gr. 188) at Paris.

== See also ==
- Minuscule 21
- Minuscule 19
- List of New Testament minuscules
- Textual criticism
