= Johan Gabriel Sparwenfeld =

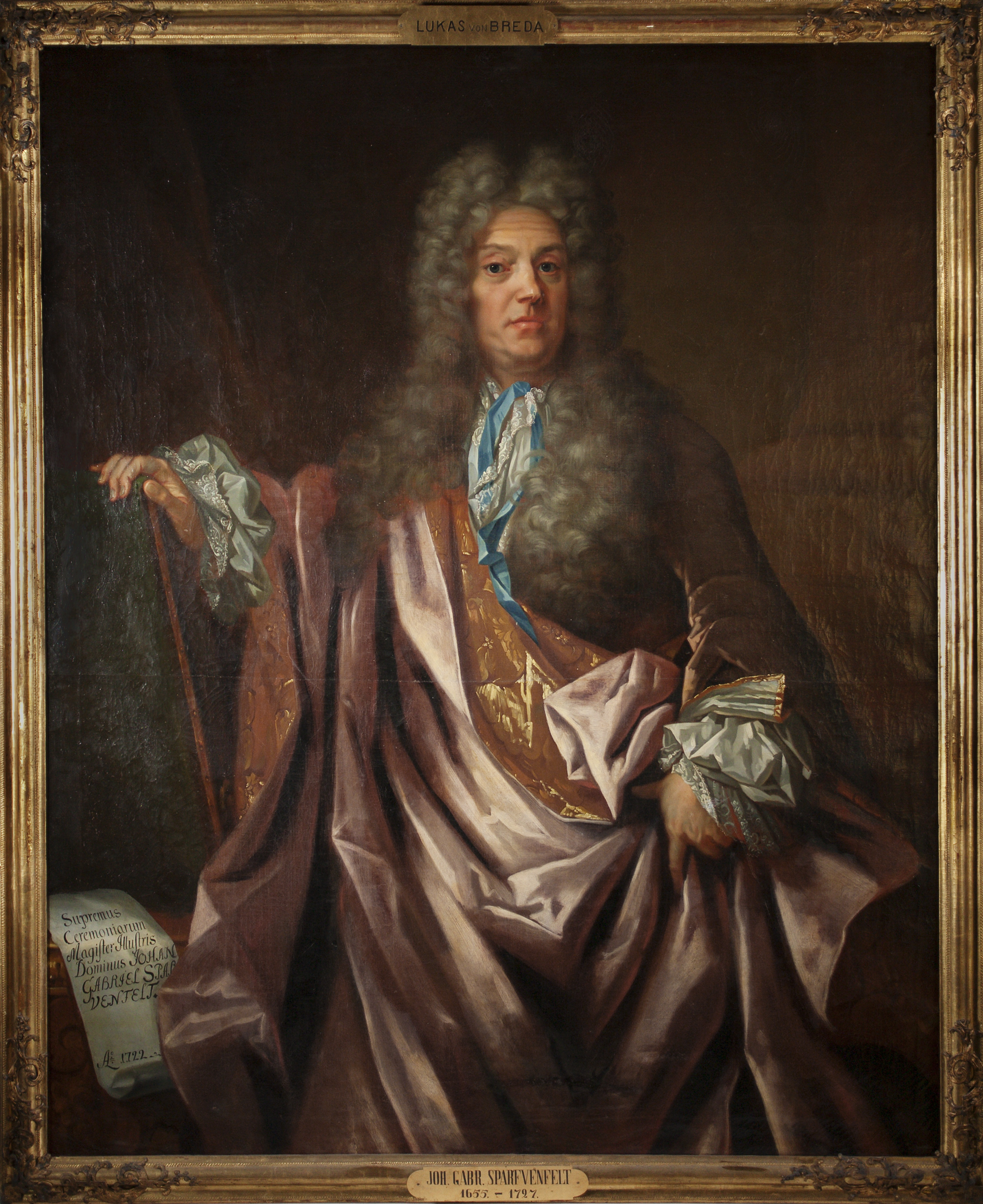
- Johan Gabriel Sparwenfeld, portrait by Lucas von Breda (1722).
- Born: 17 July 1655; Åmål, Sweden
- Died: 2 June 1727 (aged 71); Åbylund, Sweden
- Noble family: Sparwenfeld
- Occupation: Linguist; Master of ceremonies Diplomat; Diarist

Johan Gabriel Sparwenfeld (Latin: Ioannes Gabriel Sparvenfeldius; (17 July, 1655 – 2 June, 1727) was a 17th-century Swedish diplomat, linguist, polyglot and diarist.

== Biography ==
Johan Gabriel Sparwenfeld was born to Johan Sparwenfeld (1618–1698) and Christina Uggla. Sparwenfeld began his studies at the age of eight in Uppsala. Some researchers believe that he studied law, history and languages. And after he had finished studying Sparwenfeld went to search for old Swedish manuscripts in The Netherlands, France and Italy.

In 1674, he was brought by his uncle, admiral Claes Uggla, on a voyage to the Duchy of Holstein. And during the Scanian War (1675–1679) he was captured and brought to England when a Danish corsair caused the ship to sink. It was not until three years later that he was given permission to return to Sweden.

In 1684, Sparwenfeld was sent to the Swedish embassy in Moscow. It was during this time that he wrote his diary portraying life and culture in Russia. During his visit to Russia, Sparwenfeld became interested in Slavic languages, he began to learn Russian and did so really well. He later started with lexicographical studies in Slavic languages and held on to that work for almost 20 years. His work later made him publish the Lexicon Slavonicum.

Sparwenfeld had a strong interest in Arabic. He is known to have acquired the Barthélémy d'Herbelots Bibliothéque Ori-entale in 1697 from Paris. In which several notes had been made by him showing his interest and knowledge in Arabic. Sparwenfeld had a special interest in Syrian Arabic.

Sparwenfeld is known to have been able to speak 14 languages. Including Spanish, Arabic, Latin, Russian and Greek.

== Personal life ==
Sparwenfeld married Antoinetta Sophia Hildebrand in 1695. In the following eight years, Sparwenfeld and Hildebrand had a total of eight children.

== In popular culture ==
In September 2020 Sparwenfeld and his estate Åbylund in the parish of Romfartuna in Sweden were depicted in the SVT-series Det sitter I väggarna.

== Publications ==
- Lexicon Slavonicum
- J.G. Sparwenfeld's diary of a journey to Russia (1684–1687)
- Sparwenfeld's Map of Siberia

Honorary titles
Preceded by	Master of ceremonies to the King of Sweden; 1701–1712	Succeeded by
