= Andreas Birch =

Danish academic

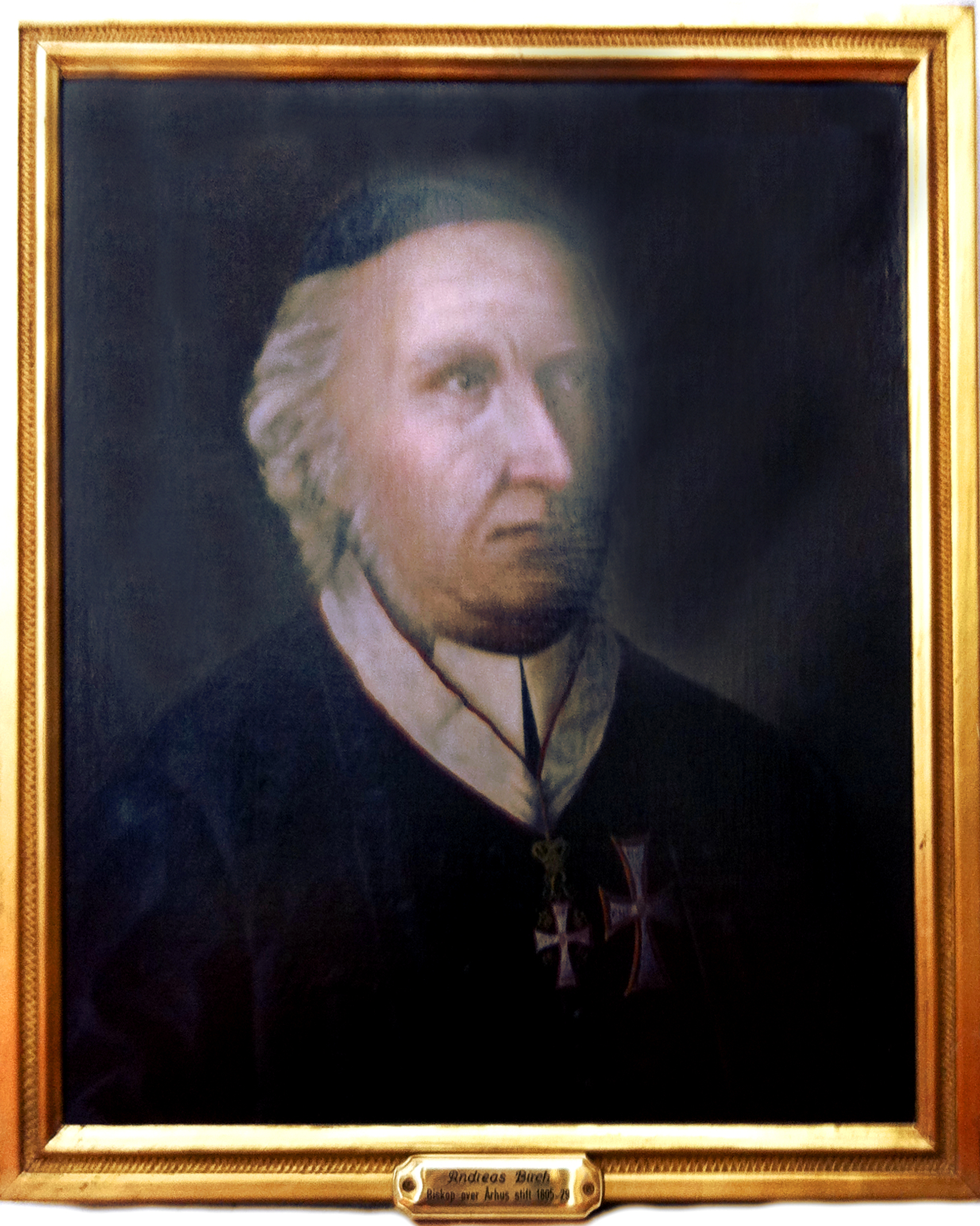
Andreas Birch as Bishop

Andreas Birch (November 6, 1758 – October 25, 1829) was a professor from Copenhagen. Birch was sent in 1781–1783 by the king of Denmark, Christian VII, to examine manuscripts in Italy, Germany, and other European countries.

== Life ==
Birch had a difficult experience at the age of 4 when in one month he lost both of his parents. His uncle, brewer A. T. Gardenholtz, took care of him, however, and by the year 1774, he was a student. Five years later he finished his theological studies in Copenhagen and travelled to Göttingen to continue his theological and philological studies under the guidance of Johann David Michaelis' and Christian Gottlob Heyne. Michaelis, who had big expectations for Birch's scientific abilities, advised him to travel to Italy to study "the hidden and hitherto unused manuscripts of the New Testament." Prime Minister Ove Høegh-Guldberg successfully helped Birch in acquiring the funds for this venture, and in 1781 Birch left Göttingen, through Switzerland and southern France to Italy. The journey went through Turin, Genoa, and Livorno to Rome and from there on to Naples. In Rome he found an invaluable aid in Monsignor Stefano Borgia, secretary of the Sacra Congregatio de Propaganda Fide, who supposedly gave him "considerable evidence to show his friendship." Before he left Rome, Birch was introduced to Pope Pius VI. His way home went through Florence, Bologna, Parma, Venice, Vienna, Prague, Dresden, and Leipzig to Göttingen, and from there to Copenhagen. Everywhere he went, his time was spent collecting books, collating old manuscripts of the New Testament and the apocryphal gospels, and busying himself with the study of these.

In the years 1781–1783 he travelled throughout Italy and Germany for the purpose of examining manuscripts. In the Vatican Library he examined 40, in the library of Barberini 10, in other Roman libraries 17, in Florence and other parts of Italy 38, and in Vienna 12 manuscripts.

== New edition of the New Testament ==
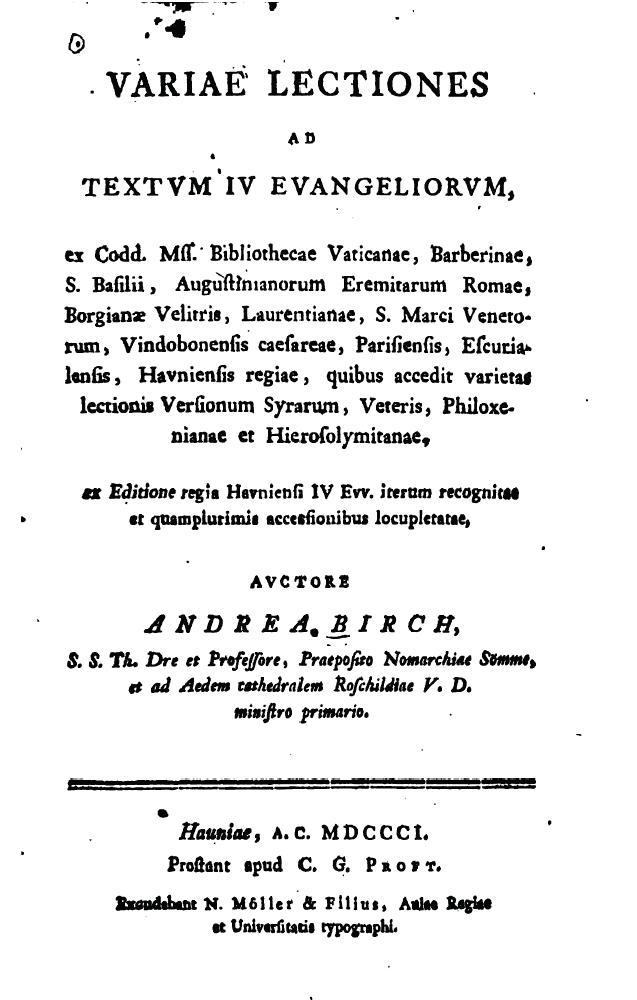
Variae Lectiones ad Textum IV Evangeliorum, Haunie 1801

After his return in 1783 the king commanded him to Guldberg's option to attend an edition of the New Testament basic text which was printed at royal expense, it was one of Goldberg's last acts as Prime Minister. This version would be a wonderful edition with a rich critical apparatus, which could show the learned world that Denmark would not be outdone when it was a study of the Christian holy book. The large Royal Library in Copenhagen owned the once considerable variation collections of the New Testament, not only due to general superintendent J. G. C. Adler, who had studied the Syrian Palestinian translation, and then professor in Copenhagen Daniel Gotthilf Moldenhawer who had examined the New Testament manuscripts in the Escorial palace and Professor at Kiel C. G. Hensler, who had compared the Copenhagen manuscripts with the usual text. Based on these processors and its own collections completed Birch preparation of the four gospels, which appeared in 1788 as the first part of the planned magnificent edition, in both folio and quarto. As a kind of introduction to this work he had already three years past where a "critical description of Greek Manuscripts of the New Testament."

Birch's large version of the four Gospels, for which he used John Mill's edition of the New Testament as basis, caused no little stir in the scholarly world, and many thought that the young scholars may be obvious to a university position in his homeland. That same year, as Birch issued the first volume of his magnificent edition, an extraordinary professorship in theology was created, Birch decided to apply but the position eventually went to Friedrich Christian Carl Hinrich Münter instead. Since both competitors' sample lectures were printed, the critical author Niels Ditlev Riegels, as usual, was discontented with the choice, and in one of his writings ("Tanker ved Gjennemlæsningen af Prøveforelæsningerne for det overordentlige theologiske Professorat", "Thoughts inspired by the reading of the test lectures for the extraordinary professorship at the Theological Faculty", 1789) he made the insinuation that Münter was appointed to the position beforehand and that the whole competition was just staged to defend that "the University was again being enriched with a German". An unbiased comparison of the two competitors' lectures shows that the lecture of Münter really was not up to his usual standard, but his later authorship soon proved him to be the right choice for the position.

In 1798 Birch published a collection of various readings to the Acts and Epistles (among them from the Codex Vaticanus). Subsequently, in 1800 he published a collection of various readings to the Apocalypse, and in 1801 a collection of various readings to the four Gospels.

== Works ==
- Birch, Andreas (1785). Kritisk Beskrivelse over groeske Haandskrifter af det Nye Testamente, Copenhagen. Schultz. OCLC 311270400.
- ——— (1788). Quatuor Evangelia graece, cum variantibus a textu lectionibus codd. MSS. bibliothecae Vaticanae, Barberinae, Laurentianae, Vindobonensis, Escurialensis, Havniensis Regia, quibus accedunt, lectiones versionum syrarum, veteris, Philoxenianae, et Hierosolymitanae. Havniae: Excudebat J.F. Schultz. OCLC 38021560.
- ——— (1798). Variae Lectiones ad Textum Actorum Apostolorum, Epistolarum Catholicarum et Pauli. Hauniae: apud Proft & Storch. OCLC 1040245592.
- ——— (1800). Variae lectiones ad Apocalypsin. Hauniae: apud Proft & Storch. OCLC 31247859.
- ——— (1801). Variae Lectiones ad Textum IV Evangeliorum. Hauniae: apud Proft & Storch. OCLC 31246898.

== See also ==
- Daniel Gotthilf Moldenhawer
