= Western text-type =

New Testament text type

In textual criticism of the New Testament, the Western text-type is one of the main text types. It is the predominant form of the New Testament text witnessed in the Old Latin and Syriac translations from the Greek, and also in quotations from certain 2nd and 3rd-century Christian writers, including Cyprian, Tertullian and Irenaeus. The Western text had many characteristic features, which appeared in text of the Gospels, Book of Acts, and in Pauline epistles. The Catholic epistles and the Book of Revelation probably did not have a Western form of text. It was named "Western" by Semmler (1725–1791), having originated in early centers of Christianity in the Western Roman Empire.

However, the existence of a singular Western text-type has been criticized by some recent textual critics such as J. Read-Heimerdinger, instead preferring to call the Western text a group of text-types and not as a singular text-type.

== Description ==
The main characteristic of the Western text is a heavy use of paraphrase: "Words and even clauses are changed, omitted, and inserted with surprising freedom, wherever it seemed that the meaning could be brought out with greater force and definiteness." One possible source of glossing is the desire to harmonise and to complete: "More peculiar to the Western text is the readiness to adopt alterations or additions from sources extraneous to the books which ultimately became canonical." This text type often presents longer variants of text, but in a few places, including the end of the Gospel of Luke, it has shorter variants, with omissions known as the Western non-interpolations.

Only one Greek uncial manuscript is considered to transmit a Western text for the four Gospels and the Book of Acts, the fifth century Codex Bezae; the sixth century Codex Claromontanus is considered to transmit a Western text for the letters of Saint Paul and is followed by two ninth century uncials: F and G. Many "Western" readings are also found in the Old Syriac translations of the Gospels, the Sinaitic and the Curetonian, though opinions vary as to whether these versions can be considered witnesses to the Western text-type. A number of fragmentary early papyri from Egypt also have Western readings, 𝔓^{29}, 𝔓^{38}, 𝔓^{48}; and in addition, Codex Sinaiticus is considered to be Western in the first eight chapters of John. The term "Western" is a bit of a misnomer because members of the Western text-type have been found in the Christian East, including Syria.

Manuscripts classified as "Western" generally have longer readings when compared to other text-types.

== Witnesses ==
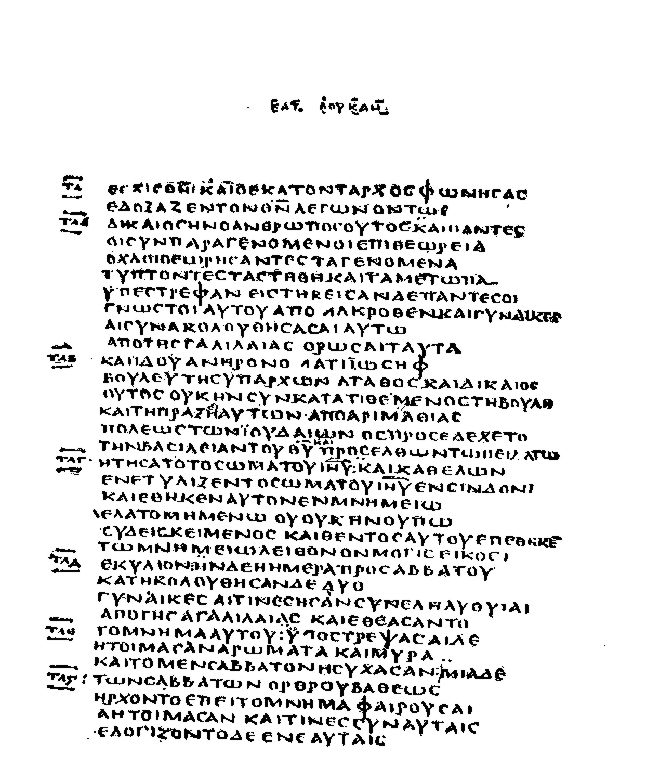
Codex Bezae

Sign	Name	Date	Content
𝔓^{37}	Papyrus 37	ca. 250	fragment of Matt 26
𝔓^{38}	Papyrus Michigan	c. 300	fragment of Acts
𝔓^{48}	Papyrus 48	3rd	fragment of Acts 23
𝔓^{69}	Oxyrhynchus XXIV	3rd	fragment of Luke 22
0171	Uncial 0171, ε 07	4th	fragments Matt and Luke
(01) ﬡ	{Codex Sinaiticus}	4th	John 1:1–8:38
D^{ea} (05)	Codex Bezae	c. 400	Gospels and Acts
W (032)	Codex Washingtonianus	5th	Mark 1:1–5:30
D^{p} (06)	Codex Claromontanus	6th	Pauline Epistles
F^{p} (010)	Codex Augiensis	9th	Pauline Epistles
G^{p} (012)	Codex Boernerianus	9th	Pauline Epistles

Other manuscripts: 𝔓^{25}, 𝔓^{29} (?), 𝔓^{41}, 066, 0177, 36, 88, 181 (Pauline epistles), 255, 257, 338, 383 (Acts), 440 (Acts), 614 (Acts), 913, 915, 917, 1108, 1245, 1518, 1611, 1836, 1874, 1898, 1912, 2138, 2298, 2412 (Acts).

Compared to the Byzantine text-type distinctive Western readings in the Gospels are more likely to be abrupt in their Greek expression. Compared to the Alexandrian text-type distinctive Western readings in the Gospels are more likely to display glosses, additional details, and instances where the original passages appear to be replaced with longer paraphrases. In distinction from both Alexandrian and Byzantine texts, the Western text-type consistently omits a series of eight short phrases from verses in the Gospel of Luke; the so-called Western non-interpolations. In at least two Western texts, the Gospels appear in a variant order: Matthew, John, Luke, Mark. The Western text of the Epistles of Paul - as witnessed in the Codex Claromontanus and uncials F and G - does not share the periphrastic tendencies of the Western text in the Gospels and Acts, and it is not clear whether they should be considered to share a single text-type.

Although the Western text-type survives in relatively few witnesses, some of these are as early as the earliest witnesses to the Alexandrian text type. Nevertheless, the majority of text critics consider the Western text in the Gospels to be characterised by periphrasis and expansion; and accordingly tend to prefer the Alexandrian readings. In the letters of St Paul, the counterpart Western text is more restrained, and some text critics regard it as the most reliable witness to the original. Nonetheless, the 'Western' Pauline materials do exhibit distinctive redactional biases, with a number of distinctive variants which collectively tend to diminish the status of the women in the congregations addressed by Paul.

== Textual variants ==
Mark 13:2

- και μετα τριων ημερων αλλος αναστησεται ανευ χειρων — D W it

Mark 13:33

- omitted phrase και προσευχεσθε ('and pray') by codices B, D, a, c, k

Mark 15:34 (see Ps 22:2)

- ὠνείδισάς με ('insult me') — D, it^{c, (i), k}, syr^{h}
- ἐγκατέλιπές με ('forsaken me') — Alexandrian mss
- με ἐγκατέλιπες (see Mt 27:46) — Byzantine mss

John 1:4

- ἐν αὐτῷ ζωὴ ἐστίν ('in him is life') — Codex Sinaiticus, Codex Bezae and majority of Vetus Latina manuscripts and Sahidic manuscripts.
- ἐν αὐτῷ ζωὴ ᾓν ('in him was life') — this variant is supported by mss of the Alexandrian, Byzantine and Caesarean texts

John 1:30:

- ὑπὲρ — p^{5}, p^{66}, p^{75}, Sinaiticus*, Codex Vaticanus Graecus 1209, C*, W^{S}
- περι — Sinaiticus^{2}, A, C^{3}, L, Θ, Ψ, 063, 0101, f^{1}, f^{13}, Byz

John 1:34

- ὁ ἐκλεκτός — p^{5}, Sinaiticus, i^{tb,e,ff^{2}}, syr^{c,s}
- ὁ ἐκλεκτός ὑιος — it^{a, ff^{2c}}, syr^{pal^{mss}}, cop^{sa}
- ὁ ὑιος — mss of the Alexandrian, Byzantine and Caesarean texts

John 3:15

- ἐν αὐτῷ — p^{75}, B, W^{S}, 083, 0113
- ἐπ' αὐτῷ — p^{63}, A
- εἰς αὐτον — p^{63}, Sinaiticus, A, Koridethi, Athous Lavrensis, 063, 086, f^{1}, f^{13}, Byz

John 7:8

- εγω ουκ αναβαινω εις την εορτην ταυτην — Sinaiticus, Bezae, Cyprius, Petropolitanus, 1071, 1079, 1241, 1242, 1546
- εγω ουπω αναβαινω εις την εορτην ταυτην — Papyrus 66, Papyrus 75, Vaticanus, Regius, Borgianus, Washingtonianus, Monacensis, Sangallensis, Koridethi, Athous Lavrensis, Uncial 0105, 0180, 0250, f^{1}, f^{13}, 28, 700, 892, 1010, 1195, 1216, 1230, 1253, 1344, 1365, 1646, 2148, mss of Byz.

Romans 12:11

- it reads καιρω for κυριω, – Codex Claromontanus, Codex Augiensis, Codex Boernerianus 5 it ^{d,g}, Origen^{lat}.

1 Corinthians 7:5

- τη προσευχη ('prayer') – 𝔓^{11}, 𝔓^{46}, א*, A, B, C, D, F, G, P, Ψ, 6, 33, 81, 104, 181, 629, 630, 1739, 1877, 1881, 1962, it vg, cop, arm, eth
- τη νηστεια και τη προσευχη ('fasting and prayer') – א^{c}, K, L, 88, 326, 436, 614, 1241, 1984, 1985, 2127, 2492, 2495, Byz, Lect, syr^{p,h}, goth
- τη προσευχη και νηστεια ('prayer and fasting') – 330, 451, John of Damascus

1 Corinthians 14:34-35

- both verses are displaced to the conclusion of Chapter 14, following verse 40 – Codex Claromontanus, Codex Augiensis, Codex Boernerianus.

== See also ==
- Acts of the Apostles#Manuscripts
- Caesarean text-type
- Categories of New Testament manuscripts
- Western non-interpolations

== Bibliography ==
- J. Rendel Harris, Four lectures on the western text of the New Testament (London 1894)
- A. F. J. Klijn, A Survey of the Researches Into the Western Text of the Gospels and Acts (1949-1959), Novum Testamentum, Volume 3, Numbers 1–2, 1959, pp. 1–53.
- Bruce M. Metzger, Bart D. Ehrman, The Text of the New Testament: Its Transmission, Corruption, and Restoration, Oxford University Press, New York, Oxford 2005, pp. 276–277.
- Bruce M. Metzger, A Textual Commentary On The Greek New Testament: A Companion Volume To The United Bible Societies' Greek New Testament, 1994, United Bible Societies, London & New York, pp. 5*-6*.
- Delobel J., Focus on the ‘Western’ Text in Recent Studies, Ephemerides Theologicae Lovanienses, 1997, vol.73, pp. 401–410.
