= P41 =

P41 or P-41 may refer to:

== Vessels ==
- ARA Espora (P-41), a corvette of the Argentine Navy
- HNoMS Uredd (P41), a submarine transferred from the Royal Navy to the Royal Norwegian Navy
- LÉ Orla (P41), a patrol vessel of the Irish Naval Service
- Spanish patrol vessel Meteoro (P-41)
- P-41 Cormorán, a retired patrol boat of the Spanish Navy

== Other uses ==
- Papyrus 41, a biblical manuscript
- Phosphorus-41, an isotope of phosphorus
- Seversky XP-41, an American prototype fighter aircraft
- P41, a Latvian state regional road
- P41, a Mazda auto racing engine developed by Advanced Engine Research
- P4_{1}, three-dimensional space group number 76
