= Minuscule 383 =

- New Testament manuscript
- Text: Acts, Catholic epistles, Paul
- Date: 13th century
- Script: Greek
- Now at: Bodleian Library
- Size: 18 cm by 13 cm
- Type: Western, Alexandrian
- Category: none

Minuscule 383 (in the Gregory-Aland numbering), α 353 (Soden), is a Greek minuscule manuscript of the New Testament, on parchment. Paleographically it has been assigned to the 13th century. Formerly it was labelled by 58^{a} and 224^{p}.

== Description ==
The codex contains the text of the Acts, Catholic epistles, and Pauline epistles on 181 parchment leaves (18 cm by 13 cm) with lacunae (Hebrews 13:7-25). The text is written in one column per page, in 24-28 lines per page.

Folio 182, bound with the codex, contains the text of lectionary 922.

== Text ==
The Greek text of the codex is a representative of the Western text-type in Acts of the Apostles. In rest of books it represents the Alexandrian text-type.

Kurt Aland did not place it in any Category.

== History ==
The manuscript was examined by Wettstein, Gaisford, Scholz, and Pott. Codex 58^{a} of Wettstein is the same as 22^{a}. C. R. Gregory saw it in 1883.

The manuscript was added to the list of the New Testament manuscripts by Scholz (1794–1852).

Formerly it was labelled by 58^{a} and 224^{p}. In 1908 Gregory gave the number 383 to it.

The manuscript is currently housed at the Bodleian Library in Oxford (MS. E. D. Clarke 9, fols. 1–181).

== See also ==
- List of New Testament minuscules
- Biblical manuscript
- Textual criticism
