= Minuscule 257 =

- New Testament manuscript
- Text: Acts, Paul
- Date: 14th century
- Script: Greek
- Now at: Biblioteka Jagiellońska
- Size: 24.3 cm by 17.5 cm
- Type: Western text-type
- Category: none
- Note: marginalia

Minuscule 257 (in the Gregory-Aland numbering), α 466 (Soden), is a Greek minuscule manuscript of the New Testament, on parchment. Palaeographically it has been assigned to the 14th century. Formerly it was labelled by 302^{a} and 260^{p}. Scrivener by 250^{a} and 300^{p}. It has marginalia.

== Description ==
The codex contains the text of the Acts of the Apostles, Catholic epistles, and Pauline epistles on 116 parchment leaves (24.3 cm by 17.5 cm). The text is written in one column per page, 39 lines per page.

The text is divided according to the κεφαλαια (chapters), whose numbers are given at the margin, and the τιτλοι (titles of chapters) at the top of the pages.

It contains prolegomena, lectionary markings at the margin, Synaxarion, Menologion, subscriptions at the end of each book, with numbers of στιχοι. It has also some Psalms.

The Greek text of the codex is a representative of the Western text-type. Aland did not place it in any Category.

== History ==
The manuscript was written by Joseph, a scribe. Heinrich Brugsch brought it from Cairo to Berlin. It was held in Königliche Bibliothek Gr. Quarto 43. Gregory saw it in 1887. Formerly it was labelled by 302^{a} and 260^{p}. In 1908 C. R. Gregory gave the number 257 to it.

At the end of 1943 year has increased the frequency of the bombing of Berlin. The Prussian State Library sent many collections out of Berlin to be sheltered in Silesia for safekeeping. As the result of postwar border changes some of these collections were found in Poland (among them minuscule 257). They were moved to the Jagiellonian University Library.

It was cited only once in the Novum Testamentum Graece (Nestle-Aland 27 ed.) – in 1 Cor 11:23.

The manuscript is currently housed at the Biblioteka Jagiellońska (Fonds der Berliner Hss, Graec. qu. 43) at Kraków.

== See also ==
- List of New Testament minuscules
- Biblical manuscript
- Textual criticism
- Minuscule 255
