= Papyrus 41 =

Papyrus 𝔓^{41}
- New Testament manuscript
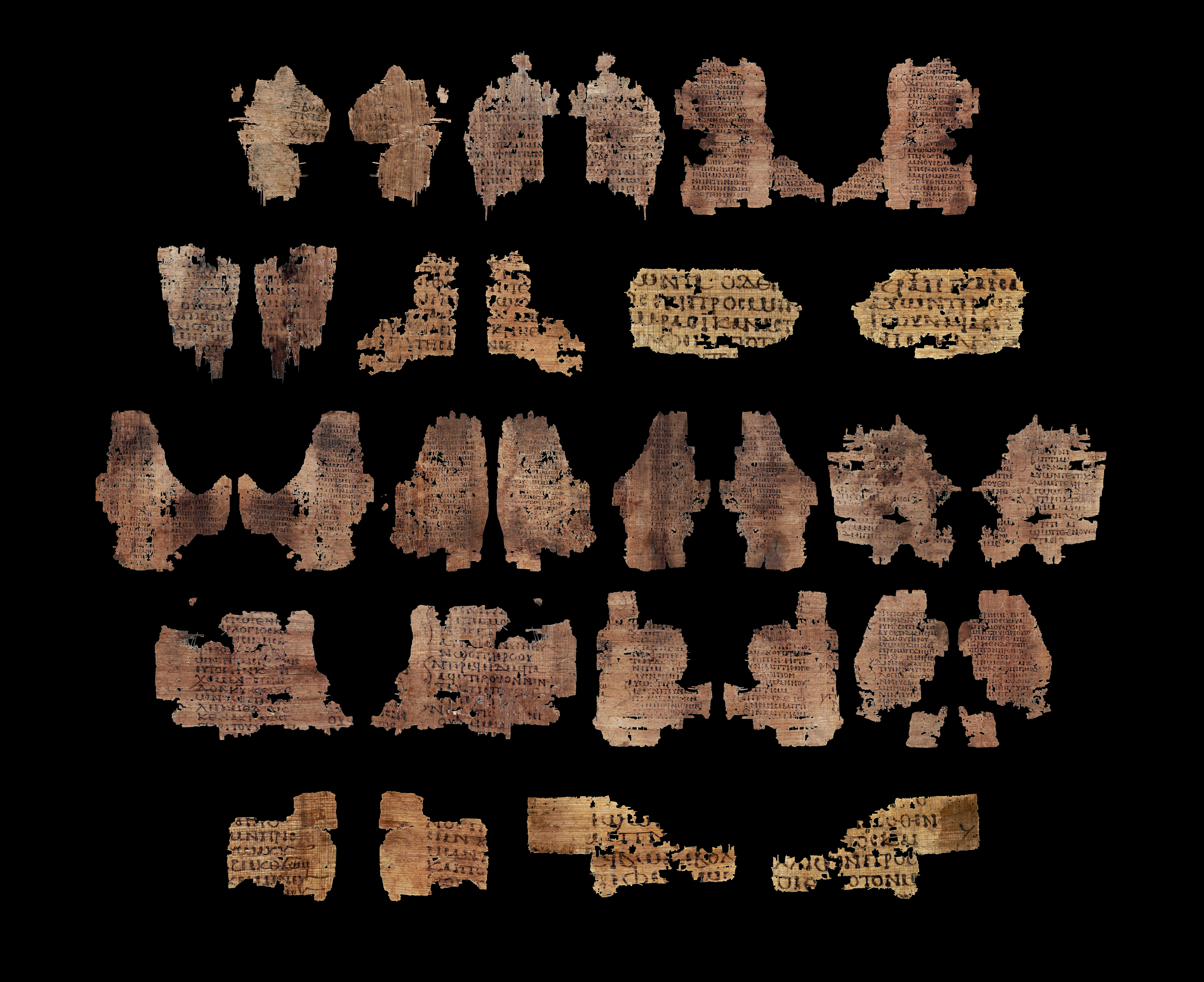
- Recto and verso of all fragments composing Ms Papyrus 41
- Text: Acts 17-22 †
- Date: 8th century
- Script: Greek-Coptic diglot
- Found: Egypt
- Now at: Österreichische Nationalbibliothek
- Cite: C. Wessely, Stud zur Pal und Pap XV, (Leipzig 1914), pp. 107-118.
- Type: Western text-type
- Category: III

Papyrus 41 (in the Gregory-Aland numbering), designated by 𝔓^{41}, is an early copy of the New Testament in Greek and Coptic. It is a diglot, it is a papyrus manuscript of the Acts of the Apostles. The manuscript paleographically has been assigned to the 8th century.

== Description ==
Contents

The Greek text of the papyrus contains: Acts 17:28-18:2.17-18.22-25.27; 19:1-4.6-8.13-16.18-19; 20:9-13.15-16.22-24.26-38; 21:3.4.26-27; 22:11-14.16-17.

The Coptic text of the papyrus contains: Acts 17:30-18:2.25.27-28; 19:2-8.15.17-19; 20:11-16.24-28; 20:36-21:3; 22:12-14.16-17.

Text-type

The Greek text of this codex is a representative of the Western text-type. Aland placed it in Category III.

Textual variants

In Acts 21:1 it reads Παταρα και Μυρα for Παταρα, the reading is supported by D^{gr} gig (it^{ph} Hyram) vg^{mss} cop^{sa};

Location

It is currently housed at the Österreichische Nationalbibliothek (Pap. G. 17973, 26133, 35831, 39783) in Vienna.

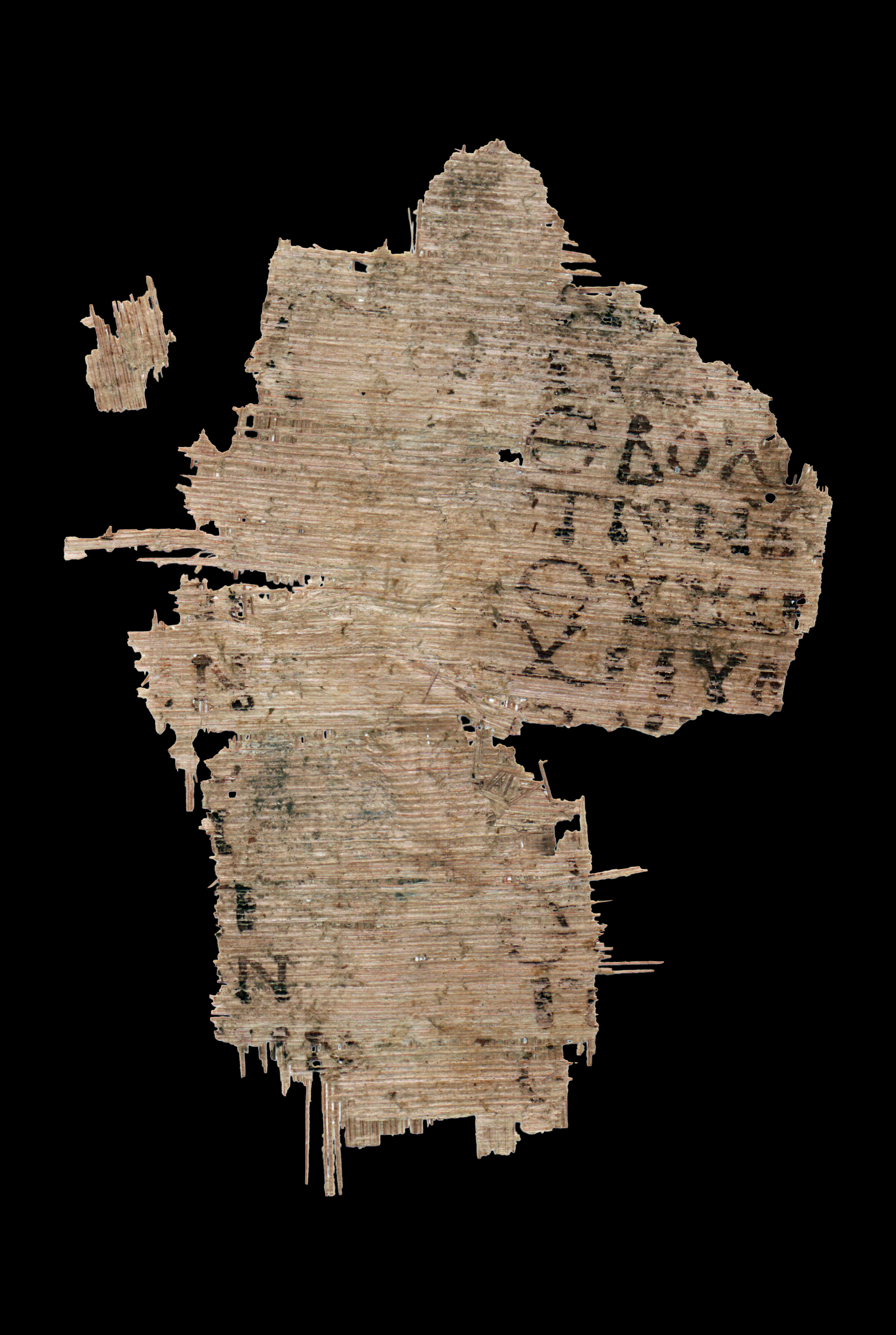
(K 7377) recto Acts 20, 28–31

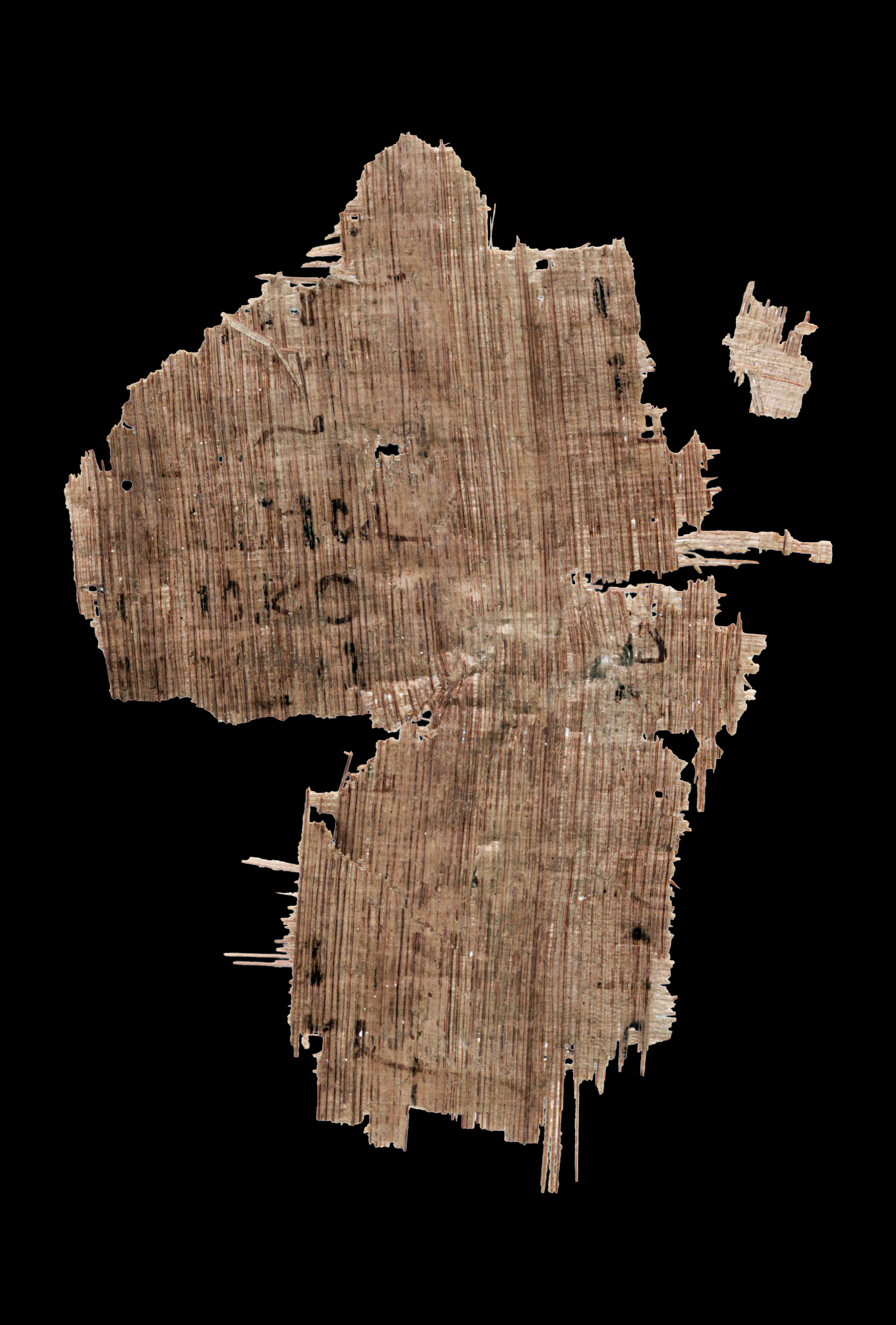
(K 7377) verso Acts 20, 32–35

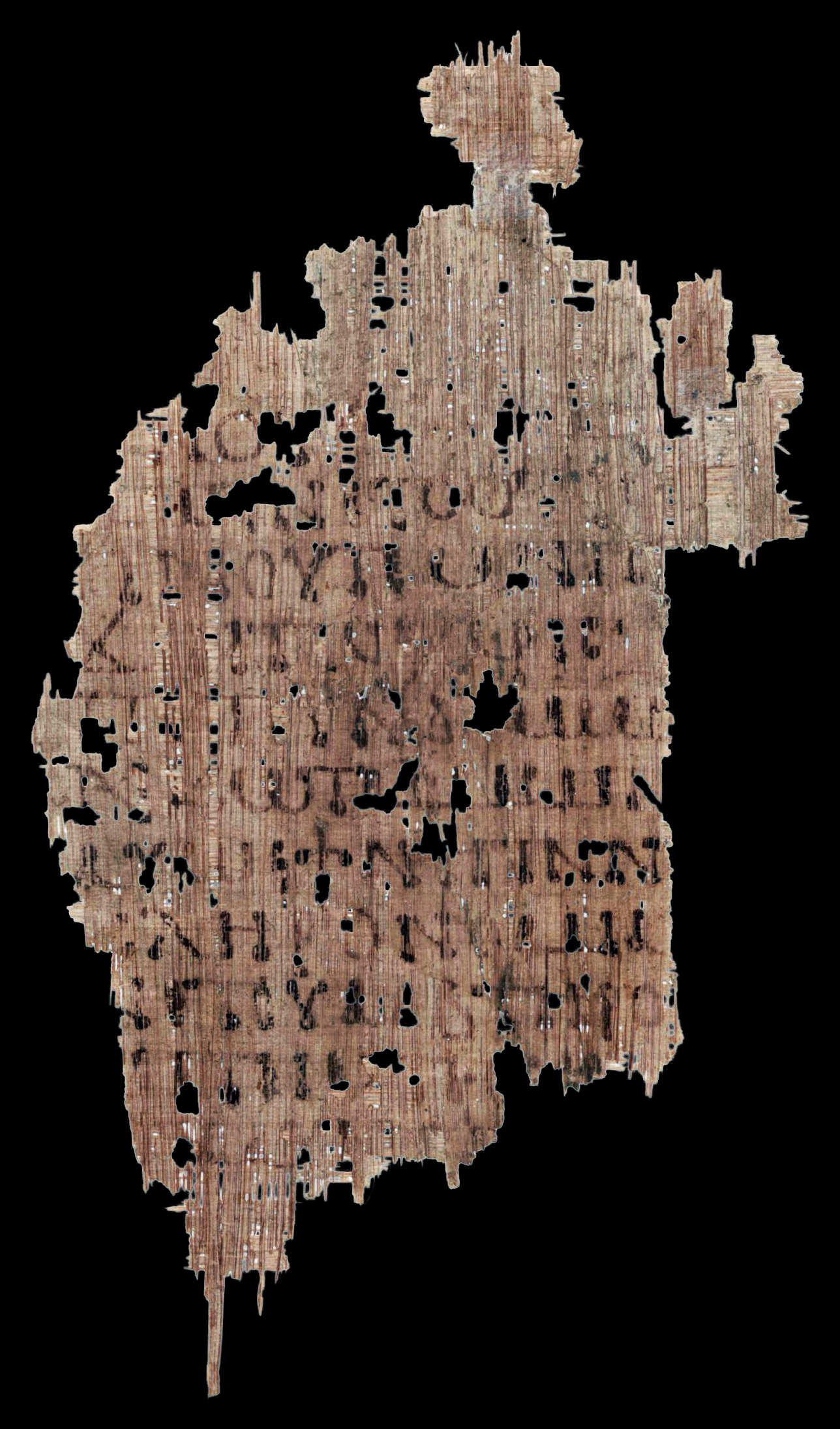
(K 7426) recto Acts 20, 28–31

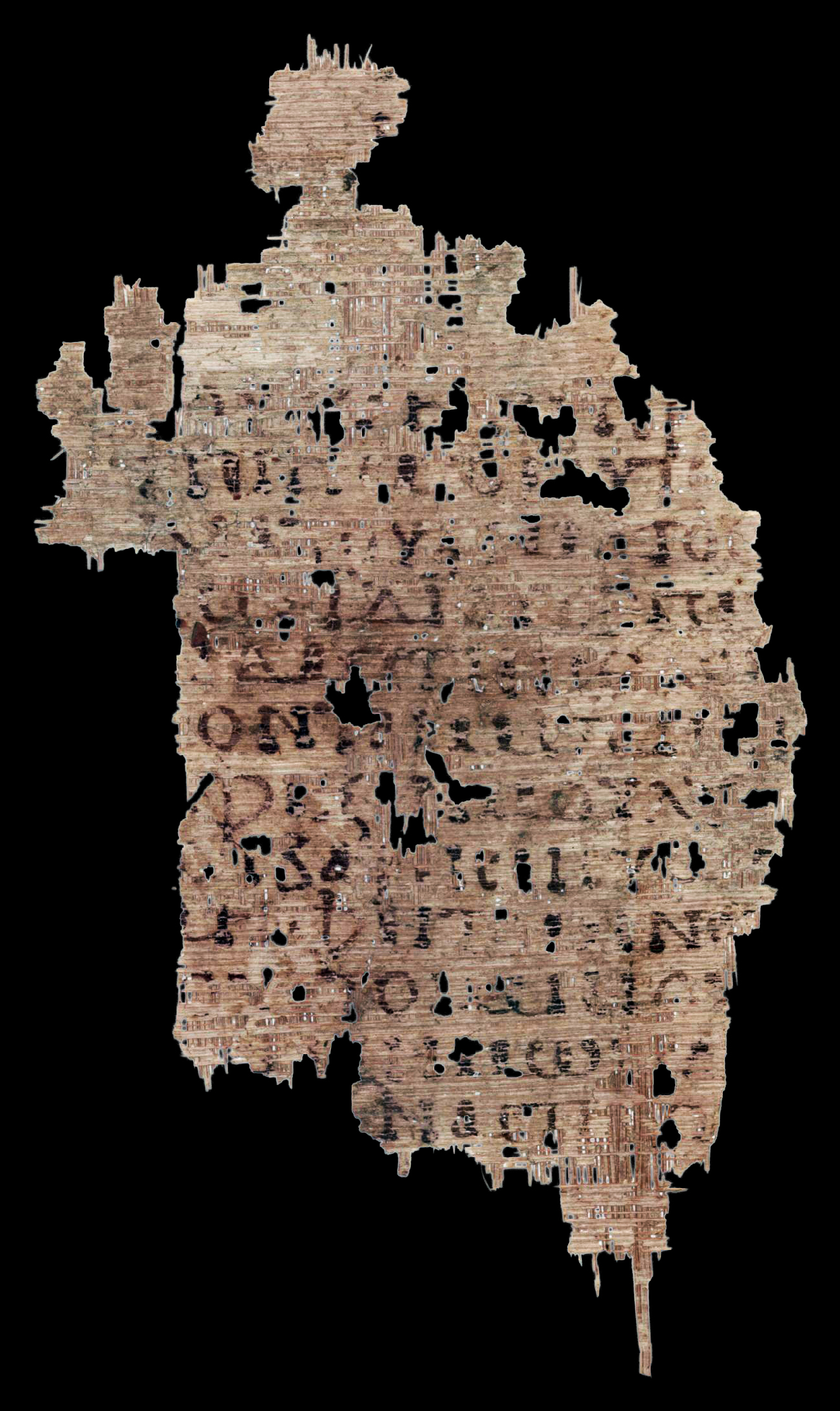
(K 7426) verso Acts 20, 32–35

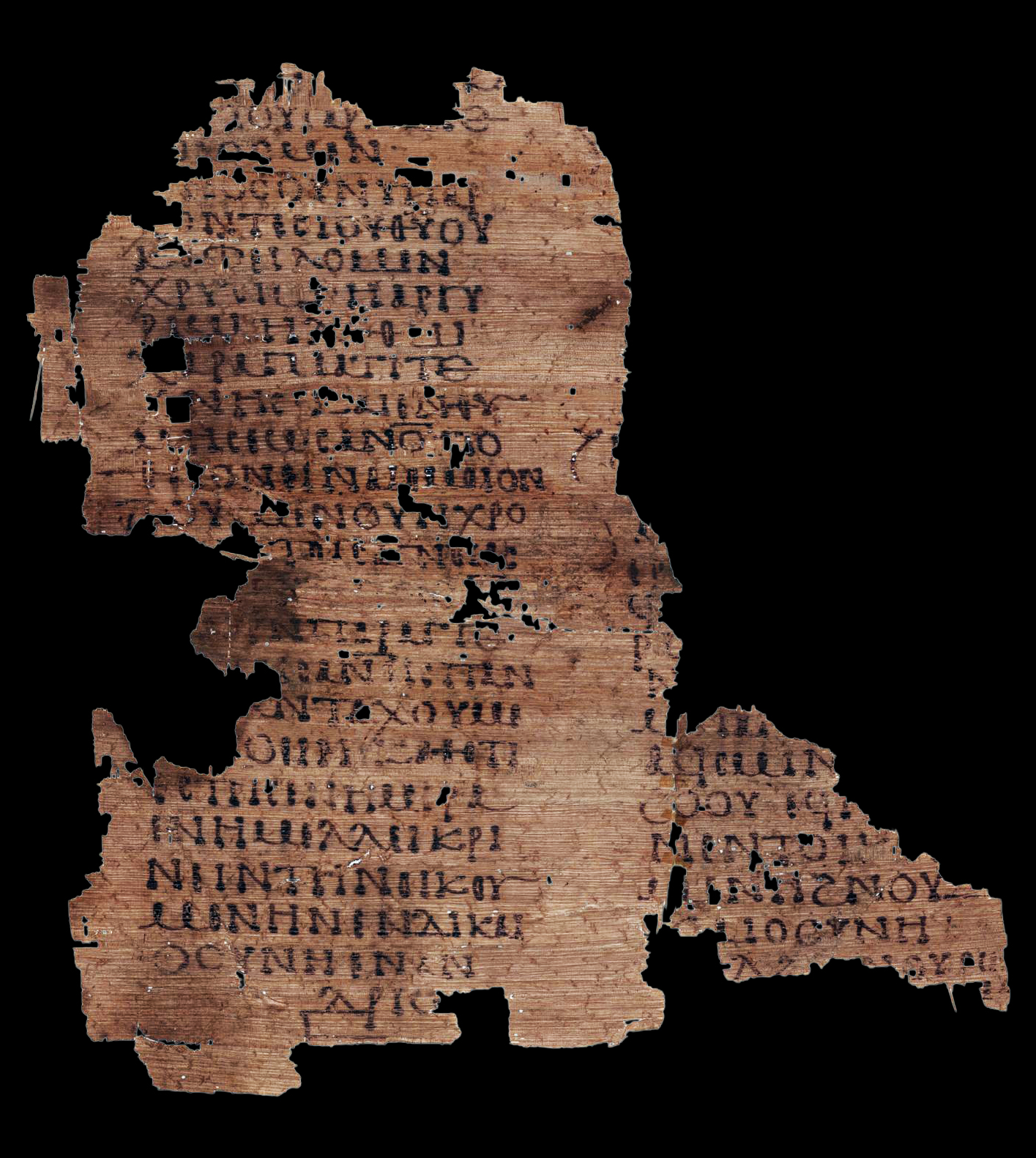
(K 7541) recto Acts 17, 28–31

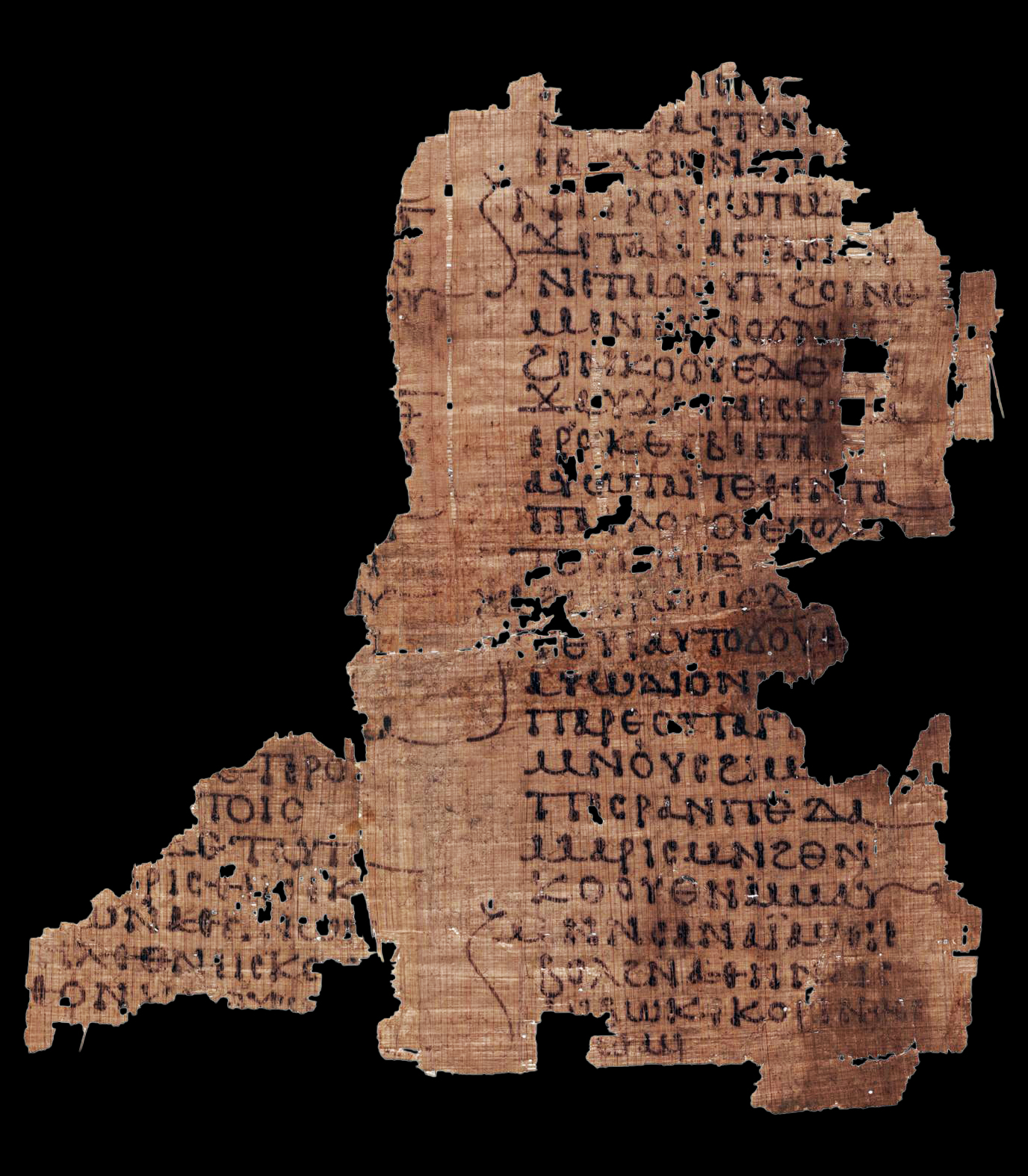
(K 7541) verso Acts 17, 34–18, 2

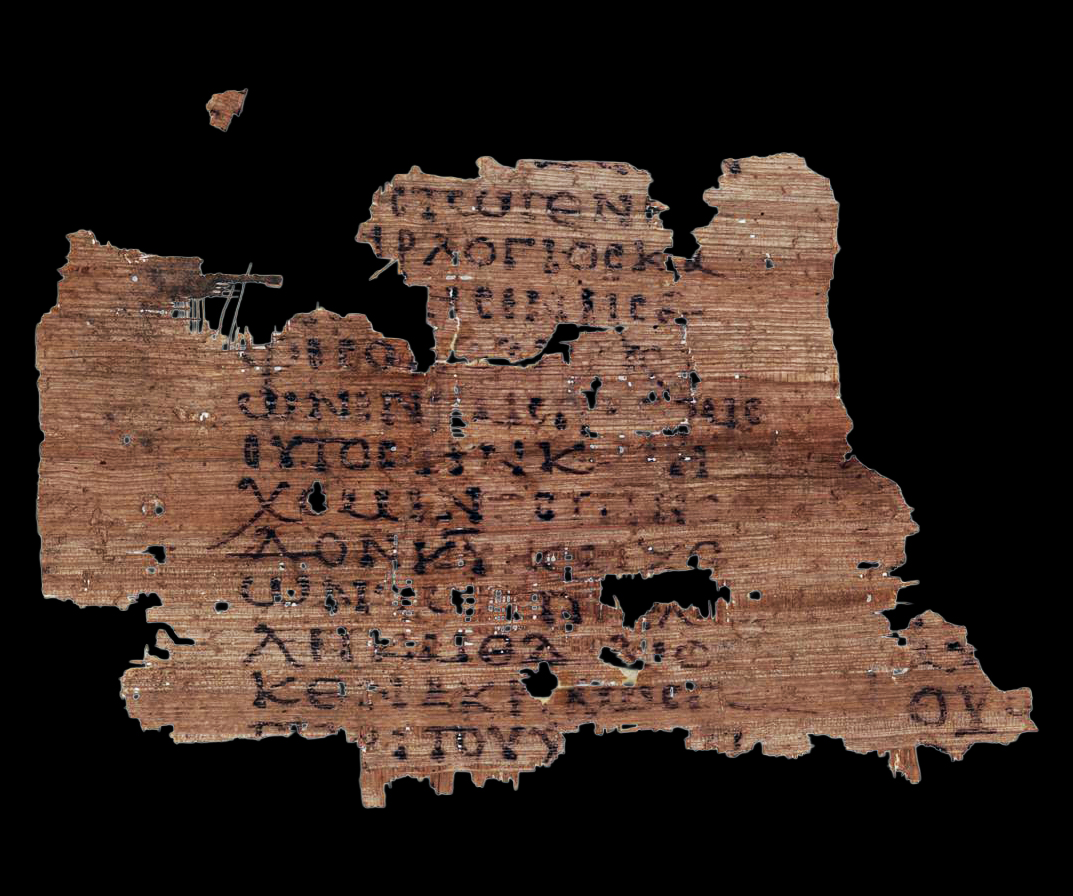
(K 7542) recto Acts 18, 24–25

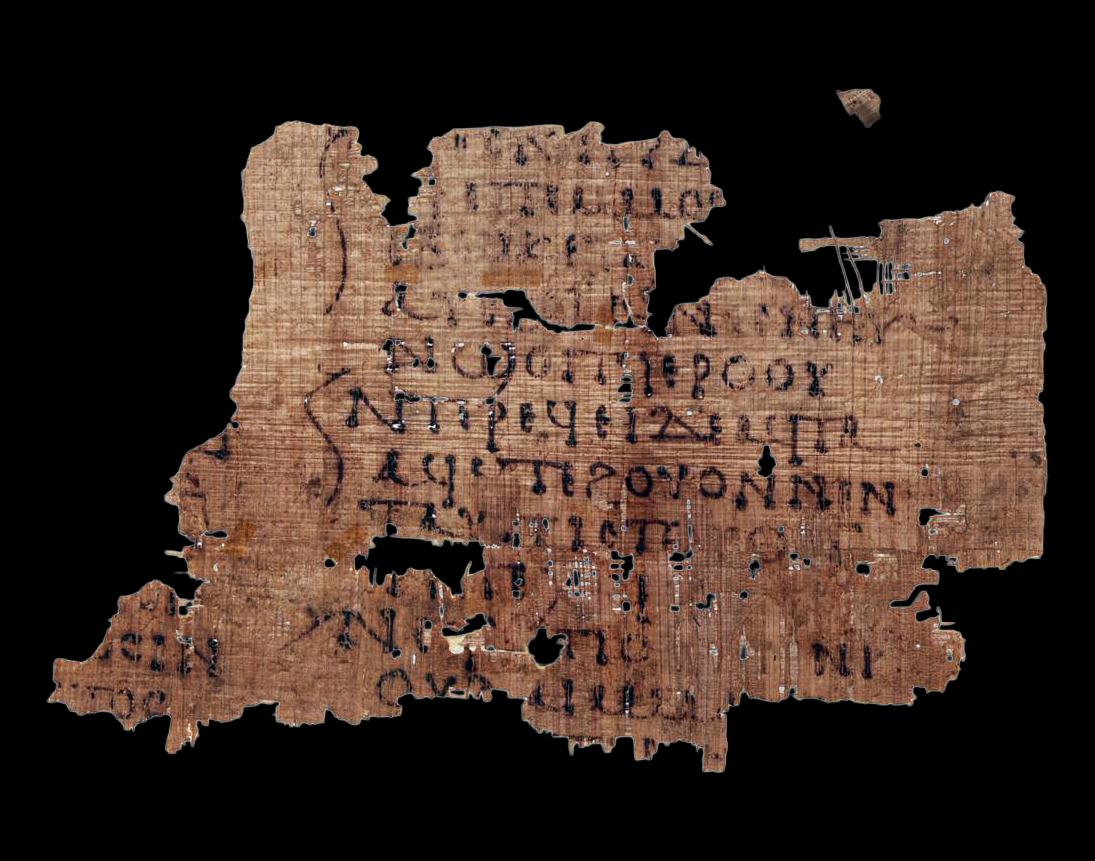
(K 7542) verso Acts 18, 27

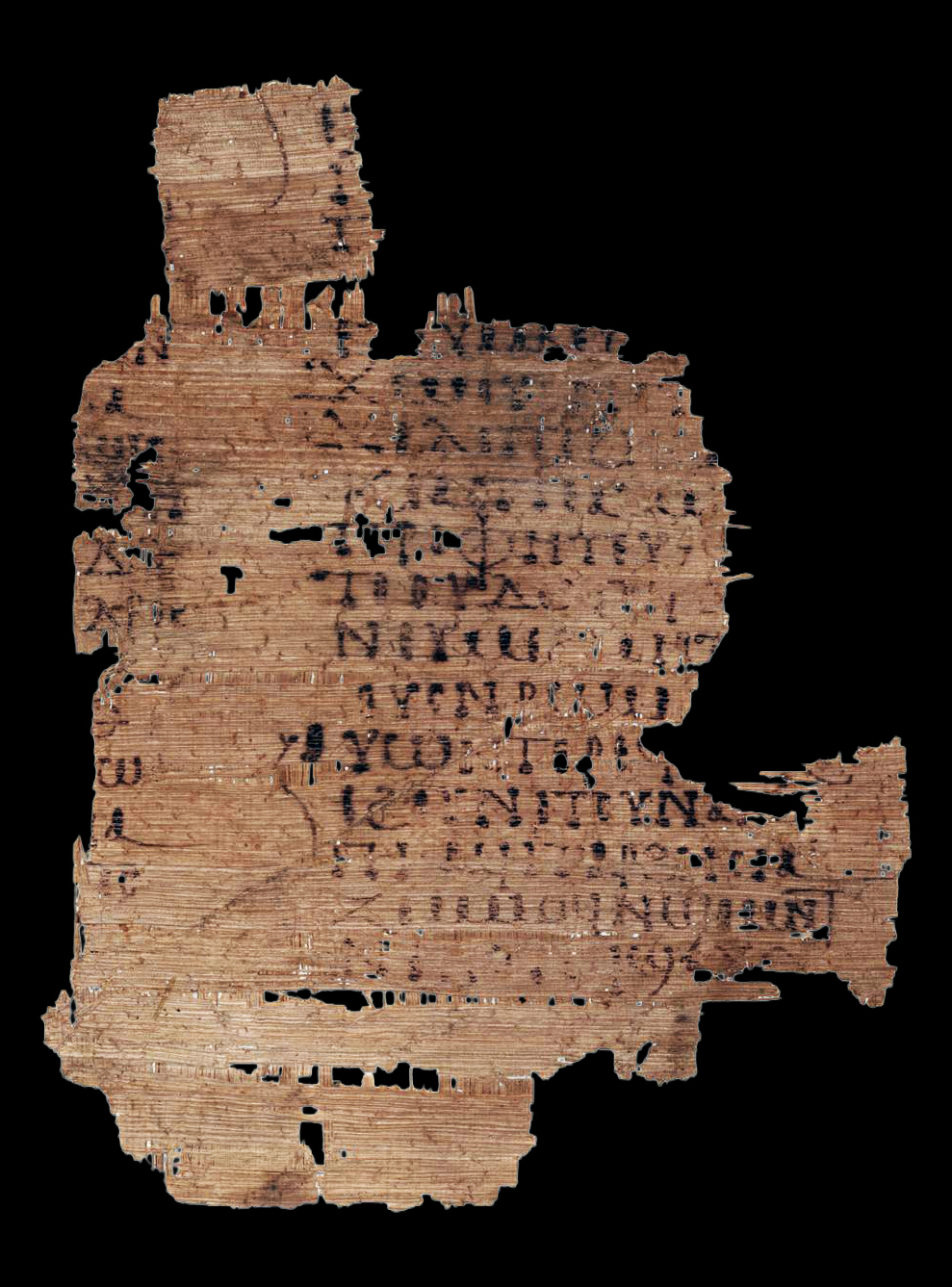
(K 7543) recto Acts 19, 1–4

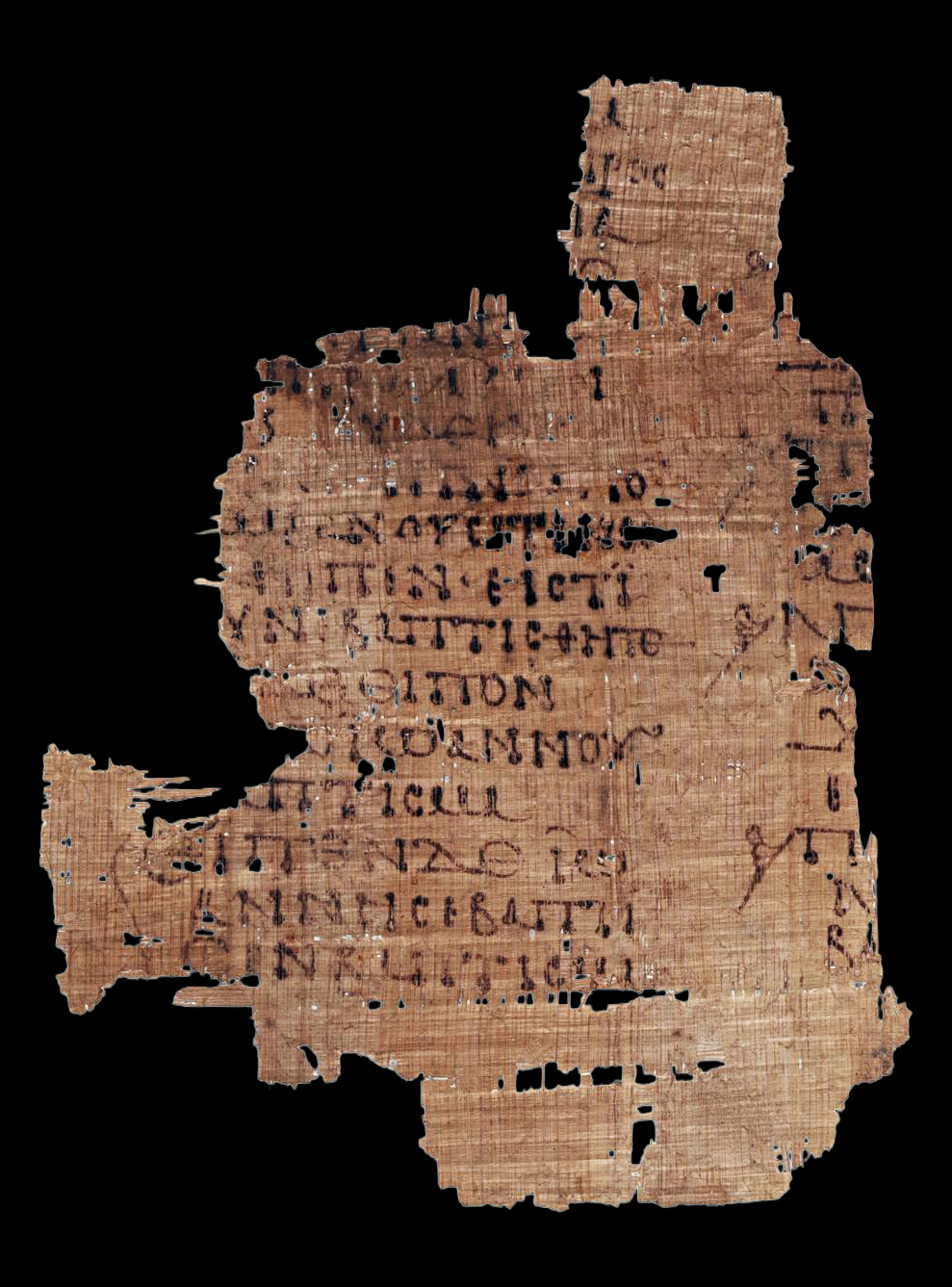
(K 7543) verso Acts 19, 6–8

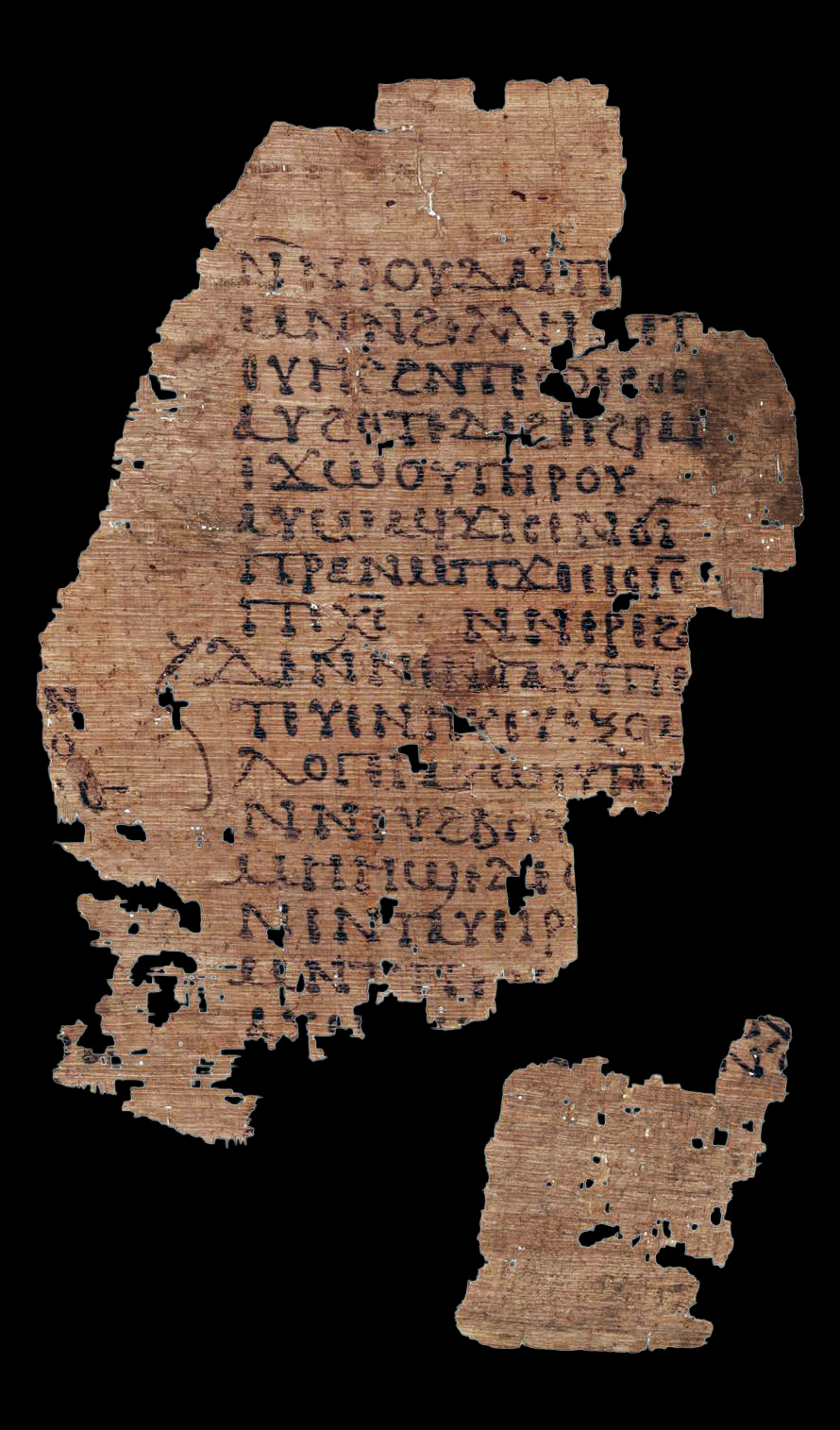
(K 7544) recto Acts 19, 13–16

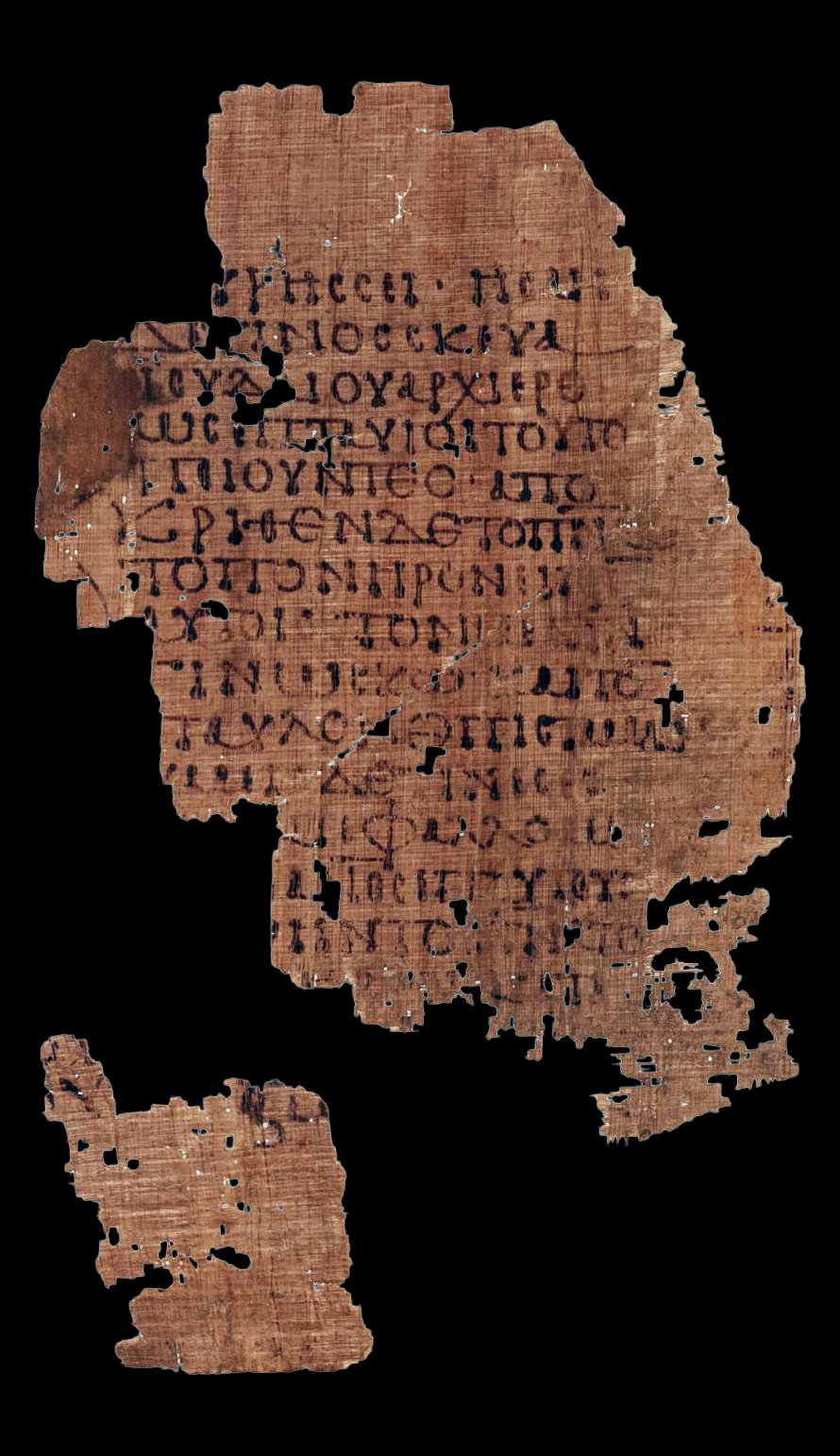
(K 7544) verso Acts 19, 18–19

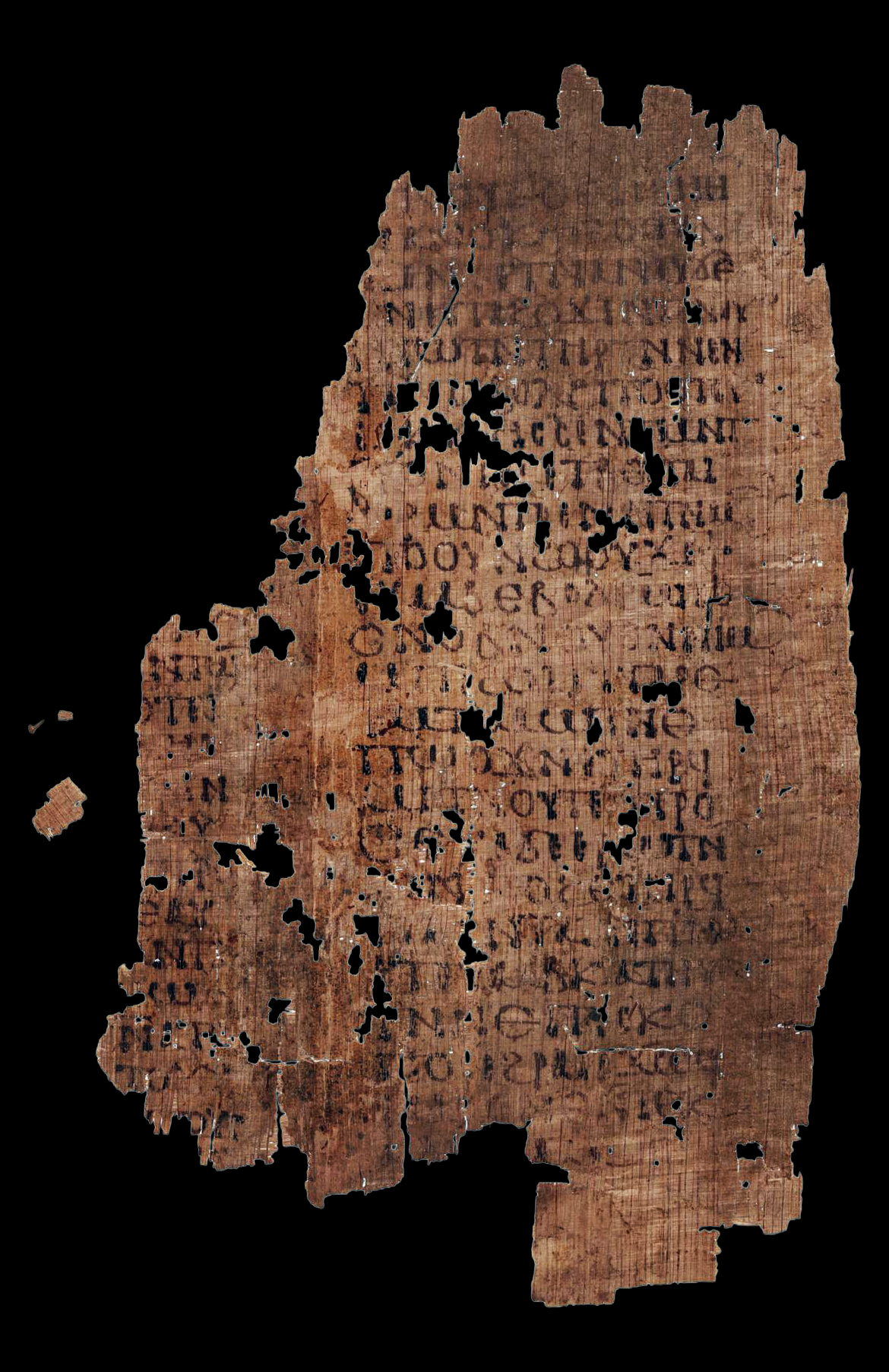
(K 7546) recto Acts 20, 22–24

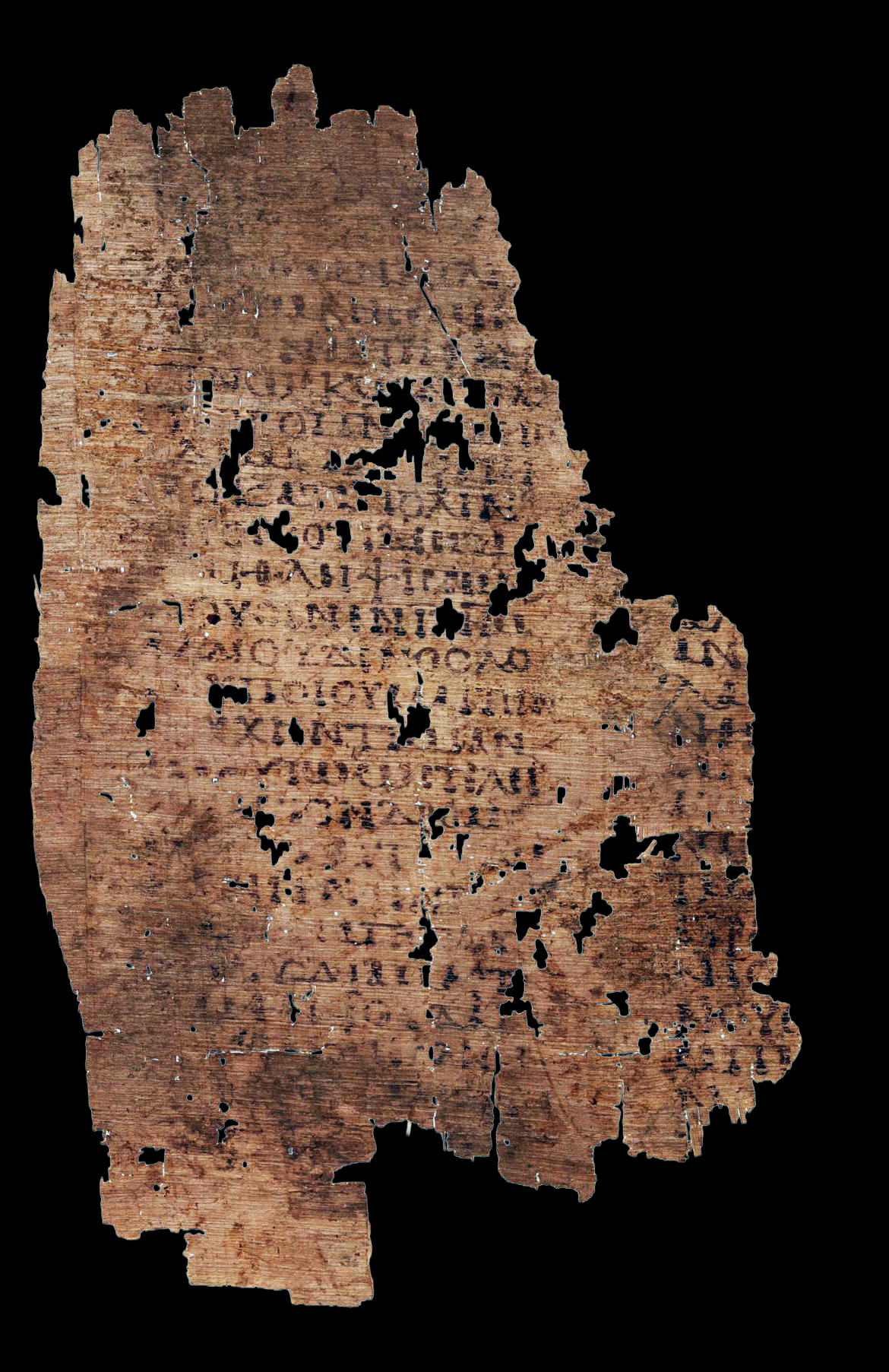
(K 7546) verso Acts 20, 26–28

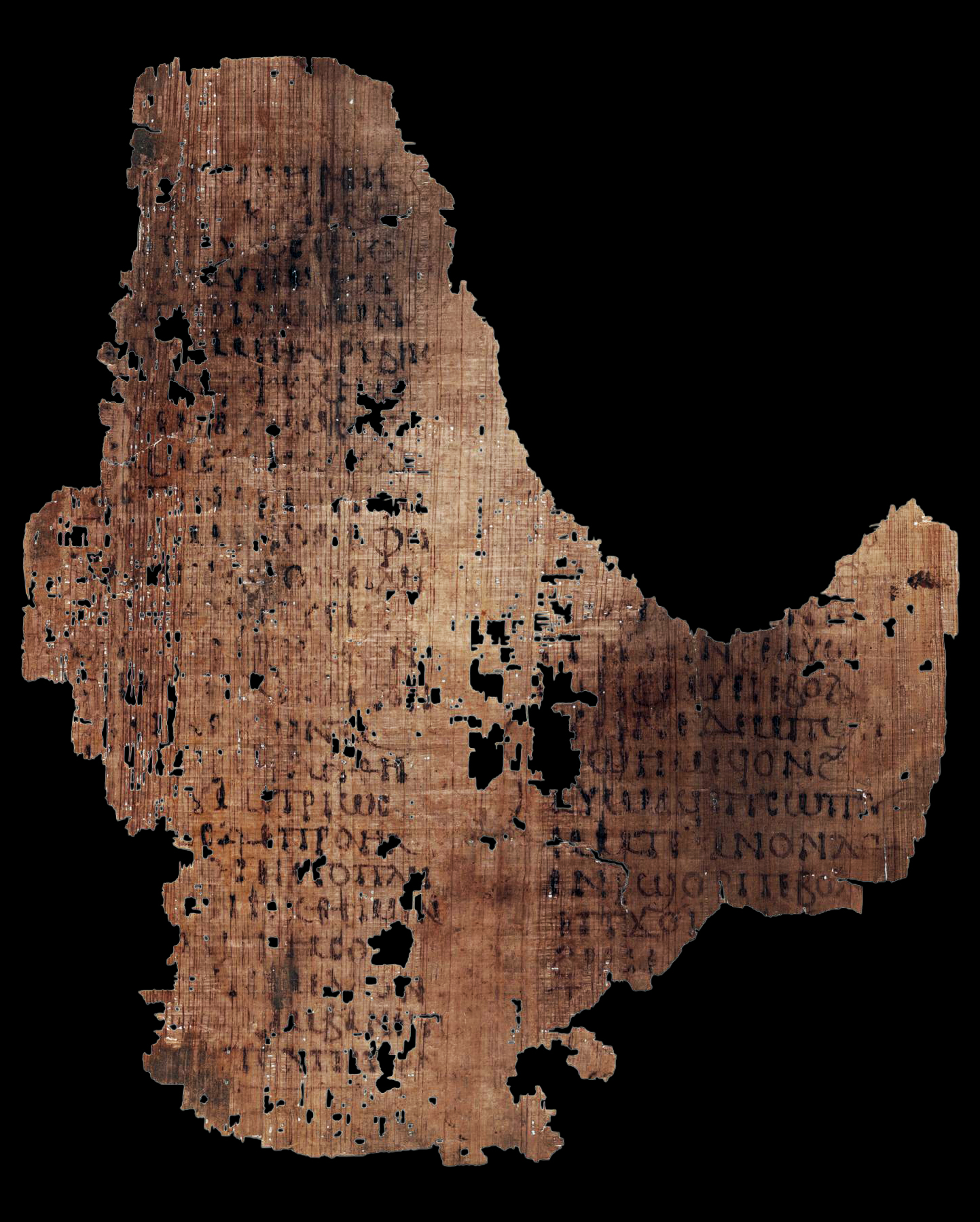
(K 7545) recto Acts 20, 9–13

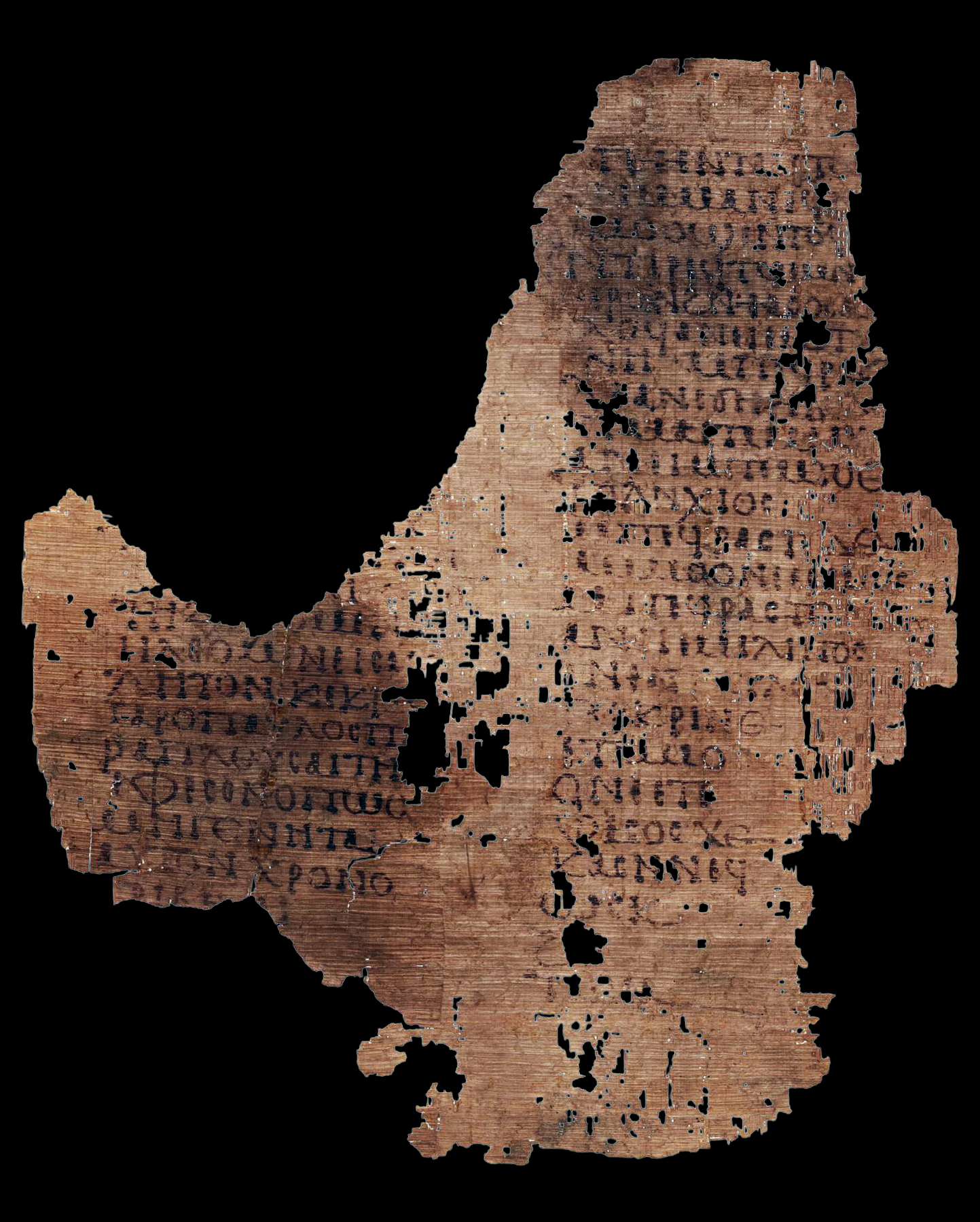
(K 7545) verso Acts 20, 15–16

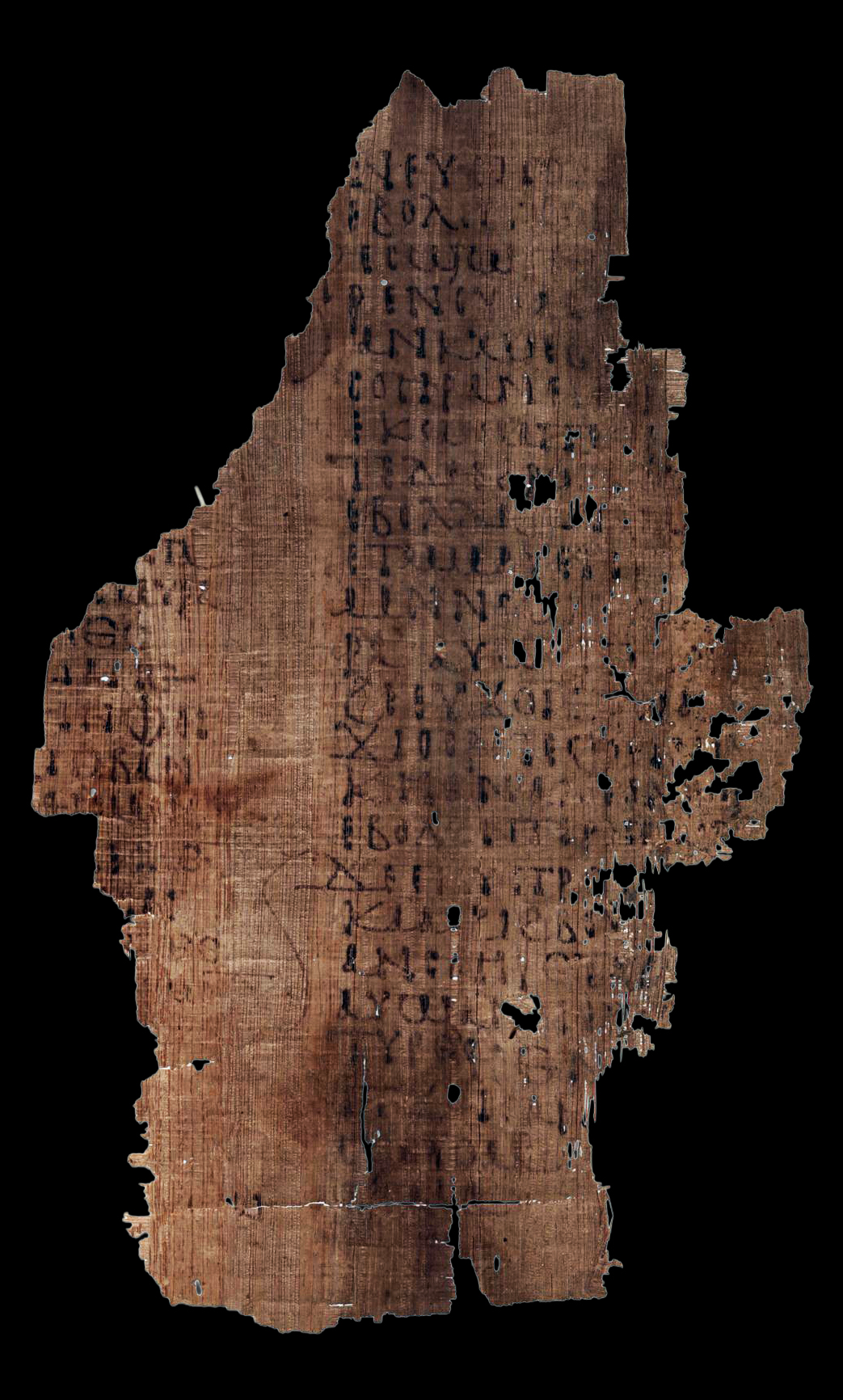
(K 7547) recto Acts 20, 35–38

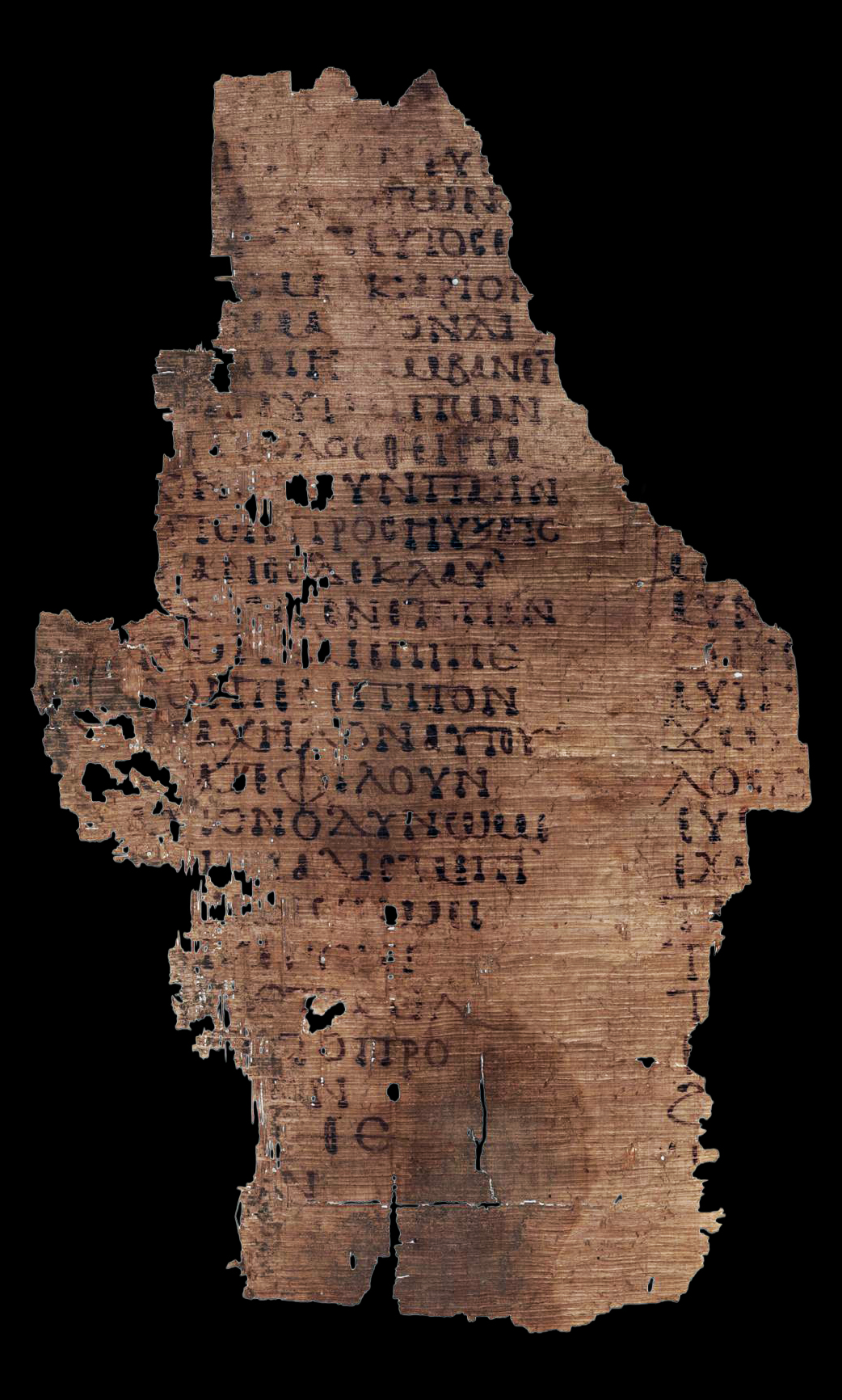
(K 7547) verso Acts 21, 1–3

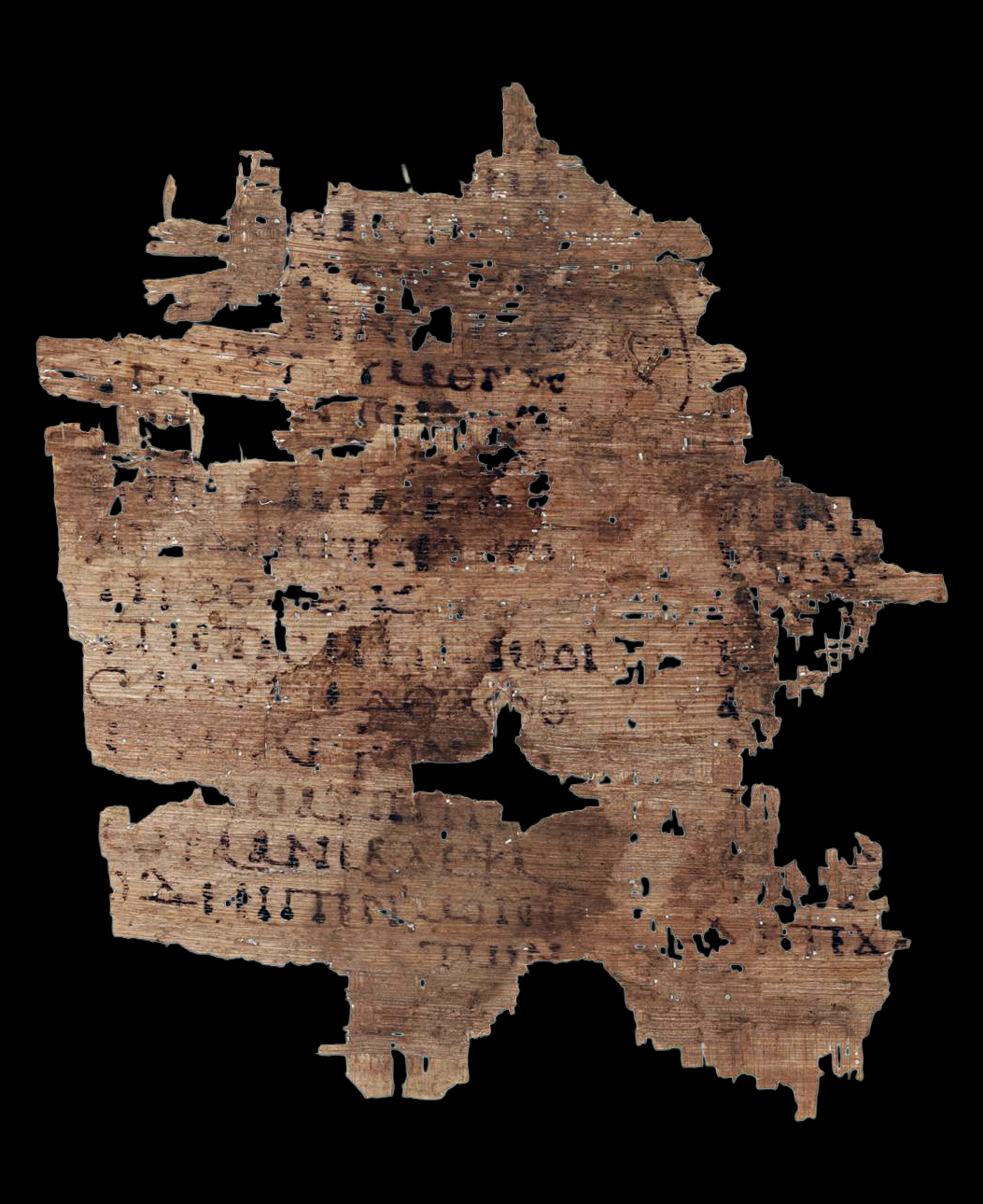
(K 7548) recto Acts 22, 11–14

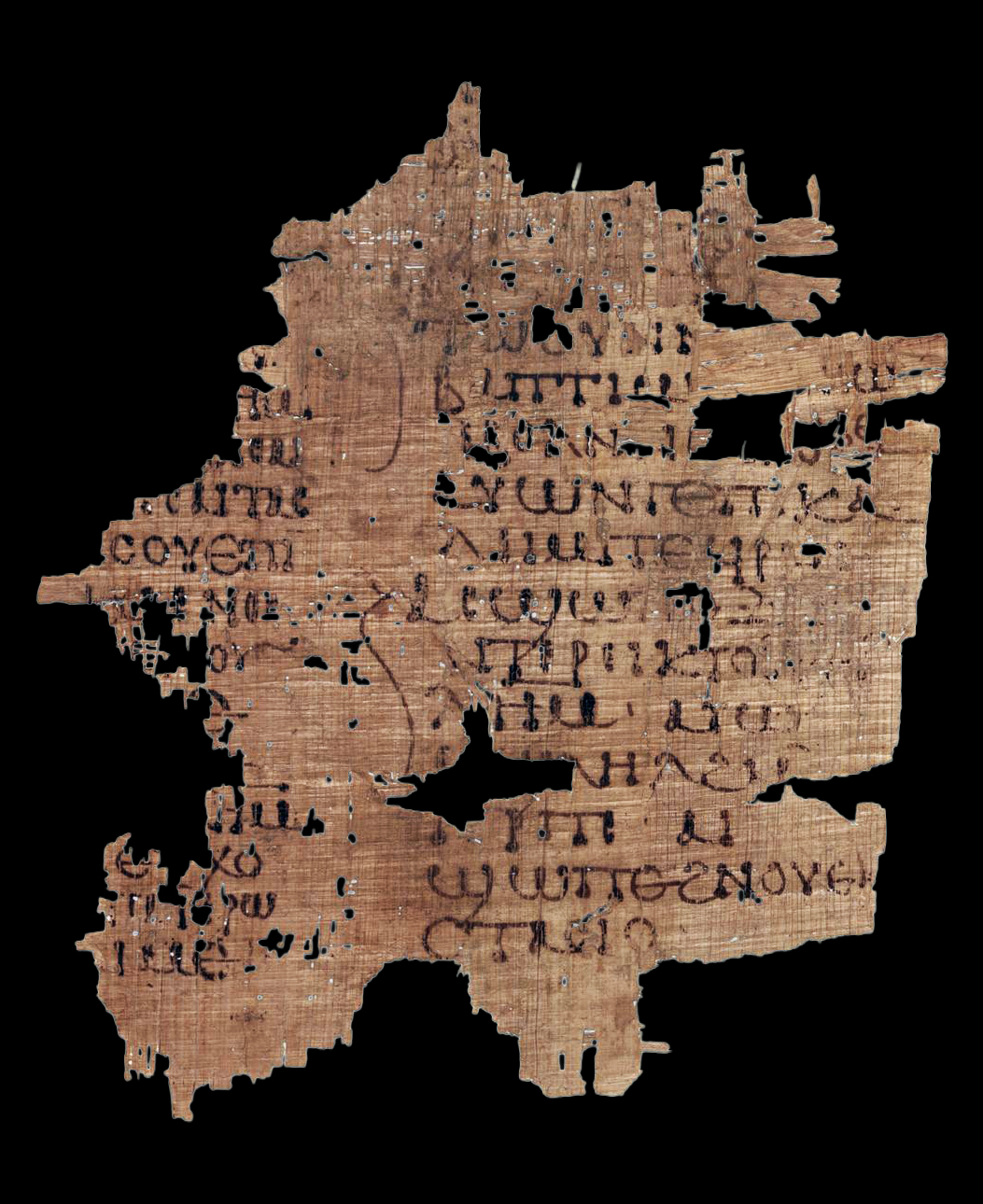
(K 7548) verso Acts 22, 16–17

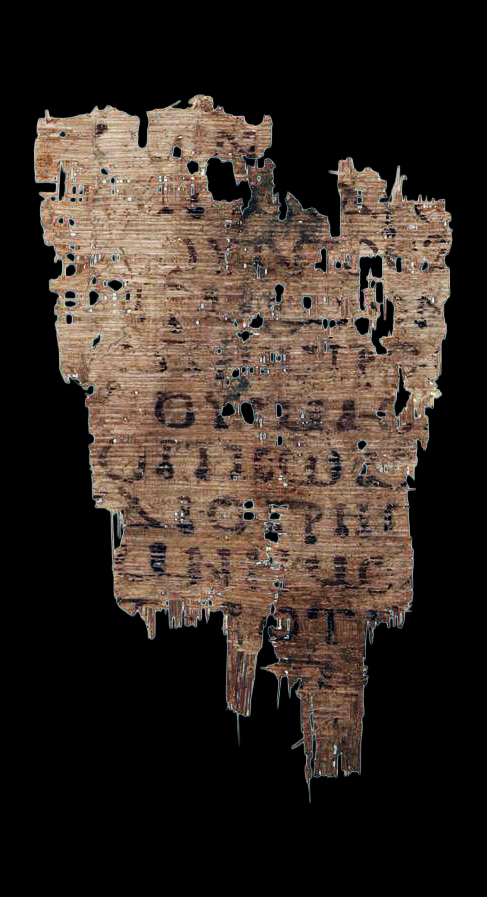
(K 7731) recto Acts 20, 28–31

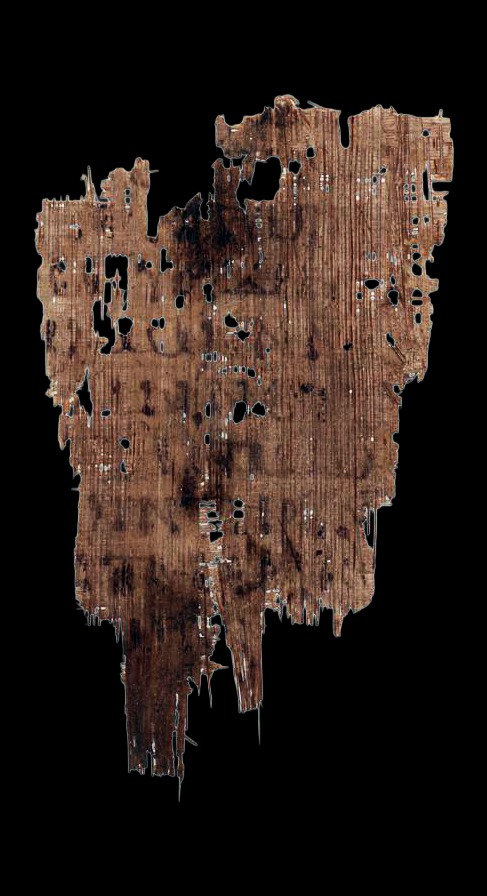
(K 7731) verso Acts 20, 32–35

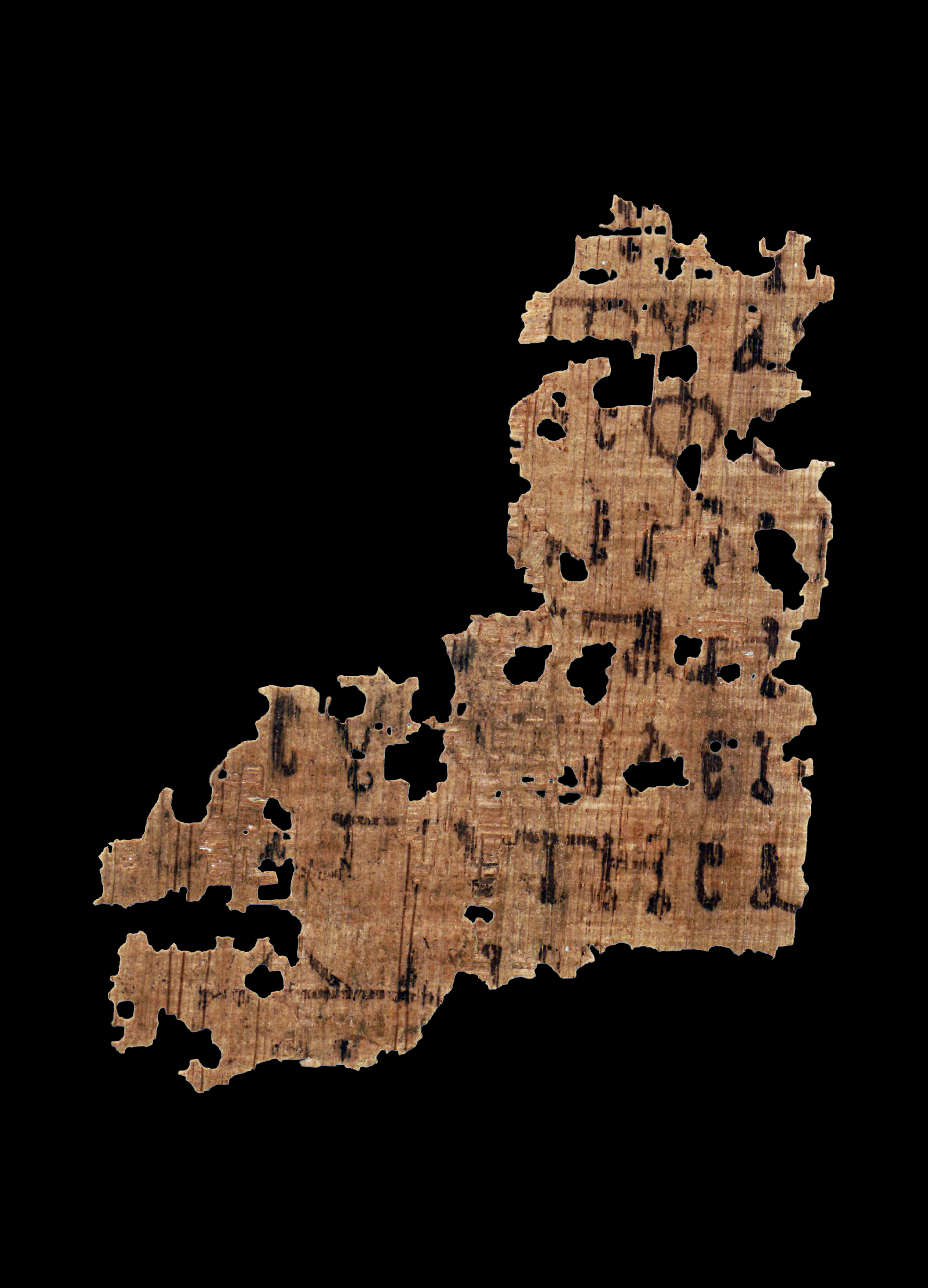
(K 7912) recto Acts 21, 24–25

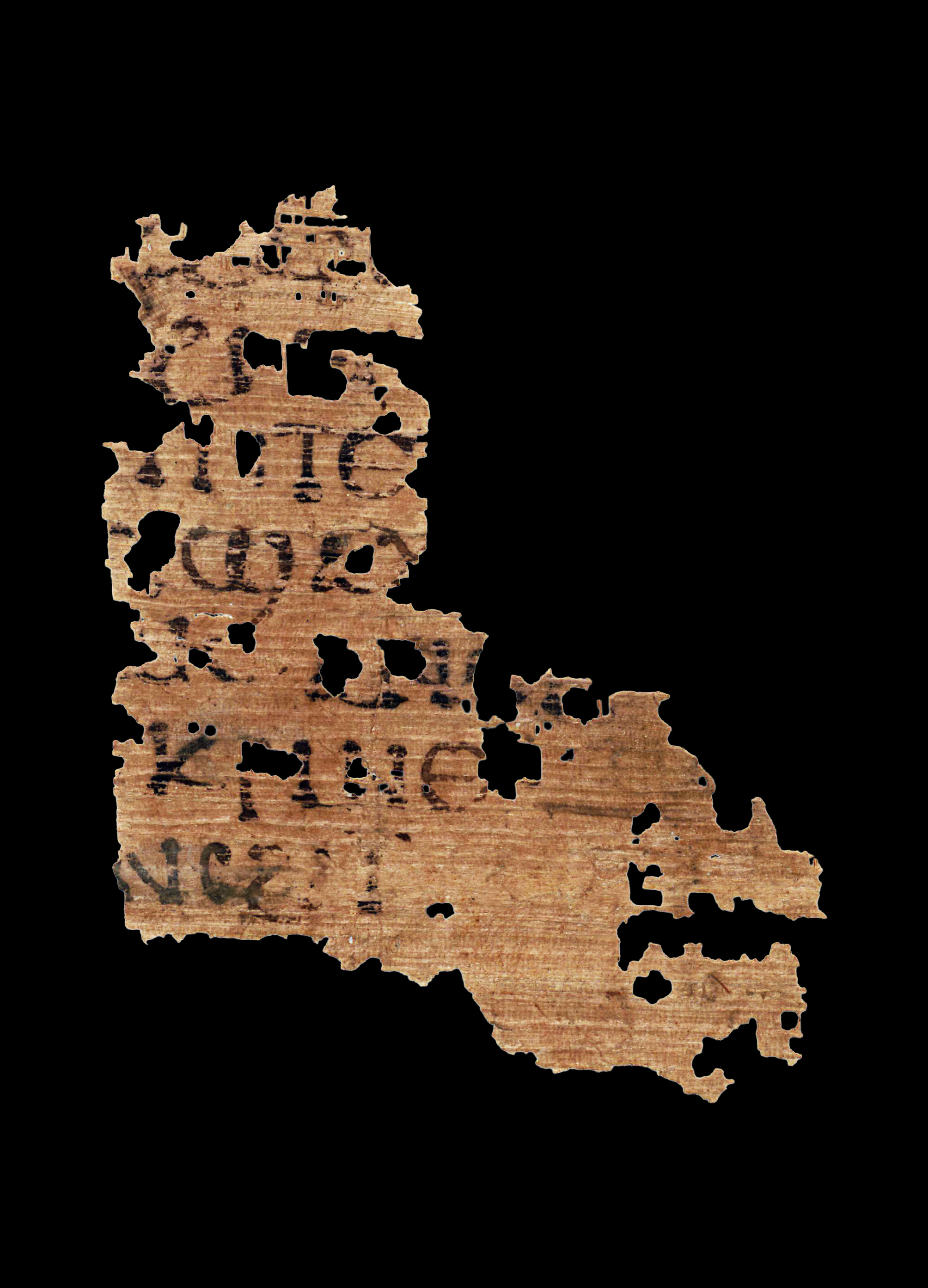
(K 7912) verso Acts 21, 26–27

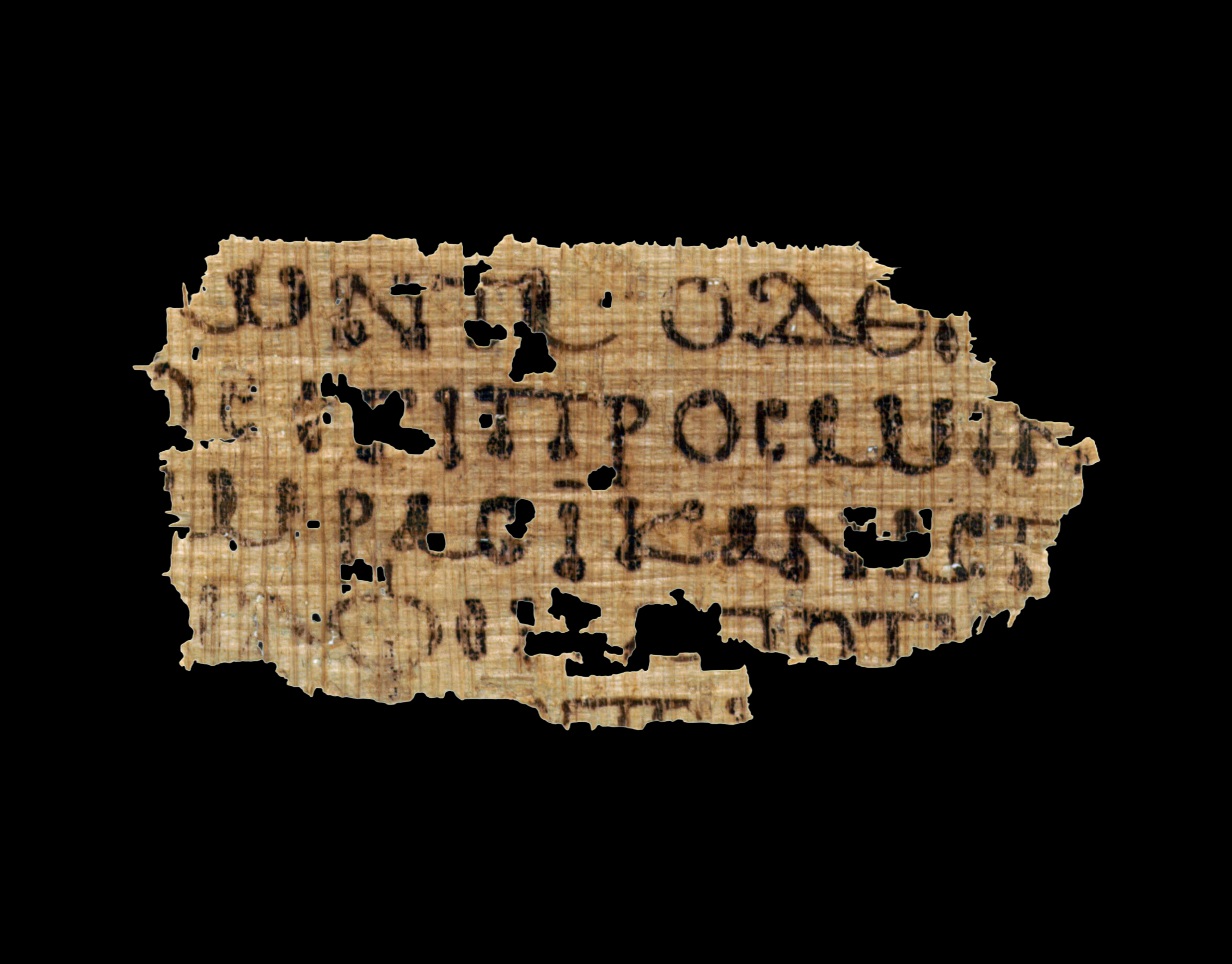
(K 7384) recto Acts 18, 21–23

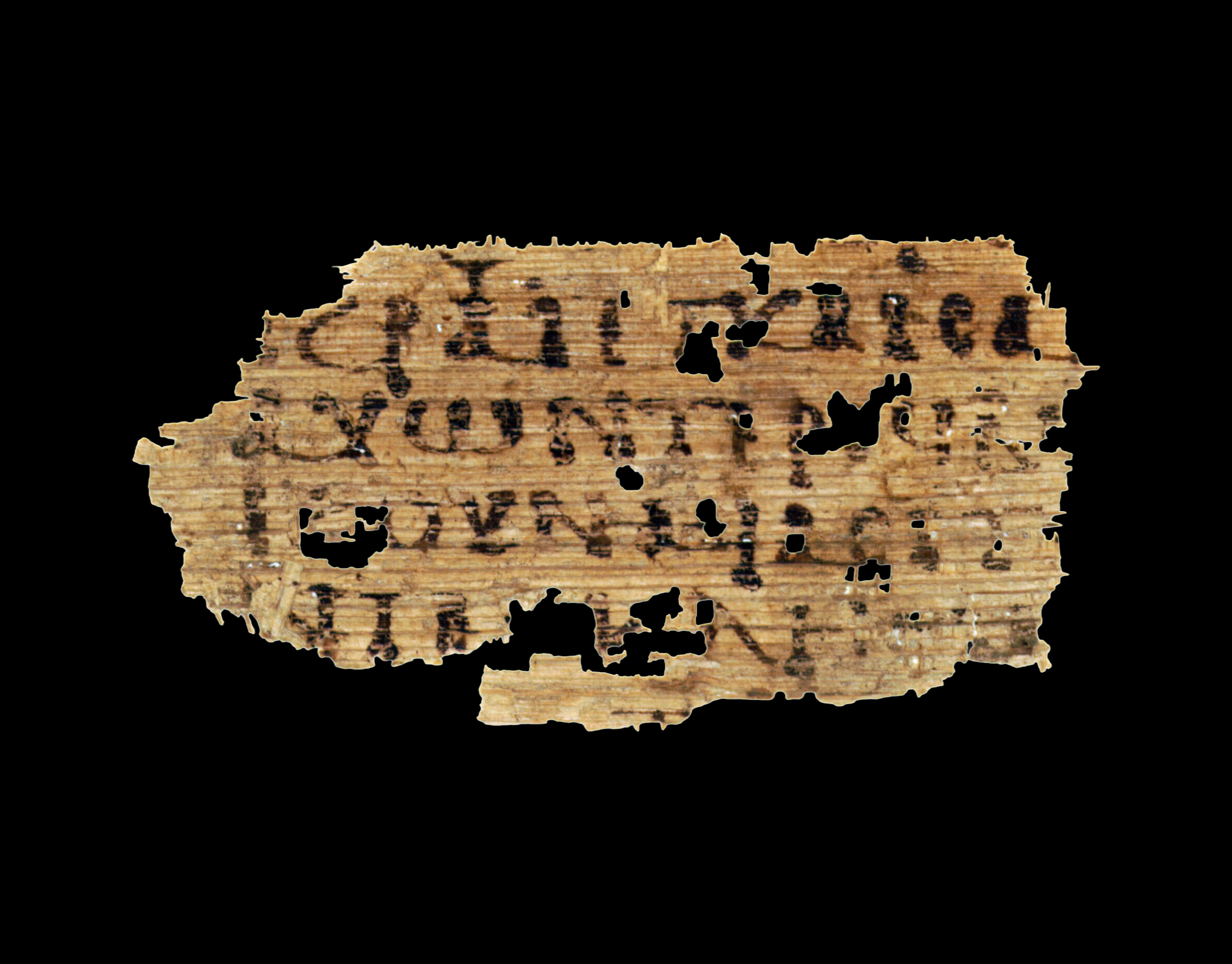
(K 7384) verso Acts 18, 17–18

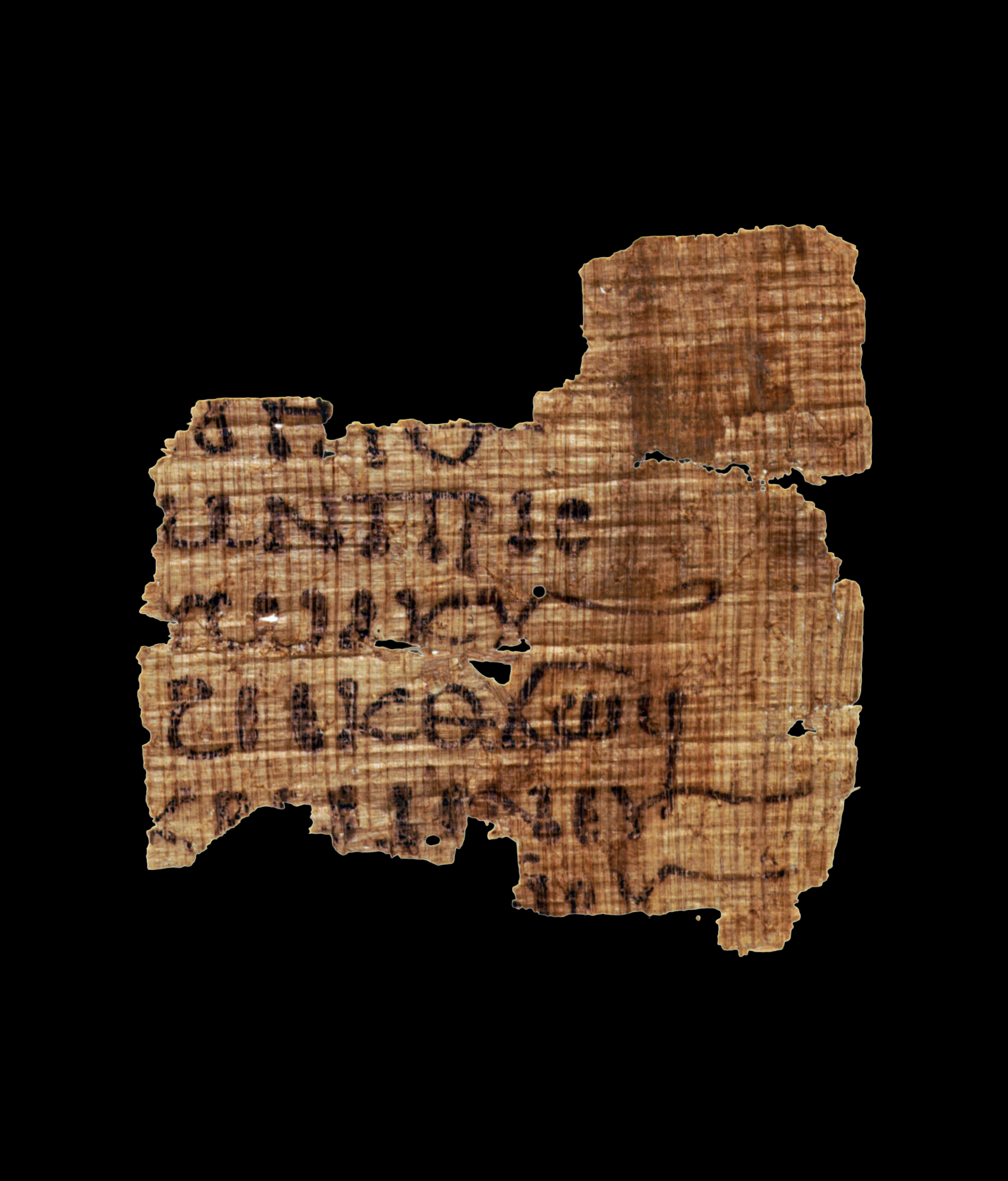
(K 7396) recto Acts 18, 21–23

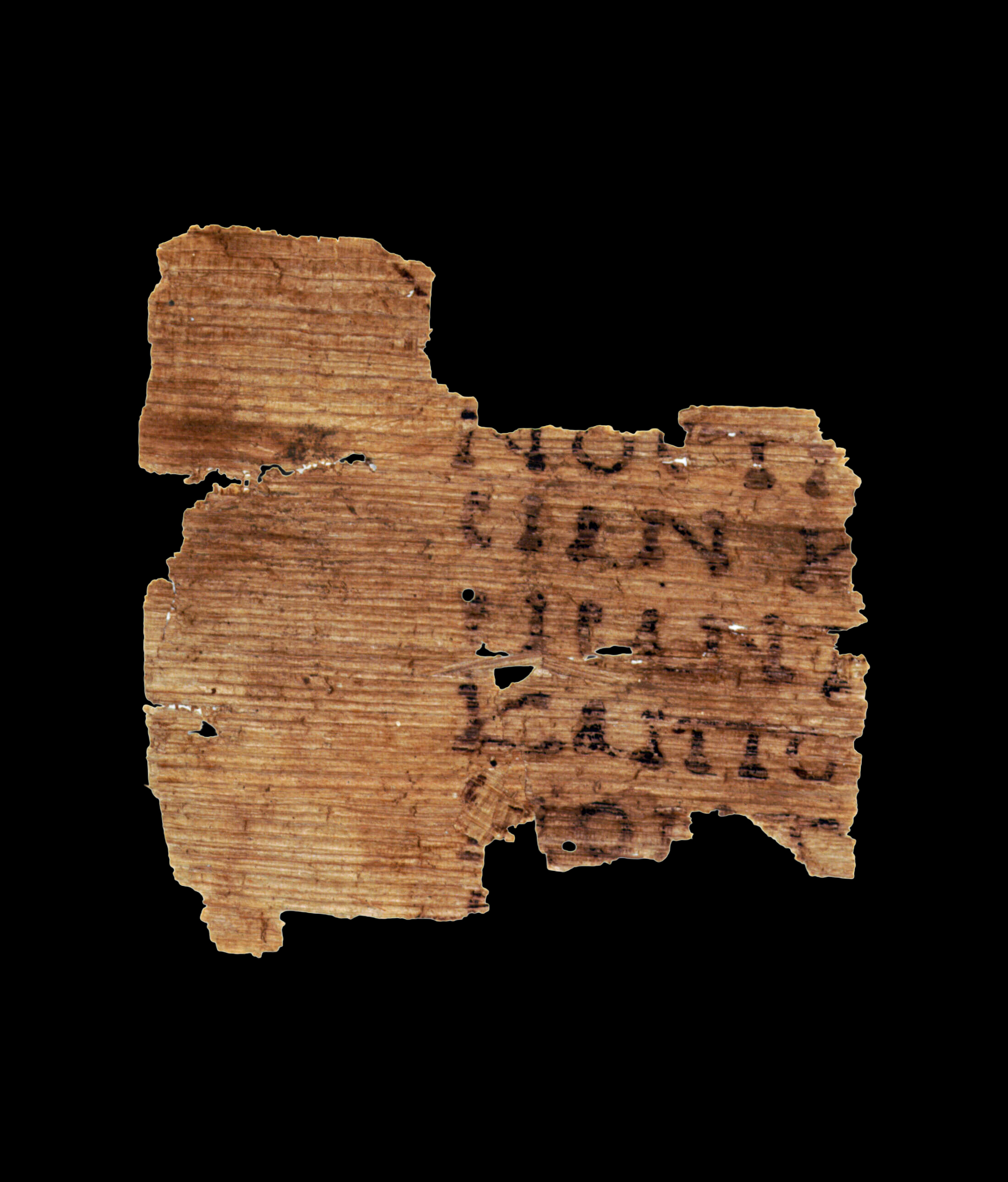
(K 7396) verso Acts 18, 17–18

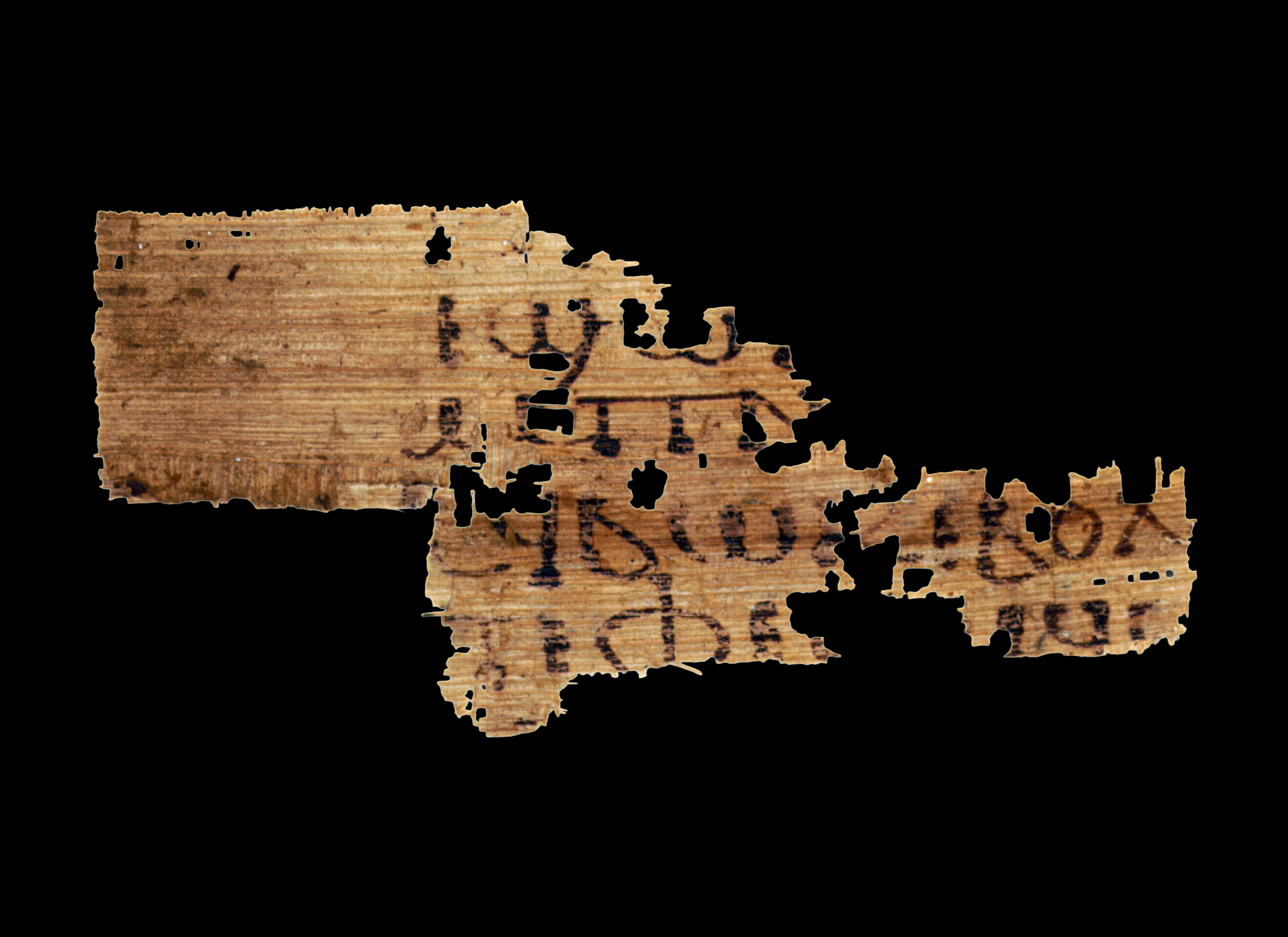
(K 7914) recto Acts 18, 21–23

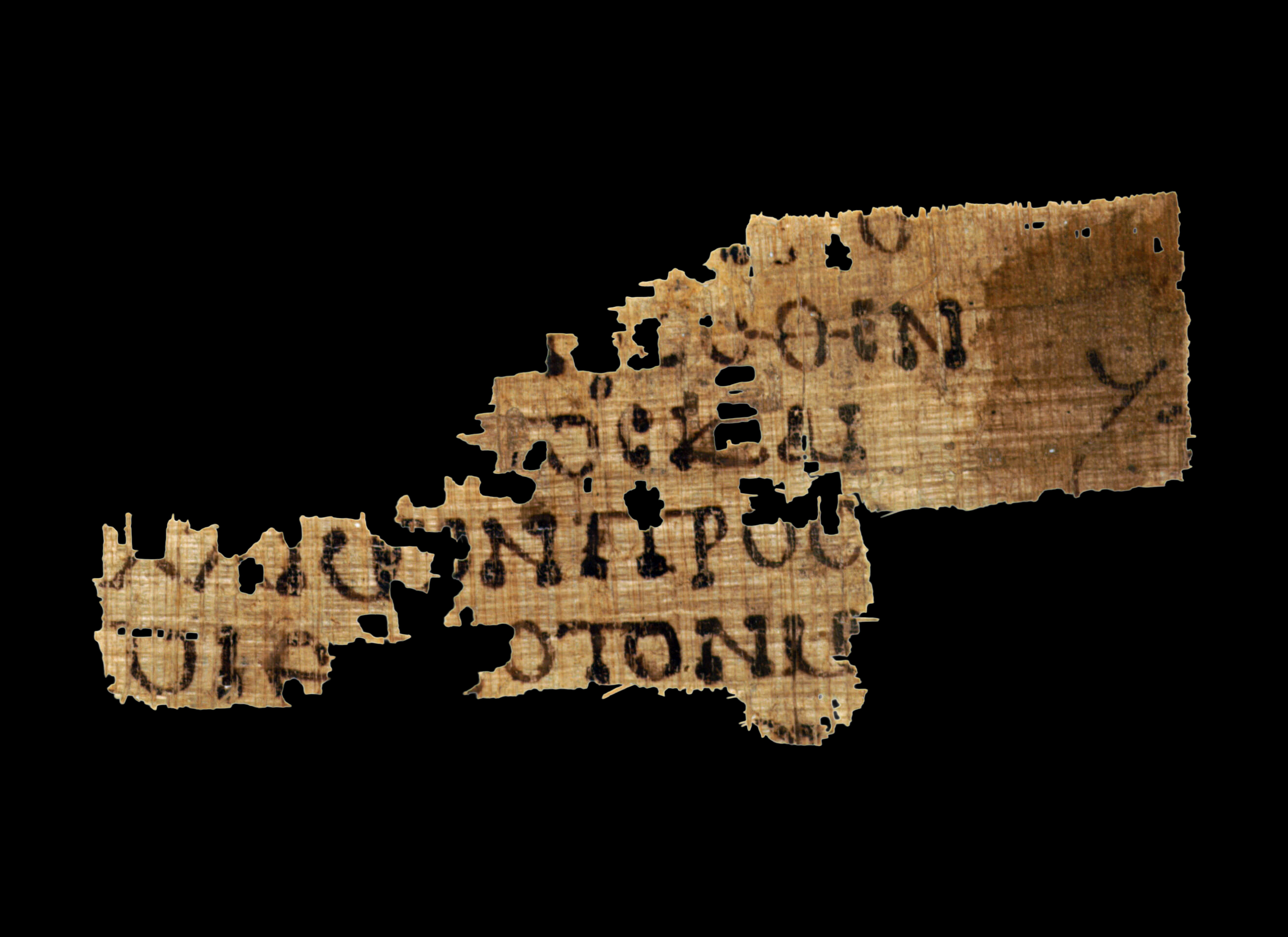
(K 7914) verso Acts 18, 17–18

== See also ==
- List of New Testament papyri
- Coptic versions of the Bible
