= Minuscule 255 =

- New Testament manuscript
- Text: Acts, Catholic epistles, Pauline epistles
- Date: 14th century
- Script: Greek
- Now at: Biblioteka Jagiellońska
- Size: 27 cm by 21 cm
- Category: none

Minuscule 255 (in the Gregory-Aland numbering), α^{174} (Soden), is a Greek minuscule manuscript of the New Testament, on parchment. Paleographically it has been assigned to the 13th century. Formerly it was labeled by 252^{a} and 302^{p}. Scrivener labelled it by 249^{a}.

== Description ==
The codex contains the text of the Acts of the Apostles, Catholic epistles, and Pauline epistles on 222 parchment leaves (27 cm by 21 cm). The text is written in 2 columns per page, 26 lines per page. It has the same contents as minuscule 303.

It contains prolegomena, tables of the κεφαλαια (tables of contents) before each sacred book, lectionary markings at the margin (for liturgical use), subscriptions at the end of each book, with numbers of στιχοι.

Kurt Aland the Greek text of the codex did not place in any Category.

1 Corinthians 2:14 it reads πνευματος (omit του θεου) along with 2, 216, 330, 440, 451, 823, 1827, and syr^{p}.

== History ==
The manuscript was examined and collated by Matthaei. Formerly it was labeled by 252^{a} and 302^{p}. Gregory saw it in 1887. In 1908 Gregory gave the number 255 to it.

Formerly it was held in Berlin (Königliche Bibliothek, Ms. Gr. Quarto 40).

At the end of 1943 year has increased the frequency of the bombing of Berlin. The Prussian State Library sent many collections out of Berlin to be sheltered in Silesia for safekeeping. As the result of postwar border changes some of these collections were found in Poland (among them Minuscule 255). They were moved to the Jagiellonian University Library.

The manuscript is currently housed at the Jagiellonian Library (Fonds der Berliner Hss. Graec. quarto 40) at Kraków.

== See also ==
- List of New Testament minuscules
- Biblical manuscript
- Textual criticism
- Minuscule 257
