= Francesco Del Furia =

Italian scholar and librarian

Francesco Del Furia (28 December 1777- 19 October 1856) was an Italian scholar and librarian of the Biblioteca Marucelliana in Florence.

== Biography ==
Del Furia was born in Pratovecchio in Tuscany, and there had his initial studies in the communal school. At the age of 11, because of his skills with Latin, he was brought to meet the librarian of the Laurentian Library, Angiolo Maria Bandini, who was vacationing in this town. With the encouragement of doctor Luigi Tramontanni and professor Migliorotto Maccioni, his parents were induced to allow him to move to Florence with Bandini. In 1792, he went to study in Pisa at the Seminary of Santa Caterina under the patronage of the Grand-Duke Ferdinand III. There he also learned Greek. In 1798, he moved to Florence to learn Hebrew, Syriac, and Arabic languages under Cesare Malanima and Padre Tacci. In 1801, he was named vice-librarian of the Marcelliana. Within a year he had added the same position from the Laurentian Library. In 1812 he was named a member of the Accademia della Crusca, and in 1814, secretary of the Accademia della Colombaria. In the meantime, the suppression of various monasteries including San Marco enlarged the ancient codex collections of the Laurentian Library. In addition collections of Scioppiani manuscripts, owned by Conte Pierucci, were bought. In 1820, the manuscripts of Francesco Redi were obtained, and in 1814, the autograph manuscripts of Vittorio Alfieri. Del Furia was involved in their translations and cataloguing.
