= Lectionary 114 =

Lectionary ℓ 114
- New Testament manuscript
- Text: Evangelistarion
- Date: 14th century
- Script: Greek
- Now at: Biblioteca Laurentiana
- Size: 34 cm by 26.2 cm
- Note: illuminated

Lectionary 114, designated by siglum ℓ 114 (in the Gregory-Aland numbering) is a Greek manuscript of the New Testament, on parchment leaves. Palaeographically it has been assigned to the 14th century.

== Description ==
The codex contains Lessons from the Gospels of John, Matthew, Luke lectionary (Evangelistarium). It is written in Greek minuscule letters, on 180 parchment leaves (34 cm by 26.2 cm), in 2 columns per page, 18 lines per page. According to Scrivener the manuscript is magnificently illuminated.

It contains Menologion to few names.

== History ==
The manuscript was added to the list of New Testament manuscripts by Scholz.

The manuscript is not cited in the critical editions of the Greek New Testament (UBS3).

Currently the codex is located in the Biblioteca Laurentiana (Plutei VI.7) in Florence.

== See also ==
- List of New Testament lectionaries
- Biblical manuscript
- Textual criticism
