= Lectionary 116 =

Lectionary ℓ 116
- New Testament manuscript
- Text: Evangelistarion
- Date: 10th century
- Script: Greek
- Now at: Biblioteca Laurentiana
- Size: 30.5 cm by 22.8 cm

Lectionary 116, designated by siglum ℓ 116 (in the Gregory-Aland numbering) is a Greek manuscript of the New Testament, on parchment leaves. Palaeographically it has been assigned to the 10th century.

== Description ==
The codex contains lessons from the Gospels of John, Matthew, Luke lectionary (Evangelistarium), on 226 parchment leaves (30.5 cm by 22.8 cm). It is written in Greek uncial letters, in 2 columns per page, 20 lines per page, 12–15 letters in line. It contains musical notes. It is elegantly written.

== History ==
The manuscript was added to the list of New Testament manuscripts by Scholz.

The manuscript is not cited in the critical editions of the Greek New Testament (UBS3).

Currently the codex is located in the Biblioteca Laurentiana (Plutei VI.31) in Florence.

== See also ==
- List of New Testament lectionaries
- Biblical manuscript
- Textual criticism
