= List of New Testament minuscules (2501–2600) =

List of small portions of the New Testament written in small, cursive Greek script

A New Testament minuscule is a copy of a portion of the New Testament written in a small, cursive Greek script (developed from Uncial).

== Legend ==
- The numbers (#) are the now standard system of Caspar René Gregory, often referred to as the Gregory-Aland numbers.
- Included among the cataloged minuscules are the following types of manuscripts, color coded:

Grey represents continuous text manuscripts containing only New Testament portions
Beige represents manuscripts with New Testament portions and a catena (quotations from church fathers)
Light cyan represents manuscripts of single-author commentaries who included the full Scripture text.
Light red represents manuscripts of single-author commentaries who included both the full Scripture text and a catena.
Light purple represents manuscripts of commentaries where the Scripture text was abridged.
White represents manuscript numbers no longer in use.

- Dates are estimated to the nearest 100 year increment where specific date is unknown.
- Content generally only describes sections of the New Testament: Gospels, The Acts of the Apostles (Acts), Pauline epistles, and so on. Sometimes the surviving portion of a codex is so limited that specific books, chapters or even verses can be indicated. Linked articles, where they exist, generally specify content in detail, by verse.
- Digital images are referenced with direct links to the hosting web pages, with the exception of those at the INTF. The quality and accessibility of the images is as follows:

Gold color indicates high resolution color images available online.
Tan color indicates high resolution color images available locally, not online.
Light tan color indicates only a small fraction of manuscript pages with color images available online.
Light gray color indicates black/white or microfilm images available online.
Light blue color indicates manuscript not imaged, and is currently lost or ownership unknown.
Light pink color indicates manuscript destroyed, presumed destroyed, or deemed too fragile to digitize.
Violet color indicates high resolution ultraviolet images available online.

† Indicates the manuscript has damaged or missing pages.
^{P} Indicates only a portion of the books were included.
^{K} Indicates manuscript also includes a commentary.
^{S} Indicates lost portions of manuscript replaced via supplement of a later hand.
^{abs} (abschrift) Indicates manuscript is copy.
[ ] Brackets around Gregory-Aland number indicate the manuscript belongs to an already numbered manuscript, was found to not be a continuous text manuscript, was found to be written in modern Greek versus Koine Greek, was proved a forgery, or has been destroyed.

== Minuscules 2501–2600 ==
#	Date	Contents	Pages	Institution and refs.	City, State	Country	Images
2501	16th	Acts, Pauline Epistles, General Epistles	295	Saint Catherine's Monastery, Gr. 2051	Sinai	Egypt	LOC, INTF, CSNTM
2502	13th	Gospels†, Acts†, Pauline Epistles†, General Epistles†	131	Saint Catherine's Monastery, Gr. 2123	Sinai	Egypt	LOC, CSNTM
2503	14th	Gospels	233	Saint Catherine's Monastery, Gr. 2252	Sinai	Egypt	LOC, CSNTM
[2504]=1176							
2505	10th	Acts, General Epistles, Pauline Epistles	195	Ecumenical Patriarchate, 6	Istanbul	Turkey	
2506	13th	Gospels	245	Ecumenical Patriarchate, Chalki, Kamariotissis, 92 (95)	Istanbul	Turkey	
2507	12th	Gospels	305	Ecumenical Patriarchate, Skevophylakion, 5	Istanbul	Turkey	INTF
2508	14th	Gospels†, Acts†, General Epistles†, Pauline Epistles†	382	National Library, 20	Athens	Greece	INTF
2509	10th-11th	Gospels	299	National Library, 49	Athens	Greece	INTF
2510	13th	Gospels	337	National Library, 54	Athens	Greece	INTF
2511	14th	Acts, General Epistles, Pauline Epistles	273	Great Lavra Monastery, H' 114a	Mount Athos	Greece	INTF
2512	15th	Gospels	291	Skete of Kavsokalyvia, 89	Mount Athos	Greece	
2513	13th	Gospels	147	A. de Meibohm, 1	Chios	Greece	
2514	12th	Gospels	305	State Archives, Kod. GJ. 79	Tirana	Albania	CSNTM, INTF
2515	13th	Gospels	223	Village Library, 26	Dimitsana	Greece	INTF
2516	13th	Gospels†, Acts†, General Epistles†, Pauline Epistles†	278	Village Library, 27	Dimitsana	Greece	INTF
2517	11th	Gospels†	109	Ch. G. Sarros, 1	Athens	Greece	INTF
2518	14th	Gospels	228	Ch. G. Sarros, 2	Athens	Greece	INTF
2519	11th	John	1	Ch. G. Sarros, 18, 1	Athens	Greece	INTF
2520	13th	Gospels	296	Byzantine and Christian Museum, 147	Athens	Greece	INTF
2521	17th	Gospels	202	Byzantine and Christian Museum, 160	Athens	Greece	CSNTM
2522	13th	Gospels†	113	Byzantine and Christian Museum, 161	Athens	Greece	INTF
2523	15th	Gospels, Acts, General Epistles, Pauline Epistles	266	National Library, 2720	Athens	Greece	CSNTM
2523	15th	Gospels, Acts, General Epistles, Pauline Epistles	266	National Library, 2720	Athens	Greece	INTF
2524	14th	Gospels†	159	National Library, 2736	Athens	Greece	CSNTM
2525	13th	Gospels†	171	National Library, 2739	Athens	Greece	CSNTM
2526	14th	Gospels†	97	National Library, 2749	Athens	Greece	CSNTM
2527	14th	General Epistles†, Pauline Epistles†	121	National Library, 2760	Athens	Greece	CSNTM
2527	14th	General Epistles†, Pauline Epistles†	121	National Library, 2760	Athens	Greece	INTF
2528	13th-14th	Gospels	162	National Library, 2982	Athens	Greece	CSNTM
2528	13th-14th	Gospels	162	National Library, 2982	Athens	Greece	INTF
2529	12th-13th	Gospels†	100	Russian State Library, F.181.13 (Gr. 13)	Moscow	Russia	INTF
2530	1321	Gospels	286	Russian State Library, F.247.926 (Gr. 15)	Moscow	Russia	INTF
2531	10th	John†	1	Cambridge University Library, Dd. 3.50frag., fol. 160	Cambridge	United Kingdom	
[2532]=[288]							
2533	1271	Gospels	165	The Van Kampen Foundation, VK 903	(Unknown)	United States	CSNTM, INTF
2534	11th-12th	Mark†, Luke†	73	Library of the Russian Academy of Sciences, K'pel 73	Saint Petersburg	Russia	INTF
2535	11th-12th	Gospels†	97	Library of the Russian Academy of Sciences, K'pel 83	Saint Petersburg	Russia	INTF
2536	12th	Romans 1:1-5:12†	4	Library of the Russian Academy of Sciences, K'pel 90	Saint Petersburg	Russia	INTF
2537	12th-13th	Mark† 14:72-16:20, Luke†	8	The State Hermitage Museum, W 1162	Saint Petersburg	Russia	INTF
2538	13th	Zigabenus Commentary on Mark†	2	National Library of Russia, Gr. 664	Saint Petersburg	Russia	INTF
2539	11th	Gospels†	200	National Library of Russia, Gr. 667	Saint Petersburg	Russia	INTF
2540	13th	Luke† 24:39-53, John† 2:4-4:23; 9:34-11:12	6	National Library of Russia, Gr. 680	Saint Petersburg	Russia	INTF
2541	12th	Acts, General Epistles, Pauline Epistles	147	National Library of Russia, Gr. 693	Saint Petersburg	Russia	INTF
2542	13th	Matthew† 12:5-28:20, Mark, Luke 1:1-24:19†	168	National Library of Russia, Gr. 694	Saint Petersburg	Russia	INTF
2543	11th	John†	5	National Library of Russia, Gr. 776	Saint Petersburg	Russia	INTF
2544	16th	Acts, General Epistles, Pauline Epistles	200	National Library of Russia, Coll. D . Kirillo-Belozersky Monastery 120/125	Saint Petersburg	Russia	INTF
2545	10th	Gospels	235	State Historical Museum, 3644	Moscow	Russia	INTF
2546	12th	Gospels	220	State Historical Museum, 3646	Moscow	Russia	INTF
2547	12th	John†	2	Russian State Library, F.270.1a.73.2 (Gr. 170.2)	Moscow	Russia	INTF
2548	13th	Luke†	8	Russian State Library, F.270.1a.73.4 (Gr. 170.4)	Moscow	Russia	
2549	12th	Gospels†	8	Russian Academy of Sciences Branch, I. 114.1	Saint Petersburg	Russia	INTF
2549	12th	Gospels†	227	Vernadsky National Library of Ukraine, F. 72 (Gr. Sammlung), 1	Kyiv	Ukraine	INTF
2550	12th	Gospels	326	Odesa National Scientific Library, 567	Odesa	Ukraine	INTF
2551	13th	Matthew†, Luke†, John†	10	Mesrop Mashtots Institute of Ancient Manuscripts, 807, 919, 1197, 1249, 1251, 2105	Yerevan	Armenia	INTF
2552	12th	Luke†, John†	2	Mesrop Mashtots Institute of Ancient Manuscripts, 7168	Yerevan	Armenia	INTF
2553	12th	John†	>1	Mesrop Mashtots Institute of Ancient Manuscripts, 8546	Yerevan	Armenia	INTF
2554	14th	New Testament	382	National Museum of Art, Ms. 3 (Formerly: Romanian Academy, 3/12610)	Bucharest	Romania	INTF
2555	13th-14th	Gospels	262	National Museum of Art, Ms. 14 (Formerly: Romanian Academy, 14/126216)	Bucharest	Romania	INTF
[2556]=1873							
2557	12th	Matthew†, Mark† Luke†	129	Benaki Museum, MS 2	Athens	Greece	CSNTM, INTF
2558	13th	Acts†, General Epistles†, Pauline Epistles†	261	Benaki Museum, TA 34	Athens	Greece	CSNTM, INTF
2559	12th	Gospels†, (Matthew^{S})	261	Benaki Museum, TA 136	Athens	Greece	CSNTM, INTF
[2560]							
2561	11th	Gospels	294	Benaki Museum, MS 44	Athens	Greece	CSNTM, INTF
2562	12th	Gospels	189	Benaki Museum, MS 70	Athens	Greece	CSNTM, INTF
2563	11th	Matthew† 14:3-28:20, Mark, Luke, John 1:1-21:11†	168	Benaki Museum, TA 142	Athens	Greece	CSNTM, INTF
[2564]=ℓ2022							
[2565]=ℓ2023							
[2566]=ℓ2024							
2567	11th	Gospels†	241	State Archives, Ms 238	Athens	Greece	INTF
2568	13th	Matthew†, Mark† Luke†	5	Vatopedi Monastery, 1219, fol. 1-3.5-6	Mount Athos	Greece	INTF
2569	13th	John†	1	Vatopedi Monastery, 1219, fol. 4	Mount Athos	Greece	INTF
2570	12th	Acts† 1:13-24; 24:23-25:8; 1 Corinthians† 5:3-6:7	3	Vatopedi Monastery, 1219, fol. 9-11	Mount Athos	Greece	INTF
2571	11th	Gospels	264	Monastery of Paleokastritsa, Panagias 16	Corfu	Greece	INTF
2572	16th	Theophylact Commentary on the Pauline Epistles†	52	National Library, Panc. 171, fol.1-52	Florence	Italy	INTF
2573	16th	Theophylact Commentary on John†	183	Franzoniana Library, 21, fol. 119-301	Genoa	Italy	INTF
2574	12th	Chrysostom Commentary on Galatians 1:1-6:17†	54	Ambrosiana Library, A 172 sup., fol. 264-317	Milan	Italy	INTF
2575	16th	John†	172	Ambrosiana Library, A 184 sup.	Milan	Italy	INTF
2576	1286	Theophylact Commentary on Acts, Pauline Epistles	438	Ambrosiana Library, F 104 sup.	Milan	Italy	INTF
2577	14th	Theophylact Commentary on Matthew†	110	Ambrosiana Library, G 15 sup., fol. 74-183	Milan	Italy	INTF
2578	13th-14th	Theophylact Commentary on the Gospels	461	Ambrosiana Library, G 55 sup.	Milan	Italy	INTF
2579	16th	Matthew†, Mark†	281	Ambrosiana Library, D 161 inf., D 466 inf.	Milan	Italy	INTF
[2580]=837							
2581	17th	Matthew†,	122	Victor Emmanuel III National Library, ms. Branc.III.E. 13	Naples	Italy	INTF
2582	14th	Revelation	14	Vatican Library, Vat.gr.1908, fol. 105-118	Vatican City	Vatican City	DVL, INTF
2583	17th	Theophylact Commentary on Matthew†	17	Vatican Library, Vat.gr.2275, fol. 137-153	Vatican City	Vatican City	DVL, INTF
2584	13th	Mark†, Luke†, John†	98	Vatican Library, Vat.gr.2319	Vatican City	Vatican City	INTF
2585	11th	Gospels†	183	Vatican Library, Vat.gr.2330	Vatican City	Vatican City	DVL, INTF
2586	11th	Matthew† 5:25-28:20, Mark, Luke, John	243	Vatican Library, Vat.gr.2398	Vatican City	Vatican City	INTF
2587	11th	Acts† 5:1-28:31, General Epistles, Pauline Epistles	237	Vatican Library, Vat.gr.2503, fol. 1-237	Vatican City	Vatican City	DVL, INTF
2588	13th	Luke† 19:13-38	1	Vatican Library, Vat.gr.2503, fol. 238	Vatican City	Vatican City	DVL, INTF
2589	11th	Matthew† 11:29-12:31	1	Vatican Library, Vat.gr.2503, fol. 239	Vatican City	Vatican City	DVL, INTF
2590	13th	Gospels	239	Vatican Library, Vat.gr.2561	Vatican City	Vatican City	DVL, INTF
2591	15th	Gospels	304	Vatican Library, Vat.gr.2562	Vatican City	Vatican City	INTF
2592	11th	Gospels	261	Vatican Library, Vat.gr.2564	Vatican City	Vatican City	INTF
2593	14th	Luke† (Nicetas Catena)	289	Vatican Library, Vat.gr.2573	Vatican City	Vatican City	INTF
2594	16th	Andreas of Caesarea Commentary on Revelation†	58	Turin National University Library, C.III.8	Turin	Italy	INTF
2595	15th	Andreas of Caesarea Commentary on Revelation	16	Marciana National Library, Gr. Z. 494 (331), fol. 248-263	Venice	Italy	INTF
2596	11th	Chrysostom Commentary on Galatians† 1:16-6:18	54	Marciana National Library, Gr. II,178 (1051), fol. 1-54	Venice	Italy	INTF
2597	16th	Theophylact Commentary on Matthew†	47	Marciana National Library, Gr. I,39 (1144), fol. 1-47	Venice	Italy	INTF
2598	13th-14th	Gospels	323	National and University Library, Ms. 1916	Strasbourg	France	BnF, CSNTM
2598	13th-14th	Gospels	323	National and University Library, Ms. 1916	Strasbourg	France	INTF
2599	13th	Luke†	1	Royal Library of Belgium, II 2404, 4	Brussels	Belgium	
2600	13th	Luke† 20:19-24:53, John†	46	Abbey Library, T. 277	Linköping	Sweden	INTF

[top]

== See also ==
- List of New Testament papyri
- List of New Testament uncials
- List of New Testament minuscules (1–1000)
- List of New Testament minuscules (1001–2000)
- List of New Testament minuscules (2001–)
- List of New Testament minuscules ordered by Location/Institution
- List of New Testament lectionaries

== Bibliography ==
- Aland, Kurt; M. Welte; B. Köster; K. Junack (1994). Kurzgefasste Liste der griechischen Handschriften des Neues Testaments. Berlin, New York: Walter de Gruyter. p. 95. ISBN 3-11-011986-2.
- "Liste Handschriften". Münster: Institute for New Testament Textual Research.
