= Uncial 0173 =

- New Testament manuscript
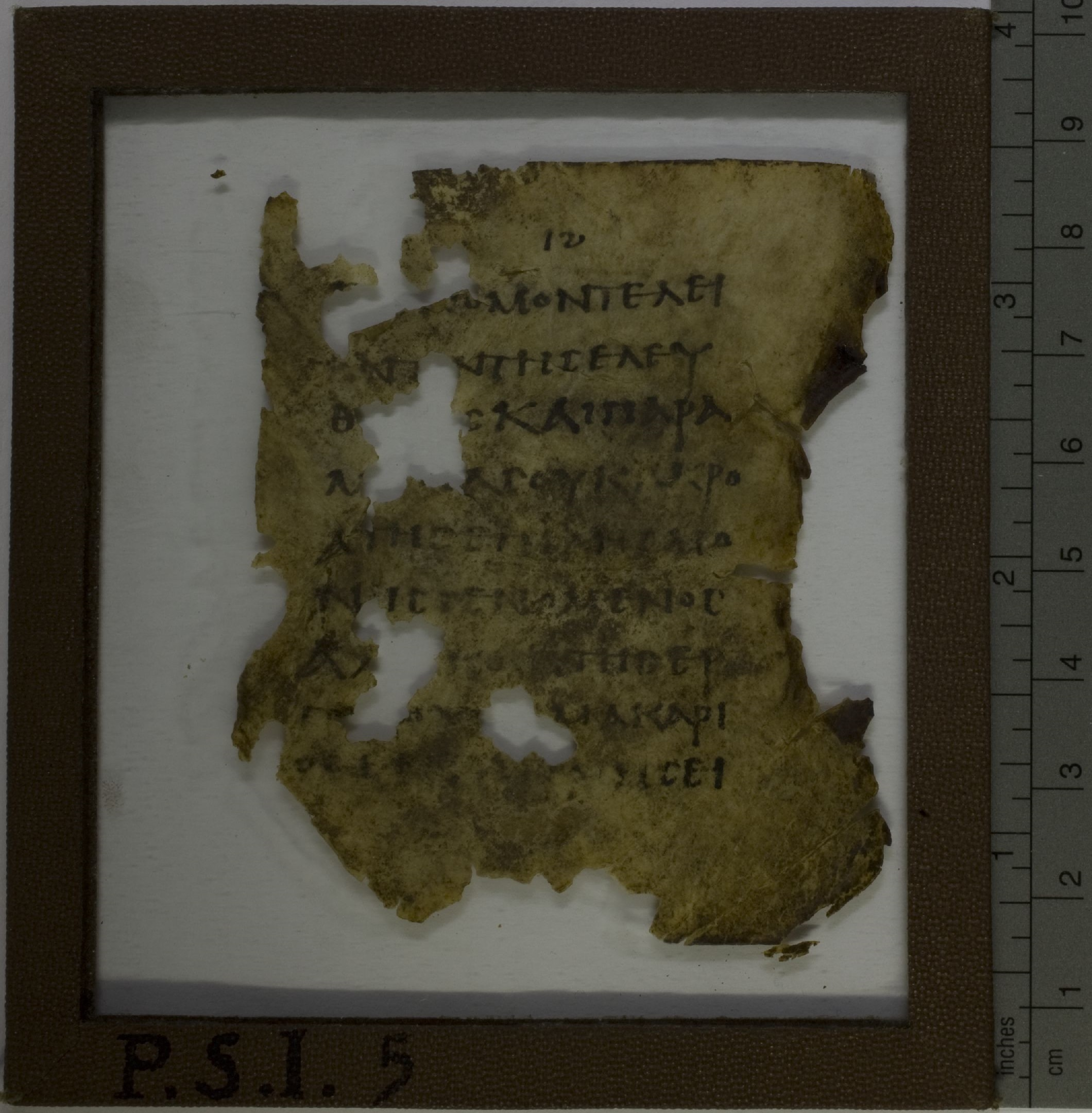
- Text: James 1:25-27
- Date: 5th century
- Script: Greek
- Now at: Laurentian Library
- Size: 8 x 6.5 cm
- Type: Alexandrian text-type
- Category: II

Uncial 0173 (in the Gregory-Aland numbering), is a Greek uncial manuscript of the New Testament, dated paleographically to the 5th century.

== Description ==
The codex contains a small part of the Epistle of James 1:25-27, on one parchment leaf (8 cm by 6.5 cm). It is written in one column per page, 9 lines per page, in uncial letters.

The Greek text of this codex is a representative of the Alexandrian text-type. Aland placed it in Category II.

Currently it is dated by the INTF to the 5th century.

The text was published by Ermenegildo Pistelli and Mario Naldini.

The codex currently is housed at the Laurentian Library (PSI 5) in Florence.

== See also ==
- List of New Testament uncials
- Textual criticism
