= Minuscule 836 =

- New Testament manuscript
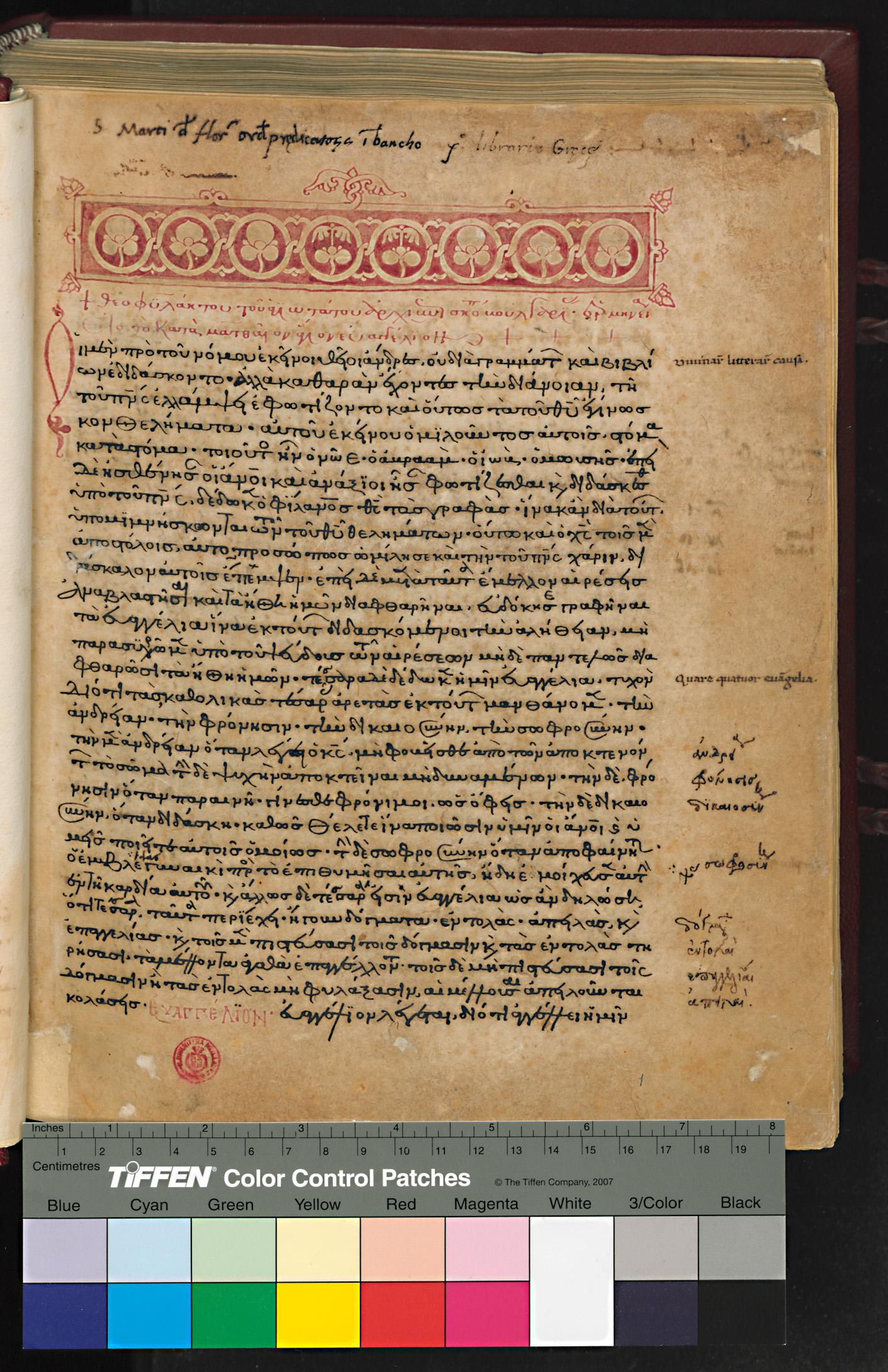
- Folio 1 recto
- Text: Gospels †
- Date: 14th century
- Script: Greek
- Now at: Laurentian Library
- Size: 28 cm by 22.6 cm
- Type: Byzantine text-type
- Category: V
- Note: commentary

Minuscule 836 (in the Gregory-Aland numbering), Θ^{ε46} (von Soden), is a 14th-century Greek minuscule manuscript of the New Testament on paper. The manuscript is not complete, it lacks Gospel of Luke.

== Description ==
The codex contains the text of the Gospel of Matthew, Gospel of Mark, and Gospel of John on 277 paper leaves (size 28 cm by 22.6 cm). The text is written in one column per page, 33 lines per page. The headpieces are in red.

The text is divided according to the κεφαλαια (chapters), whose numbers are given at the margin, and their τιτλοι (titles of chapters) at the top of the pages. It has some notes at the margin.

It contains a commentary of Theophylact.

== Text ==
The Greek text of the codex is a representative of the Byzantine text-type. Kurt Aland placed it in Category V.

It was not examined by the Claremont Profile Method.

Textual variants

- Matthew 1:3b-4a δε εγεννησε τον Αραμ. Αραμ δε εγεννησε τον Αμιναδαβ, Αμιναδαβ δε εγεννησε ] omit
- Matthew 1:24 – διεγερθεις δε ο Ιωσεφ απο ] διεγερθεις δε α απο

== History ==
C. R. Gregory dated the manuscript to the 14th century. Currently the manuscript is dated by the INTF to the 14th century. The manuscript once belonged to the Convent of S. Marco de Florentia des Predigerordens as minuscule 196.

The manuscript was examined and described by Angelo Maria Bandini. It was added to the list of New Testament manuscripts by Gregory (836^{e}). Gregory saw it in 1886. It was digitized in 2009.

Currently the manuscript is housed at the Laurentian Library (Plutei XI. 18), in Florence.

== See also ==
- List of New Testament minuscules
- Minuscule 835
- Minuscule 837
- Biblical manuscript
- Textual criticism
