= Lectionary 117 =

Lectionary ℓ 117
- New Testament manuscript
- Text: Evangelistarion
- Date: 11th century
- Script: Greek
- Now at: Biblioteca Laurentiana
- Size: 33.6 cm by 27.5 cm
- Hand: beautifully written
- Note: illuminated

Lectionary 117, designated by siglum ℓ 117 (in the Gregory-Aland numbering), is a Greek manuscript of the New Testament, on parchment leaves. Palaeographically it has been assigned to the 11th century.

== Description ==
The codex contains lessons for selected days only from the Gospel of John lectionary (Evangelistarium), on 119 parchment leaves (33.6 cm by 27.5 cm). The text is written in Greek minuscule letters, in 2 columns per page, 10 lines per page. It contains Menologion and pictures.

According to Scrivener the manuscript is most beautifully written in gold ink.

== History ==
The manuscript was brought by Micheal Collurenites from Constantinople to Trapezunt. In 1330 it was brought back to Constantinople. The manuscript was added to the list of New Testament manuscripts by Scholz. It was examined by Bandini (along with ℓ 118), Birch, and Scholz. Andrew Birch gave for it number 38.

The manuscript is not cited in the critical editions of the Greek New Testament (UBS3).

Currently, the codex is located in the Biblioteca Laurentiana (Med. Pal. 244) in Florence.

== See also ==
- List of New Testament lectionaries
- Biblical manuscript
- Textual criticism

== Bibliography ==
- Angelo Bandini, Illustratione de due evangeliari greci del secolo XI, Venedig 1787.
