= Minuscule 191 =

- New Testament manuscript
- Text: Gospels
- Date: 12th century
- Script: Greek
- Now at: Laurentian Library
- Size: 13.2 cm by 9.5 cm
- Type: Byzantine text-type
- Category: none
- Note: family K^{x}

Minuscule 191 is a Greek minuscule manuscript of the New Testament, written on parchment. It is designated by the siglum 191 in the Gregory-Aland numbering of New Testament manuscripts, and as ε 224 in the von Soden numbering of New Testament manuscripts. Using the study of comparative writing styles (palaeography), it has been assigned to the 12th century. It has marginal notes.

== Description ==
The manuscript is a codex (precursor to the modern book format), containing the complete text of the four Gospels on 180 parchment leaves (sized 13.2 cm by 9.5 cm). The text is written in one column per page, with 27 lines per page, in black ink.

The text is divided according to the chapters (known as κεφαλαια / kefalaia), whose numbers are given in the margin in Latin.

It contains a Prolegomena, αναγνωσεις (lessons – later hand), and subscriptions at the end of each book, with the numbers of lines (known as στιχοι / stichoi).

== Text ==
The Greek text of the codex is considered a representative of the Byzantine text-type. Hermann von Soden assigned it to the textual family K^{x}. Aland did not place it in any Category.

According to the Claremont Profile Method it belongs to the textual cluster M1326 along with the manuscripts 444, 1326, 1396, 2521. It is related to the cluster M106.

== History ==
The manuscript was examined by Bandini, Birch, Scholz, and Burgon. C. R. Gregory saw it in 1886.

It is currently housed at the Laurentian Library (Plutei. VI. 29), at Florence.

== See also ==
- List of New Testament minuscules
- Biblical manuscript
- Textual criticism
