= Minuscule 834 =

- New Testament manuscript
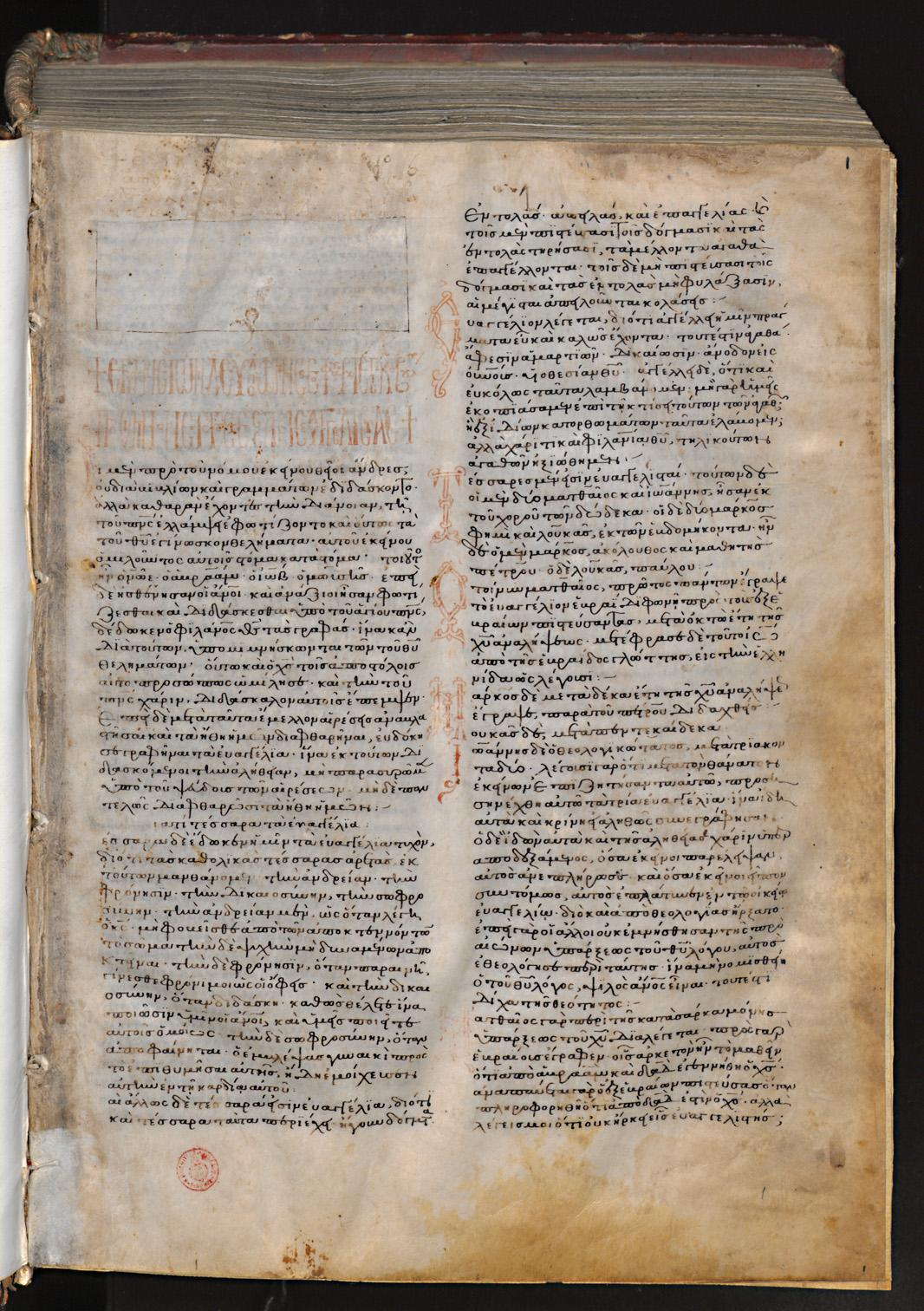
- Folio 1 recto
- Text: Gospels
- Date: 14th century
- Script: Greek
- Now at: Laurentian Library
- Size: 33.5 cm by 25.3 cm
- Type: Byzantine text-type
- Category: V
- Note: commentary

Minuscule 834 (in the Gregory-Aland numbering), Θ^{ε422} (von Soden), is a 14th-century Greek minuscule manuscript of the New Testament on parchment. The manuscript has complex contents.

== Description ==
The codex contains the text of the four Gospels, on 287 parchment leaves (size 33.5 cm by 25.3 cm). The text is written in two columns per page, 43 lines per page.

The text is divided according to the κεφαλαια (chapters), whose numbers are given at the margin, and their τιτλοι (titles) at the top of the pages. It contains Prolegomena, tables of the κεφαλαια (tables of contents) before each Gospel, subscriptions at the end of Matthew, versification in Luke.

It contains a commentary of Theophylact.

== Text ==
The Greek text of the codex is a representative of the Byzantine text-type. Kurt Aland placed it in Category V.

It was not examined by the Claremont Profile Method.

According to Gregory it could be rewritten from minuscule 835.

== History ==
Gregory dated the manuscript to the 14th century. Currently the manuscript is dated by the INTF to the 14th century.

The manuscript was examined and described by Angelo Maria Bandini. It was added to the list of New Testament manuscripts by Gregory (834^{e}). Gregory saw it in 1886.

Currently the manuscript is housed at the Laurentian Library (Plutei XI. 6), in Florence.

== See also ==
- List of New Testament minuscules
- Minuscule 833
- Minuscule 835
- Biblical manuscript
- Textual criticism
