= Uncial 0174 =

- New Testament manuscript
- Text: Galatians 2:5-6
- Date: 5th century
- Script: Greek
- Now at: Laurentian Library
- Size: 6 x 2.3 cm
- Type: unknown
- Category: none

Uncial 0174 (in the Gregory-Aland numbering), is a Greek uncial manuscript of the New Testament, dated paleographically to the 5th century.

== Description ==
The codex contains a very small part of the Epistle to the Galatians 2:5-6, on fragment of one parchment leaf (6 cm by 2.3 cm). The text is written in one column per page, 6 lines per page, in uncial letters. Verso side of a fragment is blank.

Currently it is dated by the INTF to the 5th century.

The Greek text of this codex is unknown. Text is too brief to classify. Aland did not placed it in any of Categories of New Testament manuscripts.

It was written in Egypt. It was found in Oxyrhynchos.

The codex currently is housed at the Laurentian Library (PSI 118) in Florence.

The text of this fragment was published by Ermenegildo Pistelli in 1913.

== See also ==
- List of New Testament uncials
- Textual criticism
