= Minuscule 837 =

14th-century Greek minuscule manuscript of the New Testament

- New Testament manuscript
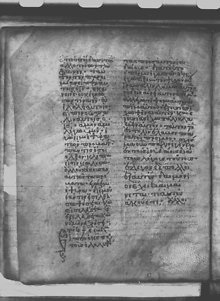
- Text: Gospel of Matthew †, Gospel of Mark †
- Date: 14th century
- Script: Greek
- Now at: Laurentian Library
- Size: 28.6 cm by 21.9 cm
- Type: ?
- Category: none
- Note: —

Minuscule 837 (in the Gregory-Aland numbering), ε415 (von Soden), is a 14th-century Greek minuscule manuscript of the New Testament on parchment. The manuscript is lacunose.

== Description ==
The codex contains the texts of the Gospel of Matthew (1:17-5:30; 17:24-24:29; 27:60-28:20) and Gospel of Mark (1:1-32), on 29 parchment leaves (size 28.6 cm by 21.9 cm). The text is written in two columns per page, 27 lines per page.

The text is divided according to the κεφαλαια (chapters), whose numbers are given at the margin, and their τιτλοι (titles) at the top of the pages. There is also another division according to the smaller Ammonian Sections, with references to the Eusebian Canons.

It contains the Eusebian Canon tables, tables of the κεφαλαια (tables of contents) before each of the Gospels, lectionary markings at the margin, and subscriptions at the end of each of the Gospels.

== Text ==
Kurt Aland did not place the Greek text of the codex in any Category.

== History ==
Currently the manuscript is dated by the INTF to the 14th century.

The manuscript was examined and described by Angelo Maria Bandini. It was added to the list of New Testament manuscripts by Gregory (837^{e}). Gregory saw it in 1886. It was later catalogued again as minuscule 2580 on the list Gregory-Aland. Number 2580 was cancelled.

Currently the manuscript is housed at the Laurentian Library (I. 94 suss., fol. 38–66), in Florence.

== See also ==
- List of New Testament minuscules
- Biblical manuscript
- Textual criticism
- Minuscule 836
