= Minuscule 832 =

- New Testament manuscript
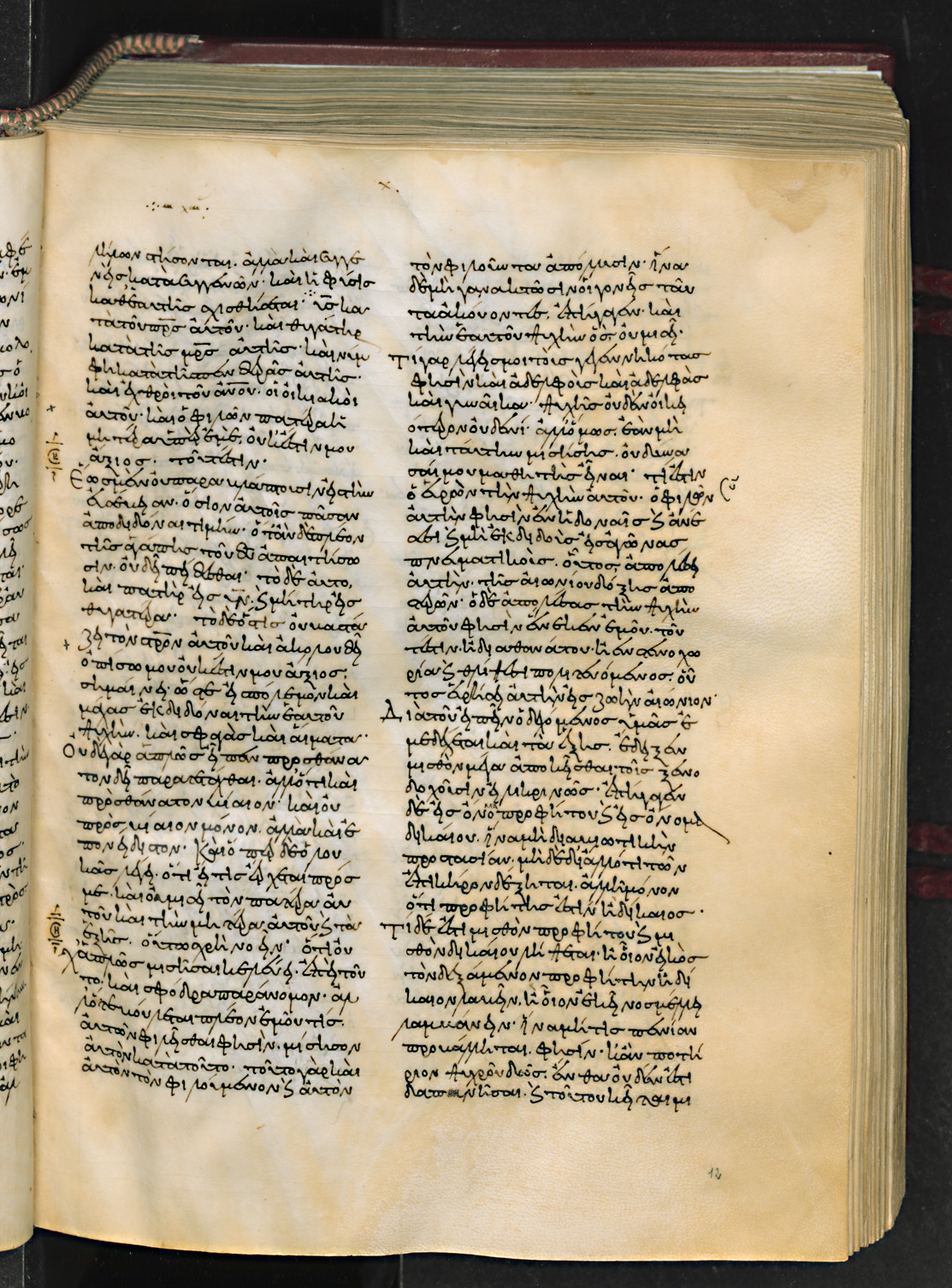
- Folio 12 recto
- Text: Gospels, Catholic epistles †
- Date: 10th century
- Script: Greek
- Now at: Laurentian Library
- Size: 33 cm by 25 cm
- Type: Byzantine text-type
- Category: none
- Note: commentary

Minuscule 832 (in the Gregory-Aland numbering), A^{127} (von Soden), is a 10th-century Greek minuscule manuscript of the New Testament on parchment. The manuscript has no complex contents.

== Description ==
The codex contains the text of the Gospel of Matthew, Gospel of John, and Catholic epistles, on 251 parchment leaves (size 33 cm by 25 cm). The text is written in two columns per page, 37 lines per page. It has some lacunae (in Luke and Jude 3-25).

It contains a commentary to the Catholic epistles.

== Text ==
Kurt Aland the Greek text of the codex did not place in any Category.

It was not examined by Claremont Profile Method.

== History ==
Gregory dated the manuscript to the 10th century. Currently the manuscript is dated by the INTF to the 10th century.

The manuscript was examined and described by Angelo Maria Bandini.

Formerly it was designated by 832^{e} and 143^{a}. It was added to the list of New Testament manuscripts by Gregory (832^{e}). Gregory saw it in 1886.

Currently the manuscript is housed at the Laurentian Library (Plutei VI. 5), in Florence.

== See also ==
- List of New Testament minuscules
- Biblical manuscript
- Textual criticism
- Minuscule 833
