= Biblioteca Marucelliana =

Coordinates: 43.7775°N 11.2575°E

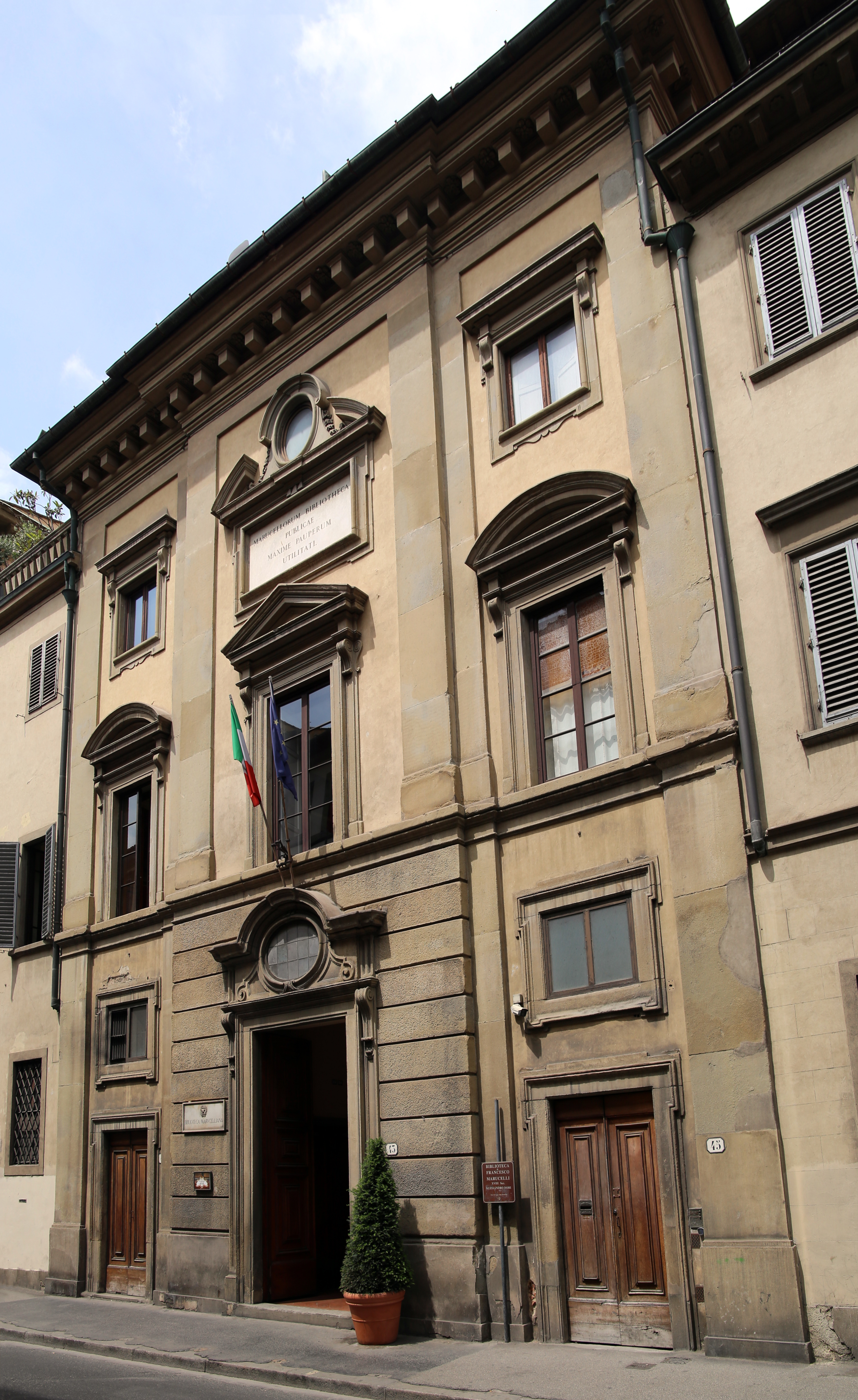
Biblioteca Marucelliana, facade of library

The Marucelliana Library or Biblioteca Marucelliana, is a public library, founded by the mid-18th century, and located on Via Camillo Cavour # 43, in Florence, region of Tuscany, Italy.

== History ==
The library was opened to the public on September 18, 1752. It was willed by Abbot Francesco Marucelli, (died in Rome, 1703), as a library of general knowledge open to a wide audience, as indicated by the inscription on the facade: "Marucellorum Bibliotheca publicae maxime pauperum utilitati". The core of the collection derives from the library of Abbot Francesco.

Funded by the income of various abbeys, Francesco lived in Rome, where he was sometimes consulted as an expert in the Canon Law. His only publication, was a bibliographic compendium in fifteen volumes, Mare Magnum, of the contents of his library and or those of his acquaintance.

The building was commissioned by the grandson of the founder, Alessandro Marucelli (died 1751). Also a bibliophile himself, Alessandro expanded the entries in Mare Magnum to 24 volumes, and fulfilled his grandfather's will by selecting the site for the library on Via Condotti. He also donated his own books and appointed Angelo Maria Bandini as first librarian, a post he held for the fifty years. Alessandro died before the construction was complete. The original collection numbered about 6000 manuscripts, in all disciplines.

Bandini established the first alphabetic catalogues of the works, by author and by title. Mare Magnum was expanded to 111 volumes. Bandini concurrently served as the librarian for the Biblioteca Laurenziana in Florence. In 1776, the suppression of the Jesuits, brought their large collections into the library, consisting of more than one hundred and fifty works, including a dozen manuscripts. In 1783, Bandini brought into the collection the drawings and prints of Francesco di Ruberto, and also those of the Marucelli family. He purchased the manuscript collection of Anton Francesco Gori, and obtained the library of the naturalist Antonio Cocchi and a portion of the library of the antiquarian Filippo Stosch.

The second librarian, Francesco Del Furia (1777-1856), held the post for the next fifty years. In the second half of the nineteenth century and the first of the next century by collections from the Martelli and Bonamici families and the correspondence of Nencioni, as well as many other documents and manuscripts. The 19th century suppressions of convents also enlarged their collections, including most of their sixteenth-century incunabula.

The late nineteenth-century English novelist George Gissing used the library on a number of occasions in early January 1889.

In 1910, a law demanded that nearly all printed public works from Florence and nearby provinces also be deposited in the Marucelliana.

== Art and architecture ==
The edifice was built to house the library. A public contest to create the design had two main submissions, one by the Roman architect Alessandro Dori, and by the Florentine architect Giovanni Filippo Ciocchi. Dori had chosen Via Cavour as a main entrance, while Ciocchi chose a side street. A committee, which had access to the compelling wooden model, ultimately chose the less costly Dori model.

Construction (1747–1751) was directed by Dori; and by the late eighteenth century, space appeared tight. Currently, the complex has expanded beyond the original premises, into the adjacent Palaces Della Stufa and Pegna, and the ground floor of the Palazzo Fenzi Dardinelli.

The wooden model of the Library is on display, 104 cm high, 55 wide and 135 long. The model is detailed complete with the interior plans, including the Reading Room, as well as that of the access staircase.

The main reading room has a bust of Francesco Marucelli (1749) by Pietro Bracci and a plaster portrait of Giacomo Leopardi (1885) by Adriano Cecioni. A portrait of Francesco Marucelli has been attributed to Davide Canoniche.

At the base of the grand staircase there is a marble statue of Minerva, donated to the library by Giovanni Filippo Marucelli, bailiff of Malta.

== Collections ==
The library presently contains over a million volumes, including 490 incunabula and 7,995 cinquecentine, 2,927 manuscripts, and 69,345 personal letters and papers of interest. It contains nearly 53,000 etchings, and 3,200 drawings from the 16th-19th centuries, and 9,000 librettos of melodrammas, and numerous series of journals and newspapers. Among its treasures are the papers of the anatomist Francesco Redi, the naturalist Giacinto Cestoni, and some of the letters of Antonio Vallisneri. The collection includes the "Luigi Beuf" Italian Cryptogamic Herbarium, with nearly 3000 independent samples of dried cryptogams.
