= Minuscule 833 =

- New Testament manuscript
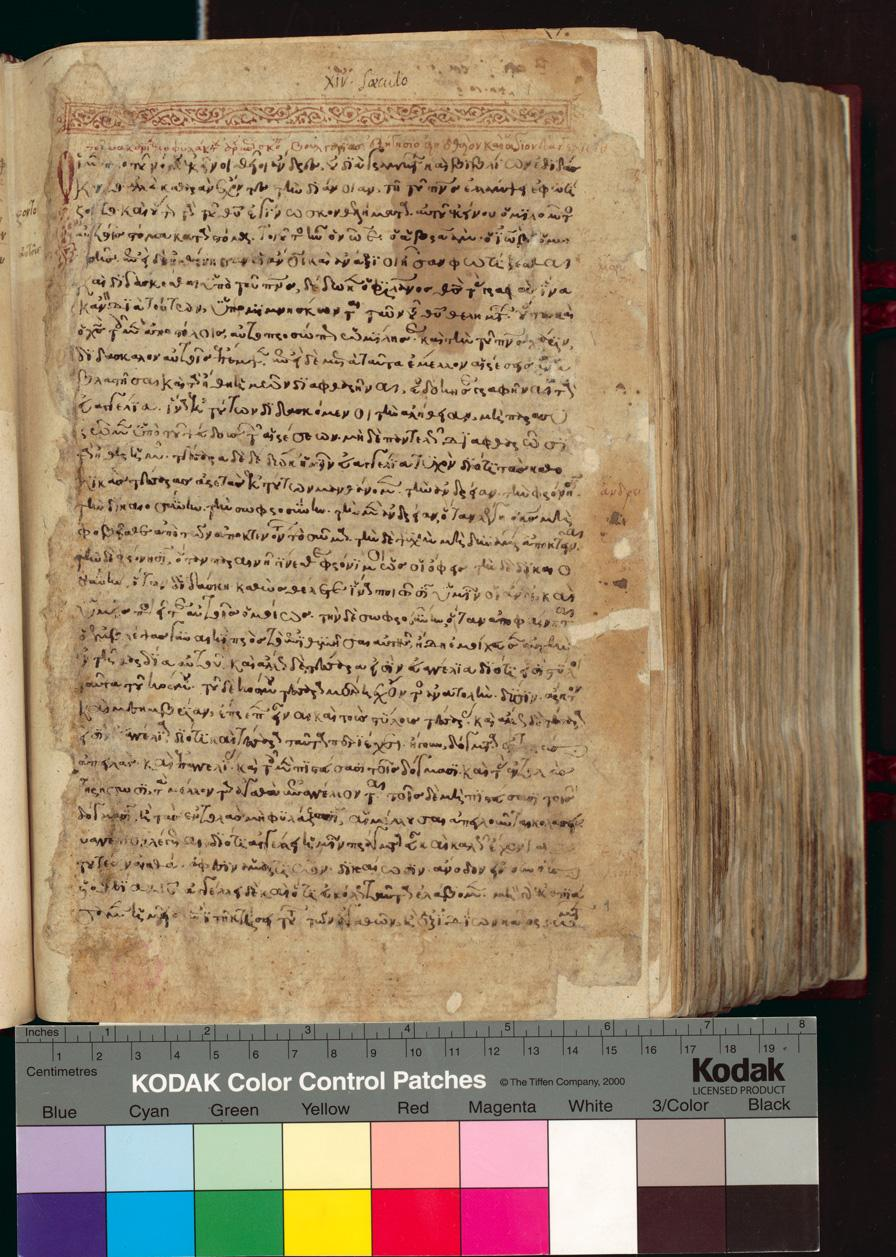
- Folio 1 recto
- Text: Gospels
- Date: 14th century
- Script: Greek
- Now at: Laurentian Library
- Size: 25.3 cm by 17 cm
- Type: Byzantine text-type
- Category: V
- Note: commentary

Minuscule 833 (in the Gregory-Aland numbering), Θ^{ε421} (von Soden), is a 14th-century Greek minuscule manuscript of the New Testament on paper. The manuscript has complex contents.

== Description ==
The codex contains the text of the four Gospels, on 359 paper leaves (size 25.3 cm by 17 cm). The text is written in one column per page, 41 lines per page.

It contains Prolegomena to each Gospel. It contains a commentary of Theophylact.

== Text ==
The Greek text of the codex is a representative of the Byzantine text-type. Kurt Aland placed it in Category V.

It was not examined by the Claremont Profile Method.

== History ==
Gregory dated the manuscript to the 14th century. Currently the manuscript is dated by the INTF to the 14th century.

The manuscript was examined by Angelo Maria Bandini. It was added to the list of New Testament manuscripts by Gregory (833^{e}). Gregory saw it in 1886.

Currently the manuscript is housed at the Laurentian Library (Plutei VI. 26), in Florence.

== See also ==
- List of New Testament minuscules
- Minuscule 832
- Minuscule 834
- Biblical manuscript
- Textual criticism
