= Minuscule 197 =

- New Testament manuscript
- Text: Matthew, Mark, James
- Date: 11th century
- Script: Greek
- Now at: Laurentian Library
- Size: 30.1 cm by 23.8 cm
- Type: Byzantine text-type
- Category: V
- Note: marginalia

Minuscule 197 (in the Gregory-Aland numbering), A^{132} (Soden), is a Greek minuscule manuscript of the New Testament, on parchment. Palaeographically it has been assigned to the 11th century. The manuscript is lacunose. It has marginalia.

== Description ==
The codex contains the text of the Gospel of Matthew 24:3-28:20, Gospel of Mark and Epistle of James 2:10-4:15, with a commentary, on 154 parchment leaves (size 30.1 cm by 23.8 cm). The text is written in one column per page, in 23 lines per page, in brown ink, the capital letters in red.

The text is divided according to the κεφαλαια (chapters), whose numbers are given at the margin, and the τιτλοι (titles) at the top of the pages. There is also a division according to the Ammonian Sections, with references to the Eusebian Canons (written below Ammonian Section numbers).

It contains prolegomena, tables of the κεφαλαια (tables of contents) before each Gospel, a commentary to Matthew is of Chrysostom's authorship, commentary to Mark is of Victor's authorship.

== Text ==
The Greek text of the codex is a representative of the Byzantine text-type. Aland placed it in Category V.

== History ==
The manuscript was examined by Bandini, Birch, Scholz, and Burgon. C. R. Gregory saw it in 1886.

It is currently housed at the Laurentian Library (Plutei. VIII. 14), at Florence.

== See also ==
- List of New Testament minuscules
- Biblical manuscript
- Textual criticism
