= Lectionary 118 =

Lectionary ℓ 118
- New Testament manuscript
- Text: Evangelistarion
- Date: 14th century
- Script: Greek
- Now at: Biblioteca Laurentiana
- Size: 38.3 cm by 28.5 cm

Lectionary 118, designated by siglum ℓ 118 (in the Gregory-Aland numbering) is a Greek manuscript of the New Testament, on parchment leaves. Palaeographically it has been assigned to the 14th century.

== Description ==
The codex contains lessons from the Gospels of John, Matthew, Luke lectionary (Evangelistarium), on 368 parchment leaves (38.3 cm by 28.5 cm). It is written in Greek minuscule letters, in 2 columns per page, 20 lines per page. It contains musical notes. It is elegantly written. It contains the Pericope Adulterae (John 7:53-8:11).

== History ==
The manuscript was held in St. Silvester in Constantinople (or Rome). It was brought to Florence in 1454. The manuscript was added to the list of New Testament manuscripts by Scholz. Bandini was the first who described this codex (in 1787).

The manuscript is not cited in the critical editions of the Greek New Testament (UBS3).

Currently the codex is located in the Biblioteca Laurentiana (Med. Pal. 243) in Florence.

== See also ==
- List of New Testament lectionaries
- Biblical manuscript
- Textual criticism
- ℓ 117

== Bibliography ==
- Angelo Bandini, Illustratione de due evangeliari greci del secolo XI, Venedig 1787.
