= Minuscule 190 =

- New Testament manuscript
- Text: Gospels
- Date: 14th century
- Script: Greek
- Now at: Laurentian Library
- Size: 14.3 cm by 11.3 cm
- Type: Byzantine text-type
- Category: V
- Note: marginalia

Minuscule 190 (in the Gregory-Aland numbering), ε 411 (Soden), is a Greek minuscule manuscript of the New Testament, on parchment. Palaeographically it has been assigned to the 14th century. It has marginalia.

== Description ==
The codex contains a complete text of the four Gospels on 439 elegant parchment leaves (size 14.3 cm by 11.3 cm). The text is written in one column per page, in 17 lines per page.

The text is divided according to the κεφαλαια (chapters), whose numbers are given at the margin, and the τιτλοι (titles of chapters) at the top of the pages. There is also a division according to the smaller Ammonian Sections (in Mark 234 Sections – the last section in 16:9), but without references to the Eusebian Canons.

It contains Prolegomena, tables of the κεφαλαια (tables of contents) before each Gospel, lectionary markings at the margin (for liturgical reading) and pictures. The text of Mark 16:8-20 is omitted.

== Text ==
The Greek text of the codex is a representative of the Byzantine text-type. Hermann von Soden included it to the textual family K^{x}. Aland placed it in Category V. According to the Claremont Profile Method it creates textual cluster 190 in Luke 1, Luke 10, and Luke 20.

== History ==
The manuscript is dated by a colophon to the year 1285, but this was added by a later hand.

It was examined by Bandini, Birch, Scholz, and Burgon. C. R. Gregory saw it in 1886.

It is currently housed at the Laurentian Library (Plutei. VI. 28), at Florence.

== See also ==
- List of New Testament minuscules
- Biblical manuscript
- Textual criticism
