= Lectionary 112 =

Lectionary ℓ 112
- New Testament manuscript
- Text: Evangelistarion, Apostolos
- Date: 11th-century
- Script: Greek
- Now at: Biblioteca Laurentiana
- Size: 18.6 cm by 13.8 cm

Lectionary 112, designated by siglum ℓ 112 (in the Gregory-Aland numbering) is a Greek manuscript of the New Testament, on parchment leaves. Palaeographically it has been assigned to the 11th-century.

== Description ==
The codex contains lessons from the Gospels (Evangelistarium) and Acts of the Apostles (Apostolos) with lacunae at the beginning. It is written in Greek minuscule letters, on 148 parchment leaves (18.6 cm by 13.8 cm), in 1 column per page, 22 lines per page.

== History ==
The manuscript is dated by the INTF to the 11th-century.

The manuscript was added to the list of New Testament manuscripts by Scholz. It was examined by Scholz and Burgon.

The manuscript is not cited in the critical editions of the Greek New Testament (UBS3).

Currently the codex is located in the Biblioteca Laurentiana (Conventi Soppresi 24) in Florence.

== See also ==
- List of New Testament lectionaries
- Biblical manuscript
- Textual criticism

== Bibliography ==
- Gregory, Caspar René (1900). Textkritik des Neuen Testaments. Vol. 1. Leipzig: J. C. Hinrichs. pp. 397, 465.
