= Papyrus 36 =

Papyrus 𝔓^{36}
- New Testament manuscript
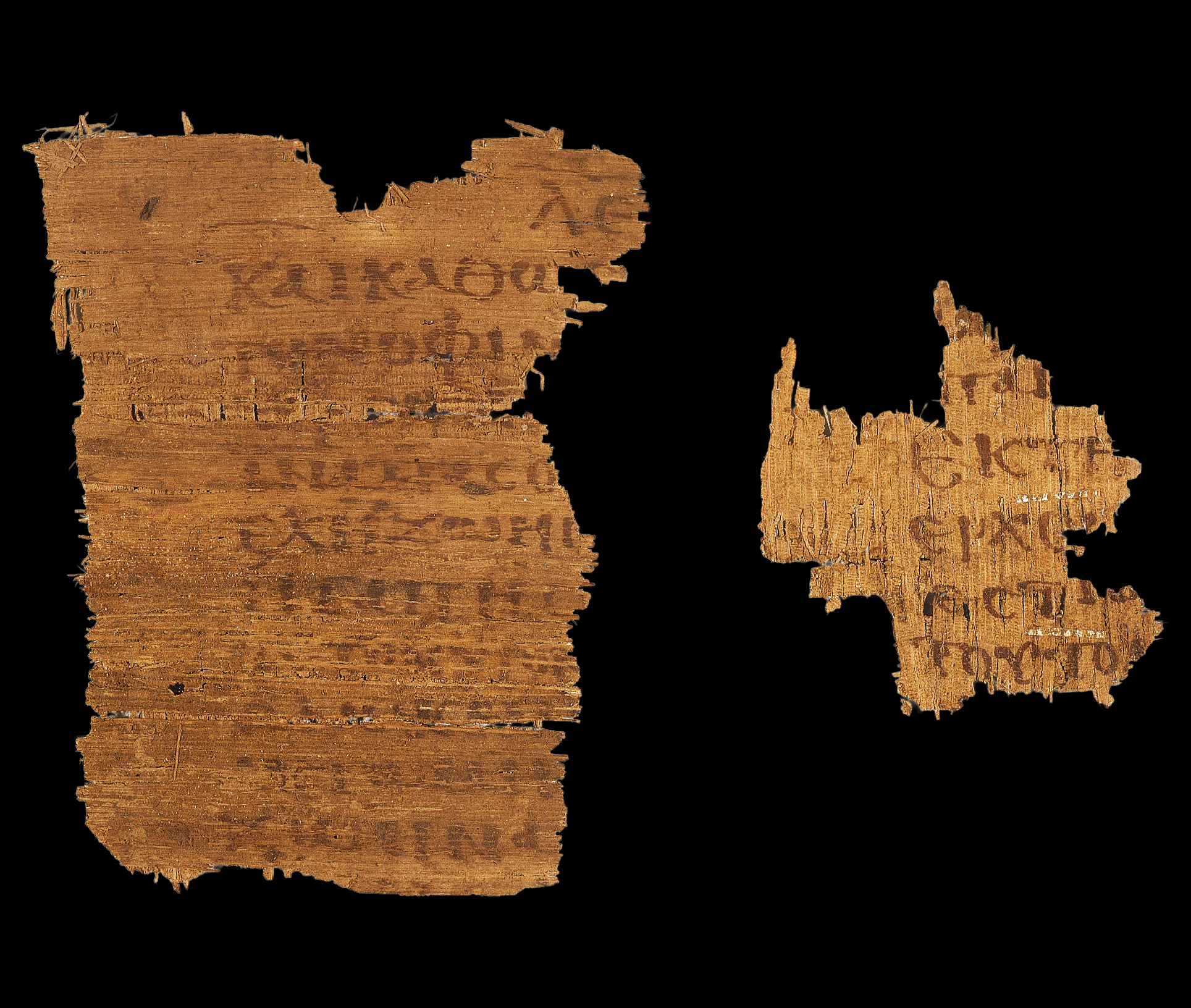
- Recto John 3:17-18, 31-32
- Text: John 3 †
- Date: 6th century
- Script: Greek
- Found: Egypt
- Now at: Laurentian Library
- Cite: E. Pistelli, PGLSI I (1912), pp. 5-6
- Type: eclectic
- Category: III

Papyrus 36 (in the Gregory-Aland numbering), designated by siglum 𝔓^{36}, is a copy of the New Testament in Greek. It is a papyrus manuscript of the Gospel of John, it contains only John 3:14-18.31-32.34-35. The manuscript palaeographically has been assigned to the 6th century.

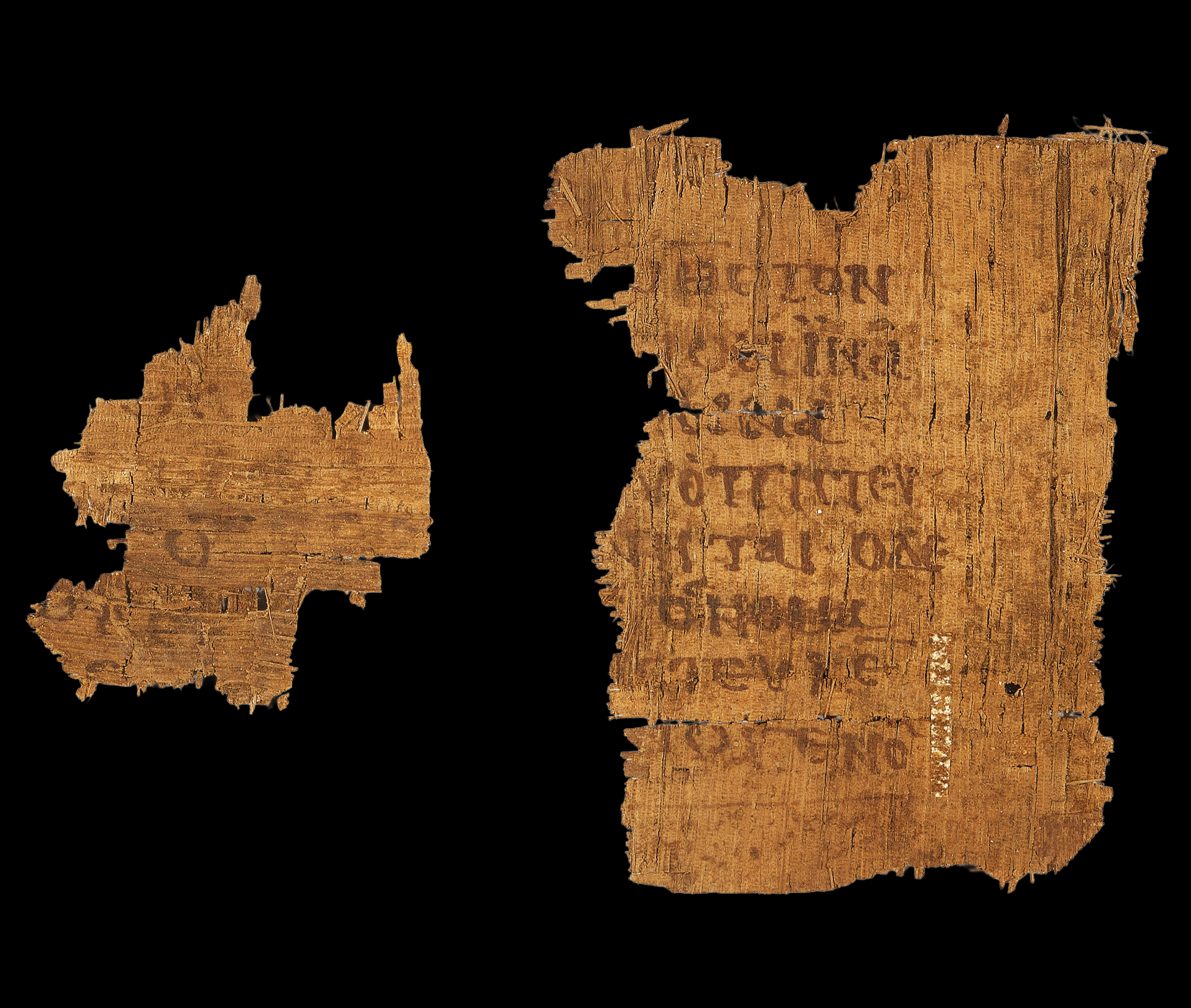
Verso John 3:17-18, 31-32

The Greek text of this codex is an eclectic. Aland placed it in Category III.

The manuscript was examined by Pistelli, Carlini, and Horseley.

It is currently housed at the Laurentian Library (PSI 3) in Florence.

== See also ==
- List of New Testament papyri
- Papyrus 35
