= Minuscule 444 =

- New Testament manuscript
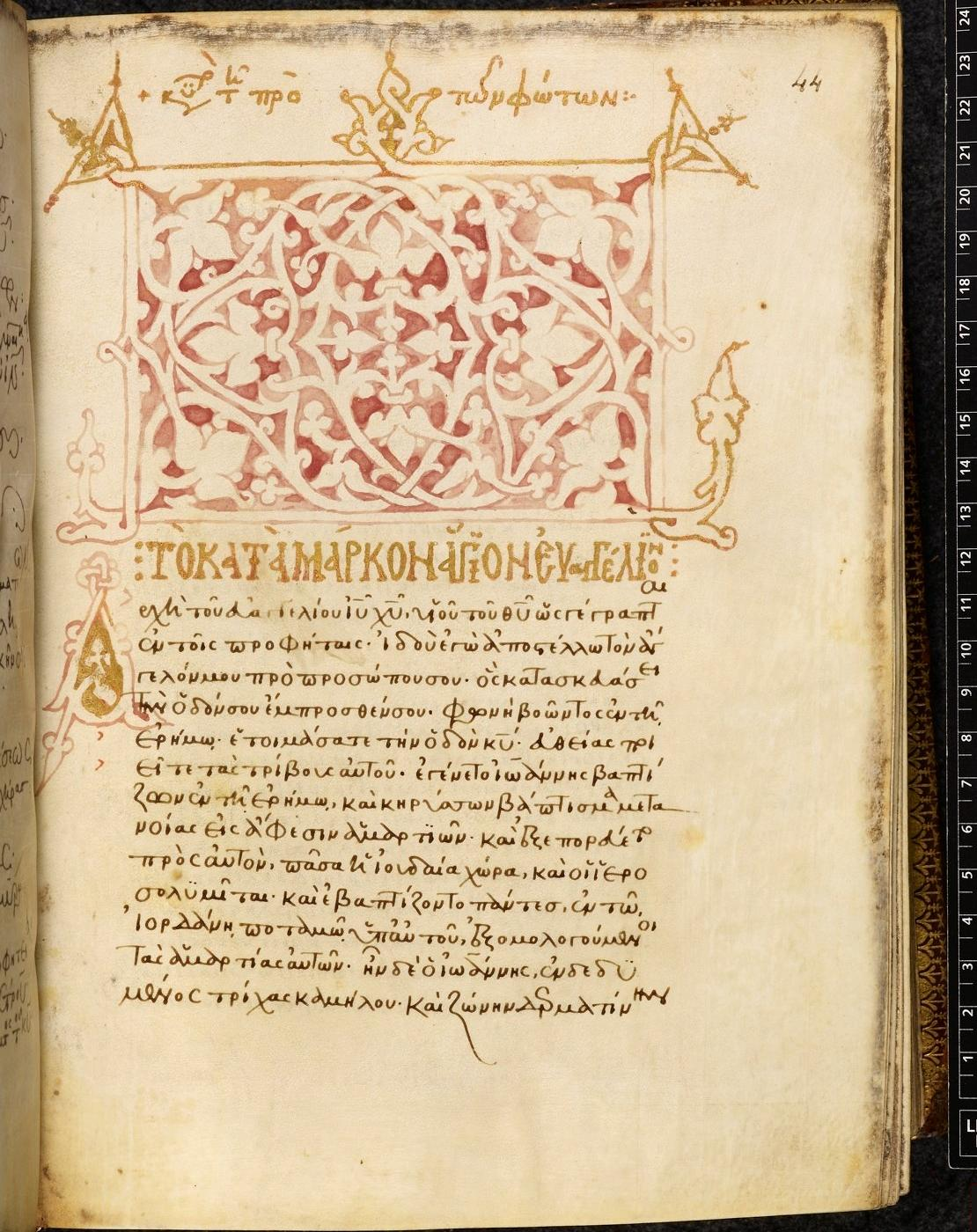
- The first page of Mark
- Text: New Testament (except Rev.)
- Date: 15th century
- Script: Greek
- Now at: British Library
- Size: 26 cm by 19.5 cm
- Type: Byzantine
- Category: none

Minuscule 444 (in the Gregory-Aland numbering), δ 551 (in the Soden numbering), is a Greek minuscule manuscript of the New Testament, on parchment. Palaeographically it has been assigned to the 15th century.

== Description ==
The codex contains the text of the New Testament except Book of Revelation on 324 parchment leaves (26 cm by 19.5 cm). The order of books: Gospels (ff. 1-154), Acts, Catholic epistles, and Pauline epistles.

The text is written in one column per page, in 25-30 lines per page.

The lists of the κεφαλαια (tables of contents) are placed before each book. It contains the τιτλοι (titles) at the top, lectionary equipment at the margin, subscriptions at the end of books, στιχοι, Synaxarion, Menologion, and scholia.

== Text ==
Kurt Aland the Greek text of the codex did not place in any Category. Hermann von Soden classified it to the textual family K^{r}. According to the Claremont Profile Method it belongs to the textual cluster M1326 in Luke 1 and Luke 20. In Luke 10 no profile was made. To the cluster M1326 belong manuscripts: minuscule 191, 1326, 1396, 2521. The cluster is related to the cluster M106.

== History ==
The manuscript was dated by Scrivener and Gregory to the 15th century. Currently it is dated by the INTF to the 15th century.

The manuscript came from the Athos (probably). It was bought in 1537 by one Greek man for 500 asper. Bernard Mould bought it in 1722 in Smyrna. It was sold to Edward Harley on 28 July 1725. After his death it was bought for British Museum in 1753.

The manuscript was added to the list of New Testament manuscripts by Scholz (1794-1852). Scholz examined Matthew 5. C. R. Gregory saw the manuscript in 1883.

It is currently housed at the British Library (Harley 5796) in London.

== See also ==
- List of New Testament minuscules
- Biblical manuscript
- Textual criticism
