= Ermenegildo Pistelli =

Italian papyrologist, paleographer and philologist

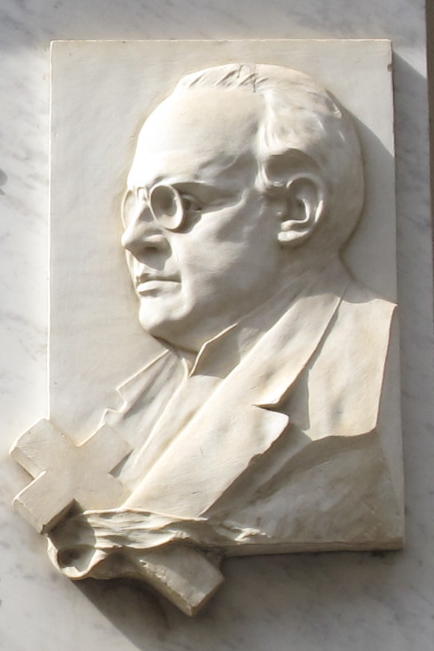
- Bust of Pistelli in Camaiore, Italy
- Born: February 18, 1862; Camaiore
- Died: January 14, 1927 (aged 64); Florence

Ermenegildo Pistelli (February 18, 1862 – January 14, 1927) was an Italian papyrologist, palaeographer, philologist and presbyter.

== Biography ==
Born in Camaiore in 1862, Pistelli was a pupil of Girolamo Vitelli and finished his philological studies in Florence. He became a Piarist in 1884. Since 1903 he taught Latin and Ancient Greek at the Istituto di Studii Superiori Pratici e di Perfezionamento (the modern University of Florence) and in 1921 became corresponding member of the Accademia dei Lincei.

He oversaw the publication of various works ranging from Giovanni Pascoli's poems to works about Dante Alighieri to ancient papyrus texts; as a papyrologist, he examined numerous manuscripts found at Oxyrhynchus, e.g. Papyrus 2, 35, 36, Uncial 0171, 0173. Pistelli also was a prolific writer of reviews, critical essays and prose works on various subjects, as well as works for young readers.

He died in Florence in 1927.

== Significant works ==
- 1901. De recentiorum studiis in Tyrtaeum collatis. B.Seeber: Firenze.
- 1917. Le pìstole d'Omero.
- 1921. Profili e caratteri.
- 1921. Per la Firenze di Dante.
- 1927. Eroi, uomini e ragazzi.
- Editions: Iamblichus, Protrepticus (Teubner, 1888)
