= Francesco Marucelli =

Italian bibliographer

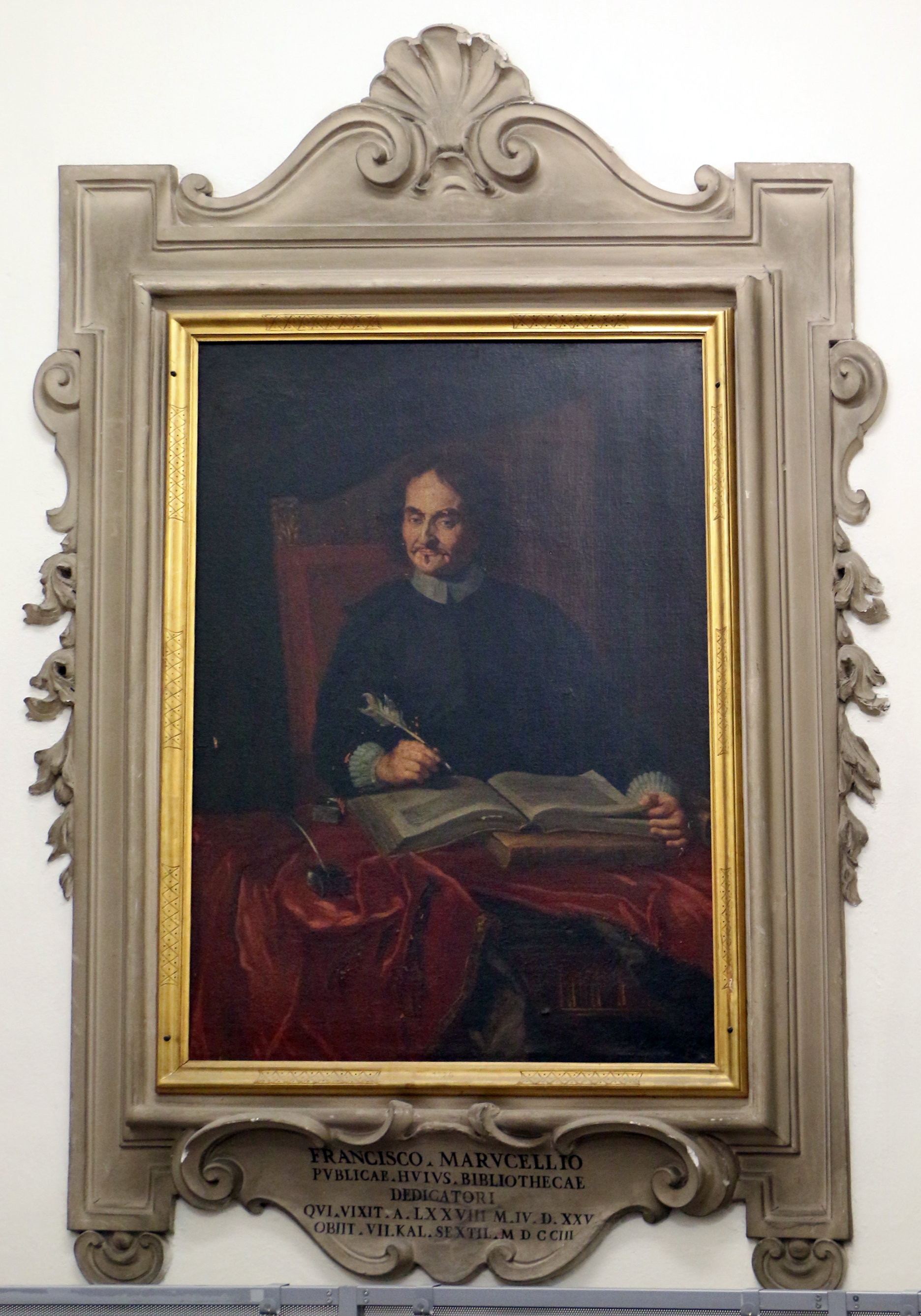
- Portrait of Francesco Marucelli, Biblioteca Marucelliana
- Born: 1 March 1625; Florence, Grand Duchy of Tuscany
- Died: 29 July 1703 (aged 78); Rome, Papal States
- Occupation: Bibliographer, bibliophile, scholar
- Works: Mare Magnum

Francesco Marucelli (1 March 1625 – 29 July 1703) was an Italian abbot, bibliographer and bibliophile. His book collections form the core of the Biblioteca Marucelliana in Florence.

== Biography ==
Born in Florence into a wealthy and noble family, Marucelli enrolled in 1643 to study civil and canon law at the University of Pisa, where he befriended Gaudenzio Pazanino. By 1648, he had gained his doctorate. He then moved to Rome, prompted by his uncle Giuliano Marucelli, then under the patronage of cardinal Girolamo Farnese, Francesco entered the papal courts in Rome. Upon the death of his uncle in 1656, he was appointed as absentee abbot for two monasteries in the Kingdom of Naples: San Lorenzo di Cropani and Santa Maria di Cavugliano di Tarsia. In Rome, he was a prolific patron of artists, including the Dutch Dirck Helmbreker.

But he mostly dedicated himself to collecting books, and in his bequest he donated this extensive collection and money to the foundation of a library in Florence, the Biblioteca Marucelliana, which was the first institution of this kind in the city which was open to the public.

Marucelli was the author of Mare Magnum, a monumental bibliographic catalogue, which over the years grew to 111 volumes and over 6,000 entries which intended to catalogue the publications of that time, divided by subject fields. This work was ordered and published by his grandson Alessandro and is preserved in manuscript form at the Biblioteca Marucelliana.
