= Papyrus 35 =

Papyrus 𝔓^{35}
- New Testament manuscript
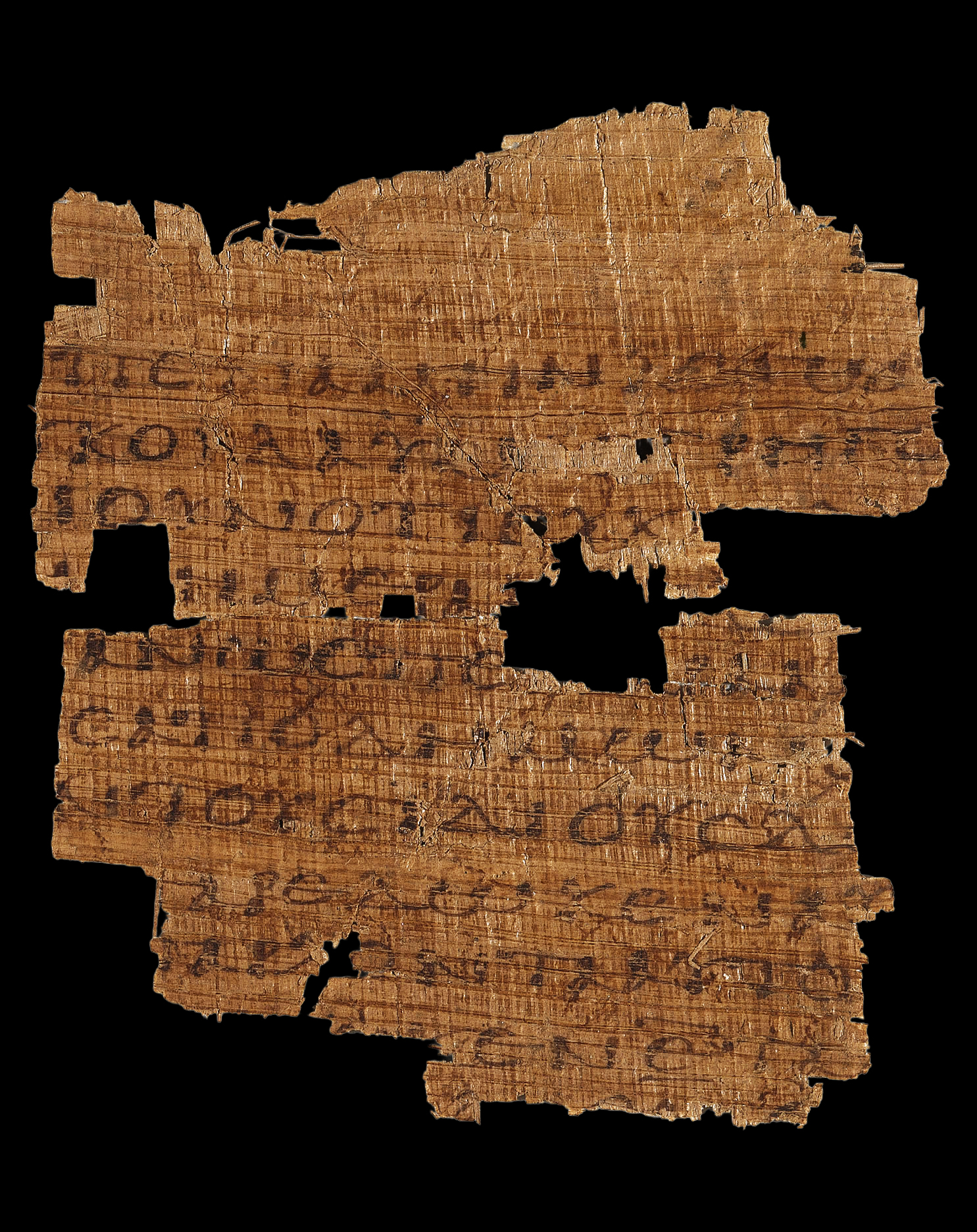
- Recto Matthew 25:12-15
- Text: Matthew 25 †
- Date: 4th century
- Script: Greek
- Found: Egypt
- Now at: Laurentian Library
- Cite: E. Pistelli, PGLSI I (1912), pp. 1-2
- Size: 26 cm by 15 cm
- Type: Alexandrian text-type
- Category: I

Papyrus 35 (in the Gregory-Aland numbering), designated by 𝔓^{35}, is an early copy of the New Testament in Greek. It is a papyrus manuscript of the Gospel of Matthew, it contains only Matthew 25:12-15.20-23. The manuscript paleographically has been assigned to the 3rd or 4th century.

== Description ==
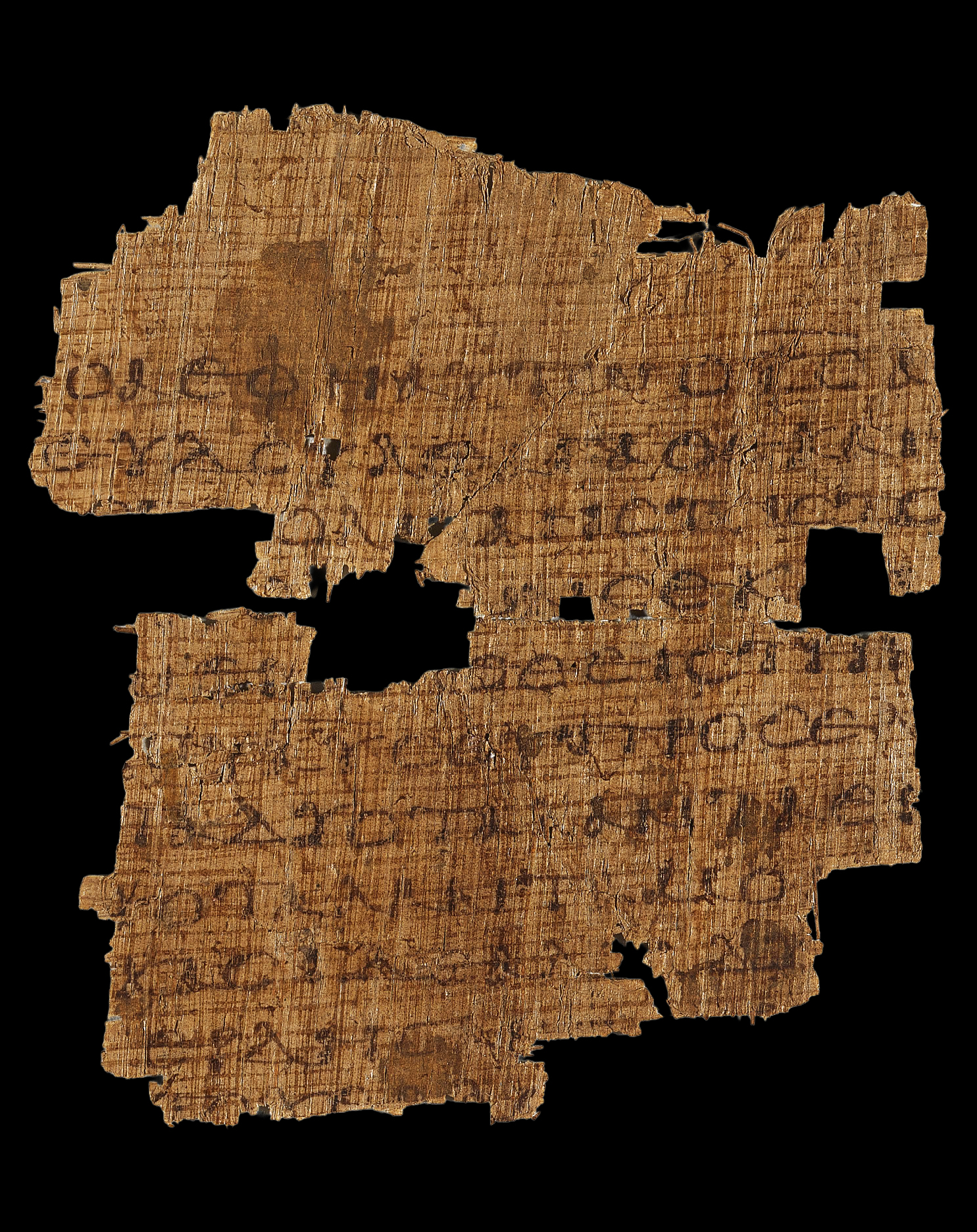
Verso Matthew 25:20-23

The Greek text of this codex is a representative of the Alexandrian text-type. Aland placed it in Category I.

Aland dated the manuscript to the 4th century, Roberts and T. C. Skeat dated it to the 3rd century.

It is currently housed at the Laurentian Library (PSI 1) in Florence.

== See also ==
- List of New Testament papyri
- Biblical manuscript
- Papyrus 36

== Images ==
- Images of GA_P35 Florence, Biblioteca Medicea Laurenziana; Shelf Number: P.S.I. 1 at CSNTM
