= Angelo Maria Bandini =

Italian writer (1726–1803)

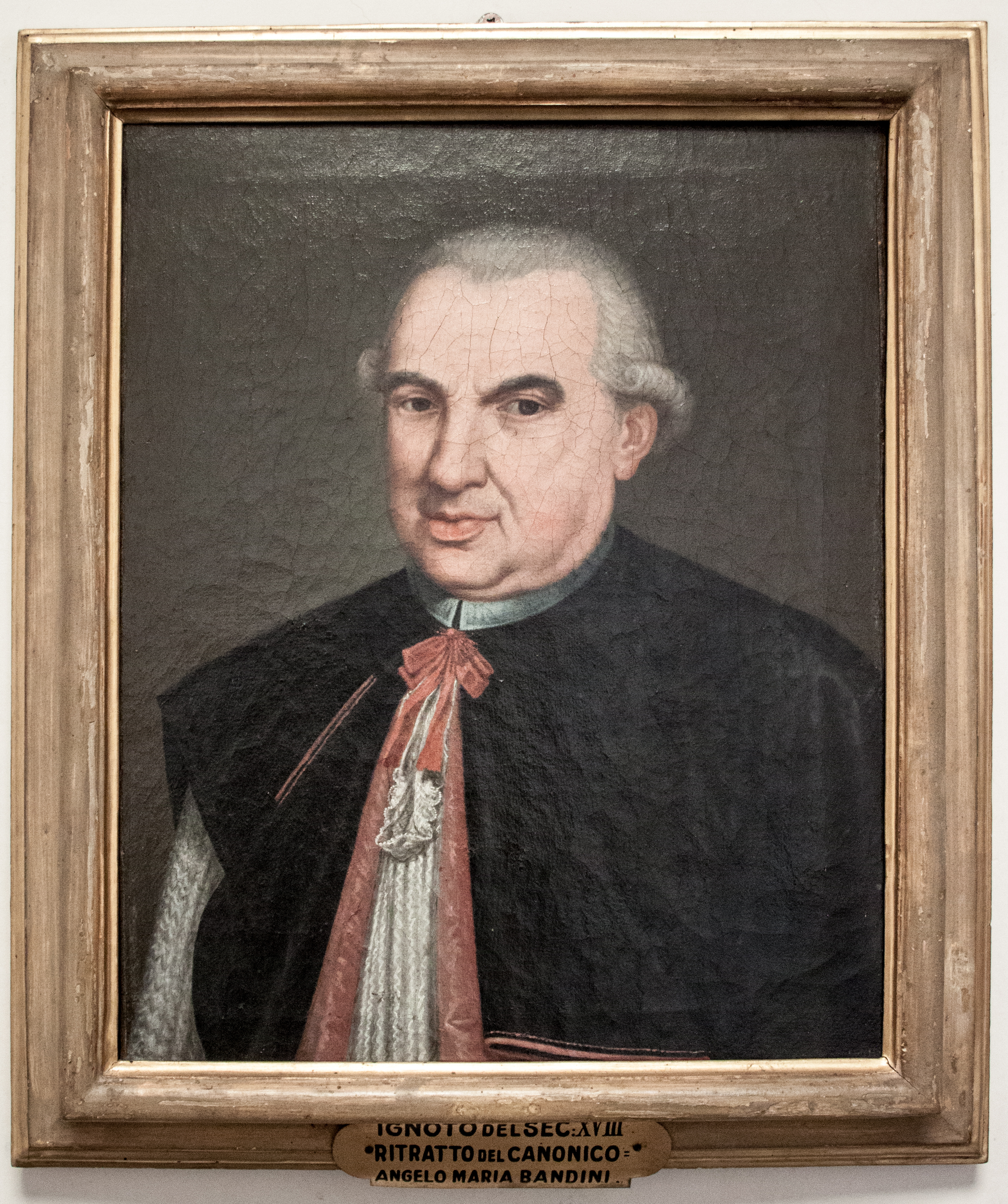
- Born: 25 September 1726 Florence
- Died: 1803 (aged 76–77) Fiesole
- Relatives: Giuseppe Bandini (uncle)

Angelo Maria Bandini (25 September 1726 – 1803) was an Italian author and librarian born in Florence.

== Biography ==
Orphan since infancy, Angelo Maria was supported by his uncle, Giuseppe Bandini, a lawyer of some note. He was initially educated among the Jesuits, and showed a special inclination for the study of antiquities. In 1747 he undertook a journey to Vienna with the bishop of Volterra, for whom he acted in the capacity of secretary. He was introduced to the emperor and took the opportunity of dedicating to that monarch his Specimen Litteraturae Florentinae, which was then printed at Florence. On his return he took holy orders, and settled in Rome, passing the whole of his time in the library of the Vatican, and in those of the cardinals Passionei and Corsini.

The famous obelisk of Augustus, at that time removed from the ruins of Campus Martius, was described by Bandini in a learned folio volume entitled De Obelisco Augusti. Shortly after, he was compelled to leave Rome on account of his health and returned to Florence, where he was appointed librarian to the valuable Biblioteca Marucelliana bequeathed to the public by abbott Marucelli. In 1756 he was assigned by the emperor to a prebend at Florence, and appointed principal librarian to the Laurentian Library, vacant with the death of Antonio Maria Biscioni. Over forty-four years he continued to discharge the duties of this appointment, and died in 1803, generally esteemed and missed. On his deathbed he founded a public school and bequeathed the remainder of his fortune to other charitable purposes.

Bandini described some biblical manuscripts: 181, 186, 187, 190, 191, 197, 198, 363, 832, 833, 834, 835, ℓ 117, and ℓ 118.

== Works ==
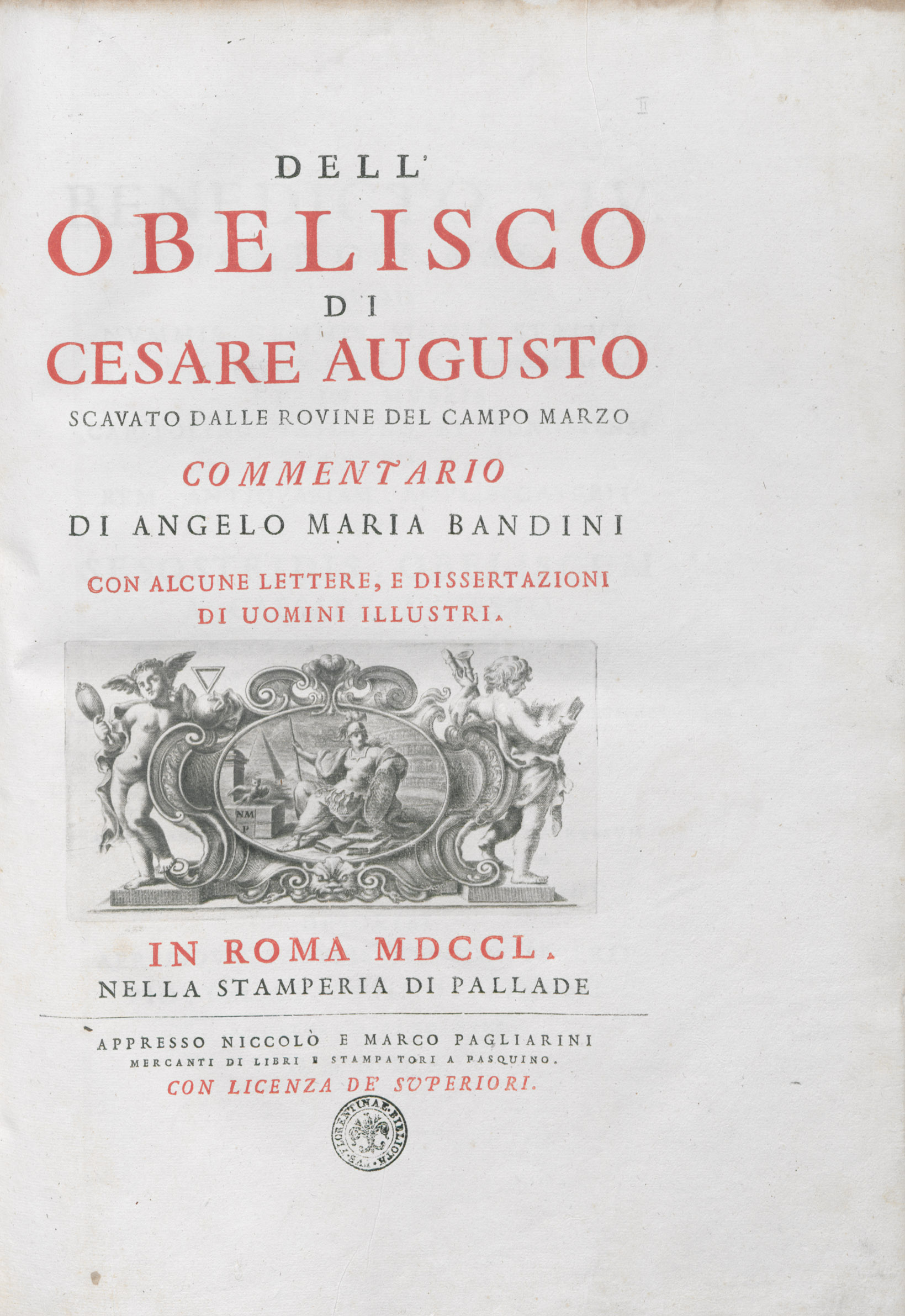
Dell'obelisco di Cesare Augusto (De obelisco Caesaris Augusti e campi Martii ruderibus nuper eruto), 1750

The most important of his numerous works are the Catalogus Codd. MSS. Graec., Lat., Ital., Bib., Laurent., 8 vols (1767–1778), and the Vita e Lettere d'Amerigo Vespucci, 1745.

- Catalogus codicum manuscriptorum graecorum, latinorum, italicorum etc, Bibliothecae Mediceae Laurentianae (1767–1778)
- Catalogus codicum bibliothecae Laurentianae 3. (Florentiae 1770)
- Catalogus codicum manuscriptorum latinorum Bibliothecae Mediceae Laurentianae (1774)
- Dissertazione sopra un antica tavoletta di avorio a il signor Cardinal Angelo Maria Querini (1747)
- Vita di Filippo Strozzi (1756), regarding Filippo Strozzi the Younger
- Memorie per servire alla vita del senatore Pier Vettori (1756), regarding Pier Vettori
