= Laurentian Library =

Library in Florence, Italy

Coordinates: 43.774521°N 11.253374°E

Laurentian Library (Biblioteca Medicea Laurenziana)
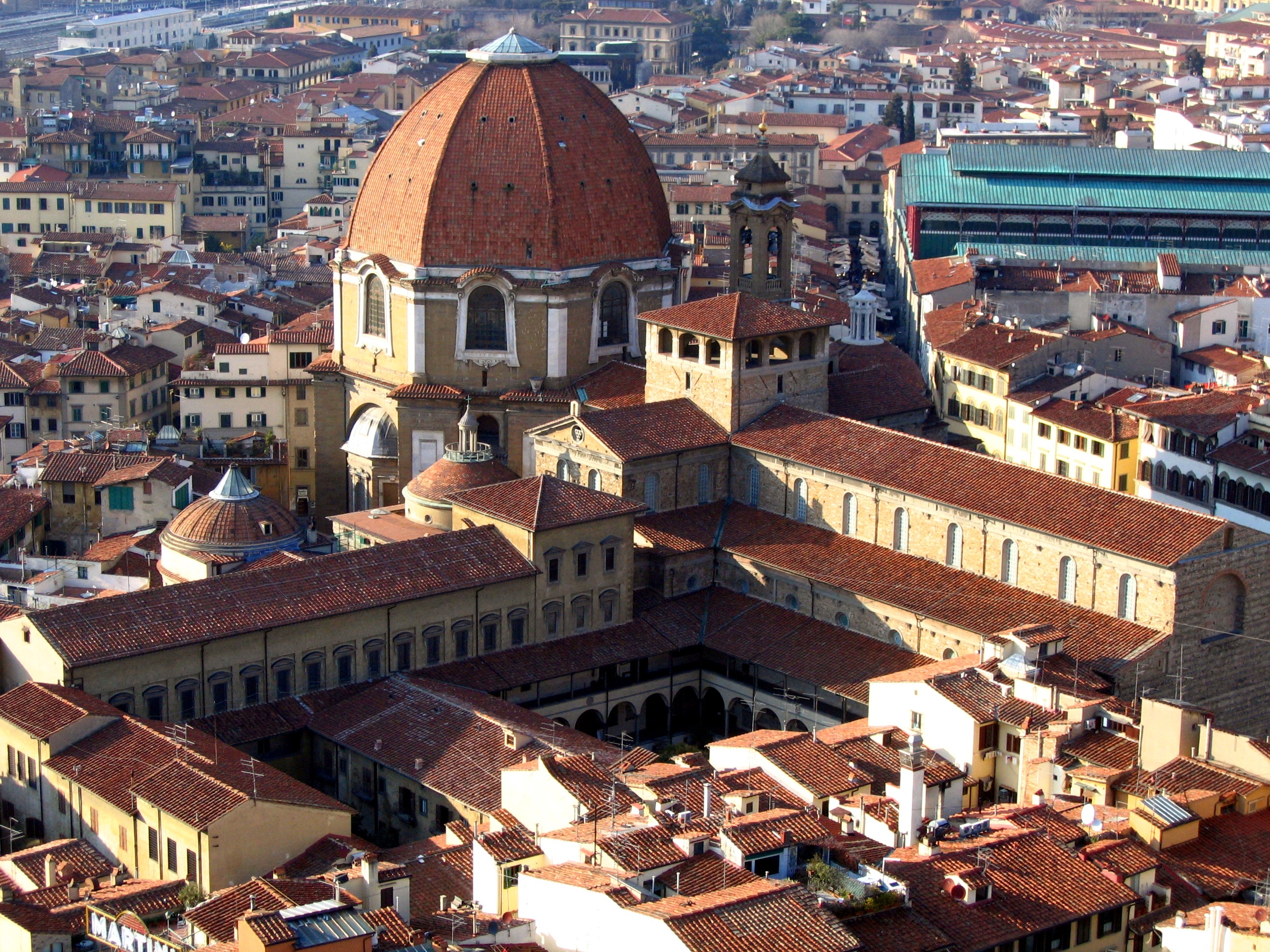
- The Laurentian Library can be identified in the long row of windows above the cloister extending to the left of the photograph; the taller structure with two rows of windows immediately to its right is the vestibule.
- Established: 1571

Collection
- Size: 254,905 item (2022)

Other information
- Website: https://www.bmlonline.it

The Laurentian Library (Biblioteca Medicea Laurenziana or BML) is a historic library in Florence, Italy, containing more than 11,000 manuscripts and 4,500 early printed books. Built in a cloister of the Medicean Basilica di San Lorenzo di Firenze under the patronage of the Medici pope Clement VII, the library was built to emphasize that the Medici were no longer just merchants but members of intelligent and ecclesiastical society. It contains the manuscripts and books belonging to the private library of the Medici family. The library building is renowned for its architecture that was designed by Michelangelo and is an example of Mannerism.

All of the book-bound manuscripts in the library are identified in its Codex Laurentianus. The library conserves the Littera Florentina, the Vergilius Mediceus, the Nahuatl Florentine Codex, the Rabula Gospels, the Codex Amiatinus, the Squarcialupi Codex, and the fragmentary Erinna papyrus that contains part of her Distaff.

== Architecture ==
The Laurentian Library was commissioned in 1523 and construction began in 1525; however, when Michelangelo left Florence in 1534, only the walls of the reading room were complete. It was then continued by Tribolo, Vasari, and Ammannati based on plans and verbal instructions from Michelangelo. The library opened by 1571. In this way, the library integrates parts executed by Michelangelo with others built much later in an interpretation of his instructions. The Laurentian Library is one of Michelangelo's most important architectural achievements. Even Michelangelo's contemporaries realized that the innovations and use of space in the Laurentian Library were revolutionary.

The admirable distribution of the windows, the construction of the ceiling, and the fine entrance of the Vestibule can never be sufficiently extolled. Boldness and grace are equally conspicuous in the work as a whole, and in every part; in the cornices, corbels, the niches for statues, the commodious staircase, and its fanciful division, in all the building, as a word, which is so unlike the common fashion of treatment, that every one stands amazed at the sight thereof. – Giorgio Vasari.

The two-story quattrocento cloister remained unchanged by the addition of the library. Because of this, certain features of Michelangelo's plan, such as length and width, were already determined. Therefore, new walls were built on pre-existing walls and cloisters. Because the walls were built on pre-existing walls, recessing the columns into the walls was a structural necessity. This led to a unique style and pattern that Michelangelo took advantage of.

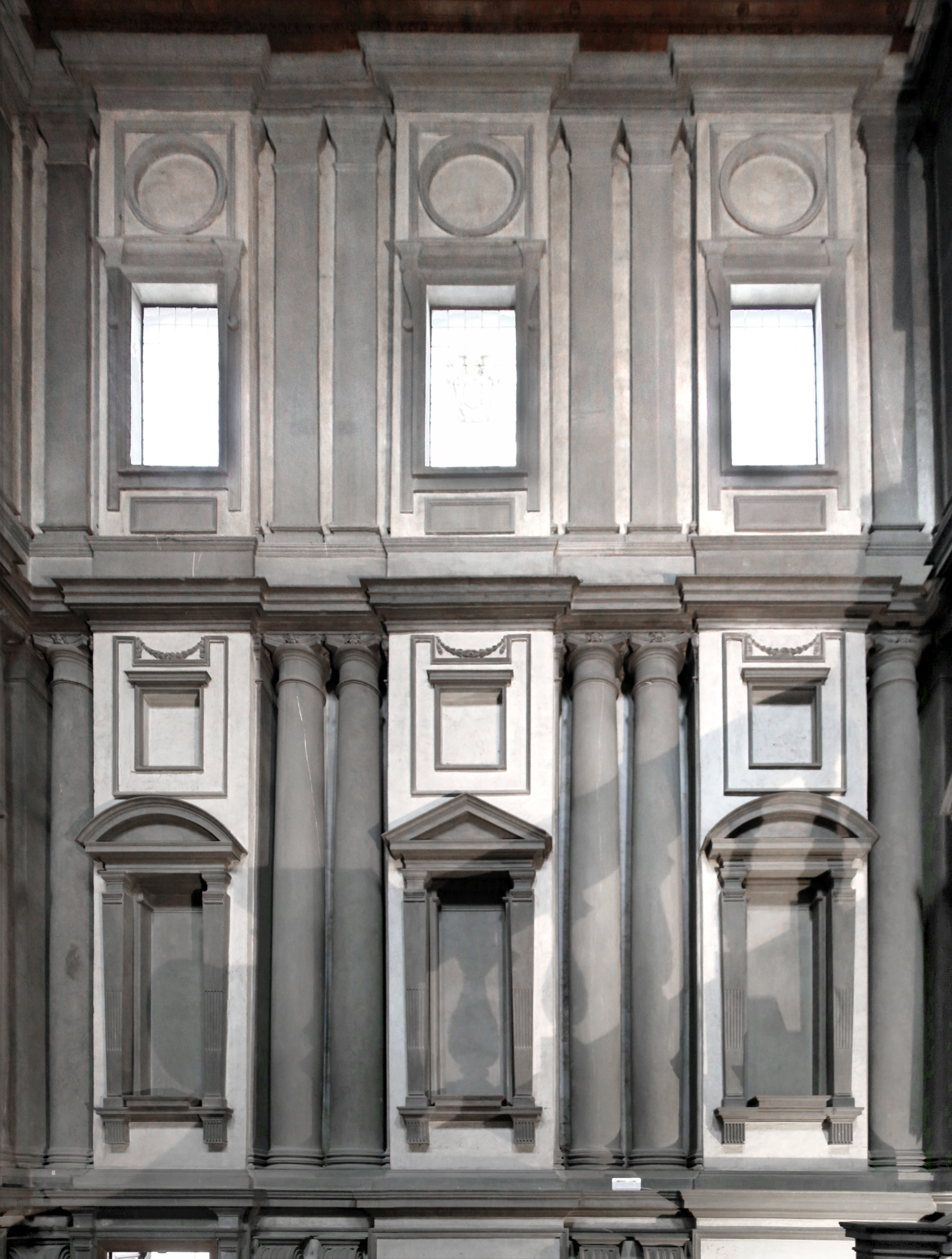
The vestibule

=== Vestibule ===
The vestibule, also known as the ricetto, is 10.50 m long, 10.50 m wide, and 14.6 m tall (34.5 by 34.5 by 48 feet). It was built above existing monastic quarters on the east range of the cloister, with an entrance from the upper level of the cloisters. Originally, Michelangelo planned for a skylight, but Clement VII believed that it would cause the roof to leak, so clerestory windows were incorporated into the west wall. Blank tapering windows—framed in pietra serena, surmounted by either triangular or segmental pediments, and separated by paired columns set into the wall—circumscribe the interior of the vestibule.

Lit by windows in bays that are articulated by pilasters corresponding to the beams of the ceiling, with a tall constricted vestibule (executed to Michelangelo's design in 1559 by Bartolomeo Ammannati) that is filled with a stair that flows up to (and down from) the entrance to the reading room, the library is often mentioned as a prototype of Mannerism in architecture.

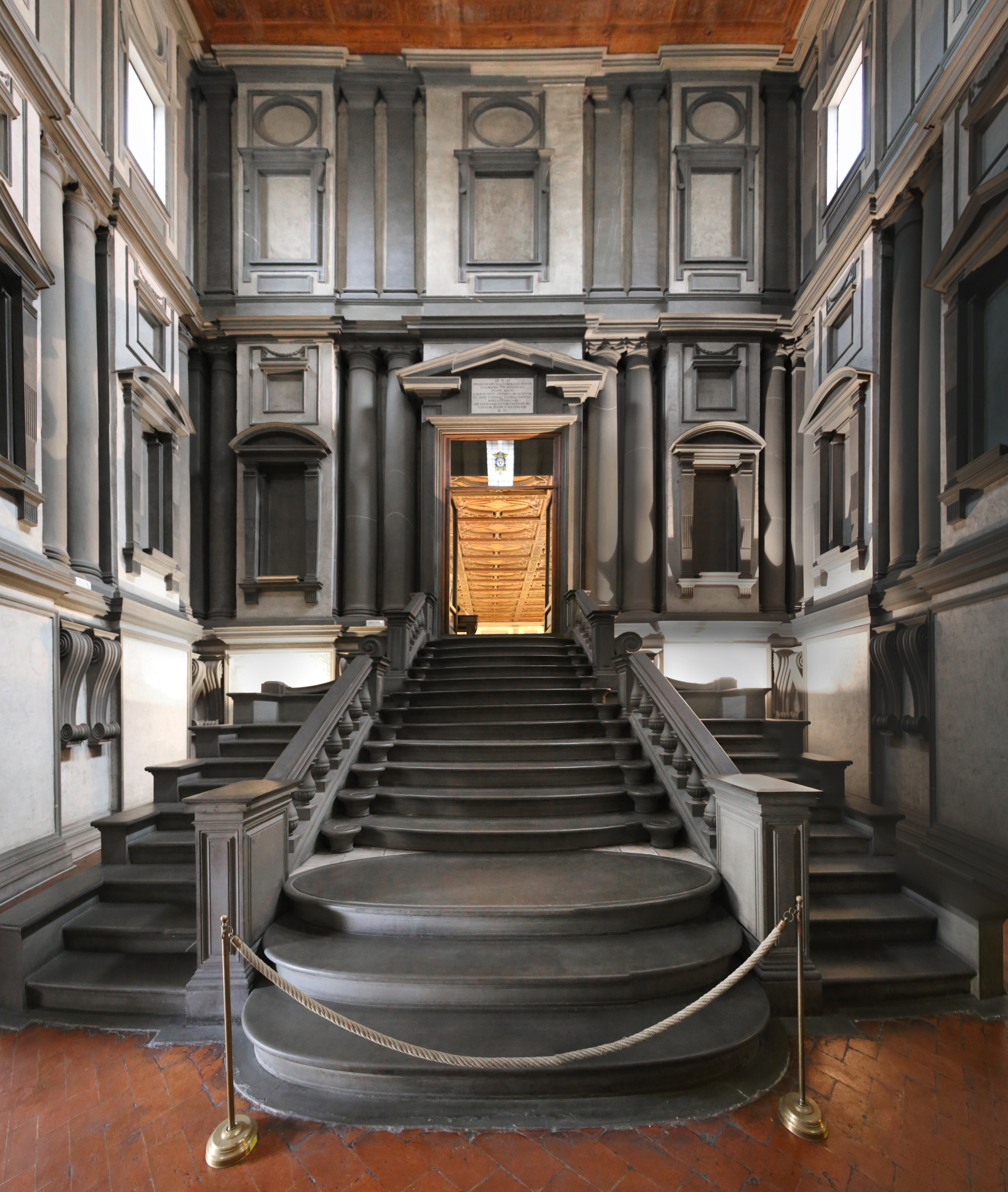
Staircase

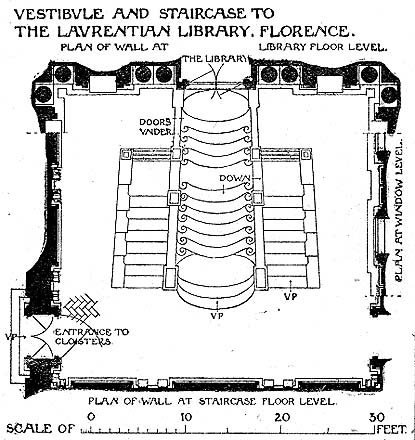
Vestibule plan, after Banister Fletcher

=== Staircase ===
The plan of the stairs changed dramatically in the design phase. Originally in the first design in 1524, two flights of stairs were placed against the side walls and formed a bridge in front of the reading room door. A year later, the stairway was moved to the middle of the vestibule. Tribolo attempted to carry out this plan in 1550, but nothing was built. Ammannati took on the challenge of interpreting Michelangelo's ideas to the best of his abilities using a small clay model, scanty material, and Michelangelo's instructions.

The staircase leads up to the reading room and takes up half of the floor of the vestibule. The treads of the centre flights are convex and vary in width, while the outer flights are straight. The three lowest steps of the central flight are wider and higher than the others, almost like concentric oval slabs. As the stairway descends, it divides into three flights.

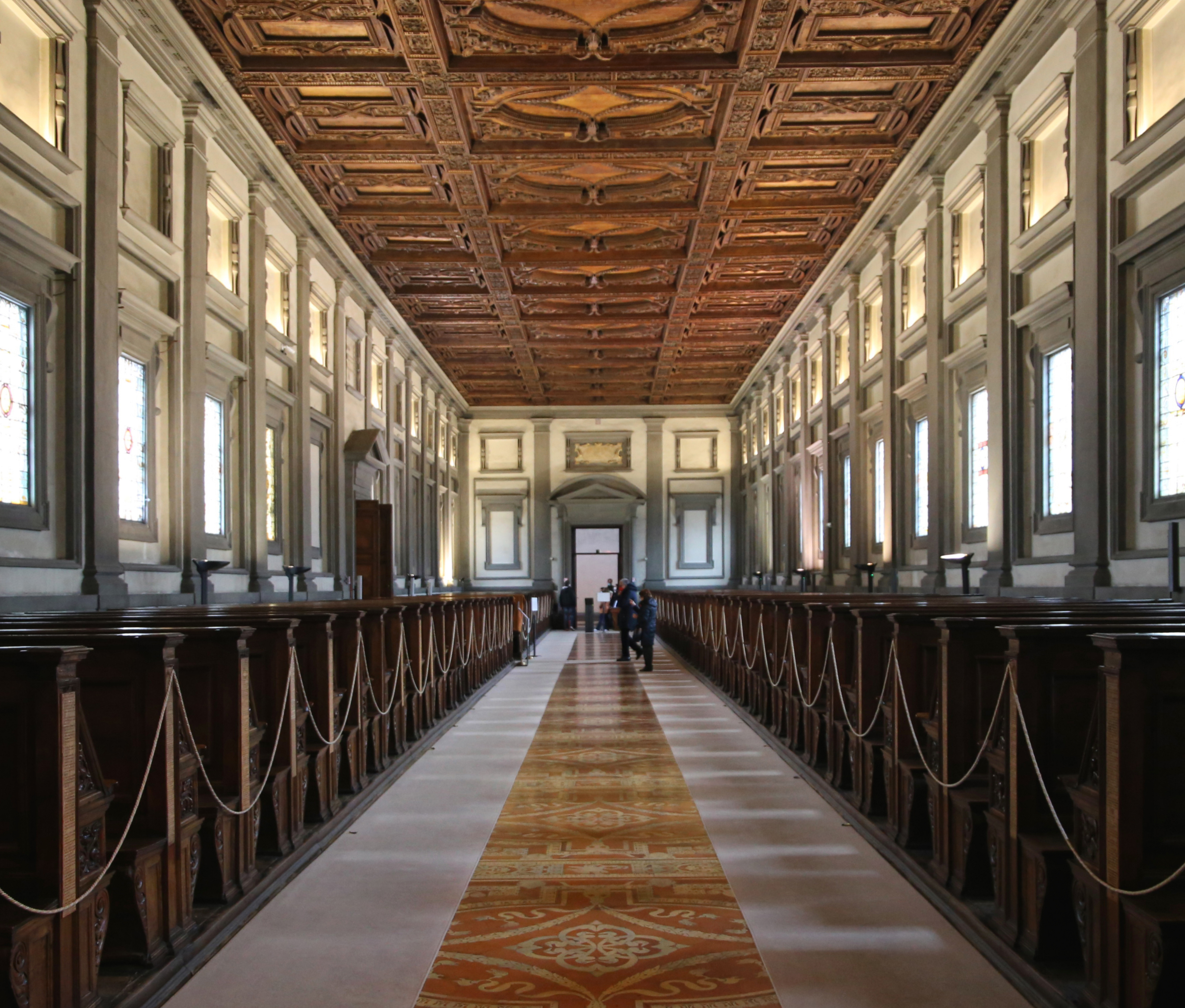
The reading room

=== Reading room ===
The reading room is 46.20 m. long, 10.50 m. wide, and 8.4 m. high (152 by 35 by 28 feet). There are two blocks of seats separated by a centre aisle with the backs of each seat serving as desks for the benches behind them. The desks are lit by the evenly spaced windows along the wall. The windows are framed by pilasters, forming a system of bays that articulate the layout of the ceiling and floor.

Because the reading room was built upon an existing story, Michelangelo had to reduce the weight of the reading-room walls. The system of frames and layers in the wall articulation reduced the volume and weight of the bays between the pilasters.

Beneath the current wooden floor of the library in the Reading Room is a series of 15 rectangular red and white terra cotta floor panels. These panels, measuring 8-foot-6-inch (2.59 m) on a side, when viewed in sequence demonstrate basic principles of geometry. It is believed that these tiles were arranged so as to be visible under the furniture originally planned; but this furniture was later changed to increase the number of reading desks in the room.

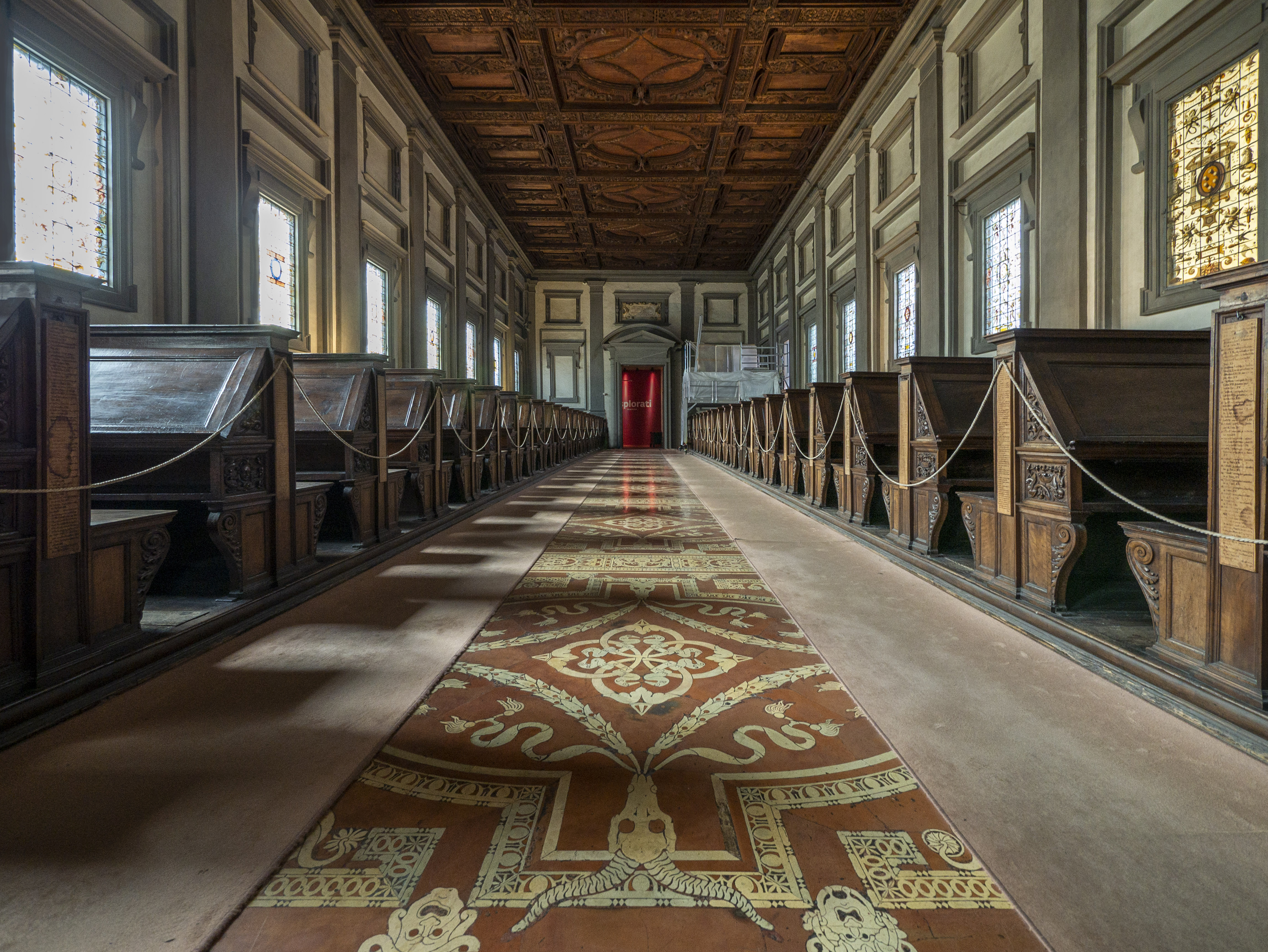
The reading room viewed from the top of the stairs

=== Interpretation ===
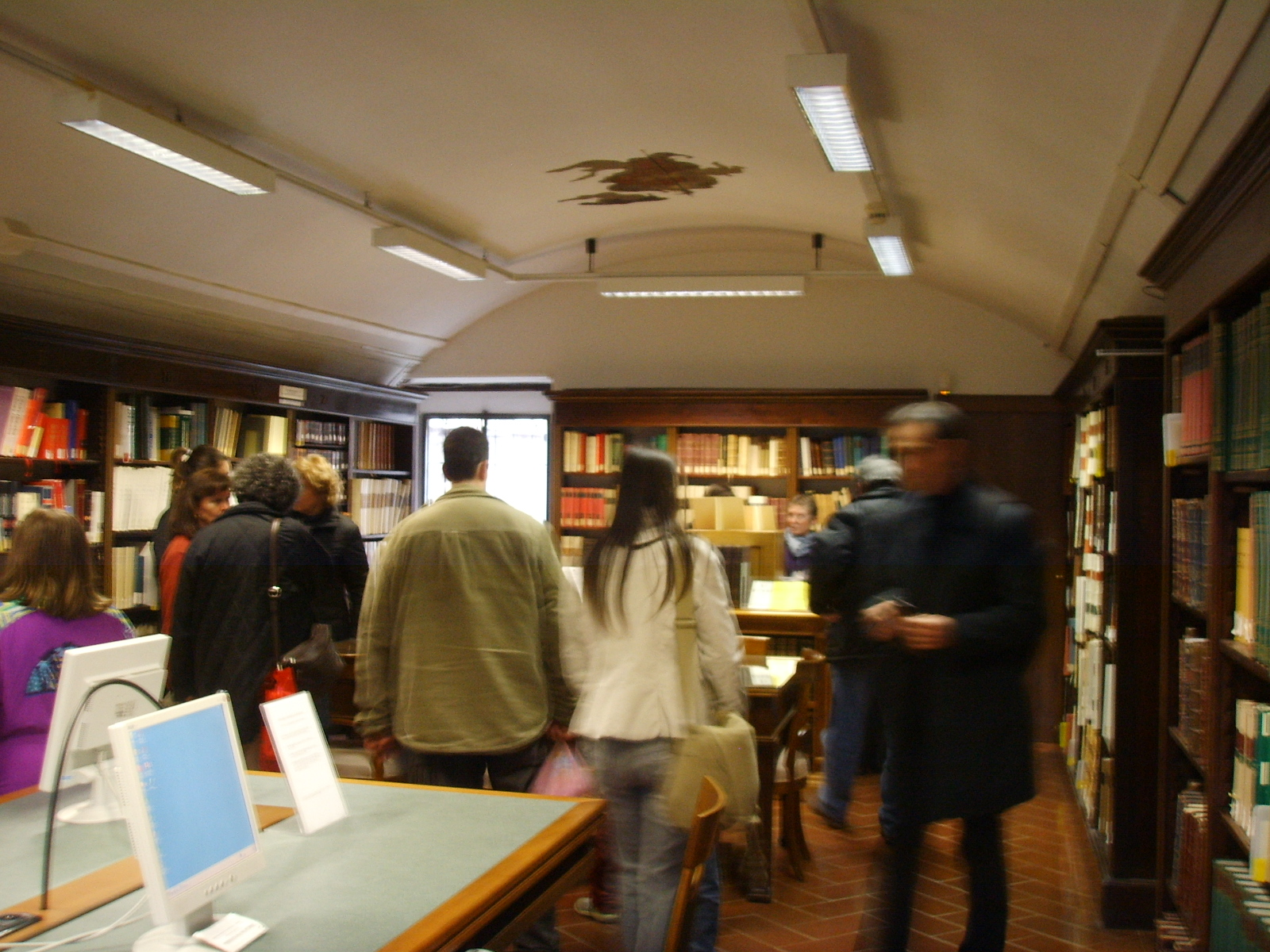
The Bibliotheca Medicea is also a fully modern scholarly library.

In the ricetto, critics have noted that the recessed columns in the vestibule make the walls resemble taut skin stretched between vertical supports. This caused the room to appear as if it mimics the human body, which at the time of the Italian Renaissance was believed to be the ideal form. The columns of the building also appear to be supported on corbels so that the weight seems to be carried on weak elements. Because of the seeming instability of the structure, the viewer cannot discern whether the roof is supported by the columns or the walls. This sense of ambiguity is heightened by the unorthodox forms of the windows and, especially, by the compressed quality of all architectural elements, which creates a sense of tension and constrained energy.

The use of the classical orders in the space is particularly significant. The recessed columns superficially appear to be of the austere and undecorated Doric order, typically considered to have a more masculine character. The Doric order would be placed at the base in a hierarchy of orders, as found in Roman buildings such as the Colosseum, with the Ionic, Composite, and Corinthian being progressively lighter and more decorative and feminine. However, closer examination establishes that the Composite order is used, but with the characteristic decorative acanthus leaves and diagonal volutes of the capitals stripped off, leaving the top of the column denuded. In architectural terms, the removal is an act of violence that is unprecedented in mannerism, and a sophistication that would not have escaped contemporary observers.

The dynamic sculpture of the staircase appears to pour forth like lava from the upper level and reduces the floor space of the vestibule in a highly unusual way. In the central flight, the convex treads vary in width, which makes the entire arrangement disquieting.

In sharp contrast to the vestibule and staircase, the reading room's evenly spaced windows set between pilasters in the side walls let in copious amounts of natural light and create a serene, quiet, and restful appearance.

== Contemporary culture ==
Mark Rothko stated that the vestibule and the walls in the staircase of the library influenced his 1959 Seagram murals.

External videos
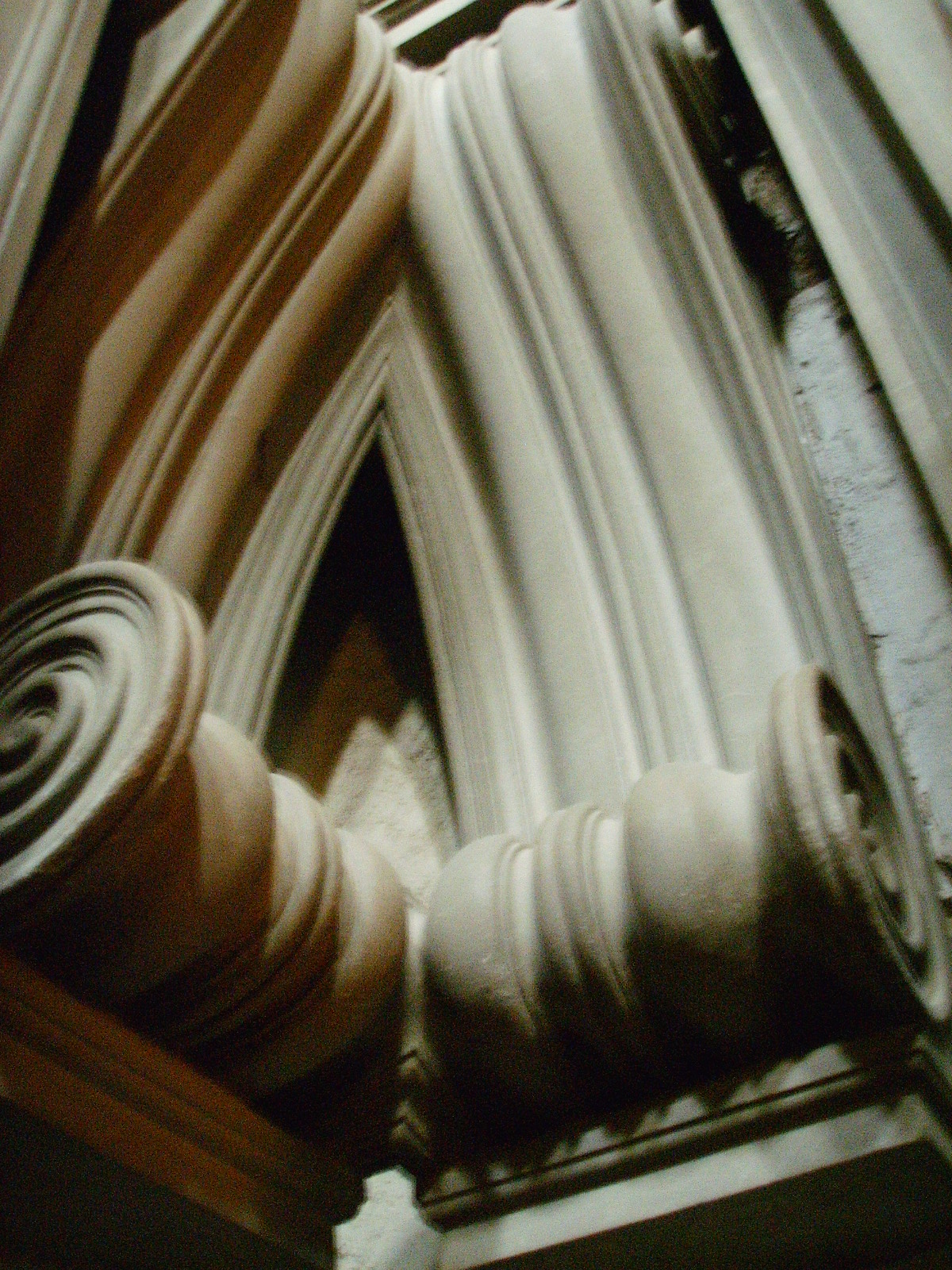
- Michelangelo, Laurentian Library, Smarthistory

== Collection ==
In 1571, Cosimo I, Grand Duke of Tuscany, opened the still-incomplete library to scholars. Notable additions to the collection were made by its most famous librarian, Angelo Maria Bandini, who was appointed in 1757 and oversaw its printed catalogues.

The Laurentian Library houses approximately 11,000 manuscripts, 2,500 papyri, 43 ostraca, 566 incunabula, 1,681 sixteenth-century prints, and 126,527 prints of the seventeenth to twentieth centuries. The core collection consists of approximately 3,000 manuscripts, indexed by Giovanni Rondinelli and Baccio Valori in 1589, which were placed on parapets (plutei) at the library's opening in 1571. These manuscripts have the signature Pluteus or Pluteo (Plut.). These manuscripts include the library the Medici collected during the fifteenth century, which were re-acquired by Giovanni di Medici (Pope Leo X) in 1508 and moved to Florence in the 1520s by Giulio di Giuliano de' Medici (Pope Clement VII). The Medici library was enlarged by collections assembled by Francesco Sassetti and Francesco Filelfo, manuscripts acquired by Leo X, and by the library of the Dominican convent of San Marco.

The library conserves the Nahuatl Florentine Codex, the major source of pre-conquest information about Aztec life in the western hemisphere. Among other well-known manuscripts in the Laurentian Library are the sixth-century Syriac Rabula Gospels; the Codex Amiatinus that contains the earliest surviving manuscript of the Latin Vulgate Bible; the Squarcialupi Codex that is an important early musical manuscript; and a papyrus which preserves part of the ancient Greek poet Erinna's long poem, the Distaff.

== See also ==
- Papyrus 35
- Papyrus 36
- Papyrus 89
- Uncial 0171
- Uncial 0174
- Minuscule 458
- Minuscule 619
- Minuscule 836 (Gregory-Aland)
