= Minuscule 1424 =

Greek minuscule manuscript

- New Testament manuscript
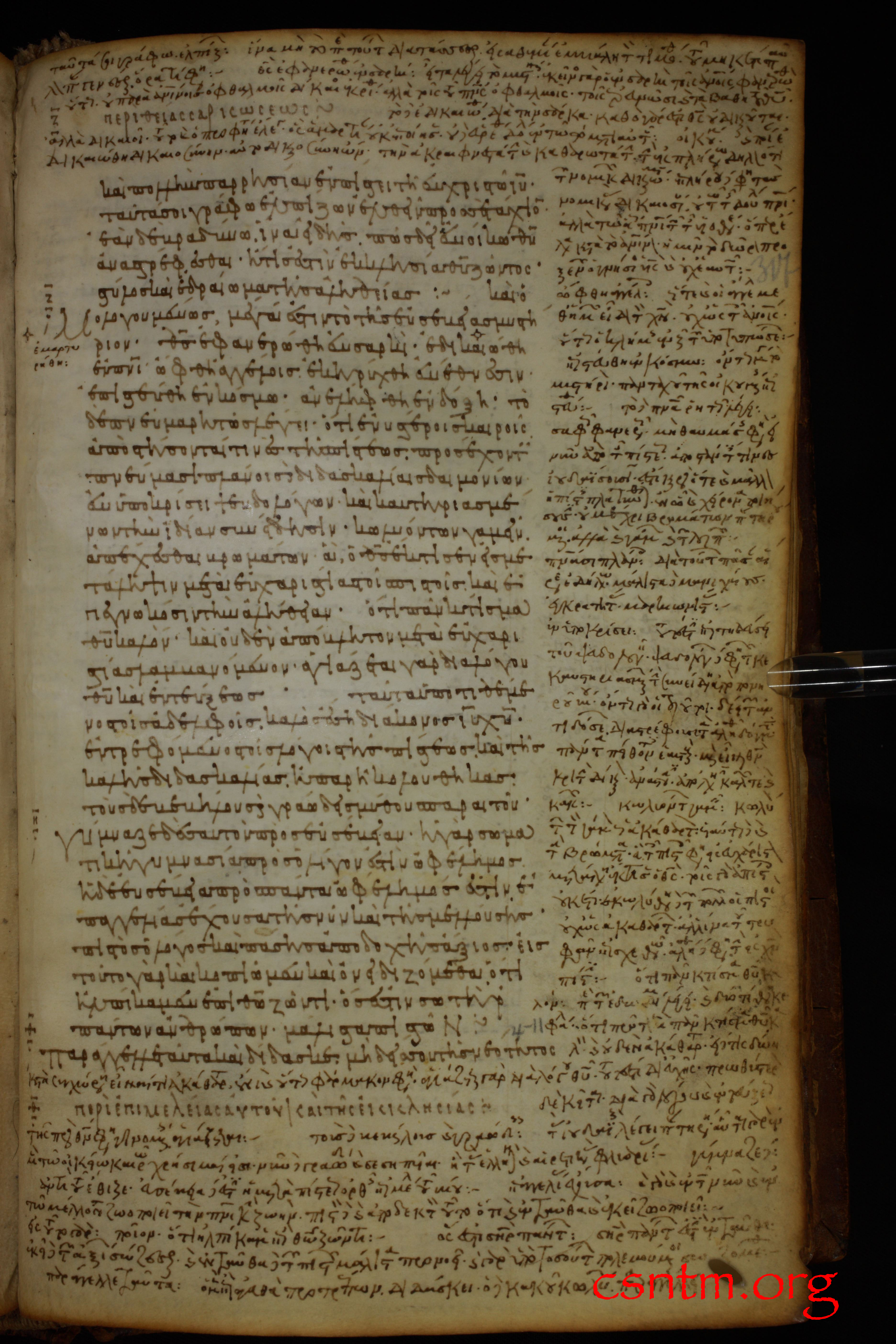
- Folio 317 recto of the codex
- Text: New Testament
- Date: 9/10th century
- Script: Greek
- Found: 1912-1913, in Ikosifinissa
- Now at: Lutheran School of Theology at Chicago
- Cite: Kenneth W. Clark, "A Descriptive Catalogue of Greek New Testament Manuscripts in North America". Chicago 1937, pp. 90-106.
- Size: 28 by 18 cm
- Type: Caesarean, Byzantine
- Category: III, V
- Note: belongs to the Family 1424

Minuscule 1424 (in the Gregory-Aland numbering of New Testament manuscripts), δ 30 (in the von Soden numbering of New Testament manuscripts) is a Greek minuscule manuscript of the New Testament, written on parchment. Using the study of comparative writing styles (palaeography), it has been dated to the 9th or 10th century. It is a catena manuscript, with the main New Testament text in the middle and a commentary surrounding it. The commentary was added several centuries later, likely in the 12th century.

== Description ==
The manuscript is a codex (precursor to the modern book), containing the entire New Testament with only one gap (this being Matthew 1:23-2:16) on 337 parchment leaves (sized 28 by 18 cm). The books follow in this order: Gospels, Acts, Catholic epistles, Revelation of John, Pauline epistles. The text is written in one column per page, 29-33 lines per page.

The tables of contents (known as κεφαλαια / kephalaia) are placed before each book, with the Eusebian Canon tables, numbers of the chapters (also known as κεφαλαια) in the margin, and their titles (known as τιτλοι / titloi) at the top of the pages. There is also a division according to the Ammonian Sections, with a references to the Eusebian Canons (an early division of the gospel books into sections), and the Euthalian Apparatus. The Eusebian Canons are present but likely added by a different, probably later, hand.

The manuscript is known as a catena manuscript, where the main text of the New Testament is written with a commentary from one or more of the early church fathers inscribed around or between the main text. The manuscript marginal comments are from the early church father John Chrysostom, however these are only present in the Gospels, Acts and the Epistles, with the book of Revelation lacking any commentary.

== Text ==
The Greek text of the codex is considered a representative of the Byzantine text-type, though with many non-Byzantine readings. Biblical scholar Burnett Hillman Streeter remarked some relationship between the codex and the supposed "Caesarean" witnesses, especially in the Gospel of Mark, but conceded it is only a tertiary witness to the type. However these variant readings are considered to be more in line with the Alexandrian readings than the Caesarean. The text-types are groups of different New Testament manuscripts which share specific or generally related readings, which then differ from each other group, and thus the conflicting readings can separate out the groups. These are then used to determine the original text as published; there are three main groups with names: Alexandrian, Western, and Byzantine. The Caesarean text-type however (initially identified by Streeter) has been contested by several text-critics, such as Kurt and Barbara Aland. According to biblical scholars Kurt and Barbara Aland, in the Gospel of Mark it agrees 88 times against the original text, 23 times supports the original text against the Byzantine, and 63 times it agrees with both. It also has 35 independent or distinctive readings. Kurt Aland placed the text of the codex in Category III for the Gospel of Mark, and in Category V for the rest of the books in his New Testament manuscript classification system. Category III manuscripts are described as having "a small but not a negligible proportion of early readings, with a considerable encroachment of [Byzantine] readings, and significant readings from other sources as yet unidentified." Category V manuscripts are described as "manuscripts with a purely or predominantly Byzantine text." It is one of only two catena manuscripts which are cited for variants in the gospel text in the Nestle-Aland critical edition of the New Testament (the other being Codex Zacynthius).

The manuscript belongs to Family 1424 together with M (021), 7, 27, 71, 115, 160, 179, 185, 267, 349, 517, 659, 692, 827, 945, 954, 990, 1010, 1082, 1188, 1194, 1207, 1223, 1391, 1402, 1606, 1675, 2191 and other manuscripts (which comprise von Soden's I ^{φ} group). The whole Family 1424 is currently thought to deserve more textual study than it has received.

According to the Claremont Profile Method it represents textual cluster 1675 in Luke 1, Luke 10, and Luke 20, as a diverging member.

Textual variants
Matthew 11:2

Ιησου (of Jesus) - 1424 D 0233 ℓ241

John 12:5

διακοσιων (two hundred) - 1424 ƒ^{13} 579 pc

== History ==
Currently it is dated by the INTF to the 9th or 10th century.

The codex was written by a monk named Sabas. It was formerly held in the monastery Ikosifinissa in Drama.Greece). The codex was taken after the Balkan Wars of 1912-1913 from Ikosifinissa to western Europe. It was brought by Franklin Gruber to Chicago. Biblical scholar Kirsopp Lake photographed the codex in 1902.

Until 2016 the codex was located in the Lutheran School of Theology at Chicago, as a part of the Gruber Collection (Gruber Ms. 152). In 2016, the LSTC decided to return and reinstate it at the monastery from which it originally came.

== See also ==
- List of New Testament minuscules (1001-2000)
- Family 1424
- Textual criticism
- Biblical manuscript
