= Minuscule 115 =

Manuscript

- New Testament manuscript
- Name: Harley MS 5559
- Text: Gospels
- Date: 11th
- Script: Greek
- Found: Smyrna, 1724
- Now at: British Library
- Size: 18.5 cm by 15 cm
- Type: Byzantine
- Category: none
- Note: member of Family 1424

Minuscule 115 (in the Gregory-Aland numbering), ε 1096 (Soden), is a Greek minuscule manuscript of the New Testament, on parchment leaves. Palaeographically it has been assigned to the 11th century. It has marginalia.

== Description ==
The codex contains the text of the four Gospels on 271 parchment leaves (size 18.5 cm by 15 cm) with some lacunae (Matt. 1:1-8:9; Mark 5:23-36; Luke 1:78-2:9; 6:4-15; John 11:2-end). The text is written in one column per page, in 19 lines per page.

It contains numbers of the κεφαλαια (chapters) at the margin, some τιτλοι (titles of chapters) at the top of the pages, the Ammonian Sections, and sometimes the Eusebian Canons.

== Text ==
Hermann von Soden included the manuscript to the group I^{fb}, together with manuscripts 7, 179, 267, 659, 827, and parts of 185, 1082, 1391, 1402, 1606. It is classified to the Family 1424.

Kurt Aland the Greek text of the codex did not place in any Category.

According to the Claremont Profile Method it represents textual family K^{x} in Luke 10. In Luke 1 and Luke 20 it has mixture of Byzantine families.

== History ==
In 1724 it belonged to Bernard Mould in Smyrna (as minuscule 116). It was examined by Griesbach, Bloomfield, and Scholz. C. R. Gregory saw it in 1883.

It is currently housed at the British Library (Harley MS 5559).

== See also ==
- List of New Testament minuscules
- Biblical manuscript
- Textual criticism
