= Minuscule 2817 =

- New Testament manuscript
- Name: Codex Basiliensis A. N. III. 11
- Text: Pauline epistles
- Date: 11/12th century
- Script: Greek
- Now at: Basel University Library
- Size: 28.5 cm by 21.5 cm
- Type: Byzantine text-type
- Category: V

Codex Basiliensis A. N. III. 11, known as Minuscule 2817 (in the Gregory-Aland numbering), α 287 (von Soden). Formerly it was labeled as 7^{pK} in all catalogs, but it was renumbered by Gregory, because two manuscripts had number 7 (7^{e} and 7^{p}). It is a Greek minuscule manuscript of the New Testament, dated palaeographically to the 12th century. Scrivener and the INTF date it to the 11th century.

== Description ==
The codex contains the text of the Pauline epistles, on 387 parchment pages with only one lacuna. The manuscript ends at Hebrews 12:18. It is written with one column per page, 28-32 lines per page. The text is written on a parchment in minuscule. It contains notes and glosses, which surround the biblical text in the top, outer, and bottom margins.

The Greek text of the Gospels is a representative of the Byzantine text-type. Hermann von Soden classified it as I^{fb} (together with minuscules 115, 179, 267, 659, 827). Aland placed it in Category V. It is part of the textual family K^{x}.

In Ephesians 1:8 it contains the Textus Receptus reading of διανοιας rather than the majority reading καρδίας. In Ephesians 3:9 it contains the Textus Receptus reading of κοινωνια in the text and catena rather than the majority reading "οικονομία".

== History of the codex ==
This codex was used by Erasmus in his Novum Testamentum. It was used also by Robert Estienne (known as Stephanus) in his Editio Regia (1550), who designated it as ς'. In result its readings became a part of the Textus Receptus.

The codex is located now at the Basel University Library (Cod. A. N. III. 11), in Basel.

== See also ==
- List of New Testament minuscules (2001–)
- Textus Receptus
- Biblical manuscript
- Textual criticism
