= Minuscule 507 =

- New Testament manuscript
- Text: Gospels
- Date: 11th-century
- Script: Greek
- Now at: Christ Church, Oxford
- Size: 28.5 cm by 21 cm
- Type: Byzantine text-type
- Category: V
- Note: full marginalia

Minuscule 507 (in the Gregory-Aland numbering), ε 142 (in the Soden numbering), is a Greek minuscule manuscript of the New Testament, on parchment. Palaeographically it has been assigned to the 11th century. Scrivener labeled it by number 493. It was adapted for liturgical use.

== Description ==
The codex contains the complete text of the four Gospels on 221 parchment leaves (size 28.5 cm by 21 cm). It is written in two columns per page, 26 lines per page.

The text is divided according to numbers of the κεφαλαια (chapters), whose numbers are given at the margin, with τιτλοι (titles) at the top of the pages. There is also a division according to the smaller Ammonian Sections (in Mark 234 sections, the last section in 16:9), with references to the Eusebian Canons (written in the same line as Ammonian Sections). (Note: In the same way are arranged codices: 112, 192, 198, 212, 267, 583, 584.)

It contains (Epistula ad Carpianum later hand), Eusebian Canon tables, (prolegomena later hand), tables of the κεφαλαια (tables of contents) are placed before each Gospel, lectionary markings at the margin (partly later), incipits, Synaxarion (liturgical book with hagiographies), subscriptions at the end of each Gospel (some from later hand), ρηματα, and numbers of στιχοι.

== Text ==
The Greek text of the codex is a representative of the Byzantine text-type. Hermann von Soden included it to the textual family K^{x}. Aland placed it in Category V.

According to the Claremont Profile Method it represents textual family K^{x} in Luke 1 and Luke 20. In Luke 10 no profile was made.

== History ==
The manuscript was written by Abraham Teudas, a scribe. In 1724 (or 1727) the manuscript came from the Pantokratoros monastery to England and was presented to archbishop of Canterbury, William Wake, along with the codices 73, 74, 506-520. Wake presented it to Christ Church in Oxford. In 1732 John Walker slightly collated it for Bentley.

The manuscript was added to the list of New Testament minuscule manuscripts by F. H. A. Scrivener (493) and C. R. Gregory (507). Gregory saw it in 1883.

It is currently housed at Christ Church (Wake 21) in Oxford.

== See also ==
- List of New Testament minuscules
- Biblical manuscript
- Textual criticism
