= Minuscule 583 =

- New Testament manuscript
- Name: Ms. Pal. 5
- Text: Gospels
- Date: 11th century
- Script: Greek
- Now at: Biblioteca Palatina, Parma
- Size: 30 cm by 24 cm
- Type: Byzantine text-type
- Category: V

Minuscule 583 (in the Gregory-Aland numbering), ε 124 (von Soden), is a Greek minuscule manuscript of the New Testament, on parchment. Palaeographically it has been assigned to the 11th century. The manuscript has complex contents. It was labeled by Scrivener as 452.

== Description ==
The codex contains a complete text of the four Gospels on 285 leaves (size 30 cm by 24 cm). The text is written in one column per page, 21 lines per page.

It contains Epistula ad Carpianum, Eusebian tables, "hypothesis" (explanatory of using the Eusebian Canons), lists of the κεφαλαια before every Gospel, numerals of the κεφαλαια at the margin, the τιτλοι at the top, the Ammonian sections (in Mark 234 - 16:9), the Eusebian Canons (in the same line as the number of Ammonian Section), (Note: In the same way arranged codices 192, 198, 212, 267, 507, 584.) lectionary markings (for liturgical use), incipits, Synaxarion, Menologion, and numerous pictures. The first page of the Gospel and some other portions of the manuscript are decorated in gold, with luxurious miniatures.

== Text ==
The Greek text of the codex is a representative of the Byzantine text-type. Aland placed it in Category V. According to the Claremont Profile Method it represents the textual family K^{x} in Luke 1 and Luke 20. In Luke 10 no profile was made. It creates textual cluster with the minuscule 112.

== History ==
The manuscript once belonged to the Bonsivi family, then it was transferred to the public library at Lucca.

The manuscript currently housed in at the Biblioteca Palatina in Parma (Ms. Pal. 5).

== See also ==
- List of New Testament minuscules
- Biblical manuscript
- Textual criticism
