= Minuscule 198 =

- New Testament manuscript
- Text: Matthews
- Date: 13th century
- Script: Greek
- Now at: Laurentian Library
- Size: 24 cm by 16.8 cm
- Type: Byzantine text-type
- Category: V
- Note: marginalia

Minuscule 198 (in the Gregory-Aland numbering), ε 311 (Soden), is a Greek minuscule manuscript of the New Testament, on cotton paper. Palaeographically it has been assigned to the 13th century. It has full marginalia.

== Description ==
The codex contains a complete text of the four Gospels on 171 cotton paper leaves (size 24 cm by 16.8 cm). The text is written in one column per page, in 29 lines per page (size of text 17 by 10.2 cm). The first leaf was supplied by later hand (paper). The paper is brown, ink is brown.

The text is divided according to the κεφαλαια (chapters), whose numbers are given at the margin. There is also a division according to the Ammonian Sections (in Mark 241 Sections – 16:20), with references to the Eusebian Canons (after Mark ιδ in the same line as Ammonian Sections – see codex 112). (Note: In the same way arranged codices 112, 192, 212, 267, 507, 583, 584.)

It contains the Epistula ad Carpianum, the Eusebian Canon tables, tables of the κεφαλαια (tables of contents) before each Gospel, lectionary markings at the margin (for liturgical use), incipits, (no αναγνωσεις), and subscriptions at the end of each Gospel.

== Text ==
The Greek text of the codex is a representative of the Byzantine text-type. Aland placed it in Category V.

== History ==
Formerly the manuscript belonged to the Aedilium Florenz Ecclaesium.

It was examined by Bandini, Birch, Scholz, and Burgon. C. R. Gregory saw it in 1886.

It is currently housed at the Laurentian Library (Aedilium 221), at Florence.

== See also ==
- List of New Testament minuscules
- Biblical manuscript
- Textual criticism
