= Minuscule 584 =

- New Testament manuscript
- Name: Ms. Parm. 65
- Text: Gospels
- Date: 10th century
- Script: Greek
- Now at: Biblioteca Palatina
- Size: 18.5 cm by 13.5 cm
- Type: Byzantine text-type
- Category: V

Minuscule 584 (in the Gregory-Aland numbering), ε 1010 (von Soden), is a Greek minuscule manuscript of the New Testament, on parchment. Palaeographically it has been assigned to the 10th century. The manuscript is lacunose. It was labelled by Scrivener as 453.

== Description ==
The codex contains the text of the four Gospels on 319 leaves (size 18.5 cm by 13.5 cm) with only one lacuna (Matthew 1:1-20). It is written in one column per page, 20 lines per page.

The text is divided according to the κεφαλαια (bigger sections) and according to the Ammonian Sections (smaller sections). The lists of the κεφαλαια are placed before every Gospel, numerals of the κεφαλαια are given at the margin, and their τιτλοι on the top. Numerals of the Ammonian sections (in Mark 234 sections, the last in 16:9), with references to the Eusebian Canons, whose are given in the same line as number of Ammonian Sections (see Minuscule 112, 583). (Note: In the same way arranged codices 192, 198, 212, 267, 507, and 583.)

It contains Epistula ad Carpianum, Eusebian tables at the beginning of the manuscript. It contains lectionary markings at the margin, incipits, subscriptions at the end of books, and marginal notes. It is very tastefully decorated. Some marginal corrections were made by the first hand in vermilion.

== Text ==
The Greek text of the codex is a representative of the Byzantine text-type. Aland placed it in Category V. According to Claremont Profile Method it represents the textual family K^{x} in Luke 1, Luke 10, and Luke 20. It creates cluster with Codex Athous Dionysiou.

It lacks the Pericope Adulterae (John 7:53-8:11).

== History ==
It is dated by the INTF to the 10th-century.

The manuscript currently housed in at the Biblioteca Palatina (Ms. Parm. 65), at Parma.

== See also ==
- List of New Testament minuscules
- Biblical manuscript
- Textual criticism
