= Family 1424 =

Group of New Testament manuscripts

Family 1424 is a group of New Testament manuscripts. It is classified to the Byzantine text-type as one of the textual subfamilies of this group, though it has many non-Byzantine readings (Caesarean). Name of the family came from the number of Minuscule 1424 designated by number 1424 according to the Gregory-Aland numbering. According to Kurt Aland to this family belong manuscripts: M (021), 7, 27, 71, 115, 160, 179, 185, 267, 349, 517, 659, 692, 827, 945, 954, 990, 1010, 1082, 1188, 1194, 1207, 1223, 1391, 1402, 1424, 1606, 1675, 2191 and other manuscripts belongs to the Family 1424 (von Soden's I^{φ} group). It has a number of non-Byzantine readings, they are Alexandrian.

Some of these manuscripts are not classified to the Byzantine text-type. Aland stated, that "the whole of Family 1424 deserves a more thorough textual study than it has yet received".

== See also ==
- Family Π
- Family E
- Family K^{r}
- Family 1739
