= Francesco Maria Ottieri =

Italian historian

Conte-Marchese Francesco Maria Ottieri (8 July 1665 – 13 May 1742) was an Italian historian who wrote an eight volume chronicle about the War of the Spanish Succession (1701–14). It was written between 1716 and 1735.

He was born in Florence, son of the Count of Montorio and Sopano, and the daughter of the marquis of Piancastagnajo. His father died when he was but five years old, and he grew up with his mother, the Marchesa Minerva. He was assigned as a page in the court of Grand-Duke Cosimo III de' Medici, where he would have met the librarian Magliabecchi and the scientist Redi. He studied in Florence. He was able to obtain funds to travel at the age of 17 years through Europe, visiting Paris, England, the Netherlands, and Vienna. He accompanied to Rome his sister, who was married to the Florentine senator Andrea del Rosso. In Rome, he married Olimpia Maidalchini, who was related to the mother of Pope Innocent X, and to the Cardinasl Maidalchini, Spada, and Carpegna. Unable to land an appointment in the papal bureaucracy, he set himself to writing the history of the recent wars. Among his patrons was Cardinal Domenico Passionei, but this did not prevent the work from being suppressed and placed on the Index of Prohibited Books. For years he labored at reworking the initial volumes to make them palatable for publication. Not till the Papacy of Benedict XIV did he find support in completing an publishing the work.
