= Minuscule 192 =

- New Testament manuscript
- Text: Gospels
- Date: 13th century
- Script: Greek
- Now at: Laurentian Library
- Size: 12 cm by 8.8 cm
- Type: Byzantine text-type
- Category: V
- Note: marginalia

Minuscule 192 (in the Gregory-Aland numbering), ε 313 (Soden), is a Greek minuscule manuscript of the New Testament, on parchment. Palaeographically it has been assigned to the 13th century. It has complex contents, with full marginalia.

== Description ==
The codex contains a complete text of the four Gospels on 200 thick parchment leaves (size 12 cm by 8.8 cm). The text is written in one column per page, in 28 lines per page.

The text is divided according to the κεφαλαια (chapters), whose numbers are given at the margin, the τιτλοι (titles) at the top of the pages. There is also another division according to the Ammonian Sections (in Mark 236), with references to the Eusebian Canons (in the same line with the Ammonian Sections). (Note: In the same way arranged codices 112, 198, 212, 267, 507, 583, 584.)

It contains Prolegomena, tables of the κεφαλαια (tables of contents) before each Gospel, lectionary markings at the margin (for liturgical reading), incipits, and subscriptions at the end of each Gospel.

== Text ==
The Greek text of the codex is a representative of the Byzantine text-type. Aland placed it in Category V. According to the Claremont Profile Method it represents the textual family Π171.

== History ==
The manuscript was examined by Birch, Scholz, and Burgon. C. R. Gregory saw it in 1886.

It is currently housed at the Laurentian Library (Plutei. VI. 30), at Florence.

== See also ==
- List of New Testament minuscules
- Biblical manuscript
- Textual criticism
