= Minuscule 879 =

- New Testament manuscript
- Name: Cod. Ottobonianus gr. 100
- Text: Gospels †
- Date: 16th century
- Script: Greek
- Now at: Vatican Library
- Size: 32.5 cm by 23 cm
- Type: Byzantine
- Category: none
- Note: marginalia

Minuscule 879 (in the Gregory-Aland numbering), N^{λ68} (von Soden), is a 16th-century Greek minuscule manuscript of the New Testament on parchment. It has not complex contents.

== Description ==
The codex contains the text of the Gospel of Lukes 6,29-12,10 on 105 paper leaves (size 32.5 cm by 23 cm), with a commentary. The text is written in one column per page, 28 lines per page.

== Text ==
The Greek text of the codex Kurt Aland did not place it in any Category. It was not examined by the Claremont Profile Method.

== History ==
According to F. H. A. Scrivener and C. R. Gregory it was written in the 16th century. Currently the manuscript is dated by the INTF to the 16th century. Probably it was rewritten from minuscule 853.

The manuscript was added to the list of New Testament manuscripts by Scrivener (704^{e}), Gregory (879^{e}). Gregory saw it in 1886.

It was examined and described by Ernesto Feron and Fabiano Battaglini (like minuscule 878) and 880).

Currently the manuscript is housed at the Vatican Library (Ottob. gr. 100), in Rome.

== See also ==
- List of New Testament minuscules (1–1000)
- Biblical manuscript
- Textual criticism
- Minuscule 878
