= Minuscule 848 =

- New Testament manuscript
- Text: Gospel of Luke
- Date: 14th century
- Script: Greek
- Now at: Biblioteca Angelica
- Size: 24.3 cm by 18 cm
- Type: Byzantine text-type
- Category: V
- Note: commentary

Minuscule 848 (in the Gregory-Aland numbering), Θ^{ε47} (von Soden), is a 14th-century Greek minuscule manuscript of the New Testament on parchment. The manuscript has no complex content.

== Description ==
The codex contains the text of the Gospel of Luke on 442 parchment leaves (size 24.3 cm by 18 cm), with a catena. The text is written in one column per page, 21 lines per page. The biblical text is surrounded by a catena, the commentary is of Theophylact's authorship.

It contains Prolegomena at the beginning and the tables of the κεφαλαια (tables of contents) before the Gospel.

== Text ==
The Greek text of the codex is a representative of the Byzantine text-type. Kurt Aland the Greek text of the codex did not place in any Category V. According to the Claremont Profile Method it represents the textual family K^{x} in Luke 10 and Luke 20. In Luke 1 it has mixed text. It belongs to the textual pair with 1255.

== History ==
F. H. A. Scrivener dated the manuscript to the 11th century, C. R. Gregory dated it to the 14th century. Currently the manuscript is dated by the INTF to the 14th century.

The manuscript once belonged to Cardinal Domenico Passionei. It was examined and described (with a facsimile) by Giuseppe Bianchini.

The manuscript was added to the list of New Testament manuscripts by Scrivener (611^{e}) and Gregory (848^{e}). C. R. Gregory saw it in 1886.

Currently the manuscript is housed at the Biblioteca Angelica (Ms. 21), in Rome.

== See also ==
- List of New Testament minuscules
- Biblical manuscript
- Textual criticism
- Minuscule 847
