= Biblioteca Angelica =

Oldest public library in Europe

Coordinates: 41°54′03″N 12°28′29″E

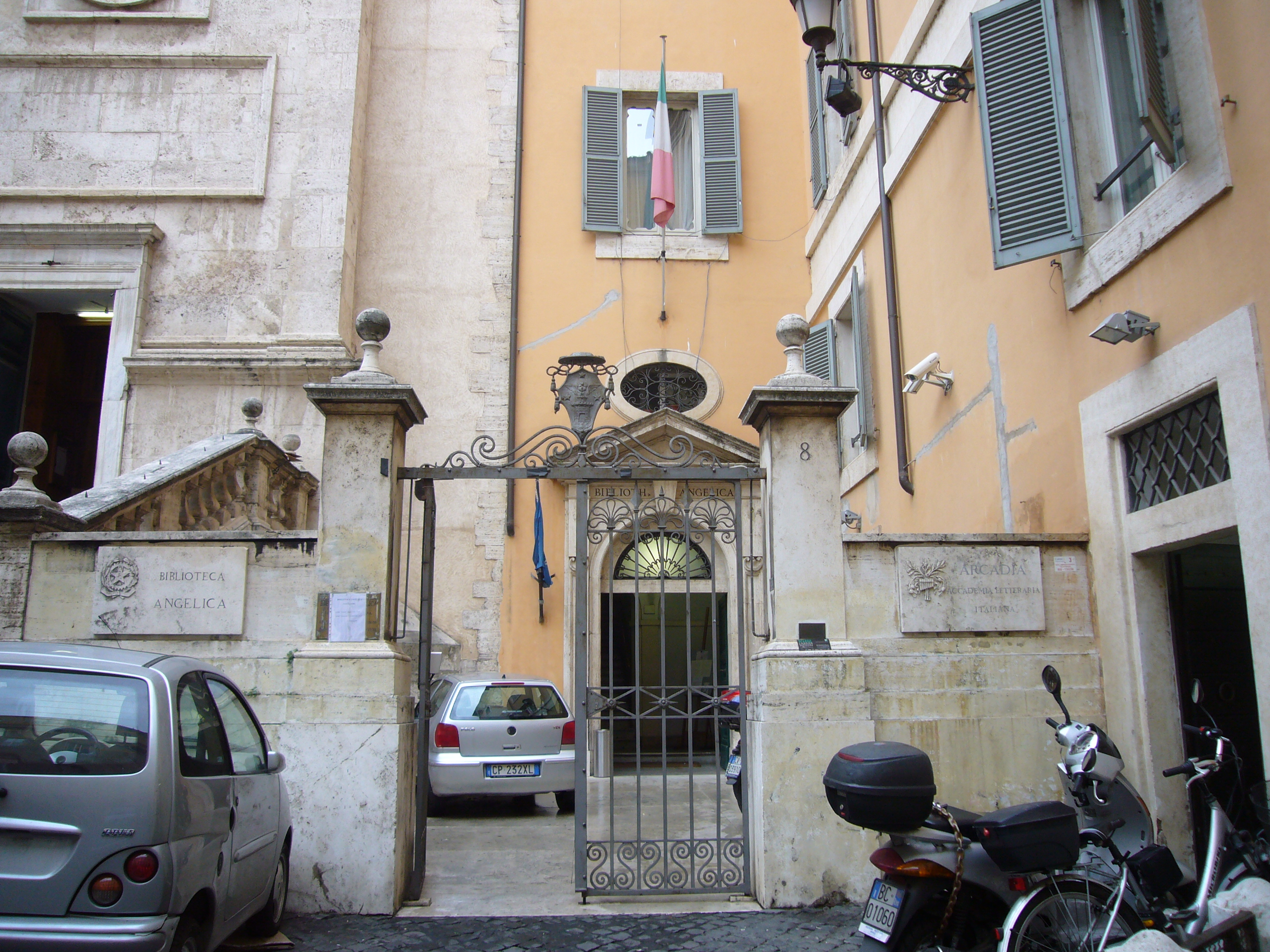
- The entrance of Angelica Library
- Location: P.zza S. Agostino, 8, Rome, Italy
- Type: Public library
- Established: 1604; 422 years ago

Collection
- Size: >200.000 printed items and manuscripts

Other information
- Director: Umberto D'Angelo
- Website: bibliotecaangelica.cultura.gov.it

The Biblioteca Angelica (English: Angelica Library) is a public library located in Rome, Italy. In front of the Piazza Sant'Agostino square, adjacent to the church of Sant'Agostino, not far from Piazza Navona. Having been open to the public since 1609, it is considered the oldest public library in Europe along with the Biblioteca Ambrosiana in Milan and the Bodleian in Oxford.

The library holds about over 200,000 volumes, about half of which makes up the 'fondo antico' (15th–18th century editions). Manuscripts number about 2,700, mostly Latin but also Greek and Oriental (among them Codex Angelicus), incunabula 1,100, 16th century editions about 20,000. These works are important for our knowledge of the history of the Reformation and Counter-Reformation.

== History ==
=== Origins ===
The library was established in 1604 (422 years ago) by the Augustinian bishop and papal sacristan Angelo Rocca, and belonged to the Augustinian monastery. Its founder, in whose honor the library is still named the Biblioteca Angelica, was an erudite scholar and keen collector of rare editions. His library was one of the most complete private collections in Rome, possessing over 20,000 volumes.

At the end of 1500 Rocca planned to donate his collection to the Augustinian Order and to place it at the disposal of the public as evidenced by a Pontifical Letter of 1595, wherein Pope Clement VIII accorded him the right to donate the library. This authorization was renewed by Paul V, and only in 1614 the instrument of conveyance was executed. The instrument, under which the transfer of the ownership title to the library over to the Convent of Sant'Agostino in Rome was effected, was associated with several clauses: 1) the library shall not be considered as coenobitic; and hence the Augustinian Fathers shall be allowed to go in as scholars and not as owners; 2) the library shall not be moved from the premises purposely built for it.

The question of finding suitable premises for housing the library was in all likelihood the cause for the delay in carrying Rocca's plan into effect. He himself took on the assignment of purchasing little buildings standing in close proximity of the Church of Sant'Agostino, that were altered to meet requirements. He, further, endowed the library with independent incomes, with an initial capital composed of seven mountain places yielding 24 scudi per annum.

In 1614, the library was joined to the convent library of Sant'Agostino, which numbered about 20,000 books. By fra Angelo's testament – he was a bishop and here dispensed from the vow of poverty – his library should be open to everyone regardless of income or social standing. Thus the Angelica became one the first public libraries in Italy. In his seminal work Advis pour dresser une bibliothèque (1644) the French scholar and librarian Gabriel Naudé asserted that only three libraries in all Europe granted in his times regular access to every scholar, namely the Bodleian, the Ambrosiana and the Angelica.

=== Later 17th and 18th centuries ===
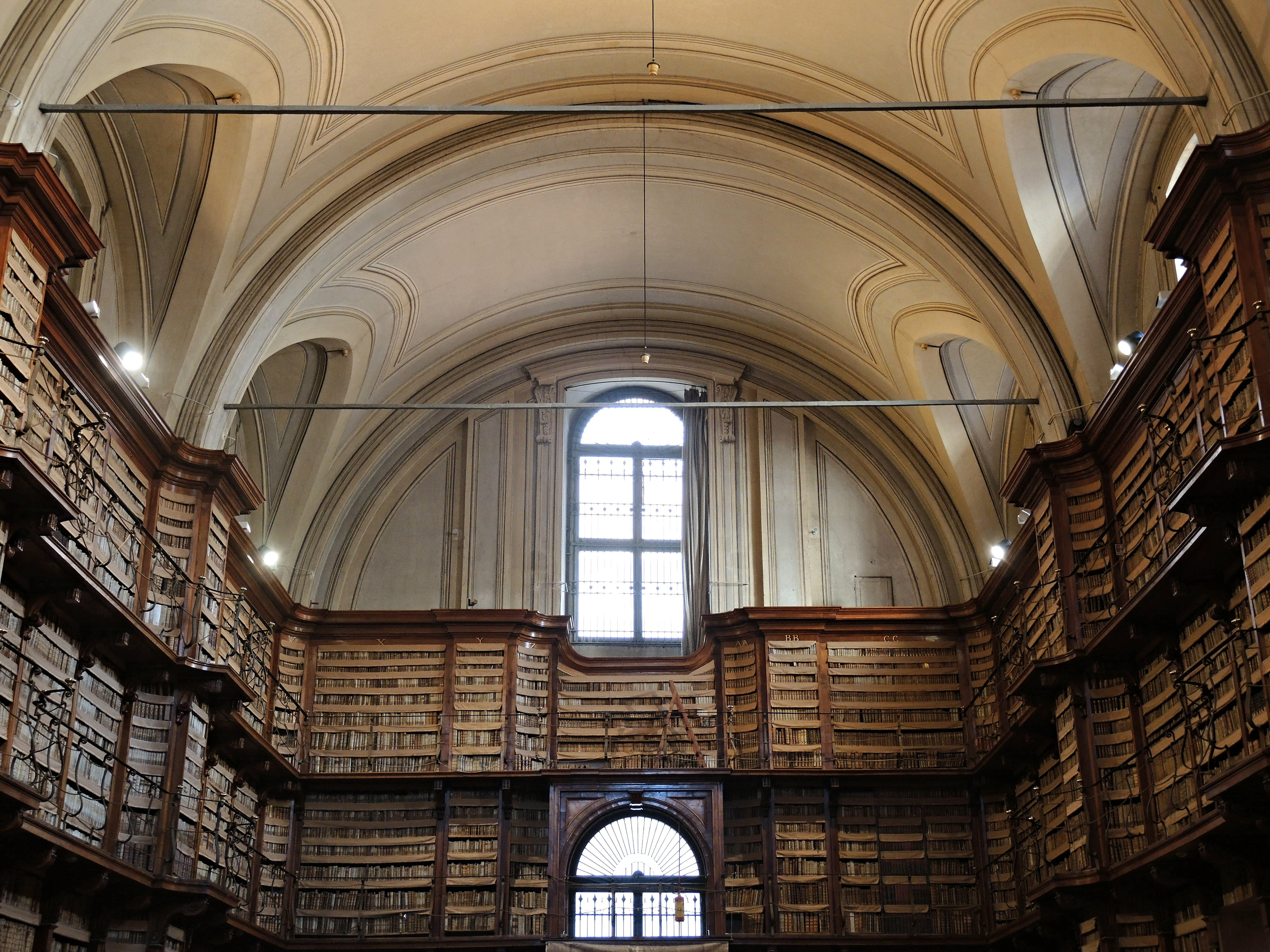
The Ancient Hall of the Biblioteca Angelica. The architecture of the hall is attributed to Luigi Vanvitelli

The two great collections, that is, those of the monastery of Sant'Agostino and of Rocca, augmented by later gifts of brethren and benefactors, constantly increased. In 1661 the German humanist Lucas Holstenius, caretaker of the Vatican Library, bequeathed to the Biblioteca Angelica his precious collection of about 3,000 volumes. In 1704, the great library of the Augustinian Cardinal Henry Noris was turned over to the Angelica. The library of Cardinal Domenico Silvio Passionei was purchased for the Augustinians in 1762 and at the same time the present spacious library was rebuilt, and the books were completely catalogued by three hard-working friars, namely Cosmas Schmalfus, Richard Tecker and Daniele Marcolini. The 54 volumes in folio which compose the old catalogue, made by Schmalfus and Tecker, are still in daily use. Unfortunately the catalogue of the manuscripts, made by Marcolini, has been lost.

The Angelica underwent several renovations in the seventeenth century (by Borromini) and eighteenth century (by Luigi Vanvitelli and Carlo Murena). Vanvitelli, designed the monumental hall on the first floor, completed in 1765. The hall, known as the Vanvitelli's “vase” because of its shape, is characterized by a rectangular plan, barrel vault and a precious wooden shelving by Nicola Fagioli.

=== 19th century and after ===
The library was taken from the order in 1873, when the Italian government suppressed the religious houses in Rome. Since 1975, it has been under the supervision of the Ministry of Culture. By the 20th century, the library's collection has grown considerably: worthy of mention are the acquisitions of the 19th–20th century letters of the poet Domenico Gnoli and archaeologist Felice Barnabei and, since 2000, those of the literary critic Arnaldo Bocelli (1900–1974), whose library (about 10,000 volumes) is also in the possession of the Angelica. Since the nineties, especial care has been taken to increasing bibliographical instruments and means of consultation, also on non-paper support materials. In 2004 a historical symposium was held at the Angelica to highlight its contribution to learning over the centuries.

== Collection ==
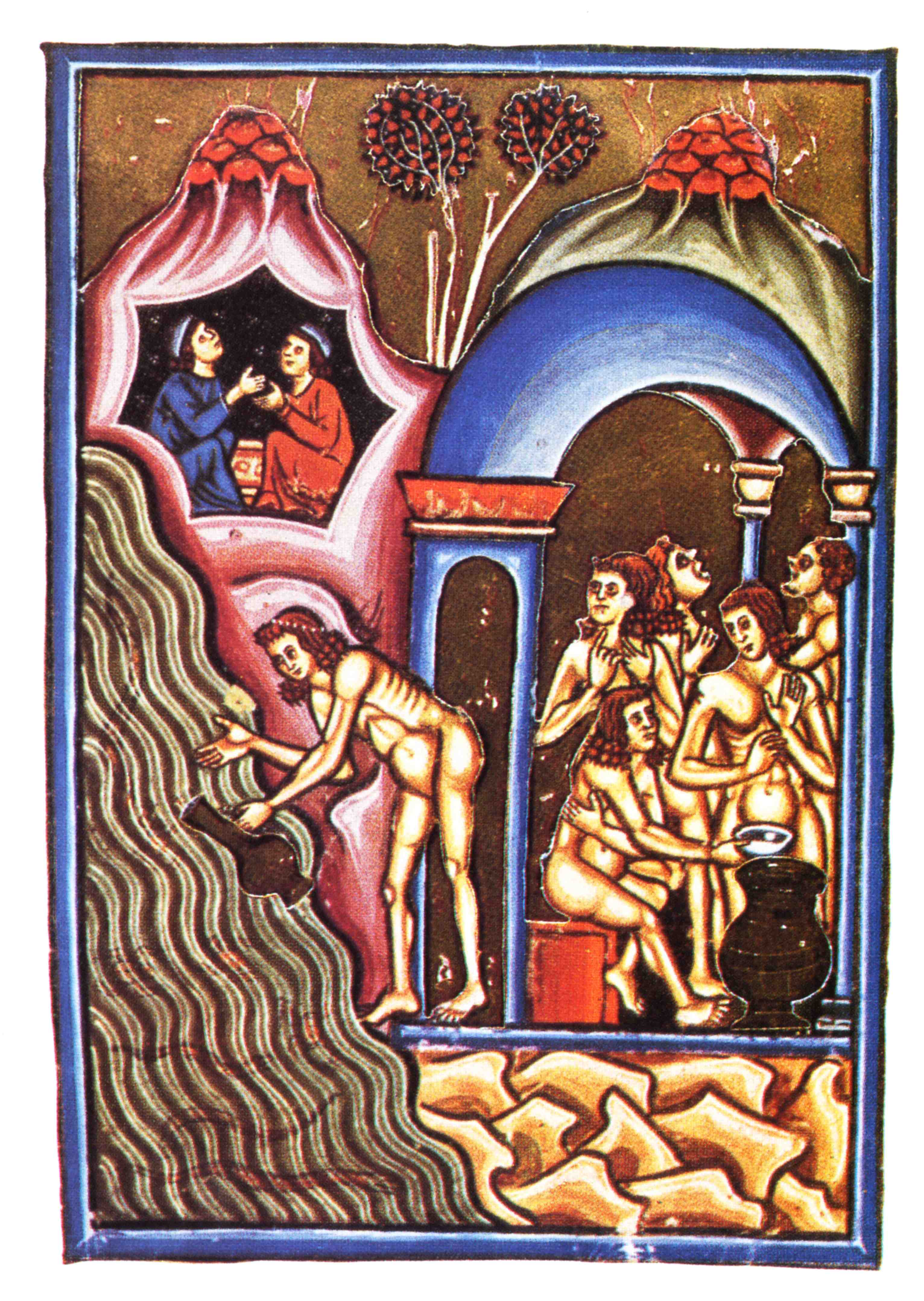
Illumination from De balneis Puteolanis -late 13th century manuscript, MS 1474, Biblioteca Angelica in Rome

The library specialises in ecclesiastical studies and in historical literary studies. At present it has a collection of 200,000 volumes, and is one of the best supplied Italian libraries in-so-far as manuscripts and incunabula are concerned.

The manuscripts are divided in accordance with their set of origin. They come chiefly from the ancient Augustinian convent of Santa Maria del Popolo, from the Rocca, Holstenius and Passionei funds and from diverse inheritances previous to 1870. The following are particularly valuable: the four Evangeli, a parchment manuscript of the IXth Century; a Saint Gregory of the XIth Century; several codes in the Greek language including an Iliad of the XIIth Century; a Syriac Gospel of the VIIth century; a Commedia by Dante Alighieri with coloured initials for every chapter and illustrations for every book; another Commedia of the XIVth Century with chapters by Jacopo Alighieri and Bosone da Gubbio, with beautiful miniatures for every chapter of Inferno; eleven Arabic codes; the De Balneis Puteolanis of the XIIIth Century with Sicilian school miniatures; a book on Danish silver coins of the XIVth Century with exquisite Flemish miniatures; a major part of Meir ben Solomon Abi-Sahula's commentary on Sefer Yetzirah in the author's own handwriting.

The library owns more than 1,100 incunabula, including an edition of the first book printed in Italy: the De Oratore by Cicero, produced in 1465 at Subiaco by Arnold Pannartz and Konrad Sweynheim, German proto-printers. Another book owned by the Angelica came out of that same press: the De civitate Dei by St. Augustine of 1467. Other particularly valuable incunabula owned by the Angelica are the following: the Divinarum istitutionum by Lactantius of 1468; the Epistolae by St. Jerome of 1468; the Commentaria in Evangelistas of 1470; the Storia naturale [Natural History] by Pliny of 1470; a Divina Commedia printed in Florence in 1481 with Landino's commentary and engravings made to Botticelli's design. Included in the works of the sixteenth Century, an edition of Orlando Furioso printed at Ferrara in 1521 and a copy of the Vulgate Bible of 1571 with the autograph corrections of Sixtus V are quite noteworthy.

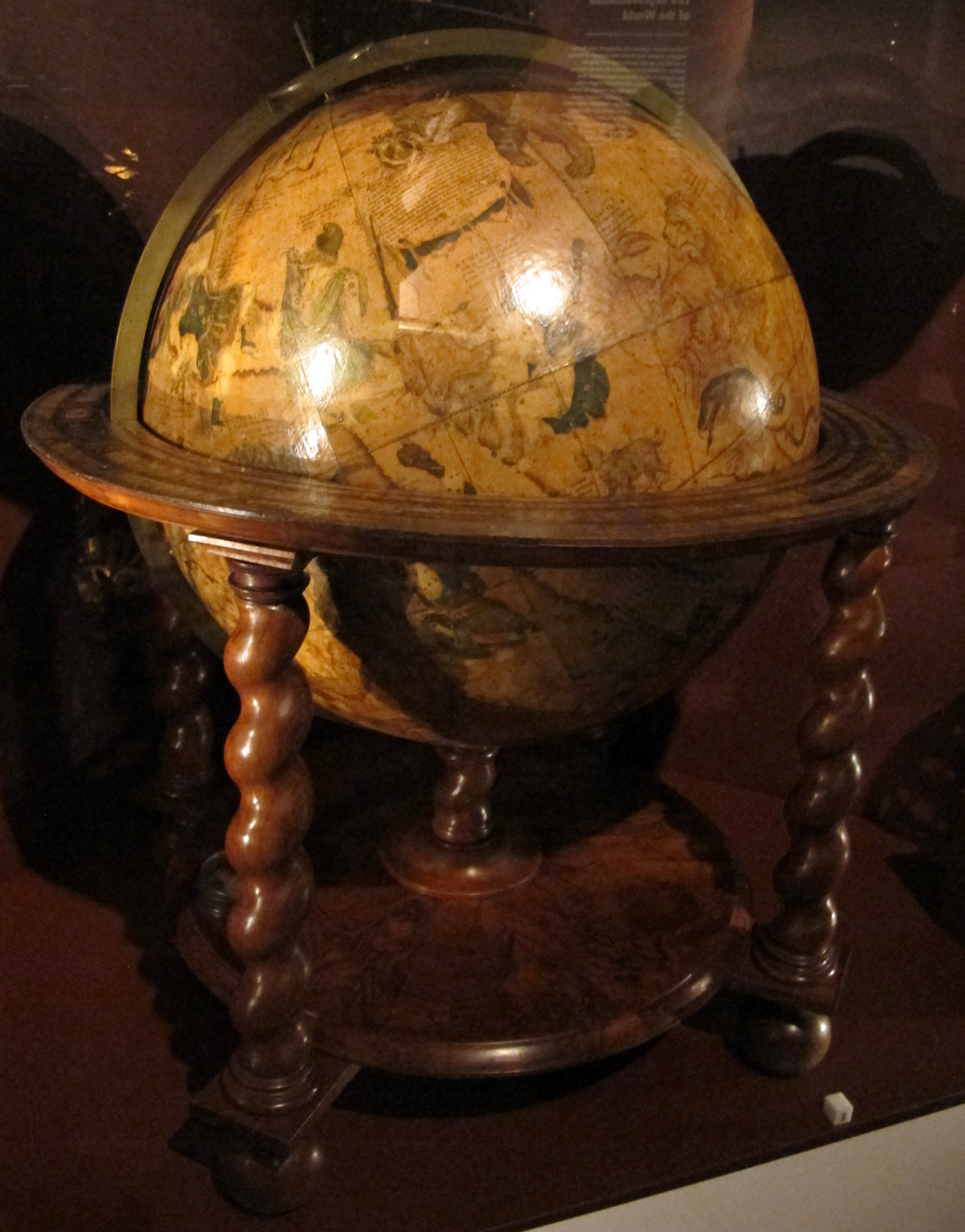
Blaeu's celestial globe

Also numerous are the papers and documents of great historical interest owned by the library: many manuscripts on the Jesuits, on the French domination, which include a diary on the voyage undertaken in France by Pope Pius VII for the coronation of Napoleon, and a very accurate report on the relationships intervening between the Pope and the French from 1808 to the restoration in 1814. Many manuscripts are evidence on the history of the Papal States right up to the unification of Italy: from the conclaves to the insurrections, to the festivities, to international relationships.

The Angelica further owns 460 unbound geographical maps and around 10,000 maps bound in volumes, numerous atlases and the only two known copies of the first edition of Willem Jansz Blaeu's globe (ca. 1598).

Since 1940 the Angelica has also become the seat of the Pontifical Academy of Arcadia which gave it on deposit the historical archives and the library with its wealth of 10,000 volumes comprising hundreds of books, pamphlets, academic writings, periodicals, unique issues, authographs that are a faithful evidence of the background and the development of the life of the academy whose first seeds date back to the meetings held in Rome in the palace of Queen Christina of Sweden.

== Some manuscripts ==
- Codex Angelico Ms. 1474 – Medieval copy of Peter of Eboli's De balneis Puteolanis
- Codex Angelicus – Greek uncial manuscript of the New Testament
- Minuscule manuscripts of New Testament: 178, 179, 846, 847, 848, 853
- Codex Angelico Ms. 10, containing the sole copy of the Liber memorialis of Remiremont

== Bibliography ==
- Saggio dell'intero catalogo di centosei codici greci della Biblioteca Angelica in Roma totalmente descritti ed illustrati da Costantino Maes. Rome: Tipografia della Pace di Filippo Cuggiani. 1894.
- Castelbarco Albani Della Somaglia, M. (1927). "La Biblioteca Angelica e il suo Fondatore". La Bibliofilía. 28 (10/11): 382–393. JSTOR 26208870.
- Di Cesare, Francesca, ed. (1982). Biblioteca Angelica di Roma. Turin: Bottega d'Erasmo.
- Munafò, Paola; Muratore, Nicoletta (1989). La Biblioteca Angelica. Rome: Istituto poligrafico dello stato.
- Serrai, Alfredo (2004). Angelo Rocca fondatore della prima biblioteca pubblica europea. Milan: Sylvestre Bonnard. ISBN 88-86842-95-3.
- Munafò, Paola; Muratore, Nicoletta (2004). Bibliotheca Angelica publicae commoditati dicata. Rome: Istituto poligrafico dello Stato.
- Paesano, Paola, ed. (2006). Per desiderio di scorrere il mondo: libri di viaggio della Biblioteca Angelica, 1330–1835. Rome: Istituto poligrafico e Zecca dello Stato. ISBN 88-240-1213-2.
- Faia, Chiara (2008). «Libri mandati a ligare...» conti e spese della biblioteca Angelica. Uno studio del libro dell'esito (1620-1701). Manziana: Vecchiarelli.
- Sciarra, Elisabetta (2009). "Breve storia del fondo manoscritto della Biblioteca Angelica". La Bibliofilía. 111 (3): 251–282. JSTOR 26198848.
