= Minuscule 355 =

- New Testament manuscript
- Text: Gospels
- Date: 12th century
- Script: Greek
- Now at: Biblioteca Marciana
- Size: 16.5 cm by 12.5 cm
- Type: Byzantine text-type
- Category: V
- Note: marginalia

Minuscule 355 (in the Gregory-Aland numbering), ε 235 (Soden), is a Greek minuscule manuscript of the New Testament, on parchment. Paleographically it has been assigned to the 12th century.

The manuscript has complex contents and some marginalia.

== Description ==
The codex contains a complete text of the four Gospels on 410 parchment leaves (16.5 cm by 12.5 cm), in octavo (8 leaves in quire), with a Commentary of Theophylact. The text is written in one column per page, in 18 lines per page.

The text is divided according to κεφαλαια (chapters), whose numbers are given at the margin, and their τιτλοι (titles of chapters) at the top of the pages. There is also another division according to the smaller Ammonian Sections, with references to the Eusebian Canons.

It contains the Epistula ad Carpianum, the Eusebian tables, tables of the κεφαλαια (tables of contents) before each Gospel, lectionary markings at the margin (added by a later hand), and Synaxarion (probably added by a later hand).

== Text ==
The Greek text of the codex is a representative of the Byzantine text-type. Hermann von Soden classified it to the textual family K^{1}. Aland placed it in Category V. According to the Claremont Profile Method it represents family K^{x} in Luke 1, Luke 10, and Luke 20.

== History ==
The manuscript was added to the list of New Testament manuscripts by Scholz (1794-1852). It was examined by Birch, Burgon. C. R. Gregory saw it in 1886.

The manuscript is currently housed at the Biblioteca Marciana (Gr. Z. 541) in Venice.

== See also ==
- List of New Testament minuscules
- Biblical manuscript
- Textual criticism
- Minuscule 212
