= Minuscule 846 =

- New Testament manuscript
- Text: Gospel of Luke †
- Date: 14th century
- Script: Greek
- Now at: Biblioteca Angelica
- Size: 32.5 cm by 23 cm
- Type: Byzantine text-type
- Category: V
- Note: commentary

Minuscule 846 (in the Gregory-Aland numbering), Ν^{λ29} (von Soden), is a 14th-century Greek minuscule manuscript of the New Testament on parchment. The manuscript has no complex content.

== Description ==
The codex contains the text of the Gospel of Luke (6:32-12:17) on 343 parchment leaves (size 32.5 cm by 23 cm), with a catena. The text is written in one column per page, 31 lines per page.

== Text ==
The Greek text of the codex is a representative of the Byzantine text-type. Kurt Aland the Greek text of the codex placed in Category V. It was not examined by the Claremont Profile Method.

== History ==
C. R. Gregory dated the manuscript to the 14th century. Currently the manuscript is dated by the INTF to the 14th century.

The manuscript was added to the list of New Testament manuscripts by Gregory (846^{e}). Gregory saw it in 1886.

Currently the manuscript is housed at the Biblioteca Angelica (Ms. 100), in Rome.

== See also ==
- List of New Testament minuscules
- Biblical manuscript
- Textual criticism
- Minuscule 847
- Minuscule 853 – similar manuscript
