= Minuscule 853 =

- New Testament manuscript
- Text: Gospel of Luke †
- Date: 15th century
- Script: Greek
- Now at: Biblioteca Angelica
- Size: 33 cm by 22.5 cm
- Type: Byzantine text-type
- Category: V
- Note: —

Minuscule 853 (in the Gregory-Aland numbering), Ν^{λ69} (von Soden), is a 15th-century Greek minuscule manuscript of the New Testament on parchment. The manuscript has no complex content.

== Description ==
The codex contains the text of the Gospel of Luke (6:29-12:10) on 320 parchment leaves (size 33 cm by 22.5 cm), with a catena. The text is written in one column per page, 30 lines per page.

== Text ==
The Greek text of the codex is a representative of the Byzantine text-type. Kurt Aland the Greek text of the codex placed in Category V. It was not examined by the Claremont Profile Method.

== History ==
C. R. Gregory dated the manuscript to the 15th century. Currently, the manuscript is dated by the INTF to the 15th century. 879 was probably rewritten from this manuscript.

The manuscript was added to the list of New Testament manuscripts by Gregory (853^{e}). Gregory saw it in 1886.

Currently the manuscript is housed at the Biblioteca Casanatense (Ms. 715), in Rome.

== See also ==
- List of New Testament minuscules
- Biblical manuscript
- Textual criticism
- Minuscule 846 – similar manuscript
