= Minuscule 112 =

- New Testament manuscript
- Text: Gospels
- Date: 11th century
- Script: Greek
- Now at: Bodleian Library
- Size: 14.5 cm by 11.3 cm
- Type: Byzantine text-type
- Category: V
- Hand: beautifully written
- Note: marginalia

Minuscule 112 (in the Gregory-Aland numbering), ε 146 (Soden), is a Greek minuscule manuscript of the New Testament, on parchment leaves. Palaeographically it has been assigned to the 11th century. The manuscript has complex contents and full marginalia.

== Description ==
The codex contains the text of the four Gospels on 167 parchment leaves (14.5 cm by 11.3 cm). The text is written in one column per page, 33 lines per page. The large initial letters in gold.

The text is divided according to the κεφαλαια (chapters), whose numbers are given at the margin, and their τιτλοι at the top of the pages. There is also another division according to the smaller Ammonian Sections, with references to the Eusebian Canons (in Matthew 1-Mark 2 in the same line). (Note: In the same way arranged codices 192, 198, 212, 267, 507, 583, 584.)

It contains the Epistle to Carpian, the Eusebian tables, tables of the κεφαλαια (tables of contents) are placed before each Gospel, lectionary markings at the margin (for liturgical use), synaxaria, Menologion, subscriptions at the end of each Gospel, and portraits of the Evangelists. According to Scrivener it is "a very beautiful copy".

== Text ==
The Greek text of the codex is a representative of the Byzantine text-type. Aland placed it in Category V.

According to the Claremont Profile Method in represents K^{x} in Luke 1 and Luke 20; in Luke 10 no profile was made. It creates textual cluster 112.

== History ==
The manuscript was examined by Scholz, who collated it partially. C. R. Gregory saw it in 1883.

It is housed at the Bodleian Library (E. D. Clarke 10) at Oxford.

== See also ==
- List of New Testament minuscules
- Biblical manuscript
- Textual criticism
