= Minuscule 117 =

- New Testament manuscript
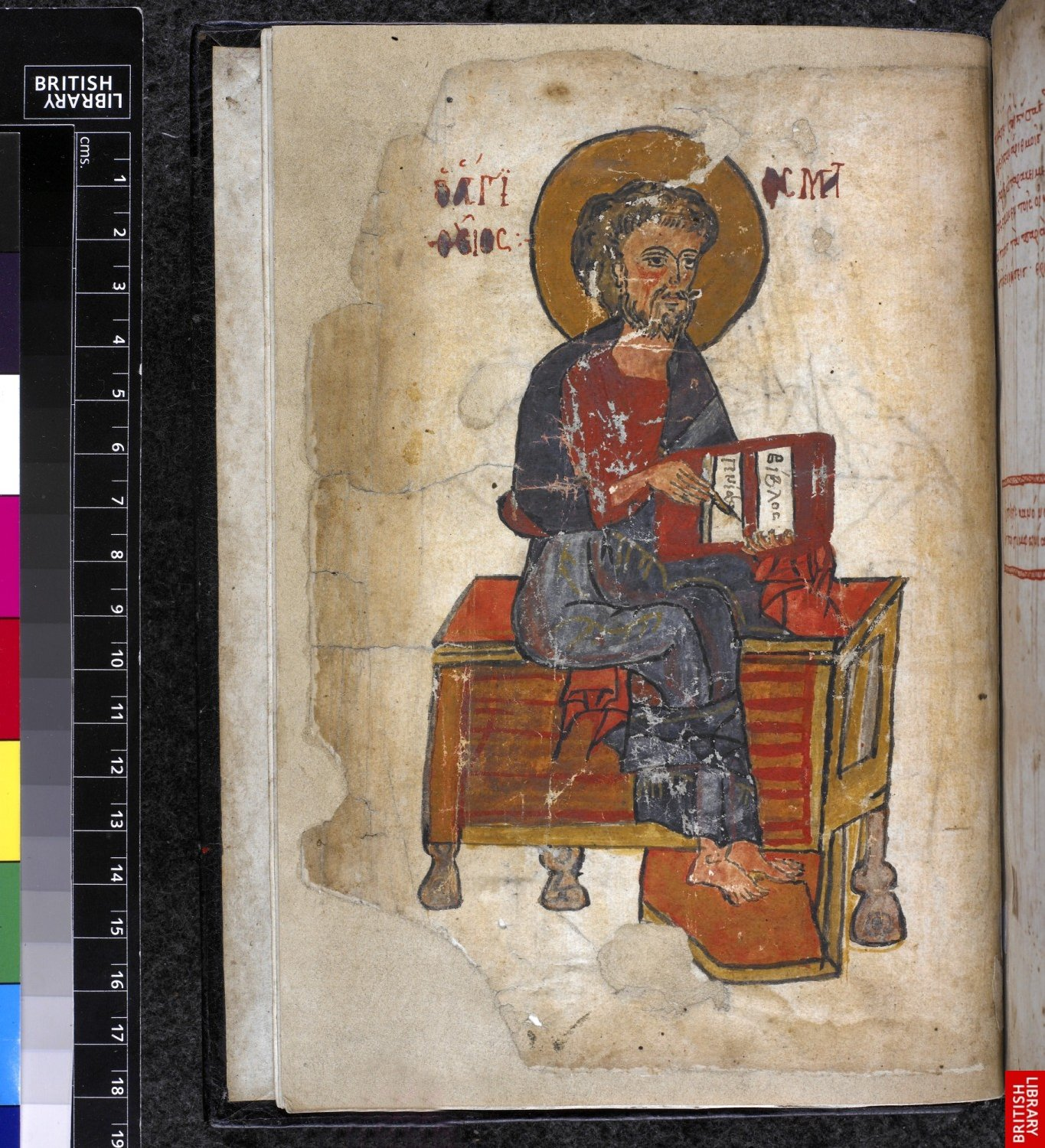
- Portrait of Evangelist Matthew
- Name: Harley MS 5731
- Text: Gospels
- Date: 15th century
- Script: Greek
- Now at: British Library
- Size: 20.5 cm by 14.8 cm
- Type: Byzantine text-type
- Category: none
- Note: marginalia

Minuscule 117 (in the Gregory-Aland numbering), ε 506 (Soden), is a Greek minuscule manuscript of the New Testament, on paper leaves. Palaeographically it has been assigned to the 15th century. It has full marginalia.

== Description ==
The codex contains the text of the four Gospels on 202 paper leaves (size 20.5 cm by 14.8 cm), with lacunae in Matthew 1:1-18; 15:18-39. The text is written in one column per page.

The text is divided according to the κεφαλαια (chapters), whose numbers are given at the margin, and the τιτλοι (titles) at the top of the pages. There is also a division according to the Ammonian Sections (in Mark 241 - 16:20), (no references to the Eusebian Canons).

It contains the Epistula ad Carpianum, the Eusebian Tables, lectionary markings at the margin (for liturgical use), incipits, synaxaria, Menologion, subscriptions at the end Mark and John (as in Codex Sangallensis 48), numbers of στιχοι, and pictures. The initial letters, rubrics, and scholia in red.

== Text ==
The Greek text of the codex is a representative of the Byzantine text-type. Hermann von Soden classified it to the group I^{φb}. Aland did not place it to any Category. According to the Claremont Profile Method it represents the textual family K^{x} in Luke 1 and Luke 20. In Luke 10 no Profile was made.

== History ==
Place of origin of the manuscript is Eastern Mediterranean. It came to England in the first half of the 16th century.

The manuscript once belonged to Richard Bentley. It was examined by Griesbach, Bloomfield, and Angelo Mai. C. R. Gregory saw it in 1883.

It is currently housed at the British Library (Harley MS 5731).

== See also ==
- List of New Testament minuscules
- Biblical manuscript
- Textual criticism
