= Carlo Murena =

Italian architect

Carlo Murena (July 16, 1713–May 7, 1764) was an Italian architect of the late-Baroque period active in Rome, Foligno, Perugia, and other towns in central Italy.

== Life ==
Murena was born in Collalto Sabino to Giuseppe and Dorotea Rolli Murena. The poet and librettist Paolo Rolli was his uncle. He studied at Rome as a pupil of Niccolo Salvi. Around 1737 Cardinal Barberini sent him to train with Luigi Vanvitelli, who was then building the Lazzaretto of Ancona.

== Works ==
Murena worked on a number of Vanvitelli's projects, including the campanile at the Basilica della Santa Casa on Loreto. After Vanvitelli left for Naples in 1751, Murena took over completion of a number of his commissions, including Sant'Agostino, Rome and the Biblioteca Angelica.

Murena was director of the works at a church of Monte Morcino in Perugia for the Olivetan monks. This led to a commission to design the chapel decorations for the abbey church of the monastery of S. Maria in Campis at Foligno. In 1743 he designed for the Olivetans, the new abbey church of S. Croce di Sassovivo near Foligno. He also designed the tabernacle for the Cathedral of Terni. In 1759 he became a member of the Accademia di San Luca. In 1760 he designed for the Franciscan nuns the church of the Holy Trinity at Foligno.

In Rome, Murena constructed the Zampai chapel and its funereal monuments, all found in Sant'Antonio dei Portoghesi.

Murena's work has been discussed in many books on Baroque architecture in Italy.

== Sources ==
- Milizia, Francesco (1826). Translated by Mrs. Edward Cresy (ed.). The lives of celebrated architects, ancient and modern.Volume 1. J. Taylor Architectural Library, High Holborn, London. p. 333.
- Pompeii, Sabina Carbonara. At the twilight of the Baroque, Viella, 2008 ISBN 9788883342929
