= Minuscule 878 =

- New Testament manuscript
- Name: Cod. Ottobonianus gr. 37
- Text: Gospels
- Date: 12th century
- Script: Greek
- Now at: Vatican Library
- Size: 34.3 cm by 21.8 cm
- Type: Byzantine
- Category: none
- Note: marginalia

Minuscule 878 (in the Gregory-Aland numbering), Θ^{ε200} (von Soden), is a 12th-century Greek minuscule manuscript of the New Testament on parchment. It has complex contents.

Formerly it was known as Codex Altemprianus.

== Description ==
The codex contains the text of the four Gospels on 248 parchment leaves (size 34.3 cm by 21.8 cm), with a commentary. The text is written in one column per page, 46 lines per page.

The text is divided according to the κεφαλαια (chapters), whose numbers are given at the margin, and their τιτλοι (titles of chapters) at the top of the pages. There is also a division according to the Ammonian Sections, with references to the Eusebian Canons.

It contains the Eusebian Canon tables, tables of κεφαλαια (tables of contents) before each Gospel, lectionary markings for liturgical reading, and number of verses at the end of each Gospel. It contains a commentary of Theophylact. According to Hermann von Soden it is an ornamented manuscript. It has not the Epistula ad Carpianum.

== Text ==
The Greek text of the codex Kurt Aland did not place it in any Category. It was not examined by the Claremont Profile Method.

== History ==
According to F. H. A. Scrivener and C. R. Gregory it was written in the 12th century. Currently the manuscript is dated by the INTF to the 12th century.

The manuscript was added to the list of New Testament manuscripts by Scrivener (703^{e}), Gregory (878^{e}). Gregory saw it in 1886.

It was examined and described by Ernesto Feron and Fabiano Battaglini (like minuscule 386 and 880).

Currently the manuscript is housed at the Vatican Library (Ottob. gr. 37), in Rome.

== See also ==
- List of New Testament minuscules (1–1000)
- Biblical manuscript
- Textual criticism
- Minuscule 877
