= Minuscule 116 =

- New Testament manuscript
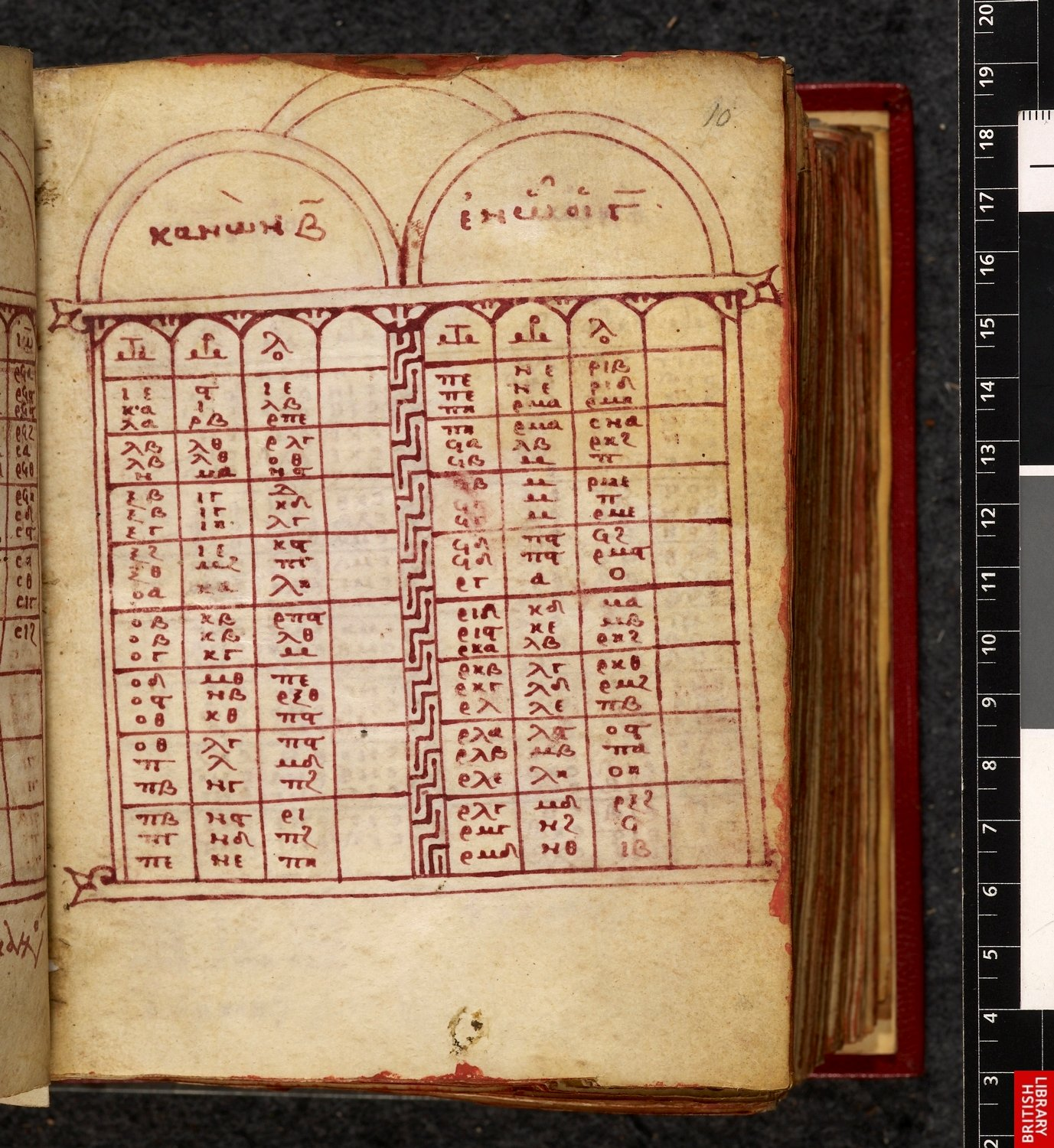
- Decorated Canon table on folio 10
- Name: Harley MS 5567
- Sign: Eusebian tables
- Text: Gospels
- Date: 12th century
- Script: Greek
- Now at: British Library
- Size: 16.6 cm by 13.1 cm
- Type: Byzantine text-type
- Note: marginalia

Minuscule 116 (in the Gregory-Aland numbering), ε 249 (Soden), or "Codex Harleianus 5567" is a Greek minuscule manuscript of the New Testament, on parchment leaves. Palaeographically it has been assigned to the 12th century. It has complex contents with some marginalia.

== Description ==
The codex contains a complete text of the four Gospels on 300 parchment leaves (size 16.6 cm by 13.1 cm), 4 unfoliated paper leaves at the beginning, and 3 at the end. The text is written in one column per page, in 23 lines per page. The large initial letters are written in gold and colours. The headpieces with geometric and foliate decoration in gold and colours (folios 15r, 93r, 145r, 229r). The end of John is written in cruciform.

The text is divided according to the κεφαλαια (chapters), whose numbers are given at the margin, and their τιτλοι (titles of chapters) at the top of the pages. There is also another division according to the smaller Ammonian Sections (in Mark 241 sections – the last numbered section ends in 16:20). It has no references to the Eusebian Canons.

It contains the Eusebian Canon tables with geometric decorations in gold and colour (on folios 9–13), tables of the κεφαλαια (tables of contents) before each Gospel, αναγνωσεις (lessons), numbers of στιχοι, and synaxaria. The Menologion was added in the 13th century (folios 1–8, 291-296v). The initial letters in colours. Scholia are written in red or purple.

There is an inscription on folio 1 'Bernard Mould Smyrna 1724'.

== Text ==
The Greek text of the codex is a representative of the Byzantine text-type. Kurt Aland placed it in Category V.

According to the Claremont Profile Method it represents mixed Byzantine text (mixture of Byzantine textual families) in Luke 1 and Luke 10. In Luke 20 it belongs to the textual cluster 1167.

== History ==
The manuscript is dated to the 12th century. On folio 92 verso it has inscription "Nikolaos Kataphaga of Katharak". According to the inscriptions on folio 92 verso and folio 141 verso it belonged to Athanasios, hieromonk at St John Prodromos.

In 1649 it belonged to Athananius, a Greek monk, in 1724 to Bernard Mould (b. c. 1683; d. 1744), English chaplain at Smyrna, who owned it in 1724 (as minuscule 115). It was sold to Edward Harley on 28 July 1725. In 1753, it was purchased by the British government along with the collections for the British Museum.

It was examined by Griesbach, Bloomfield, Henri Omont, and Cyril Ernest Wright. C. R. Gregory saw it in 1883.

It was rebound in 1967.

It is currently housed at the British Library (Harley MS 5567).

== See also ==
- List of New Testament minuscules
- Biblical manuscript
- Textual criticism
