= Minuscule 851 =

- New Testament manuscript
- Text: Gospels
- Date: 14th-century
- Script: Greek
- Now at: ?
- Size: 26 cm by 18.5 cm
- Type: Byzantine / mixed
- Category: none
- Note: full marginalia

Minuscule 851 (in the Gregory-Aland numbering), ε408 (von Soden), is a 14th-century Greek minuscule manuscript of the New Testament on parchment.

== Description ==
The codex contains the text of the four Gospels on 260 parchment leaves (size 26 cm by 18.5 cm). The text is written in two columns per page, 19-22 lines per page.

The text is divided according to the κεφαλαια (chapters), whose numbers are given at the margin, and their τιτλοι (titles) at the top of the pages. There is another division according to the smaller Ammonian Sections (in Mark 241 Sections, the last in 16:20), without references to the Eusebian Canons.

It contains the tables of the κεφαλαια (tables of contents) before each Gospel, lectionary markings at the margin, incipits, pictures, and verses to John. The Synaxarion and Menologion – liturgical books – were added in the 16th century.

== Text ==
The Greek text of the codex is a representative of the Byzantine text-type with a mixture of other text-types. Kurt Aland the Greek text of the codex did not place in any Category.

According to the Claremont Profile Method it has a mixture of the text-types in Luke 1 and Luke 20. In Luke 10 it has a mixture of the Byzantine text-types. It has some relationship to the group 7 in Luke 20.

== History ==
C. R. Gregory dated the manuscript to the 12th century. Currently the manuscript is dated by the INTF to the 14th century.

The manuscript was written by Basilius.

The manuscript was added to the list of New Testament manuscripts by Gregory (851^{e}). C. R. Gregory saw it in 1886.

The manuscript once belonged to Borgianus. It was housed in the Vatican Library. Then it was housed at the Antiquariat Quaritch, in London. The actual owner of the codex is unknown.

== See also ==
- List of New Testament minuscules
- Biblical manuscript
- Textual criticism
