= Minuscule 847 =

- New Testament manuscript
- Text: Matthew, Mark
- Date: 12th century
- Script: Greek
- Now at: Biblioteca Angelica
- Size: 29.5 cm by 22 cm
- Type: Byzantine text-type
- Category: none
- Note: commentary

Minuscule 847 (in the Gregory-Aland numbering) is a 12th-century Greek minuscule manuscript of the New Testament on parchment. The manuscript has no complex content.

== Description ==
The codex contains the text of the Gospel of Matthew and Gospel of Mark on 280 parchment leaves (size 29.5 cm by 22 cm), with a catena. The text is written in one column per page, 33 lines per page. The biblical text is surrounded by a catena.

It contains the tables of the κεφαλαια (tables of contents) before each Gospel, Synaxarion, subscriptions at the end of the Gospels, and numbers of στιχοι.

== Text ==
The Greek text of the codex is a representative of the Byzantine text-type. Kurt Aland the Greek text of the codex did not place in any Category.

== History ==
F. H. A. Scrivener and C. R. Gregory dated the manuscript to the 12th century. Other palaeographers dated it to the 14th century. Currently the manuscript is dated by the INTF to the 12th century.

The manuscript once belonged to Cardinal Domenico Passionei.

The manuscript was added to the list of New Testament manuscripts by Scrivener (723^{e}) and Gregory (847^{e}). Gregory saw it in 1886.

Currently the manuscript is housed at the Biblioteca Angelica (Ms. 36), in Rome.

== See also ==
- List of New Testament minuscules
- Biblical manuscript
- Textual criticism
- Minuscule 846
