= Minuscule 160 =

- New Testament manuscript
- Name: Codex Barberinianus 9
- Text: Gospels
- Date: 1123
- Script: Greek
- Now at: Vatican Library
- Size: 22.6 cm by 18 cm
- Type: Family 1424
- Category: none
- Note: marginalia

Minuscule 160 (in the Gregory-Aland numbering), ε 213 (Soden), is a Greek minuscule manuscript of the New Testament, on parchment. It is dated by its colophon to the year 1123. it has marginalia.

== Description ==
The codex contains a complete text of the four Gospels on 216 thick parchment leaves (size 22.6 cm by 18 cm). The text is written in one column per page, in 23 lines per page (size of column 15.7 by 10.7 cm), in brown ink, the capital letters in red. It uses "ι adscriptum".

The text is divided according to the κεφαλαια (chapters), whose numbers are given at the margin, and the τιτλοι (titles of chapters) at the top of the pages. There is also a division according to the Ammonian Sections, (no references to the Eusebian Canons).

The tables of the κεφαλαια (tables of contents) are placed before each Gospel, lectionary markings at the margin for liturgical use, synaxaria, Menologion, and subscriptions at the end of each Gospel.

== Text ==
Kurt Aland the Greek text of the codex did not place it in any Category. It is classified to the textual Family 1424. According to the Claremont Profile Method it has mixed text in Luke 1. In Luke 10 and Luke 20 it represents textual family K^{x}.

== History ==
The manuscript was housed at the Barberini Palace, founded by the Cardinal, Francis II.

It was examined by Birch (about 1782) and Scholz (1794–1852). C. R. Gregory saw the manuscript in 1886.

It is currently housed at the Vatican Library (Barb. gr. 445), at Rome.

== See also ==
- List of New Testament minuscules
- Biblical manuscript
- Textual criticism
