= Minuscule 7 =

Greek minuscule manuscript of the New Testament

- New Testament manuscript
- Text: Gospels
- Date: 12th century
- Script: Greek
- Now at: National Library of France
- Size: 20.6 cm by 16 cm
- Type: Byzantine text-type/mixed
- Category: none
- Note: Family 1424

Minuscule 7 is a Greek minuscule manuscript of the New Testament, made of parchment. It is designated by the siglum 7 in the Gregory-Aland numbering of New Testament manuscripts, and ε 287 in the von Soden numbering of New Testament manuscripts. Using the study of comparative writing styles (palaeography), it has been assigned to the 12th century.

== Description ==
The manuscript is a codex (precursor to the modern book), containing the complete text of the four Gospels on 186 parchment leaves (sized 20.6 cm by 16 cm). The text is written in one column per page, 29 lines per page. The capital letters are written in colour, the initial letters are written in red.

The text is divided according to the chapters (known as κεφαλαια / kephalaia), whose numbers are given at the margin, with the chapter titles (known as τιτλοι / titloi) at the top of the pages. There is also a division according to the smaller Ammonian Sections (241 sections in the Gospel of Mark), with references to the Eusebian Canons.

It contains Gospel introductions (known as prolegomena), a synaxaria (list of weekly readings in the Church's calendar, the Epistle to Carpian, Eusebian Canon tables at the beginning, pictures, the Menologion (list of Saint Feast days), and lectionary markings in the margin.

== Text ==
According to biblical scholar and textual critic Constantin von Tischendorf, the text of the manuscript is considered a representative of the Byzantine text-type, but with some Alexandrian readings. Biblical scholar Kurt Aland did not place it in any Category of his New Testament manuscript classification system.

According to the Claremont Profile Method (a specific analysis of textual data), it forms a textual cluster along with Minuscule 267, 1651, and 1654. The cluster stands close to the textual family K^{x}. It belongs to the textual Family 1424.

== History ==
The earliest history of the manuscript is unknown. It was examined by biblical scholars Johann J. Wetstein and Johann M. A. Scholz. Scholz examined only Mark 1-6 and John 3-8. Wettstein gave the number 7 to it.

According to biblical scholar Frederick H. A. Scrivener, it seems to be Stephens' ς'. It was examined and described by Paulin Martin. Biblical scholar Caspar René Gregory saw the manuscript in 1885.

The manuscript is currently dated by the INTF to the 12th century. It is presently located at the National Library of France (shelf number Gr. 71) in Paris.

== See also ==
- Minuscule 8
- Minuscule 6
- List of New Testament minuscules
- Textus Receptus
- Textual criticism
- Minuscule 851 (Gregory-Aland) – some textual relationship in Luke 20
