= Minuscule 349 =

- New Testament manuscript
- Text: Gospels
- Date: 1322
- Script: Greek
- Now at: Biblioteca Ambrosiana
- Cite: Scholz, Biblisch-kritische Reise (1823)
- Size: 22.6 cm by 15 cm
- Category: none
- Note: Family 1424

Minuscule 349 (in the Gregory-Aland numbering), ε 413 (Soden), is a Greek minuscule manuscript of the New Testament, on paper. It is dated by a colophon to the year 1322. It has marginalia.

== Description ==
The codex contains a complete text of the four Gospels on 399 paper leaves (22.6 cm by 15 cm). The text is written in one column per page, in 14-25 lines per page.

The text is divided according to the κεφαλαια (chapters), whose numbers are given at the margin, with their τιτλοι (titles of chapters) at the top of the pages. There is also a division according to the smaller Ammonian Sections (in Mark 234 Sections, the last in 16:9), without references to the Eusebian Canons.

It contains the Synaxarion, Menologion, subscriptions at the end of each Gospel, Verses (later hand), and pictures.

== Text ==
The Greek text of the codex is a representative of the Byzantine text-type. It is a member of the textual family 1424. Aland did not place it in any Category. According to the Claremont Profile Method it creates textual cluster 349 and textual pair with minuscule 2388.

== History ==
The manuscript was bought in Corfu. It was examined by Scholz and Burgon. It was added to the list of New Testament manuscripts by Scholz (1794-1852). C. R. Gregory saw it in 1868.

The manuscript is currently housed at the Biblioteca Ambrosiana (F. 61 sup.) in Milan.

== See also ==
- List of New Testament minuscules
- Biblical manuscript
- Textual criticism
