= Minuscule 185 =

- New Testament manuscript
- Text: Gospels
- Date: 14th century
- Script: Greek
- Now at: Laurentian Library
- Size: 34.5 cm by 16.9 cm
- Type: Byzantine text-type
- Category: V
- Note: member of Family 1424 marginalia

Minuscule 185 (in the Gregory-Aland numbering), ε 410 (Soden), is a Greek minuscule manuscript of the New Testament, on parchment. Paleographically it has been assigned to the 14th century. It has complex contents, with full marginalia.

== Description ==
The codex contains a complete text of the four Gospels on 341 parchment leaves (size 34.5 cm by 16.9 cm). The text is written in one column per page, in 21 lines per page (size of column 14.8 by 8.5 cm), in black ink, the capital letters in red.

The text is divided according to the κεφαλαια (chapters), whose numbers are given at the margin, and the τιτλοι (titles of chapters) at the top of the pages. There is also a division according to the Ammonian Sections (in Mark 241 Sections – the last in 16:20, though in subscriptions 236 Sections). There is no references to the Eusebian Canons.

It contains Prolegomena, tables of the κεφαλαια (tables of contents) before each Gospel, lectionary markings at the margin (for liturgical use), incipits, subscriptions at the end of each Gospel, with numbers of στιχοι, (not synaxaria).

== Text ==
The Greek text of the codex is a representative of the Byzantine text-type. Aland placed it in Category V. It is classified to the textual Family 1424. According to the Claremont Profile Method it belongs to the textual cluster 1531.

== History ==
The manuscript is dated by the INTF to the 14th century. It was written by one Basil.

It was examined by Birch, Scholz, and Burgon. C. R. Gregory saw it in 1886.

It is currently housed at the Laurentian Library (Plutei. VI. 16), at Florence.

== See also ==
- List of New Testament minuscules
- Biblical manuscript
- Textual criticism
