= Minuscule 267 =

Greek manuscript of the New Testament

- New Testament manuscript
- Text: Gospels
- Date: 12th century
- Script: Greek
- Now at: National Library of France
- Size: 20.5 cm by 15.5 cm
- Type: Byzantine text-type
- Category: V
- Note: member of Family 1424

Minuscule 267 (in the Gregory-Aland numbering), ε 1289 (Soden), is a Greek minuscule manuscript of the New Testament, on parchment. Paleographically it has been assigned to the 12th century. It has marginalia.

== Description ==
The codex contains the text of the four Gospels on 396 parchment leaves (20.5 cm by 15.5 cm), with lacunae (Matthew 1:1-8; Mark 1:1-7; Luke 1:1-8; Luke 24:50-John 1:12). The text is written in one column per page, in 20 lines per page.

The text is divided according to the Ammonian Sections (Matthew 343, Mark 241 – the last section in 16:9, Luke 339, John 231), whose numbers are given at the margin. There are also references to the Eusebian Canons (in Matthew and Mark in the same line as Ammonian Sections – see codex 112). (Note: In the same way arranged codices 192, 198, 212, 507, 583, 584.)

It contains Prolegomena, tables of the κεφαλαια (tables of contents) before each Gospel, lectionary markings at the margin, incipits, αναγνωσεις (Matthew 116; Mark 71, Luke 114, John 67), subscriptions at the end of each Gospel, and numbers of στιχοι.

== Text ==
The Greek text of the codex is a representative of the Byzantine text-type. Aland placed it in Category V.

According to the Claremont Profile Method it creates textual cluster along with the manuscripts 7, 1651, and 1654. The cluster stands close to the textual family K^{x}.

It belongs to the textual family 1424.

== History ==
The manuscript once belonged to Arsenikos, a monk. In 1605 (or 1606) it was presented to Nicodemus. The manuscripts was added to the list of New Testament manuscripts by Scholz (1794-1852). It was examined and described by Paulin Martin. C. R. Gregory saw the manuscript in 1885.

The manuscript is currently housed at the Bibliothèque nationale de France (Gr. 69) at Paris.

== See also ==
- List of New Testament minuscules
- Biblical manuscript
- Textual criticism
