= Minuscule 827 =

- New Testament manuscript
- Text: Gospels †
- Date: 13th century
- Script: Greek
- Now at: Biblioteca della Badia
- Size: 21 cm by 15.5 cm
- Type: Byzantine text-type
- Category: none
- Note: Family 1424

Minuscule 827 (in the Gregory-Aland numbering), ε309 (von Soden), is a 13th-century Greek minuscule manuscript of the New Testament on parchment.

== Description ==
The codex contains the text of the four Gospels, on 225 parchment leaves (size 21 cm by 15.5 cm), with one lacuna at the end. The text is written in one column per page, 24 lines per page. The text of John 19:21–21:25 was supplied by a later hand.

The text is divided according to the κεφαλαια (chapters), and according to the smaller Ammonian Sections (in Mark 234 sections, the last numbered section in 16:12). The numerals of the κεφαλαια are given at the left margin, and their τιτλοι (titles) at the top of the pages. The Ammonian Sections are given without a references to the Eusebian Canons (written under Ammonian Sections).

It contains subscriptions at the end of each Gospel and versification. There are blank spaces for pictures.

== Text ==
The Greek text of the codex is a representative of the Byzantine text-type. Hermann von Soden classified it to the textual family I^{φb}. Aland did not place it in any Category. According to Aland it belongs to the textual family 1424.

According to the Claremont Profile Method it represents textual cluster 827 in Luke 1, Luke 10, and Luke 20. It is a perfect member of the family. The cluster has following profile:

Luke 1: (4), 5, (6), 9, 28, 33, 34, (36), 37, 53.
Luke 10: 15, 19, 48, 51, 55, 57, 58, 62.
Luke 20: 1, (9), 21, 33, 42, 43, 48, 55, 65, 74.

The cluster 827 consisting of manuscripts 827, 1050, 1446, 1457, 1593, and 2766. Minuscule 827 is the lead manuscript of the cluster.

It lacks the text of the Pericope Adulterae (John 7:53-8:11).

== History ==
Gregory dated the manuscript to the 13th century, other palaeographers dated it to the 11th century. Currently the manuscript is dated by the INTF to the 13th century.

The manuscript was examined and described by Antonio Rocci in 1882. The manuscript was collated by F. G. Carver in 1958.

It was added to the list of New Testament manuscripts by Scrivener (625) and Gregory (827^{e}). Gregory saw it in 1886.

Currently the manuscript is housed at the Biblioteca della Badia (A' α. 4), in Grottaferrata.

== See also ==
- List of New Testament minuscules
- Biblical manuscript
- Textual criticism
- Minuscule 825
