= Domenico Silvio Passionei =

Italian Catholic cardinal and nuncio (1682–1761)

His Eminence Domenico Silvio Passionei
- Cardinal-Priest of San Bernardo alle Terme
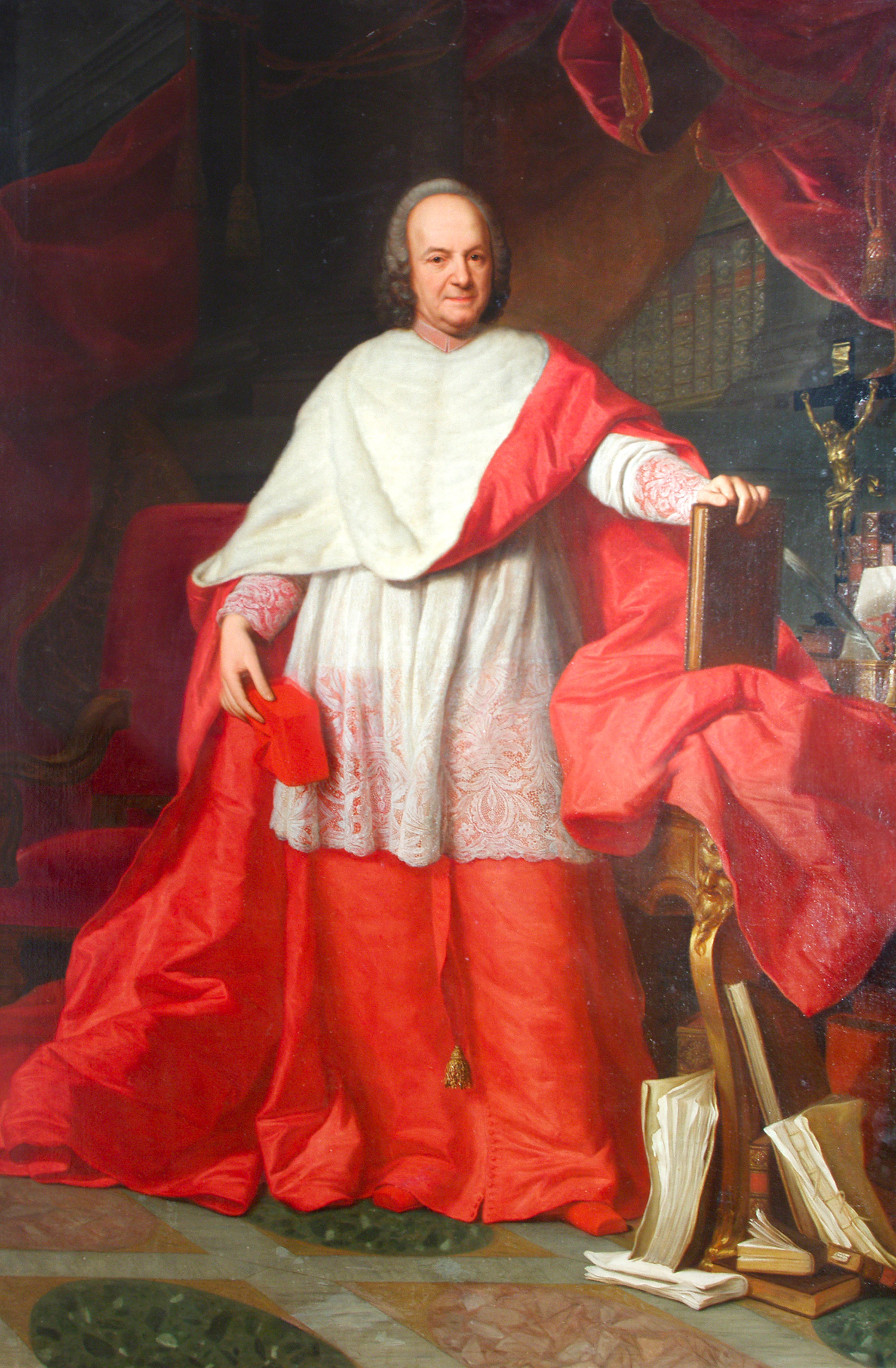
- Portrait by Domenico Duprà, 18th century
- Church: Catholic Church
- Appointed: 23 July 1738
- Term ended: 5 July 1761
- Predecessor: Henri-Pons de Thiard
- Successor: Ignazío Michele Crivelli
- Previous posts: Apostolic Nuncio to Switzerland (1721–1730); Apostolic Nuncio to Austria (1730–1738)

Orders
- Ordination: 1706
- Consecration: 25 July 1721 by Fabrizio Paolucci
- Created cardinal: 23 June 1738 by Pope Clement XII
- Rank: Cardinal-Priest

Personal details
- Born: 2 December 1682 Fossombrone, Italy
- Died: 5 July 1761 (aged 78) Frascati, Italy

Domenico Silvio Passionei (2 December 1682 – 5 July 1761) was an Italian Cardinal of the Roman Catholic Church.

== Biography ==
Domenico Silvio Passionei was born in Fossombrone near Urbino, Marche, the second of the two children of Count Benedetto Passionei and Virginia Sabatelli. At the age of thirteen, he went to Rome in 1695, where he studied philosophy at the Collegio Clementino, an elite school for young noblemen. He studied law at the university La Sapienza. Already in these early years he corresponded with scholars throughout Europe, including Protestants and Jansenists.

In 1706, he was sent to Paris, where he stayed for two years as secretary to his relative, Cardinal Filippo Antonio Gualterio. Later he traveled through the Netherlands, where he participated as official representative of the Holy See at the peace conferences of The Hague (1708) and Utrecht (1712). However, he temporarily retired from 1717 (after his father's death) to his estate in Fossombrone.

While at the Collegio Clementino, Passionei studied music. An enthusiastic amateur musician and composer, during his temporary retirement, Passoinei composed a set of twelve cello sonatas, which he published in 1718.

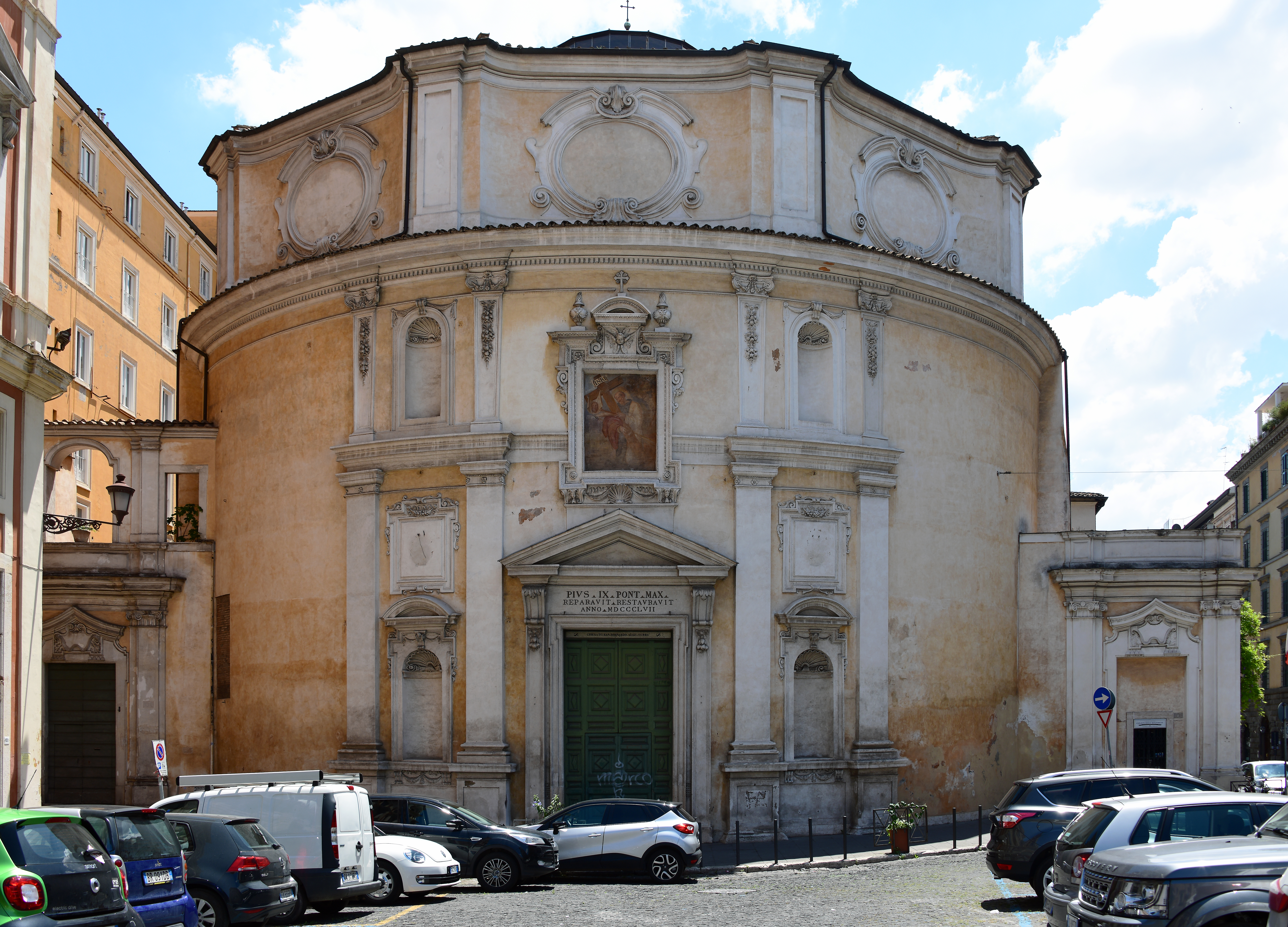
Chiesa di San Bernardo alle Terme

Under the new Pope Innocent XIII, he was named Nuncio in Lucerne, Switzerland, and also made titulary archbishop of Ephesus. From 1730 to 1738, he was Nuncio in Vienna, where he blessed the marriage of Princess Maria Theresa. In 1738, he was created Cardinal Priest of San Bernardo alle Terme, and three years later, he became pro-librarian of the Vatican Library to Cardinal Angelo Maria Quirini, whom he would succeed as librarian in 1755. He was also a corresponding member of Societas eruditorum incognitorum in terris Austriacis.

As Cardinal priest of San Bernardo alle Terme, Passionei had an apartment built on the second floor of the monastery. Intended for use during annual spiritual devotions, it was also used to entertain friends and house a collection of books and impressive portrait prints.

Passionei was decidedly anti-Jesuit, opposing the beatification of the Jesuit Cardinal Bellarmine in 1754. Other than that, he was a proponent of a liberal Catholicism and considered a protector of Jansenists, and defended authors like Montesquieu and Helvétius in Index trials. He was also a manuscript collector, minuscule 847 and minuscule 848 were his manuscripts.

Passionei retired to a Camaldolese monastery near Frascati where he died on July 5, 1761, from complications of a stroke.
