= Minuscule 179 =

- New Testament manuscript
- Text: Gospels †
- Date: 12th century
- Script: Greek
- Now at: Biblioteca Angelica
- Size: 19.5 cm by 16.5 cm
- Type: mixed
- Note: member of Family 1424 marginalia

Minuscule 179 is a Greek minuscule manuscript of the New Testament, written on parchment. It is designated by the siglum 179 in the Gregory-Aland numbering of New Testament manuscripts, and ε 211 in the von Soden numbering of New Testament manuscripts. Using the study of comparative writing styles (palaeography), it has been assigned to the 12th century. It has marginal notes.

== Description ==
The manuscript is a codex (precursor to the modern book format), containing an almost complete text of the four Gospels, written on 249 thick parchment leaves (sized 19.5 cm by 16.5 cm), with some missing sections. The text is written in one column per page, 21-23 lines per page, in dark-brown ink. Capital letters are written in red ink.

The last five leaves (214–218) and two others (23, 30) are replacement ones made of paper, and were added sometime during the 15th or 16th century.

The text is divided according to the chapters (known as κεφαλαια / kephalaia), whose numbers are given in the margin, and their titles (τιτλοι titloi) written at the top of the pages. There is also a division according to the Ammonian Sections, with references to the Eusebian Canons written below the Ammonian Section numbers.

It contains the Eusebian Canon tables at the beginning, tables of contents (also known as κεφαλαια) before each Gospel, and lectionary markings in the margin for liturgical use. A Synaxarion (list of weekly readings) and Menologion (list of Saint's days) were added in the 15th or 16th century on paper.

== Text ==
The Greek text of the manuscript is considered to be a representative of the Byzantine text-type, but with some non-majority readings. Biblical scholar Kurt Aland did not place it in any Category of his New Testament manuscript classification system.

It is classified to the textual Family 1424. According to the Claremont Profile Method (a specific analysis of textual data), it represents textual family K^{x} in Luke 10 and Luke 20. In Luke 1 it has a mixed text.

== History ==
It was examined by biblical scholars Giuseppe Bianchini, Andreas Birch (about 1782), and Johann M. A. Scholz. Biblical scholar Caspar René Gregory saw it in 1886.

It is currently dated by the INTF to the 12th century. It is presently housed at the Angelica Library (shelf number Gr. 11), in Rome.

== See also ==
- Minuscule 180
- Minuscule 178
- Minuscule 1424
- List of New Testament minuscules
- Biblical manuscript
- Textual criticism
