= Minuscule 659 =

- New Testament manuscript
- Text: Gospels
- Date: 12th century
- Script: Greek
- Now at: Jagiellonian Library
- Size: 20.8 cm by 16 cm
- Type: ?
- Category: none

Minuscule 659 (in the Gregory-Aland numbering), ε 1216 (von Soden), is a Greek minuscule manuscript of the New Testament, on parchment. Palaeographically it has been assigned to the 12th century. The manuscript has complex contents. Scrivener labelled it by 637^{e}.

== Description ==
The codex contains the complete text of the four Gospels, on 293 parchment leaves (size 20.8 cm by 16 cm). The text is written in one column per page, 20 lines per page.

It contains Prolegomena to the Gospels and the lists of the κεφαλαια (tables of contents) before each Gospel. The text is divided according to the Ammonian Sections (in Mark 241 sections - 16:20), with a references to the Eusebian Canons. It contains lectionary markings at the margin, noticed proper lessons for feasts and weekdays, subscriptions (υπογραφαι) at the end of each Gospel, and pictures of Evangelists are placed before every Gospel.

== Text ==
Kurt Aland did not examine the Greek text of the codex by using his method of a thousand readings; as a result it is still not placed in any of Aland's Categories.

The text of the manuscript was not examined by using the Claremont Profile Method, in result its textual character is still not determined.

== History ==
Scrivener and Gregory dated the manuscript to the 12th century. Currently the manuscript is dated by the INTF to the 12th century.

The manuscript was written by one Hilarion. It was brought from the East to Berlin. Gregory saw the manuscript in 1887. It was examined and described by Kirsopp Lake and Silva New. The manuscript was housed in Berlin in the Preußische Königliche Bibliothek (then Prussian State Library, actually Berlin State Library) with the shelf-number Gr. quarto 55.

At the end of 1943 the year saw increased frequency of the bombing of Berlin. The Prussian State Library sent many collections out of Berlin to be sheltered in Silesia for safekeeping. As the result of postwar border changes some of these collections were found in Poland (among them minuscule 659). They were moved to the Jagiellonian University Library.

Currently the manuscript is housed at the Biblioteka Jagiellońska (Fonds der Berliner Handschriften, Graec. quarto 55), in Kraków.

== See also ==
- List of New Testament minuscules
- Biblical manuscript
- Textual criticism
