= Minuscule 212 =

- New Testament manuscript
- Text: Gospels †
- Date: 11th century
- Script: Greek
- Now at: Biblioteca Marciana
- Size: 17.5 cm by 13 cm
- Type: Byzantine
- Category: V
- Hand: beautifully written
- Note: marginalia

Minuscule 212 (in the Gregory-Aland numbering), ε 128 (Soden), is a Greek minuscule manuscript of the New Testament, on parchment. Palaeographically it has been assigned to the 11th century. It has marginalia.

== Description ==
The codex contains almost complete text of the four Gospels, with some lacunae, on 273 parchment leaves (size 17.5 cm by 13 cm), in octavo (3 leaves in quires). The leaves 39-52, 190-201, 256-273 were supplied by a later hand, probably from the 15th century.

The text is written in one column per page, 23 lines per page. The manuscript is beautifully written. The first page in gold, with pictures, and most elaborate illuminations.

The text is divided according to the κεφαλαια (chapters), whose numbers are given at the margin, and their τιτλοι (titles of chapters) at the top of the pages. There is also another division according to the smaller Ammonian Sections (in Mark 241), originally without references to the Eusebian Canons. The references to the Eusebian Canons were added by a later hand (in the same line as Ammonian Section numbers - see Minuscule 112).

The manuscript contains the Epistula ad Carpianum, Eusebian Canon tables, lectionary markings at the margin for liturgical reading, and beautiful pictures.

== Text ==
The Greek text of the codex is a representative of the Byzantine text-type. Hermann von Soden classified it to the textual family K^{x}. Aland placed it in Category V.

According to the Claremont Profile Method it represents textual family K^{x} in Luke 10 and Luke 20. In Luke 1 it has mixture of the Byzantine text-families.

The text of the Pericope Adulterae (John 7:53-8:11) is marked by an asterisk (※).

== History ==
The manuscript was examined by Birch and Burgon. C. R. Gregory saw the manuscript in 1886.

It is currently housed at the Biblioteca Marciana (Gr. Z 540), at Venice.

== See also ==
- List of New Testament minuscules
- Biblical manuscript
- Textual criticism
- Minuscule 355
