= Epistula ad Carpianum =

4th-century literary work

The Epistula ad Carpianum ("Letter to Carpian") or Letter of Eusebius is the title traditionally given to a letter from Eusebius of Caesarea to a Christian named Carpianus. In this letter, Eusebius explains his ingenious system of gospel harmony, the Eusebian Canons (tables) that divide the four canonical gospels, and describes their purpose, ten in number.

Eusebius explains that Ammonius the Alexandrian had made a system in which he placed sections of the gospels of Mark, Luke and John next to their parallel sections in Matthew. As this disrupted the normal text order of the gospels of Mark, Luke and John, Eusebius used a system in which he placed the references to the parallel texts in ten tables or 'canons'. By using these tables, the parallel texts could easily be looked up, but it also remained possible to read a gospel in its normal order. (The number of sections was: Matthew 355, Mark 236, Luke 342, John 232 – together 1165 sections). The number of each "Ammonian section" is written in the margin of a manuscript, and underneath these numbers, another number was written in coloured ink. The coloured numbers referred to one of the ten Eusebian canons, in which the reference numbers were to be found of the parallel sections in the other gospels.

== Text ==
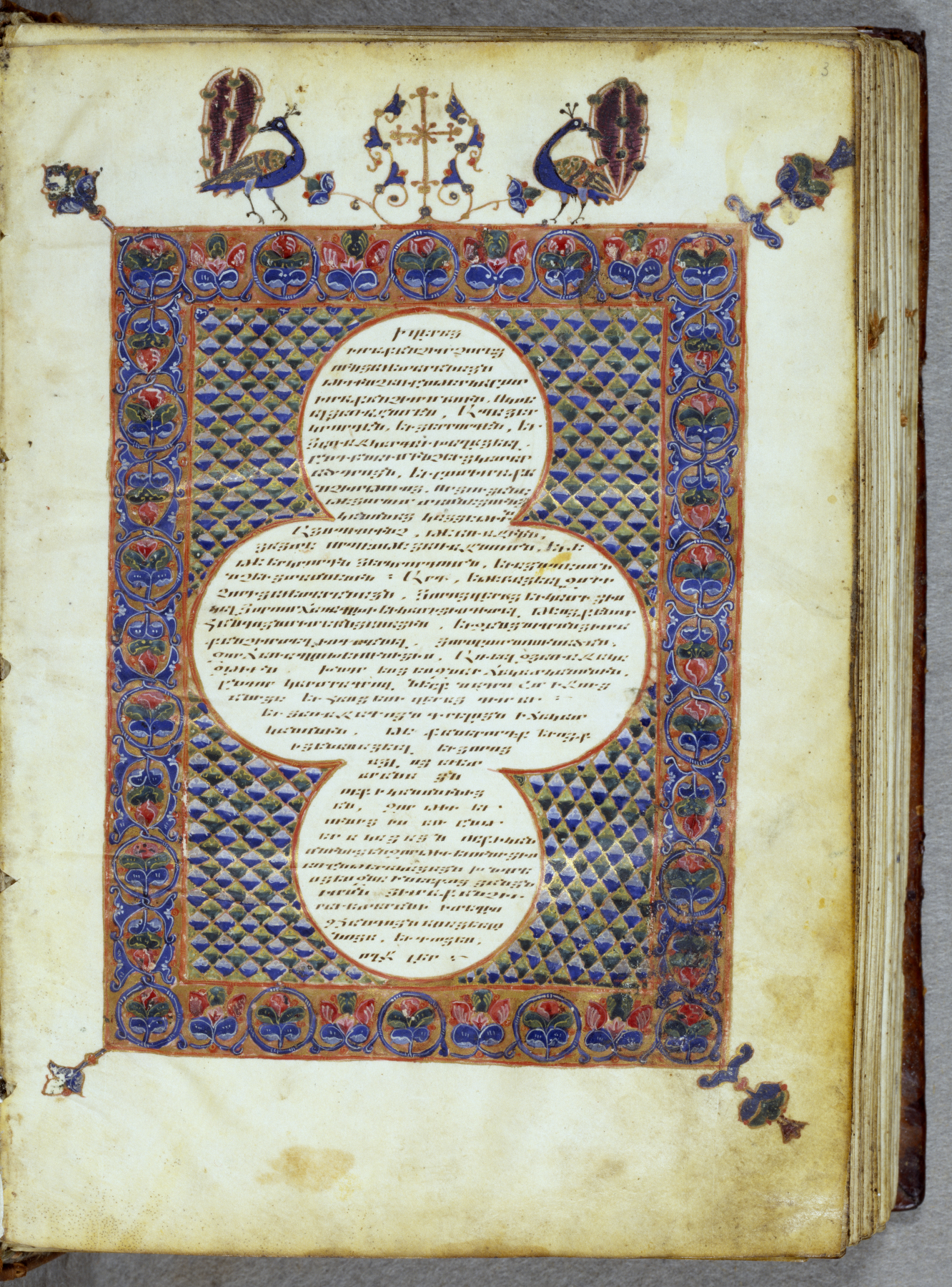
Letter of Eusebius to Carpianus, Armenian manuscript 1193. Walters Art Museum

The text of this epistle in Koine Greek is:

᾿Ευσέβιος Καρπιανῷ ἀγαπητῷ ἀδελφῷ ἐν κυρίῳ χαίρειν.

Ἀμμώνιος μὲν ὁ Ἀλεξανδρεὺς πολλὴν ὡς εἰκὸς φιλοπονίαν καὶ σπουδὴν εἰσαγηοχὼς τὸ διὰ τεσσάρων ἡμῖν καταλέλοιπεν εὐαγγέλιον, τῷ κατὰ Ματθαῖον τὰς ὁμοφώνους τῶν λοιπῶν εὐαγγελιστῶν περικοπὰς παραθείς, ὡς ἐξ ἀνάγκης συμβῆναι τὸν τῆς ἀκολουθίας εἱρμὸν τῶν τριῶν διαφθαρῆναι ὅσον ἐπὶ τῷ ὕφει τῆς ἀναγνώσεως· ἵνα δὲ σωζομένου καὶ τοῦ τῶν λοιπῶν διʼ ὅλου σώματός τε καὶ εἱρμοῦ εἰδέναι ἔχοις τοὺς οἰκείους ἑκάστου εὐαγγελιστοῦ τόπους, ἐν οἷς κατὰ τῶν αὐτῶν ἠνέχθησαν φιλαλήθως εἰπεῖν, ἐκ τοῦ πονήματος τοῦ προειρημένου ἀνδρὸς εἰληφὼς ἀφορμὰς καθʼ ἑτέραν μέθοδον κανόνας δέκα τὸν ἀριθμὸν διεχάραξά σοι τοὺς ὑποτεταγμένους. ὧν ὁ μὲν πρῶτος περιέχει ἀριθμοὺς ἐν οἷς τὰ παραπλήσια εἰρήκασιν οἱ τέσσαρες, Ματθαῖος Μάρκος Λοῦκας Ἰωάννης· ὁ δεύτερος, ἐν ᾧ οἱ τρεῖς, Ματθαῖος Μάρκος Λουκᾶς· ὁ τρίτος, ἐν ᾧ οἱ τρεῖς, Ματθαῖος Λουκᾶς Ἰωάννες· ὁ τέταρτος, ἐν ᾧ οἱ τρεῖς, Ματθαῖος Μάρκος Ἰωάννης· ὁ πέμπτος, ἐν ᾧ οἱ δύο, Ματθαῖος Λουκᾶς· ὁ ἕκτος, ἐν ᾧ οἱ δύο, Ματθαῖος Μάρκος· ὁ ἕβδομος, ἐν ᾧ οἱ δύο, Ματθαῖος Ἰωάννης· ὁ ὄγδοος, ἐν ᾧ οἱ δύο, Λοuκᾶς Μάρκος· ὁ ἕνατος, ἐν ᾧ οἱ δύο, Λουκᾶς Ἰωάννης· ὁ δέκατος, ἐν ᾧ ἕκαστος αὐτῶν περί τινων ἰδίως ἀνέγραψεν. αὕτη μὲν οὖν ἡ τῶν ὑποτεταγμένων κανόνων ὑπόθεσις, ἡ δὲ σαφὴς αὑτῶν διήγησίς ἐστιν ἥδε. ἐφʼ ἑκάστῳ τῶν τεσσάρων εὐαγγελίων ἀριθμός τις πρόκειται, κατὰ μέρος ἀρχόμενος ἀπὸ τοῦ πρώτου, εἶτα δευτέρου καὶ τρίτου, καὶ καθεξῆς προϊὼν διʼ ὅλου μέχρι τοῦ τέλους τῶν βιβλίων. καθʼ ἕκαστον δὲ ἀριθμὸν ὑποσημείωσις πρόκειται διὰ κινναβάρεως, δηλοῦσα ἐν ποίῳ τῶν δέκα κανόνων κείμενος ὁ ἀριθμὸς τυγχάνει. οἷον εἰ μὲν αʹ, δῆλον ὡς ἐν τῷ πρώτῳ· εἰ δὲ βʹ, ἐν τῷ δευτέρῳ· καὶ οὕτως μέχρι τῶν δέκα. εἰ οὖν ἀναπτύξας ἔν τι τῶν τεσσάρων εὐαγγελίων ὁποιονδήποτε βουληθείης ἐπιστῆσαί τινι ᾧ βούλει κεφαλαίῳ, καὶ γνῶναι τίνες τὰ παραπλήσια εἰρήκασιν, καὶ τοὺς οἰκείους ἐν ἑκάστῳ τόπους εὑρεῖν, ἐν οἷς κατὰ τῶν αὐτῶν ἠνέχθησαν, ἧς ἐπέχεις περικοπῆς ἀναλαβὼν τὸν προκείμενον ἀριθμόν, ἐπιζητήσας τε αὐτὸν ἔνδον ἐν τῷ κανόνι ὃν ἡ διὰ τοῦ κινναβάρεως ὑποσημείωσις ὑποβέβληκεν, εἴσῃ μὲν εὐθὺς ἐκ τῶν ἐπὶ μετώπου τοῦ κανόνος προγραφῶν ὁπόσοι τε καὶ τίνες περὶ οὗ ζητεῖς εἰρήκασιν· ἐπιστήσας δὲ καὶ τοῖς τῶν λοιπῶν εὐαγγελίων ἀριθμοῖς τοῖς ἐν τῷ κανόνι ᾧ ἐπέχεις ἀριθμῷ παρακειμένοις, ἐπιζητήσας τε αὐτοὺς ἔνδον ἐν τοῖς οἰκείοις ἑκάστου εὐαγγελίου τόποις, τὰ παραπλήσια λέγοντας αὐτοὺς εὑρήσεις.

English translation:

Eusebius to Carpianus his beloved brother in the Lord: greetings.

Ammonius the Alexandrian, having exerted a great deal of energy and effort as was necessary, bequeaths to us a harmonized account of the four gospels. Alongside the Gospel according to Matthew, he placed the corresponding sections of the other gospels. But this had the inevitable result of ruining the sequential order of the other three gospels, as far as a continuous reading of the text was concerned. Keeping, however, both the body and sequence of the other gospels completely intact, in order that you may be able to know where each evangelist wrote passages in which they were led by love of truth to speak about the same things, I drew up a total of ten tables according to another system, acquiring the raw data from the work of the man mentioned above. These tables are set out for you below.

The first of them lists the reference numbers for similar things recounted in the four gospels, Matthew, Mark, Luke, and John; the second in the three, Matthew, Mark, and Luke; the third in the three, Matthew, Luke, and John; the fourth in the three, Matthew, Mark, and John; the fifth in the two, Matthew, and Luke; the sixth in the two, Matthew and Mark; the seventh in the two, Matthew and John; the eighth in the two, Mark and Luke; the ninth in the two, Luke and John; the tenth is for unique things recorded in each gospel.

Now that I have outlined the structure of the tables set out below, I will explain how to use them. In each of the four gospels, consecutive reference numbers are assigned to each section, starting from the first, then the second, and the third, and so on in sequence, proceeding through the whole gospel to the book's end. Every reference number has a numeral written below it in red that indicates in which of the ten tables the reference number is located. If the red numeral is a I, the reference number is clearly in the first table, and if it is a II, in the second, and thus in sequence to the numeral ten.

And so, suppose you open one of the four gospels at some point, wishing to go to a certain chapter in order to know what gospels recount similar things and to find in each gospel the related passages in which the evangelists were led to speak about the same things. By using the reference number assigned for the section in which you are interested and looking for it within the table indicated by the red numeral below it, you will immediately discover from the titles at the head of the table how many and which gospels recount similar things. By going to the other gospels' reference numbers that are in the same row as the reference number in the table you are at and looking them up in the related passages of each gospel, you will find similar things mentioned.

The copy of this letter appears with the canon tables on the opening folios of many Greek Gospel manuscripts (e.g. 021, 65, 108, 109, 112, 113, 114, 117, etc.). The epistle is also given in modern editions of Greek New Testament.
