= List of New Testament minuscules (801–900) =

A New Testament minuscule is a copy of a portion of the New Testament written in a small, cursive Greek script (developed from Uncial).

== Legend ==
- The numbers (#) are the now standard system of Caspar René Gregory, often referred to as the Gregory-Aland numbers.
- Included among the cataloged minuscules are the following types of manuscripts, color coded:

Grey represents continuous text manuscripts containing only New Testament portions
Beige represents manuscripts with New Testament portions and a catena (quotations from church fathers)
Light cyan represents manuscripts of single-author commentaries who included the full Scripture text.
Light red represents manuscripts of single-author commentaries who included both the full Scripture text and a catena.
Light purple represents manuscripts of commentaries where the Scripture text was abridged.
White represents manuscript numbers no longer in use.

- Dates are estimated to the nearest 100 year increment where specific date is unknown.
- Content generally only describes sections of the New Testament: Gospels, The Acts of the Apostles (Acts), Pauline epistles, and so on. Sometimes the surviving portion of a codex is so limited that specific books, chapters or even verses can be indicated. Linked articles, where they exist, generally specify content in detail, by verse.
- Digital images are referenced with direct links to the hosting web pages, with the exception of those at the INTF. The quality and accessibility of the images is as follows:

Gold color indicates high resolution color images available online.
Tan color indicates high resolution color images available locally, not online.
Light tan color indicates only a small fraction of manuscript pages with color images available online.
Light gray color indicates black/white or microfilm images available online.
Light blue color indicates manuscript not imaged, and is currently lost or ownership unknown.
Light pink color indicates manuscript destroyed, presumed destroyed, or deemed too fragile to digitize.
Violet color indicates high resolution ultraviolet images available online.

† Indicates the manuscript has damaged or missing pages.
^{P} Indicates only a portion of the books were included.
^{K} Indicates manuscript also includes a commentary.
^{S} Indicates lost portions of manuscript replaced via supplement of a later hand.
^{abs} (abschrift) Indicates manuscript is copy.
[ ] Brackets around Gregory-Aland number indicate the manuscript belongs to an already numbered manuscript, was found to not be a continuous text manuscript, was found to be written in modern Greek versus Koine Greek, was proved a forgery, or has been destroyed.

== Minuscules 801-900 ==
#	Date	Contents	Pages	Institution and refs.	City, State	Country	Images
801	14th	Gospels, Acts, Pauline Epistles, General Epistles	324	National Library, 130	Athens	Greece	CSNTM
801	14th	Gospels, Acts, Pauline Epistles, General Epistles	324	National Library, 130	Athens	Greece	INTF
802	14th	Luke 1:1-6:13†	24	National Library, 99	Athens	Greece	CSNTM
803	16th	Matthew, Mark, Luke	215	National Library, 88	Athens	Greece	CSNTM
803	16th	Matthew, Mark, Luke	215	National Library, 88	Athens	Greece	INTF
804	11th	Gospels†	261	Hellenic Parliament Library, HPL 2	Athens	Greece	CSNTM
804	11th	Gospels†	261	Hellenic Parliament Library, HPL 2	Athens	Greece	INTF
805	13th	Matthew, Mark, and Luke†	244	Hellenic Parliament Library, HPL 351	Athens	Greece	CSNTM
806	14th	Gospels	368	Hellenic Parliament Library, HPL 3	Athens	Greece	CSNTM
807 + [1368]	12th	Gospels†	281	Hellenic Parliament Library, HPL 1	Athens	Greece	CSNTM
807 + [1368]	12th	Gospels†	281	Hellenic Parliament Library, HPL 1	Athens	Greece	INTF
808	14th	New Testament	414	National Library, 2251	Athens	Greece	CSNTM
809	11th	Gospels	284	National Library, 2364	Athens	Greece	CSNTM
809	11th	Gospels	284	National Library, 2364	Athens	Greece	INTF
810							
811	13th	Gospels	289	National Library, 2814	Athens	Greece	CSNTM
[812] + 2278							
813	12th	Matthew†, Mark†, Luke†	70	Owner unknown			
814	13th	Commentary on the Gospels		Owner unknown			
[815] + 2276							
[816] + 2277							
817	15th	Theophylact Commentary on the Gospels	255	Basel University Library, A. III. 15	Basel	Switzerland	INTF
818	14th	Theophylact Commentary on the Gospels	373	Royal Site of San Lorenzo de El Escorial, Ψ. ΙΙΙ. 13	San Lorenzo de El Escorial	Spain	INTF
819	14th	Theophylact Commentary on Matthew, John	361	Royal Site of San Lorenzo de El Escorial, Ψ. ΙΙΙ. 14	San Lorenzo de El Escorial	Spain	INTF
820	1292	Theophylact Commentary on the Gospels	410	Royal Site of San Lorenzo de El Escorial, Ω. Ι. 16	San Lorenzo de El Escorial	Spain	INTF
821	16th	John	281	National Library, 4673, fol. 262-542	Madrid	Spain	INTF
822	12th	Matthew† (Nicetas Catena)	281	National Library, 4739	Madrid	Spain	INTF
823	13th	Gospels^{S}†, Acts, Pauline Epistles, General Epistles	251	Jagiellonian Library, Graec. Oct. 13	Kraków	Poland	INTF
824	12th	New Testament	366	Exarchist Monastery of Saint Mary, A. a. 1	Grottaferrata	Italy	INTF
825	12th	Gospels	337	Exarchist Monastery of Saint Mary, A. a. 2	Grottaferrata	Italy	INTF, CSNTM
826	12th	Gospels	233	Exarchist Monastery of Saint Mary, A. a. 3	Grottaferrata	Italy	INTF, CSNTM
827	13th	Gospels†	225	Exarchist Monastery of Saint Mary, A. a. 4	Grottaferrata	Italy	INTF
828	12th	Gospels	176	Exarchist Monastery of Saint Mary, A. a. 5	Grottaferrata	Italy	CSNTM, INTF
829	12th	Gospels†	222	Exarchist Monastery of Saint Mary, A. a. 6	Grottaferrata	Italy	INTF
830	13th	Gospels†	122	Exarchist Monastery of Saint Mary, A. a. 8	Grottaferrata	Italy	INTF, CSNTM
831	11th	Luke 19:25-John 21:25	69	Exarchist Monastery of Saint Mary, A. a. 17	Grottaferrata	Italy	INTF
832	10th	Matthew (abridged), John (abridged), General Epistles	251	Laurentian Library, Plut.06.05	Florence	Italy	BML, INTF
833	14th	Theophylact Commentary on the Gospels	359	Laurentian Library, Plut.06.26	Florence	Italy	BML, INTF
834	14th	Theophylact Commentary on the Gospels	287	Laurentian Library, Plut.11.06	Florence	Italy	BML, INTF
835	1284	Theophylact Commentary on the Gospels	207	Laurentian Library, Plut.11.08	Florence	Italy	BML, INTF
836	14th	Theophylact Commentary on Matthew, Mark, John	277	Laurentian Library, Plut.11.18	Florence	Italy	BML, INTF
837 = [2580]	14th	Matthew†, Mark†	29	Ambrosiana Library, I 94 suss., fol. 38-66	Milan	Italy	INTF
[838] = 657							
839	14th	Gospels	246	University Library, 88	Messina	Italy	INTF
840	13th	Theophylact Commentary on Luke†	125	University Library, 100	Messina	Italy	INTF
841	15th	Theophylact Commentary on Mark, Luke, John	244	Estense Library, G. 178, a.V.7.24 (II F 13)	Modena	Italy	INTF
842	14th	Theophylact Commentary on Matthew†	88	Estense Library, G. 128, a.W.9.26 (III D 9)	Modena	Italy	INTF
843	12th	Gospels†	235	Victor Emmanuel III National Library, Ms. II. A. 37	Naples	Italy	INTF
844	15th	Gospels†	232	University of Padua, Libr., ms. 695	Padua	Italy	INTF
845	1330	Gospels	315	Fabroniana Library, 307	Pistoia	Italy	INTF
846	14th	Gospel of Luke 6:32-12:17 (Nicetas Catena)	343	Angelica Library, Ang. Gr. 100	Rome	Italy	IC
846	14th	Gospel of Luke 6:32-12:17 (Nicetas Catena)	343	Angelica Library, Ang. Gr. 100	Rome	Italy	INTF
847	12th	Matthew†, Mark†	280	Angelica Library, Ang. gr. 36	Rome	Italy	IC
848	14th	Theophylact Commentary on Luke	442	Angelica Library, Ang. gr. 21	Rome	Italy	IC
848	14th	Theophylact Commentary on Luke	442	Angelica Library, Ang. gr. 21	Rome	Italy	INTF
849	17th	Cyril Commentary on John 7:25-10:18	152	Vatican Library, Barb.gr.495	Vatican City	Vatican	DVL
850	12th	Cyril Commentary on John 1:1-10:17	381	Vatican Library, Barb.gr.504	Vatican City	Vatican	DVL
850	12th	Cyril Commentary on John 1:1-10:17	381	Vatican Library, Barb.gr.504	Vatican City	Vatican	INTF
851 = [2602]	12th & 14th	Gospels	260	Owner Anonymous	Athens	Greece	INTF
852	ca. 1300	Gospels†	165	Vatican Library, Borg.gr.9	Vatican City	Vatican	INTF
853	15th	Luke 6:29-12:10 (Nicetas Catena)	320	Casanata Library, 715	Rome	Italy	INTF
854	1286	Theophylact Commentary on the Gospels	467	Vatican Library, Vat.gr.641	Vatican City	Vatican	INTF
855	12th	Theophylact Commentary on the Gospels	584	Vatican Library, Vat.gr.643	Vatican City	Vatican	INTF
856	1279-80	Theophylact Commentary on the Gospels	349	Vatican Library, Vat.gr.644	Vatican City	Vatican	INTF
857	12th	Theophylact Commentary on the Luke, John	391	Vatican Library, Vat.gr.645	Vatican City	Vatican	INTF
858	14th	Theophylact Commentary on the Gospels	338	Vatican Library, Vat.gr.647	Vatican City	Vatican	INTF
859	16th	Luke (Nicetas Catena)	261	Vatican Library, Vat.gr.759	Vatican City	Vatican	INTF
860	12th/13th	Matthew, Mark, Luke	144	Vatican Library, Vat.gr.774, fol. 17-160 (fol. 1-16; ℓ 2354)	Vatican City	Vatican	INTF
861	16th	Gospels	510	Vatican Library, Vat.gr.1090	Vatican City	Vatican	INTF
862	12th	Theophylact Commentary on John	402	Vatican Library, Vat.gr.1191	Vatican City	Vatican	INTF
863	1154	Theophylact Commentary on the Gospels†	400	Vatican Library, Vat.gr.1221	Vatican City	Vatican	DVL, INTF
864	14th	Gospels	550	Vatican Library, Vat.gr.1253	Vatican City	Vatican	INTF
865	15th	John	123	Vatican Library, Vat.gr.1472	Vatican City	Vatican	INTF
866	12th	Matthew 7:24-10:40	7	Vatican Library, Vat.gr.1882, fol. 10-16	Vatican City	Vatican	DVL
866	12th	Matthew 7:24-10:40	7	Vatican Library, Vat.gr.1882, fol. 10-16	Vatican City	Vatican	INTF
867	14th	Gospels†	223	Vatican Library, Vat.gr.1895	Vatican City	Vatican	DVL, INTF
868	17th	Luke†	624	Vatican Library, Vat.gr.1933	Vatican City	Vatican	INTF
869	12th	John 6:20-11:57 (Nicetas Catena)	245	Vatican Library, Vat.gr.1996	Vatican City	Vatican	DVL, INTF
870	11th	Luke 11:5-16:14	14	Vatican Library, Vat.gr.2115, fol. 166-179	Vatican City	Vatican	DVL, INTF
871	13th	Gospels†	164	Vatican Library, Vat.gr.2117	Vatican City	Vatican	INTF
872	12th	Gospels†	180	Vatican Library, Vat.gr.2160	Vatican City	Vatican	INTF
873	11th	Gospels	289	Vatican Library, Vat.gr.2165	Vatican City	Vatican	INTF
874	13th	Theophylact Commentary on John	383	Vatican Library, Vat.gr.2187	Vatican City	Vatican	INTF
875	10th	Gospels	288	Vatican Library, Vat.gr.2247	Vatican City	Vatican	INTF
876	12th	Acts, Pauline Epistles, General Epistles	282	University of Michigan, Ms. 16	Ann Arbor, MI	USA	CSNTM
876	12th	Acts, Pauline Epistles, General Epistles	282	University of Michigan, Ms. 16	Ann Arbor, MI	USA	INTF
877	1197	Gospels	218	Vatican Library, Vat.gr.2290	Vatican City	Vatican	DVL
877	1197	Gospels	218	Vatican Library, Vat.gr.2290	Vatican City	Vatican	INTF
878	12th	Theophylact Commentary on the Gospels	248	Vatican Library, Ott.gr.37	Vatican City	Vatican	DVL
878	12th	Theophylact Commentary on the Gospels	248	Vatican Library, Ott.gr.37	Vatican City	Vatican	INTF
879	16th	Luke 6:29-12:10 (Nicetas Catena)	105	Vatican Library, Ott.gr.100	Vatican City	Vatican	DVL
879	16th	Luke 6:29-12:10 (Nicetas Catena)	105	Vatican Library, Ott.gr.100	Vatican City	Vatican	INTF
880	15th	Gospels	355	Vatican Library, Ott.gr.208	Vatican City	Vatican	DVL
880	15th	Gospels	355	Vatican Library, Ott.gr.208	Vatican City	Vatican	INTF
881	15th	Theophylact Commentary on the Gospels	523	Vatican Library, Ott.gr.453-455	Vatican City	Vatican	INTF
882	10th	Chrysostom Homilies on John	181	Vatican Library, Pal.gr.32	Vatican City	Vatican	HU
883	15th	Theophylact Commentary on John	247	Vatican Library, Pal.gr.208	Vatican City	Vatican	HU
884	11th	Luke, John	256	Vatican Library, Reg.gr.3	Vatican City	Vatican	INTF
885	15th	Gospels (Gospel of John abridged)	486	Vatican Library, Reg.gr.5	Vatican City	Vatican	INTF
886	1454	Theophylact Commentary on the Gospels, Acts, Pauline Epistles, Revelation†	336	Vatican Library, Reg.gr.6	Vatican City	Vatican	INTF
887	11th	John	197	Vatican Library, Reg.gr.9	Vatican City	Vatican	INTF
888	14th	Theophylact Commentary on the Gospels	307	Marciana National Library, Gr. Z. 26 (340)	Venice	Italy	INTF
889	14th	Theophylact Commentary on the Gospels	224	Marciana National Library, Gr. Z. 30 (342)	Venice	Italy	INTF
890	14th	Theophylact Commentary on the Gospels	397	Marciana National Library, Gr. Z. 31 (321)	Venice	Italy	INTF
891	14th	Theophylact Commentary on the Gospels, Pauline Epistles†	474	Marciana National Library, Gr. Z. 32 (689)	Venice	Italy	INTF
892	9th	Gospels†	353	British Library, Add MS 33277	London	UK	BL
892	9th	Gospels†	353	British Library, Add MS 33277	London	UK	INTF
893	12th	Matthew 1:4–9:8 (Nicetas Catena)	484	Marciana National Library, Gr. I,61	Venice	Italy	INTF
894	11th	Mark 10:25-35, 14:62–15:46	1	The Schøyen Collection, MS 583/2	Oslo	Norway	INTF
894	11th	Mark 10:25-35, 14:62–15:46	4	Marciana National Library, Gr. II,144 (1362)	Venice	Italy	INTF
895 = [2366]	13th	Gospels	239	Princeton University Library, Garrett MS. 7	Princeton	USA	CSNTM
896	12th	Gospels	275	Cambridge University Library, Add. Mss. 6677	Cambridge	UK	INTF
897	13th	Gospels†	327	Edinburgh University Library, Ms. 220 (D Laing 6)	Edinburgh	UK	CSNTM
897	13th	Gospels†	327	Edinburgh University Library, Ms. 220 (D Laing 6)	Edinburgh	UK	INTF
898	13th	Gospels†	18	Historical Museum of Crete, s.n.	Heraklion, Crete	Greece	INTF
898	13th	Gospels†	79	Edinburgh University Library, Ms. 221 (D Laing 667)	Edinburgh	UK	CSNTM
899	11th	Gospels†	208	Uppsala University, Gr. 4	Uppsala	Sweden	UU
899	11th	Gospels†	208	Uppsala University, Gr. 4	Uppsala	Sweden	INTF
900	13th	Gospels	288	Uppsala University, Gr. 9	Uppsala	Sweden	UU

[top]

== See also ==
- List of New Testament papyri
- List of New Testament uncials
- List of New Testament minuscules (1–1000)
- List of New Testament minuscules (1001–2000)
- List of New Testament minuscules (2001–)
- List of New Testament minuscules ordered by Location/Institution
- List of New Testament lectionaries

== Bibliography ==
- Aland, Kurt; M. Welte; B. Köster; K. Junack (1994). Kurzgefasste Liste der griechischen Handschriften des Neues Testaments. Berlin, New York: Walter de Gruyter. p. 95. ISBN 3-11-011986-2.
- "Liste Handschriften". Münster: Institute for New Testament Textual Research.
