= List of New Testament minuscules (2201–2300) =

A New Testament minuscule is a copy of a portion of the New Testament written in a small, cursive Greek script (developed from Uncial).

== Legend ==
- The numbers (#) are the now standard system of Caspar René Gregory, often referred to as the Gregory-Aland numbers.
- Included among the cataloged minuscules are the following types of manuscripts, color coded:

Grey represents continuous text manuscripts containing only New Testament portions
Beige represents manuscripts with New Testament portions and a catena (quotations from church fathers)
Light cyan represents manuscripts of single-author commentaries who included the full Scripture text.
Light red represents manuscripts of single-author commentaries who included both the full Scripture text and a catena.
Light purple represents manuscripts of commentaries where the Scripture text was abridged.
White represents manuscript numbers no longer in use.

- Dates are estimated to the nearest 100 year increment where specific date is unknown.
- Content generally only describes sections of the New Testament: Gospels, The Acts of the Apostles (Acts), Pauline epistles, and so on. Sometimes the surviving portion of a codex is so limited that specific books, chapters or even verses can be indicated. Linked articles, where they exist, generally specify content in detail, by verse.
- Digital images are referenced with direct links to the hosting web pages, with the exception of those at the INTF. The quality and accessibility of the images is as follows:

Gold color indicates high resolution color images available online.
Tan color indicates high resolution color images available locally, not online.
Light tan color indicates only a small fraction of manuscript pages with color images available online.
Light gray color indicates black/white or microfilm images available online.
Light blue color indicates manuscript not imaged, and is currently lost or ownership unknown.
Light pink color indicates manuscript destroyed, presumed destroyed, or deemed too fragile to digitize.
Violet color indicates high resolution ultraviolet images available online.

† Indicates the manuscript has damaged or missing pages.
^{P} Indicates only a portion of the books were included.
^{K} Indicates manuscript also includes a commentary.
^{S} Indicates lost portions of manuscript replaced via supplement of a later hand.
^{abs} (abschrift) Indicates manuscript is copy.
[ ] Brackets around Gregory-Aland number indicate the manuscript belongs to an already numbered manuscript, was found to not be a continuous text manuscript, was found to be written in modern Greek versus Koine Greek, was proved a forgery, or has been destroyed.

== Minuscules 2201–2300 ==
#	Date	Contents	Pages	Institution and refs.	City, State	Country	Images
2201	15th	New Testament†	205	Monastery of Olympiotissa, 6	Elassona	Greece	INTF
2202	13th	Theophylact Commentary on Matthew†, Luke†, John†	88	Monastery of Olympiotissa, 27	Elassona	Greece	INTF
2203	13th	Theophylact Commentary on the Gospels†	232	Monastery of Olympiotissa, 53	Elassona	Greece	INTF
2204	15th	Gospels†	219	Monastery of Olympiotissa, 51	Elassona	Greece	INTF
[2205] = 2659							
2206	15th	Theophylact Commentary on the Gospels	416	Greek Orthodox Patriarchate, 2457	Alexandria	Egypt	INTF
2207	16th	Theophylact Commentary on Matthew†, Mark†	170	Greek Orthodox Patriarchate, 100	Alexandria	Egypt	INTF
2208	14th	Pauline Epistles †	1?	Greek Orthodox Patriarchate, 372	Alexandria	Egypt	INTF
[2209]=2592							
[2210]= ℓ1908							
2211	13th	Gospels	365	Kipoureon Monastery	Lixouri, Cephalonia	Greece	INTF
[2212]= ℓ2049							
2213	15th	Gospels	332	Jakovatos	Lixouri, Cephalonia	Greece	INTF
2214	14th	Theophylact Commentary on the Gospels	419	Center for Slavic and Byzantine Studies, 233 (Kosinitza, 79)	Sofia	Bulgaria	INTF
2215	12th	Gospels	223	Metropolis Library	Larnaca	Cyprus	INTF
2216	12th	Gospels †	195	Owner unknown			
2217	12th	Gospels	240	Leimonos Monastery, Ms. Lesbiacus Leimonos 294	Kalloni, Lesbos	Greece	LM
2217	12th	Gospels	240	Leimonos Monastery, Ms. Lesbiacus Leimonos 294	Kalloni, Lesbos	Greece	INTF
2218	16th	Acts, Pauline Epistles, General Epistles	200	Leimonos Monastery, Ms. Lesbiacus Leimonos 297	Kalloni, Lesbos	Greece	INTF
[2219] = 1715							
2220	12th	Gospels†	201	Leimonos Monastery, Ms. Lesbiacus Leimonos 507	Kalloni, Lesbos	Greece	LM
2221	1432	Gospels, Acts, Pauline Epistles, General Epistles	376	Museum of Ecclesiastical Art, 5	Sparta	Greece	INTF
2222	14th	Gospels	2	Walters Art Museum, Ms. W. 523	Baltimore, MD	USA	WAM
2222	14th	Gospels	2	Owner Unknown			
2222	14th	Gospels	125	The University of Chicago Library, Ms. 138 (Goodspeed)	Chicago, IL	USA	TUOCL
2223	1282	Gospels †	183	Agios Lavrentios Church, 15	Pelion	Greece	INTF
2224	9th	Gospels	453	Mega Spileo Monastery, 1	Kalavryta	Greece	INTF
[2225]	1292	Acts, Pauline Epistles, General Epistles	154	Destroyed, formerly Mega Spileo Monastery, 4	Kalavryta	Greece	
[2226]	12th	Gospels	228	Destroyed, formerly Mega Spileo Monastery, 5	Kalavryta	Greece	
[2227]	14th	Gospels	229	Destroyed, formerly Mega Spileo Monastery, 6	Kalavryta	Greece	
[2228]	11th	Gospels	221	Destroyed, formerly Mega Spileo Monastery, 7	Kalavryta	Greece	
2229	11th	Gospels	301	Mega Spileo Monastery, 8	Kalavryta	Greece	INTF
[2230]	13th	Gospels †	121	Destroyed, formerly Mega Spileo Monastery, 9	Kalavryta	Greece	
[2231]	12th	Mark, Luke, John	156	Destroyed, formerly Mega Spileo Monastery, 10	Kalavryta	Greece	
[2232]	12th	Gospels	159	Destroyed, formerly Mega Spileo Monastery, 15	Kalavryta	Greece	
[2233]	12th	Acts, Pauline Epistles, General Epistles †	219	Destroyed, formerly Mega Spileo Monastery, 27	Kalavryta	Greece	
[2234]	13th	Gospels	226	Destroyed, formerly Mega Spileo Monastery, 41	Kalavryta	Greece	
[2235]	15th	Gospels †	298	Destroyed, formerly Mega Spileo Monastery, 42	Kalavryta	Greece	
2236	13th	Gospels	153	Zoodochu Pigis	Lesbos	Greece	INTF
2237	16th	Matthew †	23	Ipsilou Monastery (St. John the Theologian), 13, fol. 129-151	Antissa, Lesbos	Greece	INTF
2238	13th	Gospels	255	Ipsilou Monastery (St. John the Theologian), 54. 55, 42, 113 fol.	Antissa, Lesbos	Greece	INTF
[2239]	18th	Commentary on Acts, Pauline Epistles, General Epistles†	403	National Library, Taphu 289	Athens	Greece	INTF
2240	1661	Romans†	559	National Library, Taphu 755	Athens	Greece	
[2241]= ℓ1390							
2242	12th	Theodoret Commentary on Acts†, Romans†, 1 Corinthians†	394	National Library, Supplement Grec 1299	Paris	France	BnF, INTF
2243	17th	Acts, Pauline Epistles, General Epistles	103	National Library, 222, fol. 144-246	Athens	Greece	CSNTM
2243	17th	Acts, Pauline Epistles, General Epistles	103	National Library, 222, fol. 144-246	Athens	Greece	INTF
2244	11th-12th	Gospels	356	Albania National Archives, Kod. Br. 15	Tirana	Albania	CSNTM
2245	13th	Gospels	286	Albania National Archives, Kod. Br. 29	Tirana	Albania	CSNTM
2245	13th	Gospels	286	Albania National Archives, Kod. Br. 29	Tirana	Albania	INTF
2246	14th	Gospels†	186	Albania National Archives, Kod. Br. 26	Tirana	Albania	CSNTM
2247	1312	Gospels†	228	Albania National Archives, Kod. Br. 21/35	Tirana	Albania	CSNTM
2247	1312	Gospels†	228	Albania National Archives, Kod. Br. 21/35	Tirana	Albania	INTF
2248	14th	Theophylact Commentary on the Pauline Epistles†	300	Library of the Greek Orthodox Patriarchate, Saba 149	Jerusalem		LOC, INTF, CSNTM
2249	1330	Gospels†, Acts†, General Epistles†	372	Center for Slavic and Byzantine Studies, 193 (Kosinitza, 221)	Sofia	Bulgaria	INTF
2250	13th-14th	Gospels †	102	Center for Slavic and Byzantine Studies, 56 (Kosinitza, 239)	Sofia	Bulgaria	INTF
[2251]							
2252	11th	Gospels	308	Albanian National Archives, Kod. Vl. 5	Tirana	Albania	CSNTM, INTF
2253	12th-13th	Gospels	304	Albanian National Archives, Kod. Vl. 10	Tirana	Albania	CSNTM, INTF
2254	16th	Revelation	59	Iviron Monastery, 382, fol. 468-526	Mount Athos	Greece	INTF
2255	16th	Gospels, Acts, Pauline Epistles, General Epistles	364	Iviron Monastery, 503	Mount Athos	Greece	INTF
2256	15th	Revelation 1:1-20:11 †	26	Iviron Monastery, 698	Mount Athos	Greece	INTF
2257	14th	Theophylact Commentary on Romans-2 Timothy†	350	Center for Slavic and Byzantine Studies, 218 (Kosinitza, 132)	Sofia	Bulgaria	INTF
2258	17th	Revelation	21	Iviron Monastery, 589, fol. a'- ka'	Mount Athos	Greece	INTF
2259	11th	Andreas of Caesarea Commentary on Revelation 13:14-14:16†	5	Stavronikita Monastery, 25, fol. 325-329	Mount Athos	Greece	INTF; LOC
2260	12th	Gospels†	280	Monastery of Agia Lavra, 30	Kalavryta	Greece	INTF
2261	14th	Gospels, Acts, Pauline Epistles, General Epistles	357	Monastery of Agia Lavra, 31	Kalavryta	Greece	INTF
[2262]	12th	Gospels	190	Manuscript destroyed, formerly Mega Spileo Monastery, 2	Kalavryta	Greece	
2263	12th	Gospels	278	Mega Spileo Monastery, 3, fol. 20-297	Kalavryta	Greece	INTF
2264	13th	Gospels †		Owner unknown			
2265	14th	Gospels	189	Museum of Ecclesiastical Art, 44	Sparta	Greece	INTF
2266	14th	Gospels	253	The University of Chicago Library, Ms. 727 (Goodspeed)	Chicago, IL	USA	TUOCL
2266	14th	Gospels	253	The University of Chicago Library, Ms. 727 (Goodspeed)	Chicago, IL	USA	INTF
2267	1830	Matthew †	74	The Russian National Library Academy of Science, K'pel 165	Saint Petersburg	Russia	INTF
2268	ca. 1300	Mark 1:1-14 †	1	Duke University, Gk MS 4	Durham	USA	DU
2269	12th	Matthew †	1	The Russian National Library Academy of Science, K'pel 70	Saint Petersburg	Russia	INTF
[2270] = 2311							
2271	12th	Gospels †	1?	Owner unknown (Formerly Istanbul, Russ. Arch. Inst., A 16)			
[2272] = 1826							
2273	14th	Gospels	323	The Russian National Library Academy of Science, K'pel 86	Saint Petersburg	Russia	INTF
2274	14th	Matthew †	4	The Russian National Library Academy of Science, K'pel 84	Saint Petersburg	Russia	INTF
2275	11th	Mark †	6	The Russian National Library Academy of Science, K'pel 72	Saint Petersburg	Russia	INTF
2276+[815]	14th	Matthew†	1	British Library, Add MS 35123, fol. 469	London	United Kingdom	INTF
2277+[816]	11th	Gospels	259	British Library, Add MS 37001	London	United Kingdom	BL
2277+[816]	11th	Gospels	259	British Library, Add MS 37001	London	United Kingdom	INTF
2278+[812]	14th	Gospels	254	British Library, Add MS 37002	London	United Kingdom	BL
2279	14th	Acts†, Pauline Epistles (Romans†), General Epistles	235	British Library, Add MS 37003	London	United Kingdom	BL
2280	12th	Gospels†	276	British Library, Add MS 36752	London	United Kingdom	BL
2280	12th	Gospels†	276	British Library, Add MS 36752	London	United Kingdom	INTF
2281	11th	Gospels	239	John Rylands University Library, Gr. Ms. 1	Manchester	United Kingdom	INTF
2282	11th	Gospels†	204	John Rylands University Library, Gr. Ms. 7	Manchester	United Kingdom	INTF
2283	13th	Gospels	180	John Rylands University Library, Gr. Ms. 13	Manchester	United Kingdom	INTF
2284	13th	Gospels	324	John Rylands University Library, Gr. Ms. 18	Manchester	United Kingdom	INTF
2285	12th	Zigabenus Commentary on Matthew†, Mark†, Luke†	120	Esphigmenou Monastery, 38	Mount Athos	Greece	
2286	12th	Revelation^{K}	44	Stavronikita Monastery, 48, fol. 63-106	Mount Athos	Greece	MAR
2287	11th	Gospels	278	Agion Theodoron Monastery, 1	Kalavryta	Greece	INTF
2288	15th	Acts, General Epistles	104	Estense Library, G. 13, a.U.2.14 (II A 13)	Modena	Italy	INTF
2288	15th	Pauline Epistles	122	Gothenburg University Library, Cod. Gr. 2	Gothenburg	Sweden	GUL
2288	15th	Pauline Epistles	122	Gothenburg University Library, Cod. Gr. 2	Gothenburg	Sweden	INTF
2289	12th	Acts†, Pauline Epistles†, General Epistles†	185	Vatopedi Monastery, 857	Mount Athos	Greece	INTF
2290	10th	Matthew†^{S}, Mark, Luke, John†^{S}	203	British Library, Add MS 37320	London	United Kingdom	BL
2291	13th	Gospels	227	British Library, Add MS 37485, Add MS 37486	London	United Kingdom	BL, BL
2291	13th	Gospels	227	British Library, Add MS 37485, Add MS 37486	London	United Kingdom	INTF
2292	1283	Gospels	221	Austrian National Library, Suppl. gr. 107	Vienna	Austria	ANL
[2293]=1282							
[2294]=2466							
2295	11th	Gospels	241	John Rylands University Library, Gr. Ms. 2	Manchester	United Kingdom	INTF
2296	12th	Gospels	253	John Rylands University Library, Gr. Ms. 10	Manchester	United Kingdom	INTF
2297	11th	Gospels	253	Monastery of Saint John the Theologian, 72	Patmos	Greece	CSNTM
2297	11th	Gospels	253	Monastery of Saint John the Theologian, 72	Patmos	Greece	INTF
2298	12th	Book of Acts, Pauline Epistles	390	National Library, Grec 102	Paris	France	BnF
2298	12th	Book of Acts, Pauline Epistles	390	National Library, Grec 102	Paris	France	INTF
2299	11th	Matthew† 13:33–17:25; 18:24–24.20; 25:1–31; 26:64–27.14; 27:35–28.20; Mark† 1:20–6:12.	27	Byzantine and Christian Museum, BXM 52	Athens	Greece	CSNTM
2299	11th	Matthew† 13:33–17:25; 18:24–24.20; 25:1–31; 26:64–27.14; 27:35–28.20; Mark† 1:20–6:12.	27	Byzantine and Christian Museum, BXM 52	Athens	Greece	INTF
2300	13th	Luke† 9:32-11:31	8	Byzantine and Christian Museum, BXM 8	Athens	Greece	CSNTM
2300	13th	Luke† 9:32-11:31	8	Byzantine and Christian Museum, BXM 8	Athens	Greece	INTF

[top]

== See also ==
- List of New Testament papyri
- List of New Testament uncials
- List of New Testament minuscules (1–1000)
- List of New Testament minuscules (1001–2000)
- List of New Testament minuscules (2001–)
- List of New Testament minuscules ordered by Location/Institution
- List of New Testament lectionaries

== Bibliography ==
- Aland, Kurt; M. Welte; B. Köster; K. Junack (1994). Kurzgefasste Liste der griechischen Handschriften des Neues Testaments. Berlin, New York: Walter de Gruyter. p. 95. ISBN 3-11-011986-2.
- "Liste Handschriften". Münster: Institute for New Testament Textual Research.
