= Minuscule 807 =

- New Testament manuscript
- Text: Gospels †
- Date: 12th century
- Script: Greek
- Now at: Hellenic Parliament
- Size: 30 cm by 22 cm
- Type: Byzantine text-type
- Category: none
- Note: –

Minuscule 807 (in the Gregory-Aland numbering), A^{311} (von Soden), is a Greek minuscule manuscript of the New Testament written on parchment, with a commentary. Palaeographically it has been assigned to the 12th century. The manuscript is lacunose.

== Description ==
The codex contains the text of the three first Gospels, on 281 parchment leaves (size 30 cm by 22 cm), with some lacunae (Matthew 1:1-15:29; Mark 1:1-14; Jo 21:8-25). According to Gregory the whole manuscript has 371 leaves (31.2 by 22.9 cm), but first 83 leaves do not contain biblical matter.

The text is written in one column per page, 38-39 lines per page. The biblical text is surrounded by a catena.

The text is divided according to the κεφαλαια (chapters), whose numbers are given at the margin, with their τιτλοι (titles of chapters) at the top of the pages (with a Harmony of the four Gospels). There is also another division according to the Ammonian Sections (in Mark 240 Sections, the last section in 16,19), with references to the Eusebian Canons.

It contains Argumentum to the Gospel of Luke, list of the κεφαλαια (tables of contents) before each of the Gospels, and lectionary markings at the margin for liturgical use.

== Text ==
Aland the Greek text of the codex did not place in any Category.

It was not examined by using the Claremont Profile Method.

It contains text of the Pericope Adulterae (John 7:53-8:11), but without a commentary.

== History ==
According to C. R. Gregory the manuscript was written in the 14th century. The manuscript is currently dated by the INTF to the 12th century.

It was added to the list of New Testament manuscripts by Gregory (807^{e}). Gregory saw the manuscript in 1886. Gregory classified this manuscript also as minuscule 1368 (13th century, 277 leaves (30 by 23 cm), 38 lines per page, κεφαλαια, biblical text in red, commentary in black, lacunae in Matthew, Mark, John). Gregory used description of one Spartaner Strategopoulos. Aland noticed that it is the same manuscript, and 1368 was deleted from the list (empty number on his list).

The manuscript is now housed at the library of the Hellenic Parliament (1) in Athens.

== See also ==
- List of New Testament minuscules
- Biblical manuscript
- Textual criticism
- Minuscule 806
