= Minuscule 863 =

- New Testament manuscript
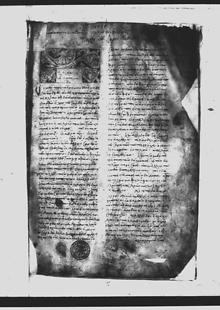
- First page of Matthew
- Text: Gospels †
- Date: 12th century
- Script: Greek
- Now at: Vatican Library
- Size: 38.5 cm × 27 cm (15.2 in × 10.6 in)
- Type: Byzantine?
- Category: none
- Note: commentary

Minuscule 863 (in the Gregory-Aland numbering), Θ^{ε301} (von Soden), is a 12th-century Greek minuscule manuscript of the New Testament on parchment. The manuscript has no complex context.

== Description ==
The codex contains the text of the four Gospels on 400 parchment leaves (size 38.5 cm by 27 cm), with a catena. It has some lacunae (John 18:10-21:25). The text is written in two columns per page, 41 lines per page. The biblical text is surrounded by a catena. The commentary is of Theophylact's authorship. It contains decorated head-pieces and decorated initial letters.

The text is divided according to the κεφαλαια (chapters), whose numbers are given at the margin of the text, and their τιτλοι (titles) at the top of the pages. It contains tables of the κεφαλαια (tables of contents) before each Gospel, lectionary markings at the margin, and subscriptions at the end of each of the Gospels.

== Text ==
Kurt Aland did not place the Greek text of the codex in any Category. It was not examined by the Claremont Profile Method.

== History ==
F. H. A. Scrivener dated the manuscript to the 12th or 13th century, C. R. Gregory dated it to the 13th century. Currently the manuscript is dated by the INTF to the 12th century. According to the colophon it was written in 1154.

The manuscript was added to the list of New Testament manuscripts by Scrivener (676^{e}) and Gregory (863^{e}). Gregory saw it in 1886. It was examined by Kirsopp Lake.

The manuscript once belonged to the Cardinal Antonio Carafa.

Currently the manuscript is housed at the Vatican Library (Gr. 1221), in Rome.

== See also ==
- List of New Testament minuscules
- Biblical manuscript
- Textual criticism
- Minuscule 862
- Minuscule 864
