= Minuscule 865 =

- New Testament manuscript
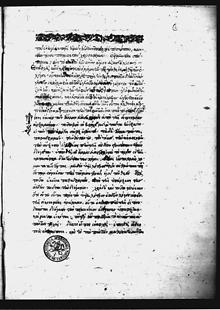
- Folio 1 verso
- Text: Gospel of John
- Date: 15th century
- Script: Greek
- Now at: Vatican Library
- Size: 36 cm by 25 cm
- Type: Byzantine?
- Category: none
- Note: commentary

Minuscule 865 (in the Gregory-Aland numbering), A^{502} (von Soden), is a 15th-century Greek minuscule manuscript of the New Testament on paper. The manuscript has complex context, no marginalia.

== Description ==
The codex contains the text of the four Gospels on 123 paper leaves (size 36 cm by 25 cm), with a catena. It has some lacunae (John 18:10-21:25). The text is written in one column per page, 29 lines per page. The biblical text is surrounded by a catena. The commentary is of Chrysostom's authorship. The text was corrected.

== Text ==
Kurt Aland did not place the Greek text of the codex in any Category.

== History ==
C. R. Gregory dated the manuscript to the 15th century. Currently the manuscript is dated by the INTF to the 15th century.

The manuscript was added to the list of New Testament manuscripts by Gregory (865^{e}). Gregory saw it in 1886.

Currently the manuscript is housed at the Vatican Library (Gr. 1472), in Rome.

== See also ==
- List of New Testament minuscules
- Biblical manuscript
- Textual criticism
- Minuscule 864
- Minuscule 866
