= Minuscule 857 =

- New Testament manuscript
- Text: Gospel of Luke, Gospel of John
- Date: 12th century
- Script: Greek
- Now at: Vatican Library
- Size: 29.4 cm by 21.2 cm
- Type: Byzantine text-type
- Category: V
- Note: commentary

Minuscule 857 (in the Gregory-Aland numbering), Θ^{ε28} (von Soden), is a 12th-century Greek minuscule manuscript of the New Testament on paper. The manuscript has complex content.

== Description ==
The codex contains the text of the Gospel of Luke and Gospel of John on 391 paper leaves (size 29.4 cm by 21.2 cm). The text is written in one column per page, 28 lines per page. It is ornamented.

The text is divided according to the κεφαλαια (chapters), whose numbers are given at the margin, and their τιτλοι (titles) at the top of the pages.

It contains Prolegomena, tables of the κεφαλαια (tables of contents) before each of the Gospels, and a commentary of Theophylact's authorship.

== Text ==
The Greek text of the codex is a representative of the Byzantine text-type. Kurt Aland placed it in any Category V.

It was not examined by the Claremont Profile Method.

== History ==
F. H. A. Scrivener and C. R. Gregory dated the manuscript to the 12th century. Currently the manuscript is dated by the INTF to the 12th century.

The manuscript was added to the list of New Testament manuscripts by Scrivener (670^{e}) and Gregory (857^{e}). Gregory saw it in 1886.

Currently the manuscript is housed at the Vatican Library (Gr. 645), in Rome.

== See also ==
- List of New Testament minuscules
- Biblical manuscript
- Textual criticism
- Minuscule 856
- Minuscule 858
