= Minuscule 861 =

16th-century New Testament transcript

- New Testament manuscript
- Text: Gospels
- Date: 16th century
- Script: Greek
- Now at: Vatican Library
- Size: 27.5 cm by 21 cm
- Type: Byzantine text-type
- Category: V
- Note: commentary

Minuscule 861 (in the Gregory-Aland numbering), A^{601} (von Soden), is a 16th-century Greek minuscule manuscript of the New Testament on paper. The manuscript has complex content.

== Description ==
The codex contains the text of the four Gospels on 510 paper leaves (size 27.5 cm by 21 cm), with a catena. The text is written in one column per page, 21 lines per page. The biblical text is surrounded by a catena. The commentary is of Peter of Laodicea. The manuscript is ornamented. It contains scholia, the text was corrected.

== Text ==
The Greek text of the codex is a representative of the Byzantine text-type. Kurt Aland placed it in Category V. It was not examined by the Claremont Profile Method.

== History ==
F. H. A. Scrivener and C. R. Gregory dated the manuscript to the 16th century. Currently the manuscript is dated by the INTF to the 16th century.

The manuscript was added to the list of New Testament manuscripts by Scrivener (674^{e}) and Gregory (861^{e}). Gregory saw it in 1886.

Currently the manuscript is housed at the Vatican Library (Gr. 1090), in Rome.

== See also ==
- List of New Testament minuscules
- Biblical manuscript
- Textual criticism
- Minuscule 860
- Minuscule 862
