= Minuscule 885 =

15th-century Greek minuscule manuscript of the New Testament on paper

- New Testament manuscript
- Name: Cod. Regin. grec. 5
- Text: Mark-Luke-John
- Date: 15th century
- Script: Greek
- Now at: Vatican Library
- Size: 33 cm by 22.4 cm
- Type: Byzantine
- Category: none

Minuscule 885 (in the Gregory-Aland numbering), is a 15th-century Greek minuscule manuscript of the New Testament on paper. The manuscript has not survived in complete condition.

== Description ==
The codex contains the text of the Gospel of Mark, Gospel of Luke, and Gospel of John, with a commentary, on 486 paper leaves (size 33 cm by 22.4 cm). The text is written in one column per page, 29 lines per page.

The manuscript is lacunose in Gospel of Luke and in Gospel of John. The original manuscript contained also the Gospel of Matthew.

== Text ==
The Greek text of the codex Kurt Aland did not place in any Category.

It was not examined according to the Claremont Profile Method.

== History ==
According to F. H. A. Scrivener and C. R. Gregory it was written in the 15th century. Henry Stevenson dated it to the 14th century. Currently the manuscript is dated by the INTF to the 15th century.

It once belonged to Jerome Vignier († 1661) along with another manuscript formerly listed as minuscule 104^{e}. 104^{e} was delisted by Gregory in 1908.

The manuscript was described by Henry Stevenson. Gregory saw it in 1886.

The manuscript was added to the list of New Testament manuscripts by Scrivener (697^{e}), Gregory (885^{e}).

Currently the manuscript is housed at the Vatican Library (Reg. gr. 5), in Rome.

== See also ==
- List of New Testament minuscules (1–1000)
- Biblical manuscript
- Textual criticism
- Minuscule 884
