= Minuscule 822 =

- New Testament manuscript
- Text: Gospel of Matthew
- Date: 12th century
- Script: Greek
- Now at: Biblioteca Nacional de España
- Size: 30.4 cm by 21.3 cm
- Type: ?
- Category: none
- Note: –

Minuscule 822 (in the Gregory-Aland numbering), N^{μ22} (von Soden), is a 12th-century Greek minuscule manuscript of the New Testament on parchment, with a commentary.

== Description ==
The codex contains the text of the Gospel of Matthew, with a commentary, on 281 parchment leaves (size 30.4 cm by 21.3 cm), with some lacunae.

The text is written in one column per page, 28 lines per page.

According to C. R. Gregory it contains a catena to the Gospel of Mark.

== Text ==
The Greek text of the codex Kurt Aland did not place in any Category.

== History ==
The manuscript is presently assigned to the 12th century on palaeographic grounds by the Institute for New Testament Textual Research.

It was added to the list of New Testament manuscripts by Gregory (822^{e}).

The manuscript is now housed at the Biblioteca Nacional de España (4739) in Madrid.

== See also ==
- List of New Testament minuscules
- Biblical manuscript
- Textual criticism
- Minuscule 821
