= Minuscule 862 =

- New Testament manuscript
- Text: Gospel of John
- Date: 12th century
- Script: Greek
- Now at: Vatican Library
- Size: 27 cm by 22.9 cm
- Type: Byzantine text-type
- Category: V
- Note: commentary

Minuscule 862 (in the Gregory-Aland numbering), Θ^{ε29} (von Soden), is a 12th-century Greek minuscule manuscript of the New Testament on parchment. The manuscript has complex context, but without marginalia.

== Description ==
The codex contains the text of the Gospel of John on 402 parchment leaves (size 27 cm by 22.9 cm), with a catena. The text is written in one column per page, 24 lines per page. The biblical text is surrounded by a catena, the commentary is of Theophylact's authorship.

== Text ==
The Greek text of the codex is a representative of the Byzantine text-type. Kurt Aland placed it in Category V.

== History ==
F. H. A. Scrivener and C. R. Gregory dated the manuscript to the 12th century. Currently the manuscript is dated by the INTF to the 12th century.

The name of scribe was Arsenius.

The manuscript was added to the list of New Testament manuscripts by Scrivener (675^{e}) and Gregory (862^{e}). Gregory saw it in 1886.

Currently the manuscript is housed at the Vatican Library (Gr. 1191), in Rome.

== See also ==
- List of New Testament minuscules
- Biblical manuscript
- Textual criticism
- Minuscule 861
- Minuscule 863
