= Minuscule 869 =

12th-century Greek minuscule manuscript of the New Testament

- New Testament manuscript
- Text: Gospel of John †
- Date: 12th century
- Script: Greek
- Now at: Vatican Library
- Size: 28 cm by 22 cm
- Type: Byzantine text-type
- Category: V
- Note: commentary

Minuscule 869 (in the Gregory-Aland numbering), C^{ι21} (von Soden), is a 12th-century Greek minuscule manuscript of the New Testament on paper, with a commentary. The manuscript has no complex context.

== Description ==
The codex contains the text of the Gospel of John (6:20-11:57) on 245 paper leaves (size 28 cm by 22 cm), with one lacuna. The text is written in one column per page, 25 lines per page. The biblical text is surrounded by a catena.

The text is divided according to the κεφαλαια (chapters), whose numbers are given at the margin, and the τιτλοι (titles of chapters) at the top of the pages.

== Text ==
Kurt Aland did not place the Greek text of the codex in any Category.

== History ==
F. H. A. Scrivener dated the manuscript to the 11th or 12th century, C. R. Gregory dated it to the 12th century. Currently the manuscript is dated by the INTF to the 17th century.

The manuscript was added to the list of New Testament manuscripts by Scrivener (684^{e}) and Gregory (869^{e}). Gregory saw it in 1886.

Currently the manuscript is housed at the Vatican Library (Gr. 1996), in Rome.

== See also ==
- List of New Testament minuscules
- Biblical manuscript
- Textual criticism
- Minuscule 868
- Minuscule 870
