= Minuscule 864 =

- New Testament manuscript
- Text: Gospels †
- Date: 14th century
- Script: Greek
- Now at: Vatican Library
- Size: 16.6 cm by 11.1 cm
- Type: Byzantine text-type
- Category: V
- Note: marginalia

Minuscule 864 (in the Gregory-Aland numbering) is a 14th-century Greek minuscule manuscript of the New Testament on paper. The manuscript has almost complete marginalia.

== Description ==
The codex contains the text of the four Gospels on 550 paper leaves (size 16.6 cm by 11.1 cm), with a catena. The text is written in one column per page, 14 lines per page.

The text is divided according to the κεφαλαια (chapters), whose numbers are given at the margin of the text, and their τιτλοι (titles) at the top of the pages. There is also a division according to the smaller Ammonian Sections (in Mark 235, 16:9), without references to the Eusebian Canons.

It contains tables of the κεφαλαια (tables of contents) before each Gospel, lectionary markings at the margin (for church reading), subscriptions at the end of each of the Gospels, and stichoi. Synaxarion and Menologion were added in the 15th century.

== Text ==
The Greek text of the codex is a representative of the Byzantine text-type. Hermann von Soden classified it to the textual family K^{x}. Kurt Aland the Greek text of the codex placed in Category V. According to the Claremont Profile Method it represents textual family K^{x} in Luke 1 and Luke 20. It creates also a textual pair with minuscule 1609. In Luke 10 no profile was made.

== History ==
C. R. Gregory dated the manuscript to the 14th century. Currently the manuscript is dated by the INTF to the 14th century.

The manuscript once belonged to the Cardinal Antonio Carafa.

The manuscript was added to the list of New Testament manuscripts by Gregory (864^{e}). Gregory saw it in 1886.

Currently the manuscript is housed at the Vatican Library (Gr. 1253), in Rome.

== See also ==
- List of New Testament minuscules
- Biblical manuscript
- Textual criticism
- Minuscule 863
- Minuscule 865
