= Minuscule 854 =

13th-century Greek manuscript of the New Testament

- New Testament manuscript
- Text: Gospels
- Date: 1286
- Script: Greek
- Now at: Vatican Library
- Size: 25.4 cm by 16.8 cm
- Type: Byzantine / mixed
- Category: none
- Note: commentary

Minuscule 854 (in the Gregory-Aland numbering), Θ^{ε39} (von Soden), is a 13th-century Greek minuscule manuscript of the New Testament on paper. The manuscript has complex content.

== Description ==
The codex contains the text of the four Gospels on 467 paper leaves (size 25.4 cm by 16.8 cm). The text is written in one column per page, 28 lines per page.

It contains a commentary of Theophylact's authorship.

== Text ==
The Greek text of the codex is a representative of the Byzantine text-type with a mixture of other text-types. Kurt Aland did not place it in any Category.

According to the Claremont Profile Method it represents textual cluster 2148 in Luke 1 and Luke 20. In Luke 10 it represents textual family K^{x}.

== History ==
According to the colophon the manuscript was written in 1286.

The manuscript was added to the list of New Testament manuscripts by F. H. A. Scrivener (666^{e}) and C. R. Gregory (854^{e}). Gregory saw it in 1886.

Currently the manuscript is housed at the Vatican Library (Gr. 641), in Rome.

== See also ==
- List of New Testament minuscules
- Biblical manuscript
- Textual criticism

Similar manuscripts

- Minuscule 855
- Minuscule 856
