= Minuscule 810 =

- New Testament manuscript
- Text: Gospels
- Date: 11th century
- Script: Greek
- Now at: ?
- Size: ? cm by ? cm
- Type: ?
- Category: none
- Note: –

Minuscule 810 (in the Gregory-Aland numbering) is a Greek minuscule manuscript of the New Testament written on parchment. Palaeographically it has been assigned to the 11th century. The manuscript has been lost.

== Description ==
The codex contains the text of the four Gospels, on 104 parchment leaves (size ? cm by ? cm).

== Text ==
Kurt Aland the Greek text of the codex did not place in any Category.

It was not examined according to the Claremont Profile Method.

== History ==
According to Gregory the manuscript was written in the 11th century.

It was added to the list of New Testament manuscripts by Gregory (810^{e}).

According to Gregory it belonged to one woman who lived in Athens on the street Οικονομου 6. The actual owner of the manuscript is unknown and the place of its housing is unknown.

== See also ==
- List of New Testament minuscules
- Biblical manuscript
- Textual criticism
- Minuscule 809
