= Minuscule 849 =

- New Testament manuscript
- Text: Gospel of John
- Date: 17th century
- Script: Greek
- Now at: Vatican Library
- Size: 27.5 cm by 20.5 cm
- Type: mixed text-type / Alexandrian
- Category: III
- Note: commentary

Minuscule 849 (in the Gregory-Aland numbering), Κ^{ι60} (von Soden), is a 17th-century Greek minuscule manuscript of the New Testament on paper. The manuscript has no complex context.

== Description ==
The codex contains the text of the Gospel of John (7:25-10:18) on 152 paper leaves (size 27.5 cm by 20.5 cm), with a catena. The text is written in one column per page, 21 lines per page. The biblical text is surrounded by a catena, the commentary is of Cyril's authorship.

== Text ==
The Greek text of the codex is a mixture of the text-types. Kurt Aland the Greek text of the codex placed in Category III.

== History ==
F. H. A. Scrivener and C. R. Gregory dated the manuscript to the 17th century. Currently the manuscript is dated by the INTF to the 17th century.

Probably it was rewritten from minuscule 850 (12th century).

The manuscript was added to the list of New Testament manuscripts by Scrivener (730^{e}) and Gregory (849^{e}). Gregory saw it in 1886.

Currently the manuscript is housed at the Vatican Library (Barb. gr. 495), in Rome.

== See also ==
- List of New Testament minuscules
- Biblical manuscript
- Textual criticism
