= Minuscule 890 =

- New Testament manuscript
- Name: Gr. Z. 31 (321)
- Text: Gospels
- Date: 14th century
- Script: Greek
- Now at: Biblioteca Marciana
- Size: 42 cm by 31 cm
- Type: Byzantine
- Category: V

Minuscule 890 (in the Gregory-Aland numbering), Θ^{ε426} (von Soden), is a 14th-century Greek minuscule manuscript of the New Testament on paper, with a commentary. It was prepared for liturgical use.

== Description ==
The codex contains the text of the four Gospels, with a commentary, on 397 paper leaves (size 42 cm by 31 cm). The text is written in two columns per page, 38 lines per page. The commentary is of Theophylact's authorship. After biblical books it has liturgical books with hagiographies: Synaxarion and Menologion.

The text of the Gospels is divided according to the κεφαλαια (chapters), whose numbers are given at the margin. There are no τιτλοι (titles of chapters) at the top of the pages. It contains tables of κεφαλαια (tables of contents) before each Gospel, lectionary markings at the margin (for liturgical use), and subscriptions with numbers of στιχοι at the end of each Gospel.

== Text ==
The Greek text of the codex is a representative of the Byzantine. Kurt Aland placed it in Category V. It was not examined according to the Claremont Profile Method. It contains the text of the Pericope Adulterae.

== History ==
According to C. R. Gregory it was written in the 14th century. Currently the manuscript is dated by the INTF to the 14th century. The manuscript once belonged to Cardinal Bessarion, who presented it to the city of Venice. Currently the manuscript is housed at the Biblioteca Marciana (Gr. Z. 31 (321)), in Venice.

The manuscript was added to the list of New Testament manuscripts by Scrivener (890^{e}) and Gregory (890^{e}). Gregory saw it in 1886. It is not cited in critical editions of the Greek New Testament (UBS4, NA28).

== See also ==
- List of New Testament minuscules (1–1000)
- Biblical manuscript
- Textual criticism
- Minuscule 889
- Minuscule 891
