= Minuscule 874 =

- New Testament manuscript
- Name: Cod. Vaticanus 2187
- Text: Gospel of John
- Date: 13th century
- Script: Greek
- Now at: Vatican Library
- Size: 28.5 cm by 19.7 cm
- Type: Byzantine?
- Category: none

Minuscule 874 (in the Gregory-Aland numbering), Θ^{ε 307} (von Soden), is a 13th-century Greek minuscule manuscript of the New Testament on parchment, with a commentary.

It was formerly known as Codex Columnensis 26.

== History ==
F. H. A. Scrivener dated the manuscript to the 12th or 13th century, C. R. Gregory dated it to the 12th century. Currently the manuscript is dated by the INTF to the 13th century.

The manuscript was added to the list of New Testament manuscripts by Scrivener (691^{e}), Gregory (874^{e}). Gregory saw it in 1886.

Currently the manuscript is housed at the Vatican Library (Gr. 2187), in Rome.

== Description ==
The codex contains the text of the Gospel of John with a commentary of Theophylact on 383 parchment leaves (size 28.5 cm by 19.7 cm). The text is written in one column per page, 27 lines per page.

== Text ==
Kurt Aland did not place the Greek text of the codex in any Category.

== See also ==
- List of New Testament minuscules
- Biblical manuscript
- Textual criticism
- Minuscule 873
