= Minuscule 813 =

- New Testament manuscript
- Text: Gospels †
- Date: 12th century
- Script: Greek
- Now at: ?
- Size: 17.7 cm by 12.3 cm
- Type: ?
- Category: none
- Note: –

Minuscule 813 (in the Gregory-Aland numbering), is a Greek minuscule manuscript of the New Testament written on parchment. Palaeographically it had been assigned to the 12th century.

== Description ==
The codex contains the text of the four Gospels, on 70 (?) parchment leaves (size 17.7 cm by 12.3 cm). According to Gregory the manuscript contained texts of: Matthew 27:14-30; 28:1-18; Mark 7:31-16:20; Luke 1:1-12:6.

The text is written in one column per page, 27 lines per page.

The text is divided according to the κεφαλαια (chapters), whose numbers are given at the margin, with their τιτλοι (titles of chapters) at the top of the pages. There is also another division according to the Ammonian Sections (in Mark 237 Sections, the last section in 16,14), with references to the Eusebian Canons (written below Ammonian Sections numbers).

It contained Prolegomena of Cosmas, tables of the κεφαλαια (tables of contents) before each of the Gospels, and subscriptions at the end of each of the Gospels.

The textual character of the codex is unknown because no one examined its readings.

== History ==
The manuscript was dated by Gregory to the 12th century.

The manuscript was found in Corfu by Gregory in 1886. It belonged to Archbishop Eustathius.

It was added to the list of New Testament manuscripts by Gregory (813^{e}).

The manuscript has been lost. Actual owner of the manuscript and place of its housing is unknown.

== See also ==
- List of New Testament minuscules
- Biblical manuscript
- Textual criticism
- Minuscule 811
- Minuscule 814
