= Minuscule 866 =

- New Testament manuscript
- Text: Gospel of Matthew
- Date: 16th century
- Script: Greek
- Now at: Vatican Library
- Size: 22.6 cm by 15 cm
- Type: Byzantine text-type
- Category: V

Minuscule 866 (in the Gregory-Aland numbering), ε405 (von Soden), is a 16th-century Greek minuscule manuscript of the New Testament on paper. The manuscript has no complex context, and some marginalia.

== Description ==
The codex contains the text of the Gospel of Matthew (7:25-10:40) on 7 paper leaves (size 22.6 cm by 15 cm), with a catena. It has some lacunae. The text is written in one column per page, 26 lines per page.

The text is divided according to the κεφαλαια (chapters), whose numbers are given at the margin of the text, but without their τιτλοι (titles) at the top of the pages. It contains lectionary markings at the margin (for Church reading), and αναγνωσεις (lessons).

== Text ==
The Greek text of the codex is a representative of the Byzantine text-type. Kurt Aland placed it in Category V.

== History ==
C. R. Gregory dated the manuscript to the 14th century. Currently the manuscript is dated by the INTF to the 16th century.

The manuscript was added to the list of New Testament manuscripts by Gregory (866^{e}). Gregory saw it in 1886. Formerly it was designated by 866a.

It was bound with some parts of another manuscripts. 4 leaves with text of Acts 6:17-13:2, in Greek and Latin, actually it is designated by 866b (Soden's α1375), and with minuscule 1918 from the 14th century, with text of Apocalypse.

Currently the manuscript is housed at the Vatican Library (Gr. 1882, fol. 10-16), in Rome.

== See also ==
- List of New Testament minuscules
- Biblical manuscript
- Textual criticism
- Minuscule 865
- Minuscule 867
