= Minuscule 821 =

- New Testament manuscript
- Text: Gospel of John
- Date: 16th century
- Script: Greek
- Now at: Biblioteca Nacional de España
- Size: 35 cm by 23.7 cm
- Type: ?
- Category: none
- Note: –

Minuscule 821 (in the Gregory-Aland numbering), C^{ι60} (von Soden), is a 16th-century Greek minuscule manuscript of the New Testament on paper, with a commentary.

== Description ==
The codex contains the text of the Gospel of John, with a commentary, on 281 paper leaves (size 35 cm by 23.7 cm).

The text is written in one column per page, 30 lines per page.

The same manuscript contains also a catena to the Book of Genesis (folios 1-261).

== Text ==
Kurt Aland did not place the Greek text of the codex in any Category.

== History ==
C. R. Gregory dated the manuscript to the 16th century. It has been assigned to the 16th century on palaeographic grounds by the Institute for New Testament Textual Research.

It was added to the list of New Testament manuscripts by Gregory (821^{e}).

The manuscript is housed at the Biblioteca Nacional de España (4673, fol. 262-542) in Madrid.

== See also ==
- List of New Testament minuscules
- Biblical manuscript
- Textual criticism
- Minuscule 822
- Minuscule 823
