= Minuscule 860 =

- New Testament manuscript
- Text: Matthew, Mark, Luke †
- Date: 12th/13th century
- Script: Greek
- Now at: Vatican Library
- Size: 20 cm by 15 cm
- Type: Byzantine text-type
- Category: V

Minuscule 860 (in the Gregory-Aland numbering), ε201 (von Soden), is a 12th-century Greek minuscule manuscript of the New Testament on parchment. The manuscript has not survived in complex context.

== Description ==
The codex contains the text of the three first Gospels Matthew, Mark, and Luke (1:1-24:27) on 144 parchment leaves (size 20 cm by 15 cm). The text is written in one column per page, 27 lines per page. The ending of Luke (24:27-53) and Gospel of John were lost. The first 17 leaves originally belonged to the other manuscript.

The text is divided according to the Ammonian Sections, whose numbers are given at the margin (rarely), but references to the Eusebian Canons are absent. It contains lectionary markings at the margin, incipits, and pictures. The manuscript is ornamented.

== Text ==
The Greek text of the codex is a representative of the Byzantine text-type. Kurt Aland placed it in Category V. According to the Claremont Profile Method it represents textual family K^{x} in Luke 10 and Luke 20. In Luke 1 it has mixed text. It creates a textual pair with minuscule 2108.

== History ==
Gregory dated the manuscript to the 12th century. Currently the manuscript is dated by the INTF to the 12th or 13th century.

The manuscript was added to the list of New Testament manuscripts by Gregory (860^{e}). Gregory saw it in 1886. Scrivener did not list this manuscript.

Currently the manuscript is housed at the Vatican Library (Gr. 774, fol. 17–160), in Rome.

== See also ==
- List of New Testament minuscules
- Biblical manuscript
- Textual criticism
- Minuscule 859
- Minuscule 861
