= Minuscule 850 =

- New Testament manuscript
- Text: Gospel of John
- Date: 12th century
- Script: Greek
- Now at: Vatican Library
- Size: 28.3 cm by 20.8 cm
- Type: Alexandrian text-type / mixed
- Category: none
- Note: commentary

Minuscule 850 (in the Gregory-Aland numbering), Κ^{ι20} (von Soden), is a 12th-century Greek minuscule manuscript of the New Testament on parchment. The manuscript has no complex content.

== Description ==
The codex contains the text of the Gospel of John (7:25-10:18) on 381 parchment leaves (size 28.3 cm by 20.8 cm), with a catena. The text is written in one column per page, 21 lines per page. The biblical text is surrounded by a catena, the commentary is of Cyril's authorship.

== Text ==
The Greek text of the codex is a representative of the Alexandrian text-type. Kurt Aland did not place the Greek text of the codex in any Category.

== History ==
F. H. A. Scrivener dated the manuscript to the 10th century, C. R. Gregory dated it to the 12th century. Currently the manuscript is dated by the INTF to the 12th century.

The manuscript once belonged to the Jesuits' Collegium in Paris as a gift from Octavio Bulgarini. Then it belonged to Barberini. Minuscule 849 (17th century) probably was rewritten from this manuscript.

The manuscript was added to the list of New Testament manuscripts by Scrivener (729^{e}) and Gregory (850^{e}). Gregory saw it in 1886.

Currently the manuscript is housed at the Vatican Library (Barb. gr. 504), in Rome.

== See also ==
- List of New Testament minuscules
- Biblical manuscript
- Textual criticism
