= Minuscule 882 =

- New Testament manuscript
- Name: Cod. Palat. gr. 32
- Text: Gospel of John
- Date: 10th century
- Script: Greek
- Now at: Vatican Library
- Size: 36.5 cm by 26.7 cm
- Type: Byzantine
- Category: none

Minuscule 882 (in the Gregory-Aland numbering) is a 10th-century Greek minuscule manuscript of the New Testament on paper. It has complex contents.

== Description ==
The codex contains the text of the Gospel of John, with a commentary, on 181 paper leaves (size 36.5 cm by 26.7 cm). The text is written in two columns per page, 32 lines per page. The commentary is of John Chrysostom. It was written by two scribes, one hand wrote Homilies, another biblical text.

== Text ==
The Greek text of the codex Kurt Aland did not place it in any Category. It was not examined by the Claremont Profile Method.

== History ==
According to F. H. A. Scrivener it was written in the 9th or 10th century, according to C. R. Gregory in the 10th century. Currently the manuscript is dated by the INTF to the 10th century.

The manuscript was added to the list of New Testament manuscripts by Scrivener (713^{e}), Gregory (882^{e}). Gregory saw it in 1886.

Currently the manuscript is housed at the Vatican Library (Palat. gr. 32), in Rome.

== See also ==
- List of New Testament minuscules (1–1000)
- Biblical manuscript
- Textual criticism
- Minuscule 881
