= Minuscule 870 =

- New Testament manuscript
- Name: Cod. Vaticanus 2115
- Text: Gospel of Luke †
- Date: 11th century
- Script: Greek
- Now at: Vatican Library
- Size: 18.2 cm by 12.8 cm
- Type: Byzantine text-type
- Category: V
- Note: marginalia

Minuscule 870 (in the Gregory-Aland numbering), ε 104 (von Soden), is an 11th-century Greek minuscule manuscript of the New Testament on paper, with a commentary. The manuscript has no complex content. It has marginalia and was prepared for liturgical use.

== Description ==
The codex contains only the text of the Gospel of Luke (11:5-16:14) on 14 paper leaves (size 18.2 cm by 12.8 cm). The text is written in one column per page, 23-24 lines per page.

The text is divided according to the κεφαλαια (chapters), whose numbers are given at the margin, but there is no τιτλοι (titles of chapters) at the top of the pages. There is also a division according to the smaller Ammonian Sections, but without references to the Eusebian Canons. It contains lectionary markings at the margin for liturgical reading.

== Text ==
The Greek text of the codex is a representative of the Byzantine text-type. Kurt Aland placed the text of the codex in Category V. It was not examined by the Claremont Profile Method.

== History ==
C. R. Gregory dated the manuscript to the 11th century. Currently the manuscript is dated by the INTF to the 11th century.

The manuscript was added to the list of New Testament manuscripts by Gregory (870^{e}). Gregory saw it in 1886.

Currently the manuscript is housed at the Vatican Library (Gr. 2115, fol. 166-179), in Rome.

== See also ==
- List of New Testament minuscules
- Biblical manuscript
- Textual criticism
- Minuscule 869
- Minuscule 871
