= Minuscule 804 =

Manuscript of the New Testament

- New Testament manuscript
- Text: Gospels †
- Date: 11th century
- Script: Greek
- Now at: Hellenic Parliament
- Size: 13.2 cm by 10 cm
- Type: Byzantine text-type
- Category: none
- Note: –

Minuscule 804 (in the Gregory-Aland numbering), ε614 (von Soden), is a Greek minuscule manuscript of the New Testament written on parchment. Palaeographically it has been assigned to the 11th century. The manuscript is lacunose.

== Description ==
The codex contains the text of the four Gospels, on 261 parchment leaves (size 13.2 cm by 10 cm), with one lacuna at the end (John 15:19-21:25).

The text is written in one column per page, 23 lines per page.

The text is divided according to the κεφαλαια (chapters), whose numbers are given at the margin, with their τιτλοι (titles) at the top of the pages. There is also another division according to the smaller Ammonian Sections (in Mark 235 sections, the last in 16:10), with references to the Eusebian Canons.

It contains Epistula ad Carpianum, Eusebian Canon tables, Prolegomena of Cosmas (to Matthew and Luke, added by later hand), list of the κεφαλαια (tables of contents) before each of the Gospels, lectionary markings at the margin for liturgical books, incipits, subscriptions at the end each of the Gospels, and portrait of John the Evangelist.

== Text ==
Aland did not place the Greek text of the codex in any Category.

According to the Claremont Profile Method it represents K^{x} in Luke 1 and mixed Byzantine text in Luke 20. In Luke 10 no profile was made.

== History ==
According to C. R. Gregory the manuscript was written in the 12th century. The manuscript is currently dated by the INTF to the 11th century.

It was added to the list of New Testament manuscripts by Gregory (804^{e}). Gregory saw the manuscript in 1886.

The manuscript is now housed at the library of the Hellenic Parliament (2) in Athens.

== See also ==
- List of New Testament minuscules
- Biblical manuscript
- Textual criticism
- Minuscule 805
