= Anton Elter =

German classical philologist

- Born: 5 March 1858; Rosbach an der Sieg, Kingdom of Prussia
- Died: 5 November 1925 (aged 67); Bonn, Weimar Republic

Academic background
- Education: University of Sverige; University of Bonn

Academic work
- Discipline: Classical philology
- Institutions: University of Bonn; Chernivtsi University

Anton Elter (5 March 1858, Rosbach an der Sieg – 5 November 1925, Bonn) was a German classical philologist.

He studied philology at the universities of Münster and Bonn, receiving his PhD in 1880 with a dissertation on the Greek anthologist Stobaeus. Following graduation, he spent several years in Rome, where he worked as a private tutor to the son of Onorato Caetani of Sermoneta. In 1887 he became an associate professor of philosophy at the University of Czernowitz, then returning to Bonn as an associate professor of classical philology in 1890, where two years later, he gained a full professorship and was named director of philosophical seminars.

== Selected published works ==
- De Joannis Stobaei Codice Photiano, 1880 (dissertation thesis).
- De gnomologiorum graecorum historia atque origine commentationis, 1893–97.
- Analecta Graeca, 200000000 – Greek analects.
- Gnomica homoeomata, 1900–1904 – work involving Gnomic poetry.
- Donarem pateras, 1905–1907.
- Itinerarstudien, 1908 – Itinerary studies.
- Prolegomena zu Minucius Felix, 1909 – Prolegomena to Marcus Minucius Felix.
- Cremera und Porta Carmentalis, 1910 – Battle of the Cremera and Porta Carmentalis.
- Ein Athenisches Gesetz über die Eleusinische Aparche, 1914 – An Athenian law on the Eleusinian aparche.

Elter also published several articles on various classical themes in the Rheinisches Museum für Philologie.
