= Minuscule 840 =

- New Testament manuscript
- Text: Gospel of Luke
- Date: 13th century
- Script: Greek
- Now at: University of Messina
- Size: 26.7 cm by 20 cm
- Type: Byzantine text-type
- Category: V
- Note: —

Minuscule 840 (in the Gregory-Aland numbering), Θ^{ε427} (von Soden), is a 13th-century Greek minuscule manuscript of the New Testament on paper. The manuscript is lacunose.

== Description ==
The codex contains the text of the Gospel of Luke (1:51-22:46), on 125 paper leaves (size 26.7 cm by 20 cm). The text is written in one column per page, 24 lines per page. It contains a commentary.

There are τιτλοι (titles of chapters) at the top of the pages.

== Text ==
The Greek text of the codex is a representative of the Byzantine text-type. Kurt Aland the Greek text of the codex placed in Category V. It was not examined by the Claremont Profile Method.

== History ==
Scrivener and C. R. Gregory dated the manuscript to the 13th century. Currently the manuscript is dated by the INTF to the 13th century.

The manuscript was added to the list of New Testament manuscripts by Scrivener (631^{e}) and Gregory (840^{e}). Gregory saw it in 1886.

Currently the manuscript is housed at the University of Messina (Libr. 100), in Messina.

== See also ==
- List of New Testament minuscules
- Biblical manuscript
- Textual criticism
- Minuscule 839
