= Minuscule 842 =

- New Testament manuscript
- Text: Gospel of Matthew †
- Date: 14th century
- Script: Greek
- Now at: Biblioteca Estense
- Size: 23 cm by 17 cm
- Type: ?
- Category: none
- Note: —

Minuscule 842 (in the Gregory-Aland numbering), Θ^{ε424} (von Soden), is a 15th-century Greek minuscule manuscript of the New Testament on parchment. The manuscript is lacunose.

== Description ==
The codex contains the text of the Gospel of Matthew (1:1-20:22; 21:41-60) on 88 parchment leaves (size 23 cm by 17 cm). The text is written in one column per page, 43 lines per page. It contains a commentary. The manuscript is ornamented.

== Text ==
Kurt Aland did not place the Greek text of the codex in any Category. It was not examined by the Claremont Profile Method.

== History ==
C. R. Gregory dated the manuscript to the 14th century. Currently the manuscript is dated by the INTF to the 14th century.

The manuscript was added to the list of New Testament manuscripts by Gregory (842^{e}). Gregory saw it in 1886.

Currently the manuscript is housed at the Biblioteca Estense (G. 128, a.W.9.26 (III D 9)), in Modena.

== See also ==
- List of New Testament minuscules
- Biblical manuscript
- Textual criticism
- Minuscule 841
