= Minuscule 811 =

Greek manuscript

- New Testament manuscript
- Text: Gospels
- Date: 13th century
- Script: Greek
- Now at: National Library of Greece
- Size: 23 cm by 16.5 cm
- Type: Byzantine text-type
- Category: V
- Note: –

Minuscule 811 (in the Gregory-Aland numbering), ε4005 (von Soden), is a Greek minuscule manuscript of the New Testament written on parchment. Palaeographically it has been assigned to the 13th century.

== Description ==
The codex contains the text of the four Gospels, on 289 parchment leaves (size 23 cm by 16.5 cm).

The text is written in one column per page, 23 lines per page.

Some parts of the Gospel of Matthew are on paper.

== Text ==
The Greek text of the codex is a representative of the Byzantine text-type. Aland placed it in Category V.

It was not examined by Hermann von Soden. According to the Claremont Profile Method it has mixed Byzantine text in Luke 1 and represents textual family K^{x} in Luke 20. In Luke 10 no profile was made. It is related to the textual cluster 1053 in Luke 1.

== History ==
The manuscript is currently dated by the INTF to the 13th century.

The scribe was Georgios, a priest. The manuscript was found in 1899. It came from Corfu, and was held in Biblical Archaeology Society in Athens.

It was added to the list of New Testament manuscripts by Gregory (811^{e}). Gregory did not see it.

The manuscript is now housed at the library of the National Library of Greece (2814) in Athens.

== See also ==
- List of New Testament minuscules
- Biblical manuscript
- Textual criticism
- Minuscule 809
