= Minuscule 872 =

- New Testament manuscript
- Name: Cod. Vaticanus 2160
- Text: Gospels †
- Date: 12th century
- Script: Greek
- Now at: Vatican Library
- Size: 21 cm by 16 cm
- Type: Byzantine/Caesarean text-type
- Category: none
- Note: marginalia

Minuscule 872 is Greek minuscule manuscript of the New Testament written on parchment. It is designated by the siglum 872 in the Gregory-Aland numbering of New Testament manuscripts, and ε203 in the von Soden numbering of New Testament manuscripts.It has full marginal notes. Using the study of comparative writing styles (paleography), it has been assigned to the 12th century.

== Description ==
The manuscript is a codex (precursor to the modern book format) containing the text of the four Gospels written on 180 parchment leaves (sized 21 cm by 16 cm), with some missing portions: Matthew 6:4-21; John 13:16-21:25. The text is written in two columns per page, 26 lines per page.

The text is divided according to the chapters (known as κεφαλαια / kephalaia), whose numbers are given in the margin, and their titles (known as τιτλοι / titloi) at the top of the pages. There is also a division according to the Ammonian Sections (in Mark 233 Sections, the last in 16:8), with references to the Eusebian Canons (both early divisions of the Gospels into comparable sections).

It contains the Epistle to Carpianus (a letter by the early church father Eusebius outlining his gospel division system), Prolegomena to John, tables of contents (also known as κεφαλαια) before each Gospel, lectionary markings in the margin (for liturgical reading); subscriptions at the end of each Gospel, with the numbers of lines (known as στιχοι / stichoi) and numbers of verses (in John); it contains portraits of the Evangelists placed before each Gospel.

== Text ==
The Greek text of the codex is considered to be of an eclectic/mixed character. Textual critic Hermann von Soden classified it to the textual family I^{ηb}. Biblical scholar Kurt Aland did not place it in any Category of his New Testament manuscripts classification system. According to the Claremont Profile Method (a specific analysis of textual data), it represents the textual family K^{x} in Luke 1, Luke 10, and Luke 20.

In the Gospel of Mark it represents the textual family ƒ^{1}.

== History ==
According to a note the manuscript once belonged to Emilio H. F. Alteri in Rome in 1871. The manuscript was added to the list of New Testament manuscripts by biblical scholar Frederick H. A. Scrivener (as 690^{e}), Gregory (872^{e}). Gregory saw it in 1886. Scrivener dated the manuscript to the 11th or 12th century. C. R. Gregory dated it to the 12th century. The manuscript is currently dated by the INTF to the 12th century. The manuscript is currently housed at the Vatican Library (shelf number Gr. 2160), in Rome.

== See also ==
- List of New Testament minuscules
- Biblical manuscript
- Textual criticism
- Minuscule 871
