= Minuscule 823 =

- New Testament manuscript
- Text: New Testament (except Apocalypse)
- Date: 13th century
- Script: Greek
- Now at: Biblioteka Jagiellońska
- Size: 18 cm by 13 cm
- Type: ?
- Category: none
- Note: –

Minuscule 823 (in the Gregory-Aland numbering), δ368 (von Soden), is a 13th-century Greek minuscule manuscript of the New Testament on parchment.

== Description ==
The codex contains the text of the New Testament, except Book of Revelation (Apocalypse), on 251 parchment leaves (size 18 cm by 13 cm). It contains also Book of Psalms and Hymns. The text of Matthew 1:1-3:9 was supplied by a later hand.

The text is written in one column per page, 35-39 lines per page. The letters are very small.

The text is divided according to the κεφαλαια (chapters), and according to the smaller Ammonian Sections (in Mark 234 sections, the last numbered section in 16:9). The numbers of the κεφαλαια are given at the margin, and their τιτλοι (titles) at the top of the pages. The numbers of the Ammonian Sections are given at the margin, but without references to the Eusebian Canons.

It contains 16 pictures. There is a space for the list of the Eusebian Canon tables.

The order of books is usual: Gospels, Book of Acts, Catholic epistles, and Pauline epistles.

== Text ==
Kurt Aland the Greek text of the codex did not place it in any Category.

It was not examined according to the Claremont Profile Method.

In 1 Corinthians 2:14 it reads πνευματος (omit του θεου) along with 2, 216, 255, 330, 440, 451, 1827, and syr^{p}.

== History ==
Gregory dated the manuscript to the 13th century. Currently the manuscript is dated by the INTF to the 13th century.

The manuscript was brought from Smyrna to Berlin. It was examined and described by Oscar von Gebhardt in 1886. It was added to the list of New Testament manuscripts by Gregory (823^{e}, 266^{a}, 315^{p}). Gregory saw it in 1889. In 1908 Gregory gave one siglum for it – 823.

It was housed in Berlin in the Preußische Königliche Bibliothek (then Prussian State Library, then Berlin State Library) with the shelf-number Gr. octavo 13.

The Prussian State Library sent many collections out of Berlin to be sheltered in Silesia for safekeeping during World War II. As the result of postwar border changes some of these collections were found in Poland (among them minuscule 823). They were moved to the Jagiellonian University Library.

Currently the manuscript is housed at the Biblioteka Jagiellońska (Fonds der Berliner Handschriften, Graec. octavo 13), in Kraków.

== See also ==
- List of New Testament minuscules
- Biblical manuscript
- Textual criticism
- Minuscule 821
