= Minuscule 809 =

- New Testament manuscript
- Text: Gospels
- Date: 11th century
- Script: Greek
- Now at: Hellenic Parliament
- Size: 24.5 cm by 20 cm
- Type: Byzantine text-type
- Category: V
- Note: –

Minuscule 809 (in the Gregory-Aland numbering), A^{149} (von Soden), is a Greek minuscule manuscript of the New Testament written on parchment. Palaeographically it has been assigned to the 11th century. The manuscript has complex contents.

== Description ==
The codex contains the text of the four Gospels, on 284 parchment leaves (size 24.5 cm by 20 cm).

The text is written in one column per page, 18-20 lines per page. The biblical text is surrounded by a catena.

The text is divided according to the κεφαλαια (chapters), whose numbers are given at the margin, with their τιτλοι (titles of chapters) at the top of the pages. There is also division according to the Ammonian Sections (in Mark 233, the last section in 16:8), with references to the Eusebian Canons.

It contains Epistula ad Carpianum, Eusebian Canon tables, Prolegomena, list of the κεφαλαια (tables of contents) before each of the Gospels, and αναγνωσεις.

== Text ==
The Greek text of the codex is a representative of the Byzantine text-type. Aland placed it in Category V.

It was not examined according to the Claremont Profile Method.

== History ==
According to Gregory the manuscript was written in the 11th century. The manuscript is currently dated by the INTF to the 11th century.

It was added to the list of New Testament manuscripts by Gregory (809^{e}). Gregory saw the manuscript in 1886.

The manuscript is now housed at the library of the National Library of Greece (2364) in Athens.

== See also ==
- List of New Testament minuscules
- Biblical manuscript
- Textual criticism
- Minuscule 808
