= Minuscule 841 =

- New Testament manuscript
- Text: Gospels †
- Date: 15th century
- Script: Greek
- Now at: Biblioteca Estense
- Size: 29.7 cm by 22.5 cm
- Type: Byzantine text-type
- Category: V
- Note: —

Minuscule 841 (in the Gregory-Aland numbering), Θ^{ε50} (von Soden), is a 15th-century Greek minuscule manuscript of the New Testament on paper. The manuscript is lacunose.

== Description ==
The codex contains the text of the Gospel of Mark, Gospel of Luke, and Gospel of John on 244 paper leaves (size 29.7 cm by 22.5 cm). The text is written in one column per page, 31-34 lines per page. It contains a commentary of Nicetas (abbreviated). The manuscript is ornamented.

== Text ==
The Greek text of the codex is a representative of the Byzantine text-type. Kurt Aland the Greek text of the codex placed in Category V. According to the Claremont Profile Method it has mixed text in Luke 1. In Luke 10 and Luke 20 it has a mixture of the Byzantine text-families.

== History ==
C. R. Gregory dated the manuscript to the 15th century. Currently the manuscript is dated by the INTF to the 15th century.

The manuscript was added to the list of New Testament manuscripts by Gregory (841^{e}). Gregory saw it in 1886, Gregory did not examine its text ("ich weiss nicht, ob der Text ganz ist").

Currently the manuscript is housed at the Biblioteca Estense (G. 178, a.V.7.24 (II F 13)), in Modena.

== See also ==
- List of New Testament minuscules
- Biblical manuscript
- Textual criticism
- Minuscule 842
