= Minuscule 803 =

- New Testament manuscript
- Text: Matthew, Mark, Luke
- Date: 16th century
- Script: Greek
- Now at: National Library of Greece
- Size: 22 cm by 15.5 cm
- Type: Byzantine text-type
- Category: none
- Note: –

Minuscule 803 (in the Gregory-Aland numbering), ε614 (von Soden), is a Greek minuscule manuscript of the New Testament written on paper. Palaeographically it has been assigned to the 16th century.

== Description ==
The codex contains the text of the three first Gospels (Matthew, Mark, Luke), on 215 paper leaves (size 22 cm by 15.5 cm).

The text is written in one column per page, 15-20 lines per page. According to Gregory it has 177 leaves, according to von Soden 176 leaves.

The text is divided according to the κεφαλαια (chapters), whose numbers are given at the margin, with their τιτλοι (titles) at the top of the pages (with a Harmony). There is also another division according to the smaller Ammonian Sections, but without a references to the Eusebian Canons.

It contains Prolegomena, list of the κεφαλαια (tables of contents) before the Gospel of Mark, lectionary markings at the margin, incipits, αναγνωσεις, subscriptions at the end each of the Gospels, and numbers of στιχοι in Matthew.

== Text ==
Kurt Aland the Greek text of the codex did not place in any Category.

It was not examined according to the Claremont Profile Method.

== History ==
According to C. R. Gregory the manuscript was written in the 16th century. The manuscript is currently dated by the INTF to the 16th century.

According to the subscription it once belonged to "Ananiou Hegoumenou".

It was added to the list of New Testament manuscripts by Gregory (803^{e}). Gregory saw the manuscript in 1886.

The manuscript is now housed at the National Library of Greece (88) in Athens.

== See also ==
- List of New Testament minuscules
- Biblical manuscript
- Textual criticism
- Minuscule 802
- Minuscule 808
