= Minuscule 893 =

- New Testament manuscript
- Name: Gr. I,61 (1201)
- Text: Gospel of Matthew
- Date: 12th century
- Script: Greek
- Now at: Biblioteca Marciana
- Size: 25.5 cm by 19.5 cm
- Type: Byzantine
- Category: V

Minuscule 893 (in the Gregory-Aland numbering), Ν^{μ2} (von Soden), is a 12th-century Greek minuscule manuscript of the New Testament on paper, with a commentary. It was prepared for liturgical use.

== Description ==
The codex contains the text of the Gospel of Matthew, with a commentary, on 484 paper leaves (size 25.5 cm by 19.5 cm). The text is written in one column per page, 21 lines per page. The manuscript was damaged by humidity.

It contains tables of the κεφαλαια (lists of contents) before the Gospel.

== Text ==
The Greek text of the codex is a representative of the Byzantine. Kurt Aland placed it in Category V.

== History ==
According to C. R. Gregory it was written in the 12th century. Currently the manuscript is dated by the INTF to the 12th century.

It was once held in S. Michael in Muriano.

The manuscript was added to the list of New Testament manuscripts by Gregory (893^{e}).

It is not cited in critical editions of the Greek New Testament (UBS4, NA28).

Currently the manuscript is housed at the Biblioteca Marciana (Gr. I,61 (1201)), in Venice.

== See also ==
- List of New Testament minuscules (1–1000)
- Biblical manuscript
- Textual criticism
- Minuscule 891
