= Minuscule 891 =

- New Testament manuscript
- Name: Gr. Z. 32 (689)
- Text: Gospels, Paul †
- Date: 14th century
- Script: Greek
- Now at: Biblioteca Marciana
- Size: 34.5 cm by 24.5 cm
- Type: Byzantine
- Category: none
- Note: marginalia

Minuscule 891 (in the Gregory-Aland numbering), Θ^{ε427} (von Soden), is a 14th-century Greek minuscule manuscript of the New Testament on paper, with a commentary. It has not survived in complete condition.

== Description ==
The codex contains the text of the four Gospels and the Pauline epistles, with a commentary, on 474 paper leaves (size 34.5 cm by 24.5 cm). The text is written in one column per page, 42 lines per page.

The text of the Gospels is divided according to the κεφαλαια (chapters), whose numbers are given at the margin. There are no τιτλοι (titles of chapters) at the top of the pages. It has not Epistle to the Hebrews.

== Text ==
The Greek Kurt Aland did not placed in any Category.

It was not examined according to the Claremont Profile Method.

It contains the text of the Pericope Adulterae.

== History ==
According to C. R. Gregory it was written in the 14th century. Currently the manuscript is dated by the INTF to the 14th century.

Gregory saw it in 1886.

The manuscript was added to the list of New Testament manuscripts by Gregory (891^{e} 318^{p}). In 1908 Gregory gave the number 891 to it.

It is not cited in critical editions of the Greek New Testament (UBS4, NA28).

Currently the manuscript is housed at the Biblioteca Marciana (Gr. Z. 32 (689)), in Venice.

== See also ==
- List of New Testament minuscules (1–1000)
- Biblical manuscript
- Textual criticism
- Minuscule 890
- Minuscule 893
