= Minuscule 898 =

- New Testament manuscript
- Text: Gospels †
- Date: 13th century
- Script: Greek
- Found: 1869
- Now at: Edinburgh University Library; Historical Museum of Crete
- Size: 19.4 cm by 14.3 cm
- Type: Byzantine
- Category: V
- Note: marginalia

Minuscule 898 (in the Gregory-Aland numbering), ε362 (von Soden), is a 13th-century Greek minuscule manuscript of the New Testament on parchment. It has marginalia. The manuscript has not survived in complete condition.

== Description ==
The codex contains the text of the four Gospels, on 97 parchment leaves (size 19.4 cm by 14.3 cm), with some lacunae. The text is written in one column per page, 28 lines per page. It contains also liturgical books with hagiographies: Synaxarion and Menologion.

It has numerous lacunae in the Gospel of Matthew, Luke, and John. Only Gospel of Mark is complete.

The text of the Gospels is divided according to the Ammonian Sections (in Mark 236 sections, the last section in Mark 16:14), whose numbers are given at the margin. There is no references to the Eusebian Canons.

It contains subscriptions at the end of each of the Gospels. Lectionary markings at the margin (for liturgical use) were added by a later hand.

== Text ==
The Greek text of the codex is a representative of the Byzantine. Kurt Aland placed it in Category V.

According to the Claremont Profile Method it represents the textual family K^{x} in Luke 10, in Luke 1 it has a mixture of Byzantine textual families, in Luke 20 no profile was made because the manuscript is defective. The manuscript has also some lacunae in Luke 1 and Luke 10. It has some textual relationship to Codex Campianus.

== History ==
According to C. R. Gregory it was written in the 13th century. Currently the manuscript is dated by the INTF to the 13th century. It was bought by David Laing in 1869. Gregory saw it in 1883.

The manuscript was added to the list of New Testament manuscripts by Gregory (898^{e}). It was not on the Scrivener's list, but it was added to his list by Edward Miller in the 4th edition of A Plain Introduction to the Criticism of the New Testament.

It is not cited in critical editions of the Greek New Testament (UBS4, NA28).

79 leaves of the manuscript is housed at the Edinburgh University Library (Ms. 221 (D Laing 667)), in Edinburgh and 18 leaves Historical Museum of Crete (no shelf number).

== See also ==
- Biblical manuscript
- List of New Testament minuscules (1–1000)
- Textual criticism
