= Minuscule 858 =

- New Testament manuscript
- Text: Gospels, Paul
- Date: 14th century
- Script: Greek
- Now at: Vatican Library
- Size: 34.2 cm by 24.5 cm 30 cm by 21.5 cm
- Type: Byzantine text-type
- Category: V
- Note: commentary

Minuscule 858 (in the Gregory-Aland numbering), Θ^{ε423} (von Soden), is a 14th-century Greek minuscule manuscript of the New Testament on paper. The manuscript has complex content.

== Description ==
The codex contains the text of the four Gospels and the Pauline epistles on 588 paper leaves (size 34.2 cm by 24.5 cm in the Gospels, 30 cm by 21.5 cm in the Pauline epistles). The text of the Gospels is written in one column per page, 48 lines per page. The text of the Pauline epistles is written in one column per page, and 24 lines per page.

It contains a commentary of Theophylact's authorship.

== Text ==
The Greek text of the codex is a representative of the Byzantine text-type. Kurt Aland placed it in any Category V.

It was not examined by the Claremont Profile Method.

== History ==
F. H. A. Scrivener dated the manuscript to the 15th century, C. R. Gregory dated it to the 14th century. Currently the manuscript is dated by the INTF to the 14th century.

The manuscript was added to the list of New Testament manuscripts by Scrivener (671^{e}) and Gregory (858^{e}). Gregory saw it in 1886.

Currently the manuscript is housed at the Vatican Library (Gr. 647), in Rome.

== See also ==
- List of New Testament minuscules
- Biblical manuscript
- Textual criticism
- Minuscule 857
- Minuscule 859
