= Minuscule 884 =

- New Testament manuscript
- Name: Cod. Regin. grec. 3
- Text: Luke-John
- Date: 11th century
- Script: Greek
- Now at: Vatican Library
- Size: 35.3 cm by 26.5 cm
- Type: Byzantine
- Category: V

Minuscule 884 (in the Gregory-Aland numbering), A^{126} (von Soden), is an 11th-century Greek minuscule manuscript of the New Testament on parchment. The manuscript has not survived in complete condition.

== Description ==
The codex contains the text of the Gospel of Luke and Gospel of John, with a commentary, on 256 parchment leaves (size 35.3 cm by 26.5 cm), with lacuna in Luke 1:1-3:1. The text is written in one column per page, 30 lines per page. The commentary is of Theophylact of Ohrid. It was altered by a later hand (biblical text and a commentary).

== Text ==
The Greek text of the codex is a representative of the Byzantine text-type. Hermann von Soden classified it to the textual family I^{β}. It means, it has some textual affinities to 1216 and minuscule 16. Kurt Aland placed it in Category V.

According to the Claremont Profile Method it represents the textual family K^{x} in Luke 10. In Luke 20 it belongs to the textual family of Lake's group, as a weak member. In Luke 1 no profile was made, because the manuscript is defective.

== History ==
According to F. H. A. Scrivener it was written in the 13th century, according to C. R. Gregory in the 11th century. Currently the manuscript is dated by the INTF to the 11th century.

The manuscript was added to the list of New Testament manuscripts by Scrivener (696^{e}), Gregory (884^{e}). Gregory saw it in 1886.

It was described by Henry Stevenson.

Currently the manuscript is housed at the Vatican Library (Reg. gr. 3), in Rome.

== See also ==
- List of New Testament minuscules (1–1000)
- Biblical manuscript
- Textual criticism
- Minuscule 883
