= Minuscule 2277 =

- New Testament manuscript
- Text: Gospels
- Date: 11th century
- Script: Greek
- Now at: British Library
- Size: 21.5 cm by 16.5 cm
- Type: Byzantine text-type
- Category: V
- Note: –

Minuscule 2277 (in the Gregory-Aland numbering), is a Greek minuscule manuscript of the New Testament written on parchment. Palaeographically it has been assigned to the 11th century. Gregory catalogued it twice as 816 and 2277.

== Description ==
The codex contains the text of the four Gospels, on 259 parchment leaves (size 21.5 cm by 16.5 cm). John 18:34-19:6; 21:13-25 was supplied by later hand. The large initial letters are written in red, all capital letters are written in colour.

The text is written in one column per page, 20-22 lines per page.

The text is divided according to the κεφαλαια (chapters), whose numbers are given at the margin, with their τιτλοι (titles) at the top of the pages. There is also another division according to the Ammonian Sections (in Mark 233 sections, the last section ends in 16:8), whose numbers are given at the margin, with references to the Eusebian Canons.

It contains Eusebian Canon tables, list of the κεφαλαια (lists of contains) before each Gospel, and subscriptions at the end of each Gospel.

== Text ==
The Greek text of the codex is a representative of the Byzantine text-type. Aland placed it in Category V.

It was not examined by Hermann von Soden. According to the Claremont Profile Method it has mixed Byzantine text and represents textual family K^{x} in Luke 1 and Luke 10. In Luke 20 it belongs to cluster 1519. In Luke 1 and 10 it belongs to cluster 2592.

It contains the Pericope Adulterae (John 7:53-8:11) without any mark.

== History ==
Gregory dated the manuscript to the 12th century. The manuscript is currently dated by the INTF to the 11th century.

It was held in Corfu, then it came to the "Dawes Collection" (as first volume; second volume belonged to 2278, the third to 2279). On 15 October 1904 it was bought for the British Museum.

It was added to the list of New Testament manuscripts by Gregory (816^{e}). Gregory saw it 18 May 1886 during his visit in Greece.

On 17 October 1904 Gregory saw this manuscript in the British Museum and catalogued again under the siglum 2277. This time he assigned age of the manuscript for the 11th century. Second description is more detailed.

Kurt Aland recognized that numbers 816 and 2277 belongs to the same manuscript and number 816 was deleted from the list; number 2277 is used as siglum for this manuscript.

The manuscript is now housed at the British Library (Add MS 37001) in London.

== See also ==
- List of New Testament minuscules
- Biblical manuscript
- Textual criticism
- Minuscule 2276
- Minuscule 2278
