= Minuscule 839 =

- New Testament manuscript
- Text: Gospels
- Date: 14th century
- Script: Greek
- Now at: University of Messina
- Size: 26.5 cm by 21.2 cm
- Type: Byzantine text-type
- Category: V
- Note: —

Minuscule 839 (in the Gregory-Aland numbering), ε427 (von Soden), is a 14th-century Greek minuscule manuscript of the New Testament on parchment. The manuscript is not lacunose and good preserved.

== Description ==
The codex contains the text of the four Gospels, on 246 parchment leaves (size 26.5 cm by 21.2 cm). The text is written in one column per page, 22 lines per page.

The text is divided according to the κεφαλαια (chapters), whose numbers are given at the margin, and their τιτλοι (titles) at the top of the pages. There is also another division according to the smaller Ammonian Sections (in mark 241, 16:20), with references to the Eusebian Canons.

It contains the Epistula ad Carpianum, Eusebian Canon tables, tables of the κεφαλαια (tables of contents) before each of the Gospels, Synaxarion, Menologion, and pictures.

According to Scrivener the manuscript is in good preservation, the Eusebian Canon tables are exquisite.

== Text ==
The Greek text of the codex is a representative of the Byzantine text-type. Hermann von Soden classified it to the textual family K^{x}. Kurt Aland the Greek text of the codex placed in Category V. According to the Claremont Profile Method it belongs to the textual cluster 490 and creates pair with 1486.

== History ==
Scrivener dated the manuscript to the 14th century, C. R. Gregory dated it to the 13th century. Currently the manuscript is dated by the INTF to the 14th century.

The manuscript was added to the list of New Testament manuscripts by Scrivener (630^{e}) and Gregory (839^{e}). Gregory saw it in 1886.

Currently the manuscript is housed at the University of Messina (Libr. 88), in Messina.

== See also ==
- List of New Testament minuscules
- Biblical manuscript
- Textual criticism
- Minuscule 840
