= Antonio Carafa (cardinal) =

Italian Roman Catholic Cardinal

His Eminence Antonio Carafa
- Cardinal-Priest of Santi Giovanni e Paolo
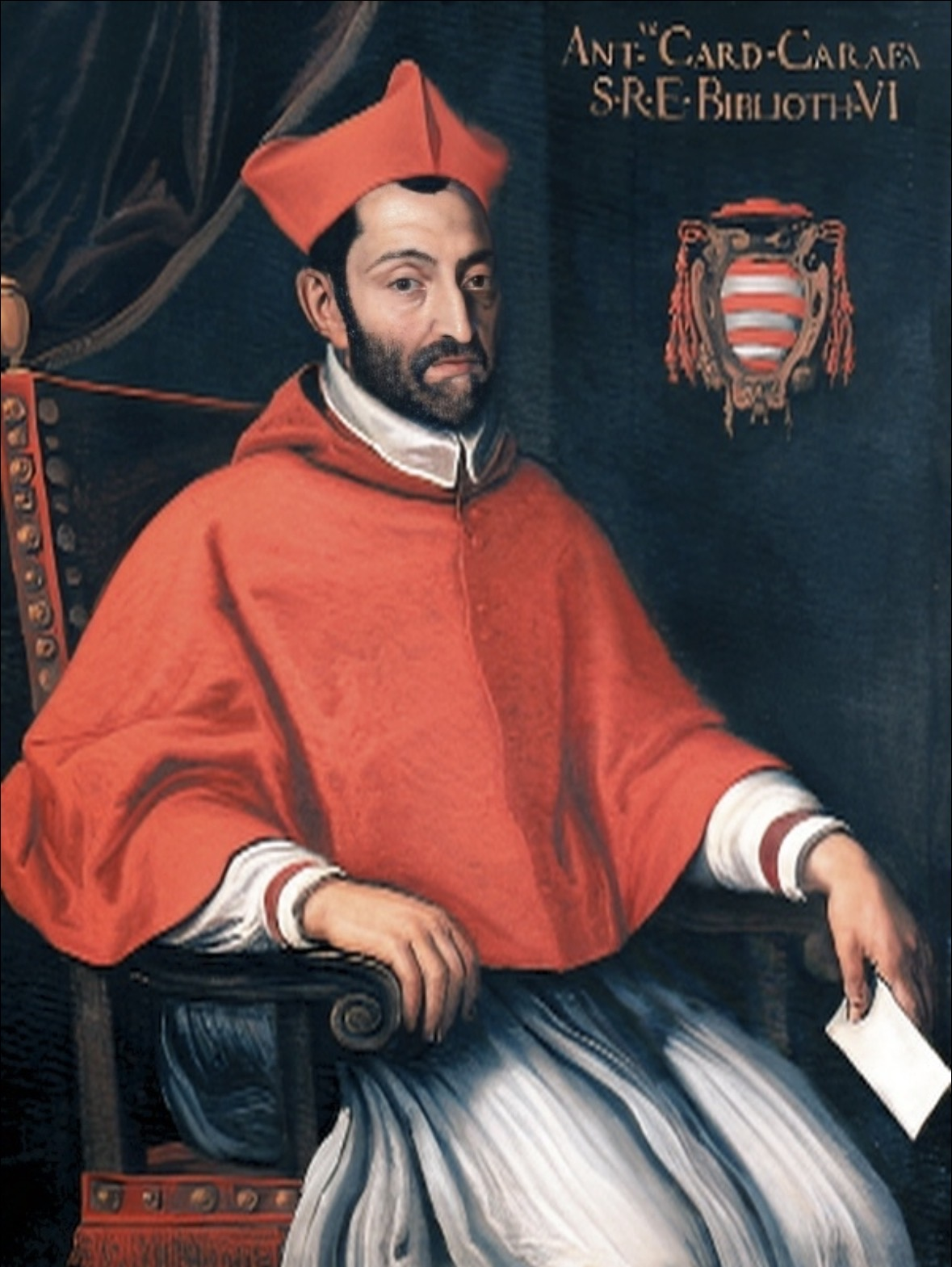
- Portrait of Cardinal Carafa, 16th century
- Church: Catholic Church
- Appointed: 28 November 1584
- Term ended: 13 January 1591
- Predecessor: Nicolas de Pellevé
- Successor: Alessandro de' Medici
- Other posts: Librarian of the Holy Roman Church (1585-1591)
- Previous posts: See list: Cardinal-Deacon of Sant'Eusebio (1568–1573, 1583-1584); Cardinal-Deacon of Santa Maria in Cosmedin (1573-1577)

Orders
- Created cardinal: 24 March 1568 by Pope Pius V
- Rank: Cardinal-Priest

Personal details
- Born: 25 March 1538 Naples, Italy
- Died: 13 January 1591 (aged 52) Rome, Papal States
- Coat of arms: Antonio Carafa's coat of arms

Antonio Carafa (25 March 1538 – 13 January 1591) was an Italian Roman Catholic Cardinal from the House of Carafa.″

== Biography ==
=== Early years ===
Antonio Carafa was born in Naples to Rinaldo I Carafello Carafa, a local patrician, and Giovanna of the signori of Montefalcone. He was a relative of Pope Paul IV through whose household he gained preferment in the Roman Curia.

He studied in the University of Padua and in Naples. He entered the Roman Curia in 1555 and became a canon of the patriarchal Vatican basilica in 1558. Carafa was expelled from Rome in 1561 following the trial and execution of some of the Carafa family. A few years later, Pope Pius V rehabilitated the Carafas and Antonio was reappointed to the canonship on 1 June 1566.

=== Cardinalate ===
He was created cardinal deacon in the consistory of 24 March 1568 and was opted for the deaconary of Sant'Eusebio. He was made Perfect of the Tribunal of the Apostolic Signature from 29 January 1569 until his death. Together with Cardinal Giulio Antonio Santorio, archbishop of Santa Severina, and Cardinal Guglielmo Sirleto, cardinal librarian of the Vatican Library, Carafa dealt with non-Latin communities and participated in the ‘congregation of the Greeks’ created by Gregory XIII in 1573, following Santorio’s initiative. Further, he was appointed protector of the Maronites on 9 December 1569. As such, he sent two missions to the Lebanon (1578 and 1580) and was a generous patron of the Pontifical Maronite College, endowing it further in his will.

Antonio Carafa participated in the Papal conclave of 1572. He was transferred to the deaconry of S. Maria in Cosmedin on 8 April 1573, then to the deaconry of S. Maria in Via Lata on 8 November 1577. He was opted for the order of the cardinal priests with the title of Sant'Eusebio on 12 December 1583. On 28 November 1584, he was appointed to the title of Ss. Giovanni e Paolo. He participated in the Papal conclave of 1585. After the death of Cardinal Guglielmo Sirleto, he was named Librarian of the Holy Roman Church on 6 October 1585. Later, he became Prefect of the S.C. of the Tridentine Council from 1586 until his death. He participated in the two Papal conclaves of 1590.

He died in Rome in 1591.

He was also a manuscript collector. Minuscule 864 was one of his manuscripts.

== See also ==
- Sixtine Vulgate
