= Minuscule 883 =

- New Testament manuscript
- Name: Cod. Palat. gr. 208
- Text: Gospel of John
- Date: 15th century
- Script: Greek
- Now at: Vatican Library
- Size: 20.7 cm by 14.3 cm
- Type: Byzantine
- Category: none

Minuscule 883 (in the Gregory-Aland numbering), Θ^{ε55} (von Soden), is a 15th-century Greek minuscule manuscript of the New Testament on paper. It has not complex contents.

== Description ==
The codex contains the text of the Gospel of John, with a commentary, on 181 paper leaves (size 20.7 cm by 14.3 cm), with lacuna in John 21:19-25. The text is written in one column per page, 24 lines per page. The commentary is of Theophylact of Ohrid.

== Text ==
The Greek text of the codex Kurt Aland did not place it in any Category.

== History ==
According to F. H. A. Scrivener and C. R. Gregory it was written in the 15th century. Currently the manuscript is dated by the INTF to the 15th century.

The manuscript was added to the list of New Testament manuscripts by Scrivener (714^{e}), Gregory (883^{e}). Gregory saw it in 1886.

Currently the manuscript is housed at the Vatican Library (Palat. gr. 208), in Rome.

== See also ==
- List of New Testament minuscules (1–1000)
- Biblical manuscript
- Textual criticism
- Minuscule 882
