= Minuscule 871 =

- New Testament manuscript
- Name: Cod. Vaticanus 2117
- Text: Gospels †
- Date: 13th century
- Script: Greek
- Now at: Vatican Library
- Size: 13.2 cm by 11.1 cm
- Type: Byzantine text-type
- Category: none
- Note: marginalia

Minuscule 871 (in the Gregory-Aland numbering), ε 102 (von Soden), is a 13th-century Greek minuscule manuscript of the New Testament on parchment. The manuscript has not survived in complete condition. It has some marginalia.

== Description ==
The codex contains the text of the four Gospels with some lacunae (Matthew 28:11-20; John 1:1-36) on 164 parchment leaves (size 13.2 cm by 11.1 cm). The text is written in one column per page, 29 lines per page. It has decorated head-pieces. According to Scrivener it is a beautiful copy.

The text is divided according to the κεφαλαια (chapters), whose numbers are given at the margin, and their τιτλοι (titles of chapters) at the top of the pages.

It contains Prolegomena, tables of the κεφαλαια (tables of contents) before each Gospel, subscriptions at the end of each Gospel (added later hand).

== Text ==
The Greek text of the codex is a representative of the Byzantine text-type. Hermann von Soden classified it to the textual family K^{x}. Kurt Aland did not place it in any Category. According to the Claremont Profile Method it represents textual group 1519 in Luke 1, Luke 10, and Luke 20.

== History ==
F. H. A. Scrivener and C. R. Gregory dated the manuscript to the 11th century. Currently the manuscript is dated by the INTF to the 13th century.

The manuscript was added to the list of New Testament manuscripts by Scrivener (687^{e}), Gregory (871^{e}). Gregory saw it in 1886.

Currently the manuscript is housed at the Vatican Library (Gr. 2117), in Rome.

== See also ==
- List of New Testament minuscules
- Biblical manuscript
- Textual criticism
- Minuscule 870
- Minuscule 872
