= Minuscule 888 =

- New Testament manuscript
- Name: Venetus Graecus Z. 26 (340)
- Text: Gospels
- Date: 14th century
- Script: Greek
- Now at: Biblioteca Marciana
- Size: 37.5 cm by 26.5 cm
- Type: Byzantine
- Category: none
- Note: marginalia

Minuscule 888 (in the Gregory-Aland numbering), Θ^{ε430} (von Soden), is a 14th-century Greek minuscule manuscript of the New Testament on paper, with a commentary. The codex has an unusual order of the Gospels. The manuscript was prepared for liturgical use.

== Description ==
The codex contains the text of the four Gospels, with a commentary, on 307 paper leaves (size 37.5 cm by 26.5 cm). The text is written in one column per page, 47 lines per page. The Gospels follow in an unusual order: Matthew, John, Mark and Luke (as 594).

The text of the Gospels is divided according to the κεφαλαια (chapters), whose numbers are given at the margin, and their τιτλοι (titles) at the top of the pages. It contains Prolegomena, tables of κεφαλαια (tables of contents) before each Gospel, lectionary markings at the margin (for liturgical use), and subscriptions at the end of each Gospel.

Folios 1-63 contain a commentary to the Prophets by Theophylact of Ohrid. It contains some additional non-biblical matter at the end.

== Text ==
The Greek text of the codex is unknown. Kurt Aland did not place it in any Category. It was not examined according to the Claremont Profile Method.

== History ==
According to C. R. Gregory it was written in the 14th or 15th century. Currently the manuscript is dated by the INTF to the 14th century. The manuscript was added to the list of New Testament manuscripts by Scrivener (888^{e}) and Gregory (888^{e}). Gregory saw it in 1886.

It is not cited in critical editions of the Greek New Testament (UBS4, NA28). Currently the manuscript is housed at the Biblioteca Marciana (Gr. Z. 26 (340)), in Venice.

== See also ==
- List of New Testament minuscules (1–1000)
- Biblical manuscript
- Textual criticism
- Minuscule 889
