= Minuscule 802 =

- New Testament manuscript
- Text: Gospel of Luke †
- Date: 14th century
- Script: Greek
- Now at: National Library of Greece
- Size: 25 cm by 19 cm
- Type: Byzantine text-type
- Category: V
- Note: –

Minuscule 802 (in the Gregory-Aland numbering), ε470 (von Soden), is a Greek minuscule manuscript of the New Testament written on paper. Palaeographically it has been assigned to the 14th century. The manuscript has no complex contents, only 24 leaves have survived.

== Description ==
The codex contains the text of the Gospel of Luke (1:1-6:13), on 24 paper leaves (size 25 cm by 19 cm). The text is written in one column per page, 20 lines per page.

It contains Argumentum, lists of the κεφαλαια (tables of contents) before each of the Gospels, lectionary markings at the margin, incipits, αναγνωσεις, and Verses.

== Text ==
The Greek text of the codex is a representative of the Byzantine text-type. Hermann von Soden classified it to the textual family K^{r}. Aland placed it in Category V.

According to the Claremont Profile Method it represents the textual family K^{r} in Luke 1. In Luke 10 and Luke 20 the manuscript is defective.

== History ==
According to Gregory the manuscript was written in the 14th century. The manuscript is currently dated by the INTF to the 14th century.

According to the subscription it once belonged to "Ananiou Hegoumenou".

It was added to the list of New Testament manuscripts by Gregory (802^{e}). Gregory saw the manuscript in 1886.

The manuscript is now housed at the National Library of Greece (99) in Athens.

== See also ==
- List of New Testament minuscules
- Textual criticism
- Minuscule 801
- Minuscule 803
