= Minuscule 806 =

- New Testament manuscript
- Text: Gospels
- Date: 14th century
- Script: Greek
- Now at: Hellenic Parliament
- Size: 15 cm by 10 cm
- Type: Byzantine text-type
- Category: V
- Note: –

Minuscule 806 (in the Gregory-Aland numbering), ε3036 (von Soden), is a Greek minuscule manuscript of the New Testament written on parchment. Palaeographically it has been assigned to the 14th century. It contains liturgical books and marginalia. The manuscript is lacunose.

== Description ==
The codex contains the text of the four Gospels, on 368 parchment leaves (size 15 cm by 10 cm).

The text is written in one column per page, 22 lines per page.

The text is divided according to the κεφαλαια (chapters), whose numbers are given at the margin, with their τιτλοι (titles) at the top of the pages. Numbers of the Ammonian Sections are given only at the beginning of lessons (in Mark 234, the last section in 16:9). It has not references to the Eusebian Canons.

It contains Prolegomena, list of the κεφαλαια (tables of contents) before each of the Gospels, lectionary markings at the margin for liturgical use, incipits, liturgical books with hagiographies: Synaxarion and Menologion, subscriptions at the end each of the Gospels, and numbers of στιχοι.

== Text ==
The Greek text of the codex is a representative of the Byzantine text-type. Hermann von Soden included it to the textual family K^{r}. Aland placed it in Category V.

According to the Claremont Profile Method it represents K^{r} it represents textual family K^{r} in Luke 1 and Luke 10. In Luke 20 it represents K^{x}.

== History ==
According to Gregory the manuscript was written in the 14th century. The manuscript is currently dated by the INTF to the 14th century.

It was added to the list of New Testament manuscripts by Gregory (806^{e}). Gregory saw the manuscript in 1886.

The manuscript is now housed at the library of the Hellenic Parliament (3) in Athens.

== See also ==
- List of New Testament minuscules
- Biblical manuscript
- Textual criticism
- Minuscule 805
