= Minuscule 814 =

- New Testament manuscript
- Text: Gospels †
- Date: 13th century
- Script: Greek
- Now at: ?
- Size: 31.3 cm by 23 cm
- Type: ?
- Category: none
- Note: –

Minuscule 814 (in the Gregory-Aland numbering), is a Greek minuscule manuscript of the New Testament written on paper. Palaeographically it had been assigned to the 13th century.

== Description ==
The codex contains the text of the four Gospels, on paper leaves (size 31.3 cm by 23 cm). Number of the leaves is unknown. It had some lacunae (John 20:10-21:25).

The text is written in one column per page, 43 lines per page.

The text is divided according to the κεφαλαια (chapters), whose numbers are given at the margin, with their τιτλοι (titles of chapters) at the top of the pages. It contained a commentary (in Mark of Victorinus of Pettau, in Luke of Titus of Bostra).

The textual character of the codex is unknown because no one examined its readings.

== History ==
The manuscript was dated by Gregory to the 13th century.

The manuscript was found in Corfu by C. R. Gregory in 1886. It belonged to Archbishop Eustathius.

It was added to the list of New Testament manuscripts by Gregory (814^{e}).

The manuscript was lost. Actual owner of the manuscript and place of its housing is unknown.

== See also ==
- List of New Testament minuscules
- Biblical manuscript
- Textual criticism
- Minuscule 813
