= Minuscule 889 =

- New Testament manuscript
- Name: Gr. Z. 30 (342)
- Text: Gospels
- Date: 14th century
- Script: Greek
- Now at: Biblioteca Marciana
- Size: 38 cm by 29.5 cm
- Type: Byzantine
- Category: V

Minuscule 889 (in the Gregory-Aland numbering), Θ^{ε430} (von Soden), is a 14th-century Greek minuscule manuscript of the New Testament on parchment, with a commentary.

== Description ==
The codex contains the text of the four Gospels, with a commentary, on 224 parchment leaves (size 38 cm by 29.5 cm). The text is written in one column per page, 32-34 lines per page. The commentary is of Theophylact's authorship. It contains tables of κεφαλαια (tables of contents) before each Gospel.

== Text ==
The Greek text of the codex is a representative of the Byzantine. Kurt Aland placed it in Category V.

It was not examined according to the Claremont Profile Method.

== History ==
According to C. R. Gregory it was written in the 14th century. The manuscript is also dated by the INTF to the 14th century. Gregory saw it in 1886.

The manuscript was added to the list of New Testament manuscripts by Scrivener (889^{e}) and Gregory (889^{e}).

Currently the manuscript is housed at the Biblioteca Marciana (Gr. Z. 30 (342)), in Venice.

== See also ==
- List of New Testament minuscules (1–1000)
- Biblical manuscript
- Textual criticism
- Minuscule 888
