= Minuscule 856 =

- New Testament manuscript
- Text: Gospels
- Date: 1280
- Script: Greek
- Now at: Vatican Library
- Size: 33.2 cm by 24.3 cm
- Type: Byzantine / mixed
- Category: none
- Note: commentary

Minuscule 856 (in the Gregory-Aland numbering), Θ^{ε300} (von Soden), is a 13th-century Greek minuscule manuscript of the New Testament on paper. The manuscript has complex content.

== Description ==
The codex contains the text of the four Gospels on 349 paper leaves (size 33.2 cm by 24.3 cm). The text is written in two column per page, 44 lines per page.

The text is divided according to the Ammonian Sections, whose numbers are given at the margin, but without references to the Eusebian Canons (written below Ammonian Section numbers).

It contains a commentary of Theophylact's authorship.

== Text ==
The Greek text of the codex is a representative of the Byzantine text-type with a mixture of other text-types. Kurt Aland did not place it in any Category.

According to the Claremont Profile Method it represents textual cluster 2148 in Luke 1, Luke 10, and Luke 20 (weak).

== History ==
According to the colophon the manuscript was written in 1280. It was written by Theodor Hagiopetrita, for the wish of one Cyril ordered by Michael Palaeaologus.

The manuscript was added to the list of New Testament manuscripts by Scrivener (669^{e}) and Gregory (856^{e}). Gregory saw it in 1886.

Currently the manuscript is housed at the Vatican Library (Gr. 644), in Rome.

== See also ==
- List of New Testament minuscules
- Biblical manuscript
- Textual criticism
- Minuscule 855
