= Minuscule 873 =

11th-century New Testament manuscript

- New Testament manuscript
- Text: Gospels
- Date: 11th century
- Script: Greek
- Now at: Vatican Library
- Size: 33.9 cm by 24.9 cm
- Type: Byzantine text-type
- Category: none
- Note: marginalia

Minuscule 873 (in the Gregory-Aland numbering), ε103 (von Soden), is an 11th-century Greek minuscule manuscript of the New Testament on parchment. The manuscript has survived in complete condition.

== Description ==
The codex contains the text of the four Gospels on 289 parchment leaves (size 33.9 cm by 24.9 cm). The text is written in two columns per page, 23 lines per page. At the end it has additional non-biblical material – Lives of 12 Apostles. According to Hermann von Soden it is an ornamented manuscript.

The text is divided according to chapters (tables of κεφαλαια), whose numbers are given at the margin, and their titles (τιτλοι) at the top of the pages. There is also another division according to the smaller Ammonian Sections, with references to the Eusebian Canons (written below Ammonian Section numbers).

It also contains the Epistula ad Carpianum, Eusebian Canon tables, and tables of contents (κεφαλαια). Subscriptions at the end of each of the Gospels with numbers of lines (ρηματα) and stichoi (στιχοι).

== Text ==
The Greek text of the codex is a representative of the Byzantine text-type. Hermann von Soden included it to the textual family K^{x}. Kurt Aland did not examine the text of the codex and did not place it in any Category.

According to the Claremont Profile Method it has a mixture of the Byzantine families in Luke 1 and represents the textual family K^{x} in Luke 20. In Luke 10 no profile was made.

It contains the spurious text of Matthew 16:2b–3 (Signs of the times) and Pericope Adulterae (John 7:53-8:11), but they are marked with an obelus as doubtful.

== History ==
C. R. Gregory dated the manuscript to the 11th century. Currently the manuscript is dated by the INTF to the 11th century. Probably it was written in Calabria. Formerly it was known as Codex Columnensis 4.

The manuscript was added to the list of New Testament manuscripts by Scrivener (689^{e}) and Gregory (873^{e}). C. R. Gregory saw it in 1886.

Currently it is housed in the Vatican Library (Gr. 2165), in Rome.

== See also ==
- List of New Testament minuscules
- Biblical manuscript
- Textual criticism
