= Minuscule 881 =

- New Testament manuscript
- Name: Cod. Ottobonianus gr. 453, 454, 455
- Text: Gospels
- Date: 15th century
- Script: Greek
- Now at: Vatican Library
- Size: 34.8 cm by 24.2 cm
- Type: Byzantine
- Category: none
- Note: marginalia

Minuscule 881 (in the Gregory-Aland numbering), Θ^{ε51} (von Soden), is a 15th-century Greek minuscule manuscript of the New Testament on paper. It has complex contents.

== Description ==
The codex contains the text of the four Gospels, with a commentary, on 523 paper leaves (size 34.8 cm by 24.2 cm). The leaves were arranged in three volumes (171 + 171 + 181 leaves). The text is written in one column per page, 31 lines per page. It was written by two scribes. The commentary is of Theophylact's authorship. It has many marginal notes.

== Text ==
The Greek text of the codex Kurt Aland did not place it in any Category. It was not examined by the Claremont Profile Method.

== History ==
According to F. H. A. Scrivener it was written in the 13th century, according to C. R. Gregory in the 15th century. Currently the manuscript is dated by the INTF to the 15th century.

The manuscript was added to the list of New Testament manuscripts by Scrivener (707^{e}, 708^{e}, 709^{e}), Gregory (881^{e}). Gregory saw it in 1886.

It was examined and described by Ernesto Feron and Fabiano Battaglini.

Currently the manuscript is housed at the Vatican Library (Ottobonianus gr. 453, 454, 455), in Rome.

== See also ==
- List of New Testament minuscules (1–1000)
- Biblical manuscript
- Textual criticism
- Minuscule 880
