= Minuscule 859 =

- New Testament manuscript
- Text: Gospel of Luke †
- Date: 16th century
- Script: Greek
- Now at: Vatican Library
- Size: 22 cm by 14.5 cm
- Type: Byzantine text-type
- Category: none
- Note: commentary

Minuscule 859 (in the Gregory-Aland numbering), Ν^{λ50} (von Soden), is a 16th-century Greek minuscule manuscript of the New Testament on parchment. The manuscript has not survived in complex context.

== Description ==
The codex contains the text of the Gospel of Luke 12:32-24:53 on 261 parchment leaves (size 22 cm by 14.5 cm). The text is written in one column per page, 25 lines per page. According to F. H. A. Scrivener and C. R. Gregory it was written on paper, but according to Aland on parchment. It contains a commentary.

== Text ==
Kurt Aland did not place the Greek text of the codex in any Category. It was not examined by the Claremont Profile Method.

== History ==
Scrivener dated the manuscript to the 15th century, Gregory dated it to the 16th century. Currently the manuscript is dated by the INTF to the 16th century.

The manuscript was added to the list of New Testament manuscripts by Scrivener (672^{e}) and Gregory (859^{e}). Gregory saw it in 1886.

Currently the manuscript is housed at the Vatican Library (Gr. 759), in Rome.

== See also ==
- List of New Testament minuscules
- Biblical manuscript
- Textual criticism
- Minuscule 858
