= Minuscule 855 =

- New Testament manuscript
- Text: Gospels
- Date: 12th century
- Script: Greek
- Now at: Vatican Library
- Size: 28.5 cm by 21 cm
- Type: ?
- Category: none
- Note: commentary

Minuscule 855 (in the Gregory-Aland numbering), Θ^{ε27} (von Soden), is a 12th-century Greek minuscule manuscript of the New Testament on parchment. The manuscript has complex content.

== Description ==
The codex contains the text of the four Gospels on 584 parchment leaves (size 28.5 cm by 21 cm). The text is written in one column per page, 36 lines per page. It is ornamented.

It contains a commentary of Theophylact's authorship and pictures.

== Text ==
Kurt Aland did not place the Greek text of the codex in any Category.

It was not examined by the Claremont Profile Method.

== History ==
F. H. A. Scrivener and C. R. Gregory dated the manuscript to the 12th century. Currently the manuscript is dated by the INTF to the 12th century.

The manuscript was added to the list of New Testament manuscripts by Scrivener (668^{e}) and Gregory (855^{e}). Gregory saw it in 1886.

Currently the manuscript is housed at the Vatican Library (Gr. 643), in Rome.

== See also ==
- List of New Testament minuscules
- Biblical manuscript
- Textual criticism
- Minuscule 854
