= Minuscule 808 =

- New Testament manuscript
- Text: New Testament
- Date: 14th century
- Script: Greek
- Now at: Hellenic Parliament
- Size: 20 cm by 15.5 cm
- Type: Byzantine text-type
- Category: V
- Note: –

Minuscule 808 (in the Gregory-Aland numbering), δ203 (von Soden), is a Greek minuscule manuscript of the New Testament written on parchment. Palaeographically it has been assigned to the 14th century. It contains liturgical books and marginalia. The manuscript has complex contents.

== Description ==
The codex contains the whole text of the New Testament, on 414 parchment leaves (size 20 cm by 15.5 cm).

The text is written in one column per page, 30 lines per page.

The text is divided according to the κεφαλαια (chapters), whose numbers are given at the margin, with their τιτλοι (titles) at the top of the pages. The text of the four Gospels is divided according to the Ammonian Sections (in Mark 241, the last section in 16:9), with references to the Eusebian Canons.

It contains Epistula ad Carpianum, Eusebian Canon tables, Prolegomena, list of the κεφαλαια (tables of contents) before each biblical book, lectionary markings, incipits, liturgical books with hagiographies: Synaxarion and Menologion, subscriptions at the end of each book, numbers of στιχοι, Verses, pictures, and Euthalian Apparatus.

The order of books is usual for the Greek manuscripts: Gospels, Acts, Catholic epistles, Pauline epistles (Philemon precede Hebrews), and Apocalypse.

== Text ==
The Greek text of the codex is a representative of the Byzantine text-type. Hermann von Soden included it to the textual family K^{x}. Aland placed it in Category V.

According to the Claremont Profile Method it represents textual family K^{x} in Luke 1 and Luke 20. In Luke 10 no profile was made. It belongs to the textual cluster 1345.

== History ==
According to Gregory the manuscript was written in the 12th century. The manuscript is currently dated by the INTF to the 14th century.

It was added to the list of New Testament manuscripts by Gregory (808^{e}). Gregory saw the manuscript in 1886.

Text of the Apocalypse was collated by Herman C. Hoskier.

The manuscript is now housed at the library of the National Library of Greece (2251) in Athens.

== See also ==
- List of New Testament minuscules
- Biblical manuscript
- Textual criticism
- Minuscule 803
