= Minuscule 2278 =

- New Testament manuscript
- Text: Gospels
- Date: 14th century
- Script: Greek
- Now at: British Library
- Size: 20.2 cm by 15 cm
- Type: Byzantine text-type
- Category: none
- Note: –

Minuscule 2278 (in the Gregory-Aland numbering), is a Greek minuscule manuscript of the New Testament written on parchment. Palaeographically it has been assigned to the 14th century. Gregory catalogued it twice as 812 and 2278.

== Description ==
The codex contains the text of the four Gospels, on 254 parchment leaves (size 20.2 cm by 15 cm).

The text is written in one column per page, 24 lines per page. The large initial letters are written in gold. The first page of every Gospel is written in gold.

The text is divided according to the κεφαλαια (chapters), whose numbers are given at the margin, with their τιτλοι (titles) at the top of the pages. There is also another division according to the Ammonian Sections (with divergences), whose numbers are given at the margin, without references to the Eusebian Canons.

It contains Epistula ad Carpianum, tables of the κεφαλαια (tables of contents) before each Gospel, and pictures. Lectionary markings at the margin (for church reading), Synaxarion, and Menologion were added by later hand.

== Text ==
The Greek text of the codex is a representative of the Byzantine text-type. Aland did not place it in any Category.

It was not examined by Hermann von Soden. According to the Claremont Profile Method it has mixed Byzantine text and represents textual family Π^{b} in Luke 1, Luke 10, and Luke 20.

It contains the Pericope Adulterae (John 7:53-8:11) without any mark.

== History ==
Gregory dated the manuscript to the 12th century. The manuscript is currently dated by the INTF to the 14th century. According to Frederick Wisse the manuscript was written in 1314. There is a note at the end of the Gospel of Matthew, made by different hand with date 1322, about an attack of the Turks. Before Matthew there is another note with date 1746.

It was held in Corfu and belonged to Archbishop Eustathius, then it came to "Dawes Collection" (as the second volume; the first volume belonged to 2277, the third to 2279). On 15 October 1904 it was bought for the British Museum.

It was added to the list of New Testament manuscripts by Gregory (812^{e}). Gregory saw it in 1886 during his visit in Greece.

On 17 October 1904 Gregory saw this manuscript in British Museum and catalogued again under the siglum 2278. This time he assigned age of the manuscript for the 11th or 12th century. Second description is more detailed though he did not enumerated pages of the codex. One page of the codex was edited in facsimile.

Kurt Aland recognized that numbers 812 and 2278 belongs to the same manuscript and number 812 was deleted from the list, actually number 2278 is used as siglum for this manuscript.

The manuscript is now housed at the library of the British Library (Add MS 37002) in London.

== See also ==
- List of New Testament minuscules
- Biblical manuscript
- Textual criticism
- Minuscule 2276
