= Minuscule 805 =

- New Testament manuscript
- Text: Gospels †
- Date: 13th century
- Script: Greek
- Now at: Hellenic Parliament
- Size: 18 cm by 12 cm
- Type: Byzantine text-type
- Category: none
- Note: –

Minuscule 805 (in the Gregory-Aland numbering), ε2050 (von Soden), is a Greek minuscule manuscript of the New Testament written on parchment. Palaeographically it has been assigned to the 13th century. The manuscript is lacunose.

== Description ==
The codex contains the text of the three first Gospels, on 244 parchment leaves (size 18 cm by 12 cm), with some lacunae. It lacks: Matthew 1:1-9; 3:16-5:46; 11:7-12:48; 13:25-26:31; 27:58-28:20; Mark 7:21-30; Luke 1:1-9.47-79; 7:31-8:16; 8:29-24:53. Matthew 14:29-15:4 was supplied by a later hand.

The text is written in one column per page, 22 lines per page.

The text is divided according to the κεφαλαια (chapters), whose numbers are given at the margin, with their τιτλοι (titles of chapters) at the top of the pages.

It contains Prolegomena, list of the κεφαλαια (tables of contents) before each of the Gospels, lectionary markings at the margin (added by later hand), incipits (later hand), and subscriptions at the end of each of the Gospels.

== Text ==
Kurt Aland the Greek text of the codex did not place in any Category.

It was not examined according to the Claremont Profile Method.

== History ==
According to Gregory the manuscript was written in the 13th century. The manuscript is currently dated by the INTF to the 13th century.

It was added to the list of New Testament manuscripts by Gregory (805^{e}). Gregory saw the manuscript in 1886.

The manuscript is now housed at the library of the Hellenic Parliament (351) in Athens.

== See also ==
- List of New Testament minuscules
- Textual criticism
- Minuscule 804
