= Minuscule 2276 =

- New Testament manuscript
- Text: Gospel of Matthew
- Date: 14th century
- Script: Greek
- Now at: British Library
- Size: 28 cm by 20.7 cm
- Type: ?
- Category: none
- Note: –

Minuscule 2276 (in the Gregory-Aland numbering), is a Greek minuscule manuscript of the New Testament written on parchment. Palaeographically it has been assigned to the 14th century. Only one leaf of the codex has survived. Gregory catalogued it twice as 815 and 2276.

== Description ==
The codex contains the text of the Gospel of Matthew (9:32-10:16), on 1 parchment leaf (size 28 cm by 20.7 cm).

The text is written in one column per page, 28 lines per page. The letters are very small (like in minuscule 80). The large initial letters are written in red.

The text is divided according to the κεφαλαια (chapters), whose numbers are given at the margin, with their τιτλοι (titles) at the top of the pages. There is also another division according to the Ammonian Sections, whose numbers are given at the margin, but there is no references to the Eusebian Canons.

It contains lectionary markings and incipits.

== Text ==
Aland the Greek text of the codex did not place in any Category. It was not examined by Hermann von Soden.

== History ==
Gregory dated the manuscript to the 12th century. The manuscript is currently dated by the INTF to the 14th century.

It was held in Corfu and belonged to Earl Gonemi, then it came to "Dawes Collection" (as second volume).

It was added to the list of New Testament manuscripts by Gregory (815^{e}). Gregory saw it in 1886 during his visit in Greece.

In 1904 Gregory saw this manuscript in British Museum and catalogued again under the siglum 2276. The manuscript was bought from C. G. Aspiotis in 1897.

Kurt Aland recognized that sigla 815 and 2276 designated the same manuscript and number 815 was deleted from the list, actually number 2278 is used as siglum for this manuscript.

The manuscript is now housed at the British Library (Add MS 35123, fol. 469) in London.

== See also ==
- List of New Testament minuscules
- Biblical manuscript
- Textual criticism
- Minuscule 2278
