= Catena (biblical commentary) =

Commentary composed entirely of excerpts from earlier commentaries

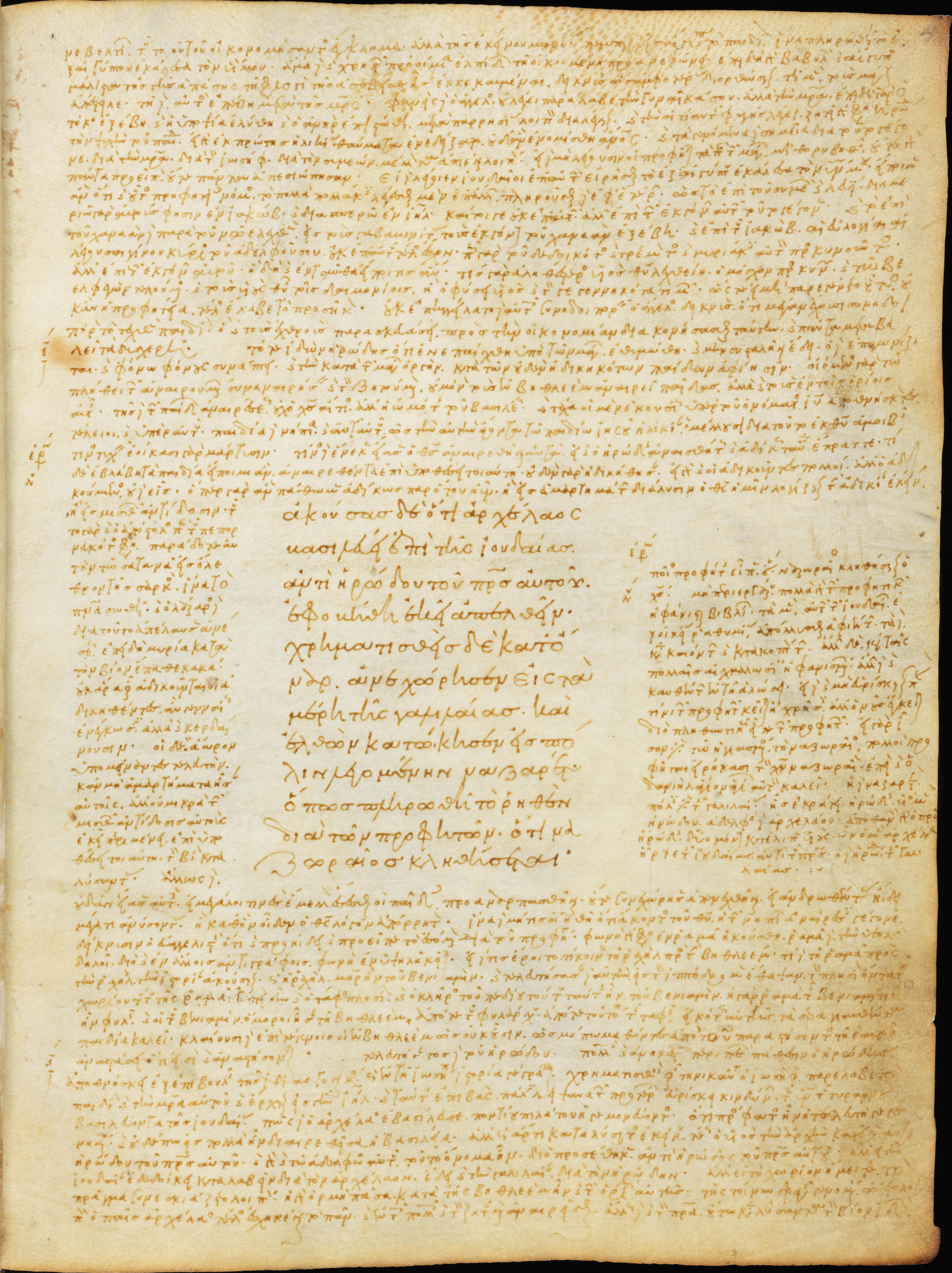
The biblical text surrounded by a catena, in Minuscule 556

A catena (from Latin catena, a chain) is a form of biblical commentary, verse by verse, made up entirely of excerpts from earlier Biblical commentators, each introduced with the name of the author, and with such minor adjustments of words to allow the whole to form a continuous commentary. John Henry Newman, in his preface to Thomas Aquinas' Catena Aurea, explains that a "Catena Patrum" is "a string or series of passages selected from the writings of various Fathers, and arranged for the elucidation of some portion of Scripture, as the Psalms or the Gospels".

The texts are mainly compiled from popular authors, but they often contain fragments of certain patristic writings now otherwise lost. It has been asserted by Faulhaber that half of all the commentaries on scripture composed by the church Fathers are now extant only in this form.

== History ==
The earliest Greek catena is ascribed to Procopius of Gaza, in the first part of the sixth century. Between the seventh and the tenth centuries, Andreas Presbyter and Johannes Drungarius were the compilers of catenas to various Books of Scripture. Towards the end of the eleventh century Nicetas of Heraclea produced a great number of catenae. Both before and after, however, the makers of catenae were numerous in the Greek Orient, mostly anonymous, and offering no other indication of their personality than the manuscripts of their excerpts. Similar compilations were also made in the Syriac and Coptic Churches.

In the West, Primasius of Adrumentum in the former Roman province of Africa in the sixth century compiled the first catena from Latin commentators. He was imitated by Rhabanus Maurus (d. 865), Paschasius Radbertus, and Walafrid Strabo, later by Remigius of Auxerre (d. 900), and by Lanfranc of Canterbury (d. 1089). The Western catenae have had less importance attached to them. The most famous of the medieval Latin compilations of this kind is that of Thomas Aquinas, generally known as the Catena aurea (Golden chain) and containing commentary from over eighty Greek and Latin Church Fathers on the Gospels. Thomas composed the parts of his Catena aurea treating the gospels of Mark, Luke, and John while directing the Roman studium of the Dominican Order at the convent of Santa Sabina, the forerunner of the Pontifical University of Saint Thomas Aquinas, Angelicum.

Similar collections of Greek patristic utterances were constructed for dogmatic purposes. They were used at the Council of Chalcedon in 451, at the Fifth General Council in 553, also apropos of Iconoclasm in the Seventh General Council in 787; and among the Greeks such compilations, like the exegetical catenae, did not cease until late in the Middle Ages. The oldest of these dogmatic compilations, attributed to the latter part of the seventh century, is the "Antiquorum Patrum doctrina de Verbi incarnatione".

Finally, in response to homiletic and practical needs, there appeared, previous to the tenth century, a number of collections of moral sentences and paraenetic fragments, partly from Scripture and partly from the more famous ecclesiastical writers; sometimes one writer (e.g. Gregory of Nazianzus, Basil the Great, especially John Chrysostom whom all the catenae-makers pillage freely) furnishes the material. Such collections are not so numerous as the Scriptural or even the dogmatic catenae. They seem all to depend on an ancient Christian "Florilegium" of the sixth century, that treated, in three books, of God, Man, the Virtues and Vices, and was known as τὰ ἱερά (Sacred Things). Before long its material was recast in strict alphabetical order; took the name of τὰ ἱερὰ παράλληλα, "Sacra Parallela" (because in the third book a virtue and a vice had been regularly opposed to one another); and was attributed widely to John Damascene, whose authority was defended (against Loofs, Wendland, and Cohn) by K. Holl in the above-mentioned "Fragmente vornikänischer Kirchenväter" (Leipzig, 1899), though the Damascene probably based his work on the "Capita theologica" of Maximus Confessor. The text of these ancient compilations is often in a dubious state, and the authors of most of them are unknown; one of the principal difficulties in their use is the uncertainty concerning the correctness of the names to which the excerpts are attributed. The carelessness of copyists, the use of "sigla", contractions for proper names, and the frequency of transcription, led naturally to much confusion.

== Printed editions ==
From the fifteenth century to the nineteenth, various catenas were printed. Few modern editions exist, and there can be textual challenges in translating and editing them. That said, the Catena Aurea requested by Pope Urban IV and written by Saint Thomas Aquinas in 1263ff has been translated several times. Some versions are currently available online (see, e.g., archive.org). Arguably one of the best editions that is available and in English is the edition translated by Cardinal John Henry Newman and published in 1841; this edition was republished by the Baronius Press in 2013 and is still in print. Newman wrote about the Catena Aurea: "Other compilations exhibit research, industry, learning; but this, though a mere compilation, evinces a masterly command over the whole subject of Theology". The Aquinas Institute will be publishing a new translation (currently planned for 2028) as part of their Aquinas Opera Omnia project.

Among the editors of Greek catenae was the Jesuit Balthasar Cordier, who published (1628–47) collections of Greek patristic commentaries on St. John and St. Luke and, in conjunction with his confrère Possin, on St. Matthew; the latter scholar edited also (1673) similar collections of patristic excerpts on St. Mark and Job. The voluminous catenae known as Biblia Magna (Paris, 1643) and Biblia Maxima (Paris, 1660), edited by J. de la Haye, were followed by the nine volumes of Critici Sacri, sive clarissimorum virorum annotationes atque tractatus in biblia, containing selections, not only from Catholic but also from Protestant commentators.

An important collection of the Greek catenae on the New Testament is that of J. A. Cramer (Oxford, 1838–44), online at archive.org. See also the twenty-eight volumes of the Migne commentary in his "Scripturae sacrae cursus completus" (Paris, 1840–45).

For the Byzantine collections of ethical sentences and proverbs of Stobaeus, Maximus Confessor, Antonius Melissa, Johannes Georgides, Macarius, Michael Apostolios, partly from Christian and partly from pagan sources, see Krumbacher, pp. 600–4, also E. Elter, De Gnomologiorum Graecorum historia atque origine.

== Online Catenas ==
Some websites host online versions of catenas, whether they be uploads of older books or original works. An example of a web original catena is CatenaBible.com, founded in 2015, which provides commentary from both Church Fathers and more modern writers such as George Leo Haydock. Another example of an online version is the "e-Catena" of Peter Kirby on Early Christian Writings.
