= Di Blasi =

Di Blasi or DiBlasi may refer to:

- Di Blasi Industriale, an Italian manufacturer of folding bicycles, tricycles, mopeds and scooter based in Vizzini, Sicily
- Debra Di Blasi (born 1957), American author and screenwriter
- Francesco Paolo Di Blasi (1753 or 1755–1795), Sicilian jurist, revolutionary and writer
- Giuseppina Di Blasi (born 1979), Italian archer
- Giovanni Evangelista Di Blasi (1721–1812), Italian Benedictine monk, philosopher, historian and writer
- Salvatore Maria di Blasi (1719–1814), Italian Benedictine monk, scholar, and librarian
- Anthony DiBlasi, American film director, producer, and screenwriter
- Joseph J. DiBlasi, American politician

== See also ==
- Blasi
- De Blasi
- De Blasis
- Di Blasio
