= Taddeo Crivelli =

Italian painter

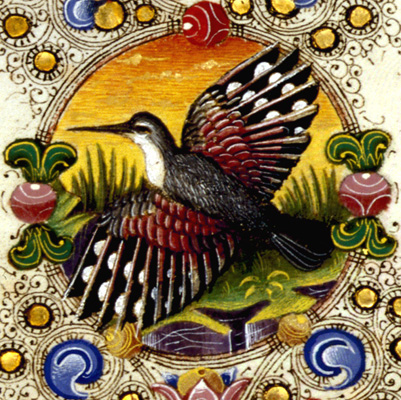
Illumination from the Borso Bible (Biblioteca Estense)

Taddeo Crivelli (fl. 1451, died by 1479), also known as Taddeo da Ferrara, was an Italian painter of illuminated manuscripts. He is considered one of the foremost 15th-century illuminators of the Ferrara school, and also has the distinction of being the probable engraver of the first book illustrated with maps, which was also the first book using engraving.

His most prestigious commission was a lavishly illustrated two-volume Bible produced between 1455 and 1461 for Ferrara's ruler, Duke Borso d'Este. Other surviving works he took charge of in Ferrara include an illuminated copy of Boccaccio’s Decameron and a luxurious book of hours known as the Gualenghi-d'Este Hours.

After Borso's death in 1471 he moved to Bologna, where payments for his work declined. Despite the lavish works he supervised during his career he sometimes pawned parts of manuscripts he was supposed to illuminate, suggesting his finances were far from stable. His last recorded work dates from 1476.

== Biography ==
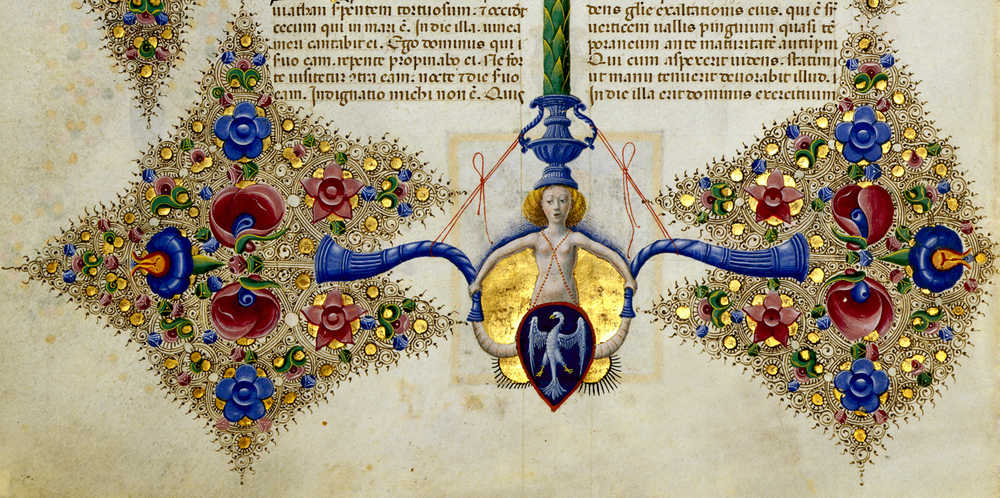
Detail from a page of the Borso Bible displaying the Este family's coat of arms

=== Background and career in Ferrara ===
He appears to have been born in Ferrara sometime in the 1420s. His father, Niccolò Crivelli, and his grandfather, Bongrazia Crivelli, were both notaries. They were naturalized citizens of Ferrara, who are thought to have migrated from somewhere in Lombardy. Crivelli's own life is largely undocumented until 1451, by which time he was certainly working in Ferrara. Analysis of his personal account book between 1451 and 1457 alongside official court documents indicates that Crivelli was in charge of a busy workshop, sharing work out with assistants and colleagues. Nevertheless, records of illicit pawnbroking transactions of parts of manuscripts he had been engaged to illuminate suggest that his financial situation was far from stable.

From 1455 until 1461, he worked, together with Franco dei Russi, on his most prestigious commission: the miniatures for the luxuriously produced personal Bible of Ferrara's ruler Borso d'Este, who chose to take it to Rome to show it off to Pope Paul II on the occasion of his investiture as Duke of Ferrara in 1471. Borso's commission for this lavish work specifically demanded "magnificence" fit for the subject: the resulting two-volume work, which has been called "an encyclopedia of 15th-century Ferrarese illumination", reflects the most exquisite and extravagant courtly taste of the age. Crivelli was responsible for the majority of the illustration work. Other painters who assisted Crivelli and Russi on the illuminations include Guglielmo Giraldi, Giorgio D'Allemagna and a youthful Girolamo da Cremona. Production of the Bible cost exactly twice the amount paid to Domenico Ghirlandaio for the entire Tornabuoni Chapel in Santa Maria Novella in Florence. The illumination work alone cost five thousand lire, which at the time represented a colossal sum of money. The Borso Bible (as it is sometimes called) is now conserved in the Biblioteca Estense in Modena. (Note: The Borso Bible was first moved to Modena with the rest of the ducal library in 1598, and remained there until 1859, when it was taken to Vienna by the last Duke of Modena, Francis V. It then entered the private collection of Archduke Franz Ferdinand of Austria-Este, but after his assassination in 1914, it became part of the imperial library in Vienna. In 1918 it was taken to Switzerland by the deposed Emperor Charles I of Austria. On Charles's death in 1922, the manuscript was purchased in Paris by Giovanni Treccani, the Milanese industrialist and founder of the Enciclopedia Italiana, who restored it to its current home in the Biblioteca Estense in Modena.)

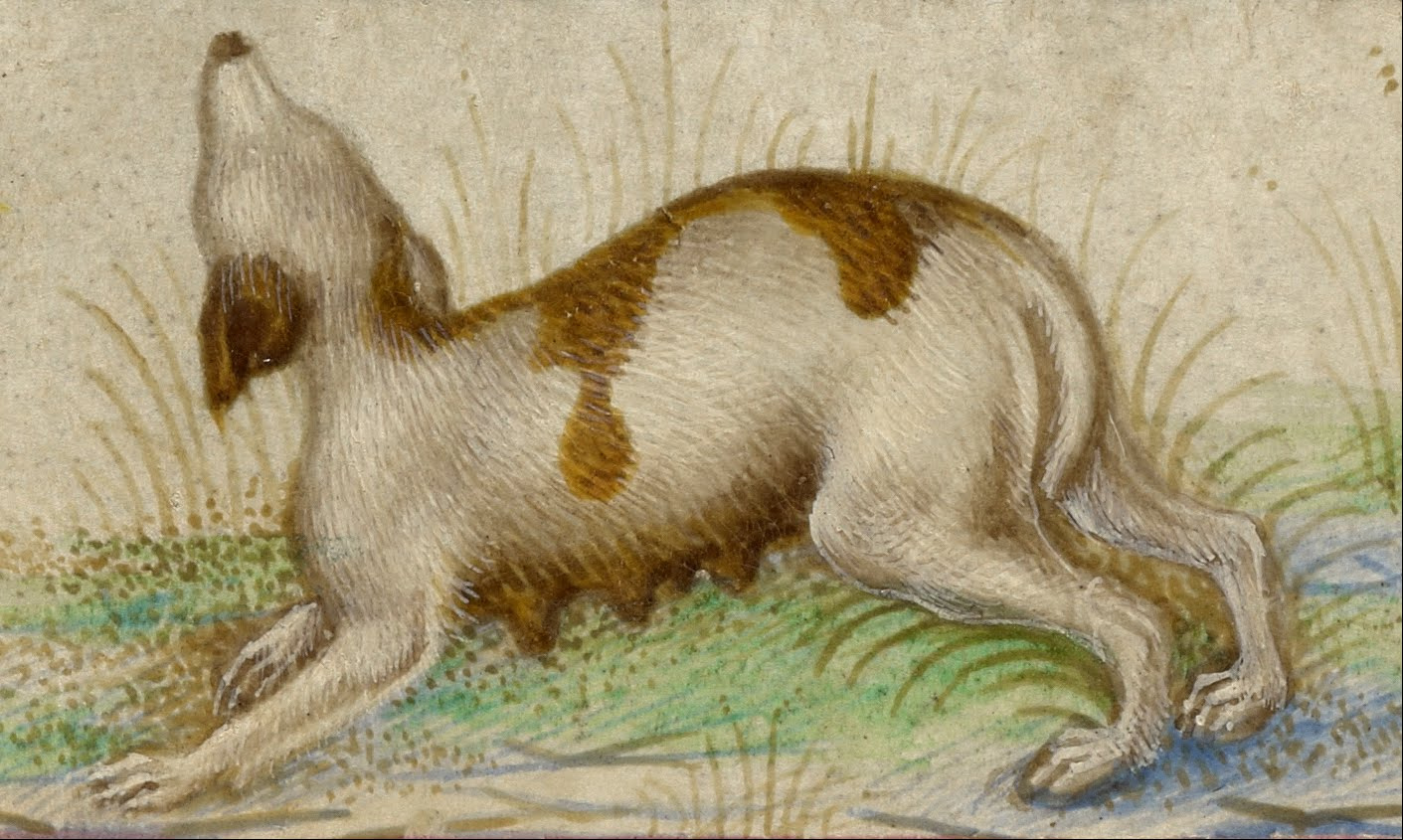
Illumination from the Gualenghi-d'Este Hours

Crivelli is known to have completed other major works in Ferrara, at least two of which survive. A 1467 illuminated copy of Boccaccio’s Decameron, which was commissioned for Teofilo Calcagnini, a court advisor to Borso, is conserved in the Bodleian Library in Oxford. A sumptuous book of hours, known as the Gualenghi-d'Este Hours, produced some time after the marriage in 1469 of Orsina D'Este with Andrea Gualengo (another prominent advisor to Borso), is conserved in the Getty Museum.

Although he may have produced larger paintings while in Ferrara, (Note: This supposition is based on a letter from Borso requesting the execution of a small painting (quadretto) by Crivelli.) none has been found. A record of a pawnbroking transaction of 1472 suggests that he may have left Ferrara abruptly, presumably in the wake of Borso's death in 1471, and perhaps attracted by the patronage of the Bentivoglio family in Bologna.

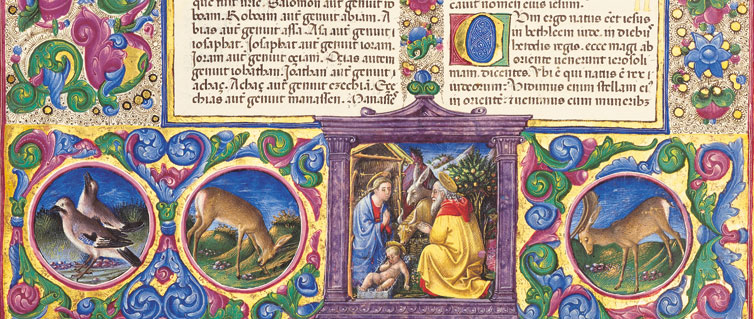
Detail from the Borso Bible, Crivelli's most significant commission. It was produced together with Franco dei Russi, (a member of Crivelli's own circle), to whom this nativity scene has been attributed.

=== Final years in Bologna ===
By 1473 Crivelli was working in Bologna with a fellow miniaturist, Domenico Pagliarolo (fl 1471–97), on a Gradual for the monastery of San Procolo. He also took on the unfamiliar task of engraving maps and nautical charts, and is usually accepted as the engraver of the 1477 Bolognese edition of Ptolemy's Cosmographia, the first book both to contain printed maps and to be illustrated by engravings rather than woodcuts. A slightly later map of the world on a single sheet has also been attributed to him, but is now not thought to be his. Receipts show that in this period payments for his illuminations declined. He was engaged to work on manuscripts for the grand basilica of San Petronio, but ended up pawning parts of them (which his patrons later bought back). His last recorded work dates from 1476; by 1479 he is referred to as being dead.

=== Personal life ===
His wife Margherita bore him three sons and a daughter, Lodovica, who married the painter Lorenzo Costa.

== Style ==
The style of the art-work in the Borso Bible has been linked to the Ferrara school of painting which developed under the influence of Cosmè Tura (and especially to the frescoes that were subsequently painted to decorate the Salone dei mesi in Palazzo Schifanoia). Some of Crivelli's stylistic traits, such as his use of line in representations of clothing and clouds, also suggest Lombard influence. The elaborately decorated miniatures for the Borso Bible are characterized by saturated colouring and rich costumes that would seem to comply with Borso's luxurious tastes. Architectural spaces are rendered by means of false perspective.

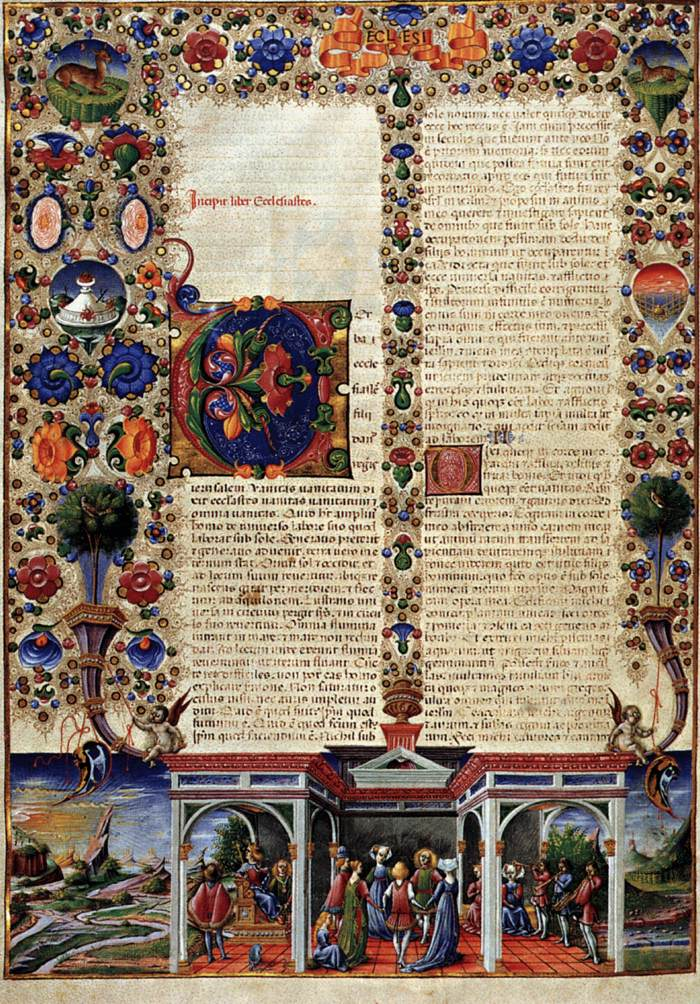
Page from the Borso Bible

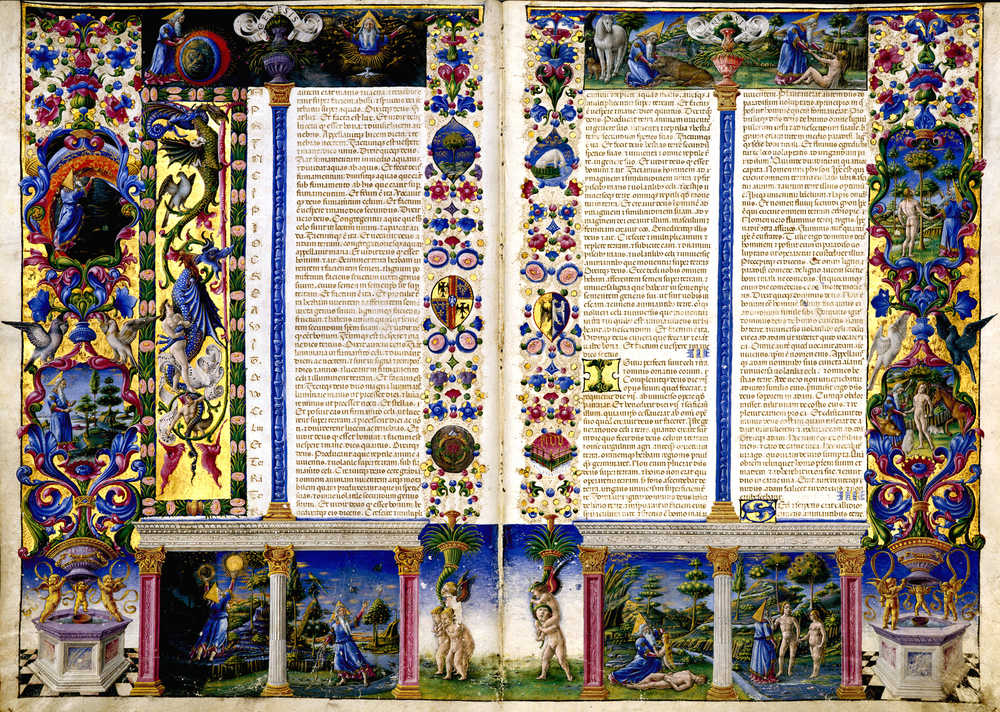
Double page

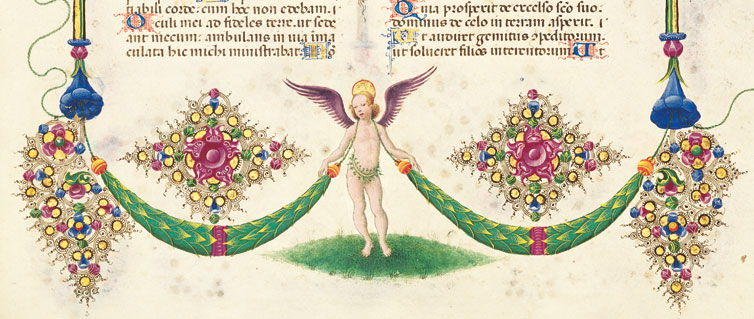
Detail from the bottom of a page

Miniature in a manuscript from The Decameron by Giovanni Boccaccio (1467)

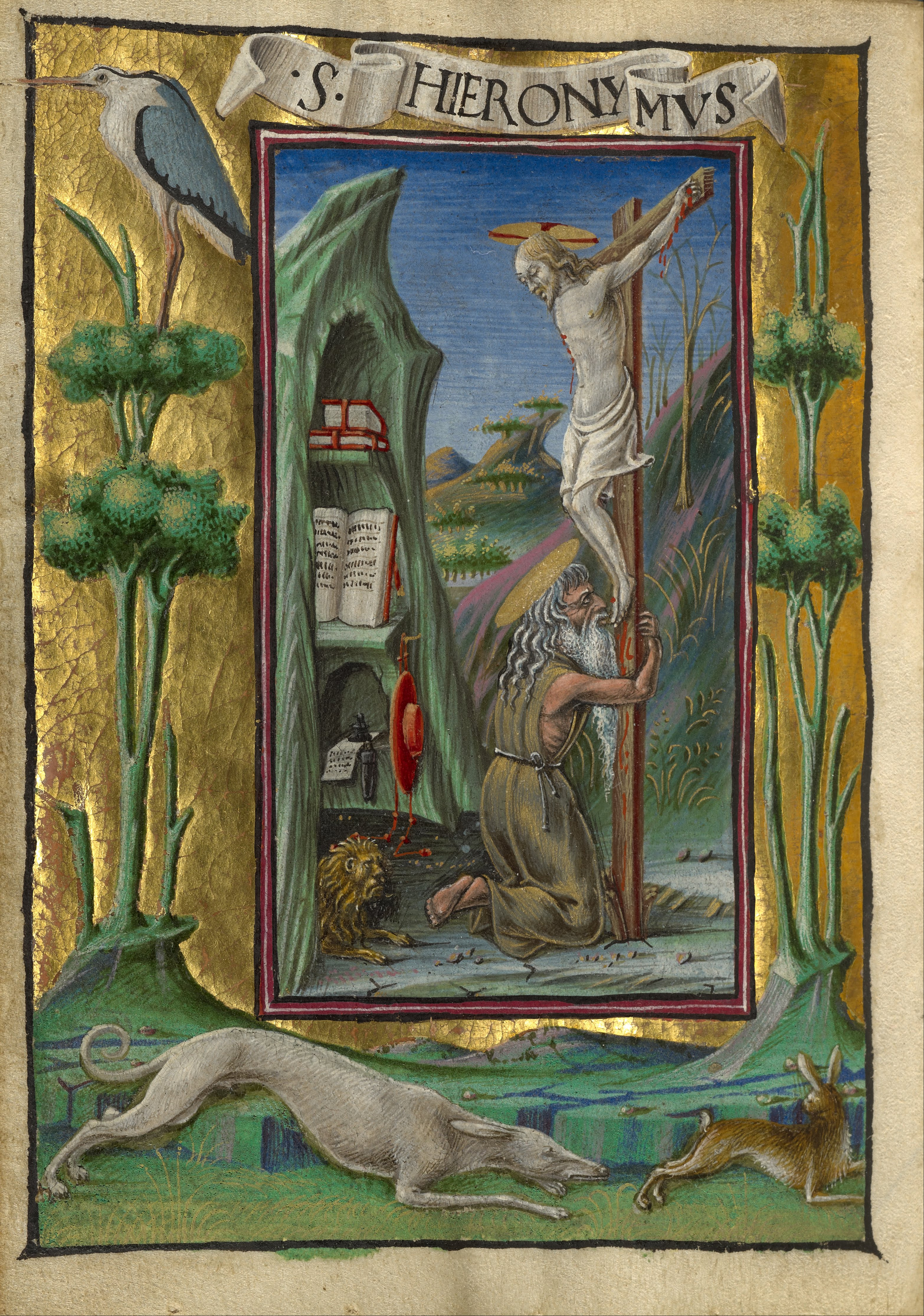
St. Jerome in the Desert with rabbit chased by hound

== Notes and references ==
Notes

== Sources ==
- Barstow, Kurt (2000). The Gualenghi-d'Este Hours: Art and Devotion in Renaissance Ferrara. Los Angeles: Getty Publications. ISBN 978-0-89236-370-4.
