= Blasi =

Family name of Italian origin

Blasi is a family name of Italian origin. It may refer to:

- Enrico Blasi (born 1972), Canadian hockey player and coach
- Ettore Blasi (1895–?), Italian long-distance runner
- Gary Blasi, Professor of Law Emeritus at UCLA
- Gianfranco Blasi (born 1958), Italian politician, essayist, and poet
- Ilary Blasi (born 1981), Italian showgirl and model
- Joseph Blasi, American economic sociologist
- Manuele Blasi (born 1980), Italian footballer
- Rosa Blasi (born 1972), American actress
- Scott Blasi (born 1973), American horse trainer
- Silverio Blasi (1921–1995), Italian director, actor, and writer
- Umberto Blasi (1886–1938), Italian long-distance runner

== See also ==
- Blasis
- Di Blasi
- Di Blasio
