= Francesco Paolo Di Blasi =

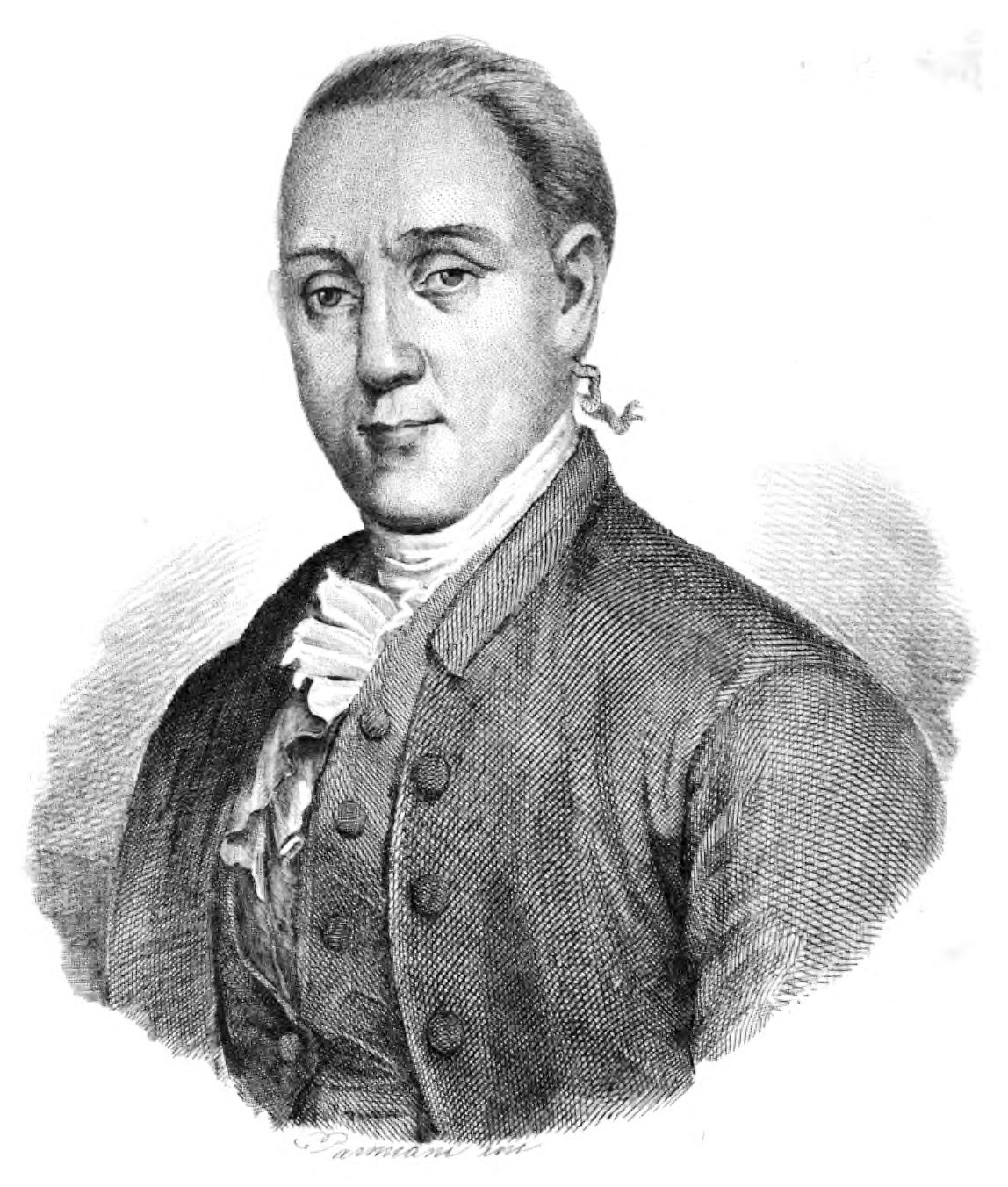
- Born: 1753 or 1755; Palermo, Kingdom of Sicily
- Died: 20 May 1795 (aged 40–42); Palermo, Kingdom of Sicily
- Occupations: jurist, revolutionary, writer

Francesco Paolo Di Blasi (Palermo, 1753 or 1755 – Palermo, 20 May 1795) was a Sicilian jurist, revolutionary and writer, known as an important advocate of the Sicilian nationalism.

Nephew of the Benedictine abbots Salvatore Maria and Giovanni Evangelista, Francesco Paolo Di Blasi was a lawyer influenced by Illuminism. In 1790, he was involved in the foundation of the Accademia Siciliana, an institution devoted to the protection of the Sicilian language. Fascinated by the French Revolution, in 1795 Di Blasi was arrested and tried. Charged with republican conspiracy, he was executed by decapitation in Palermo, at the "Piano di Santa Teresa" (current Piazza Indipendenza), on 20 May 1795.

His matter is told by Leonardo Sciascia's novel The Council of Egypt (1963).

His character plays an important role in the historical novel Calvello the Bastard by Luigi Natoli.

== Works ==
- Dissertazione sopra l'egualità e ladisuguaglianza degli uomini in riguardo alla loro felicità (1778)
- Saggio sopra la legislazione di Sicilia (1790)
- Pragmaticae sanctiones Regni Siciliae, quas iussu Ferdinandi III Borbonii nunc primum ad fidem authenticorum exemplarium in regiis tabulariis existentium recensuit Fr. Paulusde Blasi (1791–93)
