= 586 (disambiguation) =

586 AD was a year of the Julian calendar.

586 may also refer to:

== Computing ==
- P5 (microarchitecture) (Pentium, 80586, i586), Intel fifth generation x86 processor architecture, and related:
  - Cyrix 5x86
  - Nx586, by NexGen, later called AMD 5N86
  - AMD K5 (5K86, AM586, 5x86)

== Other uses ==
- 586 (number), a number
- Minuscule 586 (Gregory-Aland), manuscript of the New Testament
- Smith & Wesson Model 586, a revolver
- "5 8 6", a song on the album Power, Corruption & Lies by New Order
