= Minuscule 360 =

- New Testament manuscript
- Name: Codex de Rossi 1
- Text: Gospels
- Date: 11th century
- Script: Greek
- Now at: Biblioteca Palatina, Parma
- Size: 19.5 cm by 15.7 cm
- Type: Byzantine text-type
- Category: V
- Note: marginalia

Minuscule 360 is a Greek minuscule manuscript of the New Testament, made of parchment. It is designated by the siglum 360 in the Gregory-Aland numbering of New Testament manuscripts, and ε 1009 in the von Soden numbering of New Testament manuscripts. Using the study of comparative writing styles (palaeography), it has been assigned to the 11th century. It was known as Codex de Rossi 1. It has marginal notes.

== Description ==
The manuscript is a codex (precursor to the modern book format), containing complete text of the four Gospels on 220 parchment leaves (19.5 cm by 15.7 cm). The text is written in two columns per page, in 23 lines per page.

The text is divided according to the chapters (known as κεφαλαια / kephalaia), whose numbers are given in the margin, and their titles (known as τιτλοι / titloi) written at the top of the pages. There is also a division according to the Ammonian Sections (233 in Mark, the last in 16:8), whose numbers are given in the margin, with references to the Eusebian Canons written below Ammonian Section numbers. It contains tables of contents (also known as κεφαλαια) before each Gospel, pictures, a Synaxarion, a Menologion, and lectionary markings were added in the margin by a later hand.

== Text ==
The Greek text of the codex is considered to be a representative of the Byzantine text-type. Biblical scholar Kurt Aland placed it in Category V of his New Testament manuscript classification system. Category V manuscripts are described as "manuscripts with a purely or predominantly Byzantine text." According to biblical scholar Frederick H. A. Scrivener, it has "some unusual readings".

According to the Claremont Profile Method (a specific analysis of textual data), it represents textual family K^{x} in Luke 1, Luke 10, and Luke 20. It creates a textual pair with minuscule 358.

== History ==
The earliest history of the manuscript is unknown. It once belonged to J. B. de Rossi who described it in his catalogue and collated its text (along with minuscule 361). The manuscript was added to the list of New Testament manuscripts by textual critic Johann M. A. Scholz (1794-1852). It was examined by biblical scholar and clergyman Dean Burgon. Biblical scholar Caspar René Gregory saw it in 1886.

The manuscript is currently dated by the INTF to the 11th cneutry. It is presently located at the Platina Library (shelf number Ms. Parm. 2319) in Parma.

== See also ==
- Minuscule 361
- Minuscule 359
- List of New Testament minuscules
- Biblical manuscript
- Textual criticism
