= Borso d'Este Bible =

Illuminated manuscript

Coordinates: 44.6481°N 10.9211°E

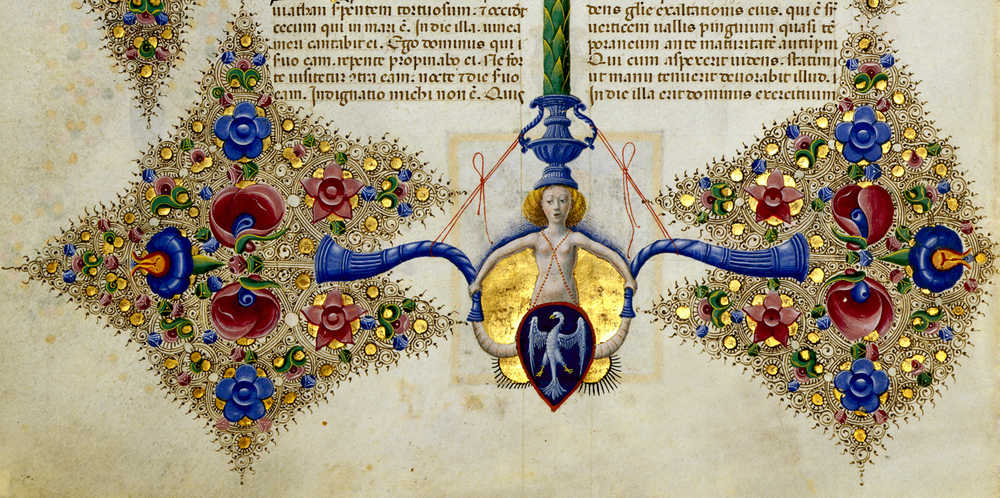
Illumination including Este coat of arms

The Bible of Borso d'Este is a two-volume illuminated manuscript. The miniatures, created by Taddeo Crivelli and others, were executed between 1455 and 1461. The manuscript is currently preserved in the Biblioteca Estense di Modena (Ms. Lat. 422–423).

== History ==
The Bible of Borso d'Este is considered one of the most remarkable illuminated manuscripts of the Renaissance. It was produced over a period of six years by a team of artists led by Taddeo Crivelli and Franco dei Russi.

Originally housed in Ferrara, the manuscript was transferred to Modena in 1598, following the relocation of the ducal court. It remained in Modena until the dissolution of the duchy in 1859, after which it was taken—along with other valuable treasures of the royal house—by Francesco V into exile.

The Bible was later recovered during the First World War, when it was acquired by Italian senator Giovanni Treccani. He subsequently donated the manuscript to the Biblioteca Estense, where it remains today.

== Description and style ==
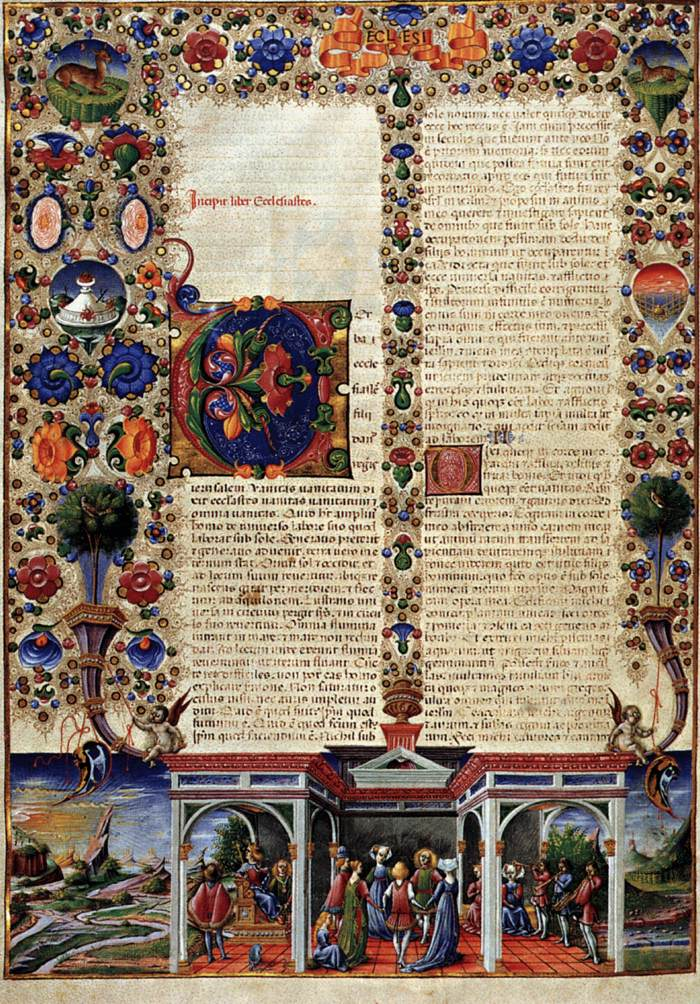
Page from the Borso d'Este Bible

Each page of the Bible is adorned with an elegant frame composed of scrolls and various ornamental motifs, enclosing two columns of text. The margins are richly decorated with miniature scenes, particularly in the lower portions, where perspectival compositions reflect the influence of contemporary developments in Renaissance painting.

Additional illustrations appear between the columns of text, often adjacent to illuminated initials or capital letters. The volutes in the corners frequently feature animals rendered with vivid imagination—an element characteristic of the courtly aesthetic of the period—and often incorporate heraldic symbols associated with Borso d'Este and his family.

== Other images ==
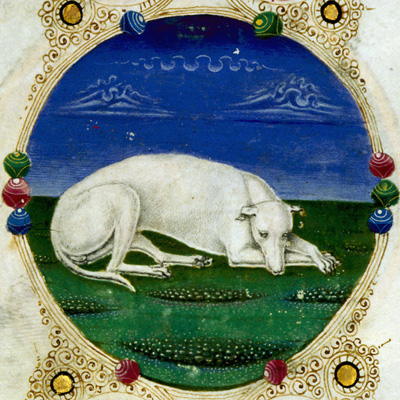
Animali

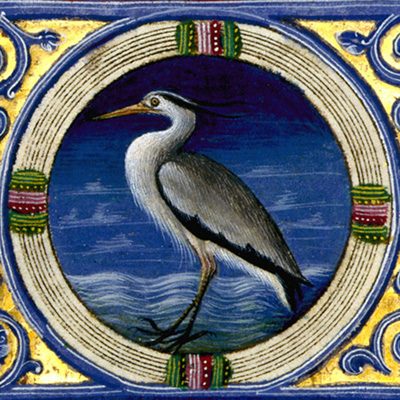
Animali

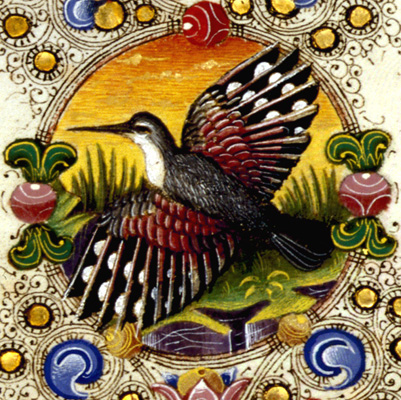
Animali

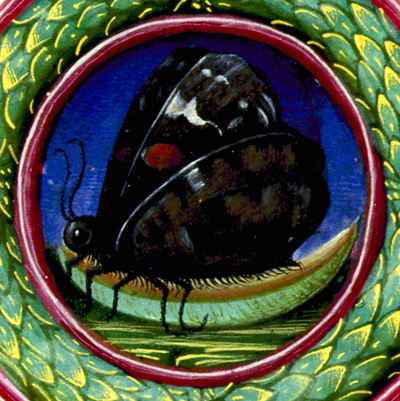
Animali

== Reproductions ==
In 1923, the businessman Giovanni Treccani purchased the Borso d'Este Bible in Paris for the enormous sum of 5 million lire, preventing its sale to the United States, and donated it to the Kingdom of Italy. At his initiative, several high-quality facsimile editions of the manuscript were later produced.

== Bibliography ==
- Stefano Zuffi, Il Quattrocento, Electa, Milano 2004. ISBN 8837023154.
- Published in full on the website of the Estense Library: V.G.12 and V.G.13.
- La Bibbia di Borso D'Este. Riprodotta integralmente per mandato di Giovanni Treccani. Con documenti e studio storico-artistico di Adolfo Venturi, Aa.vv., Emilio Bestetti Editore D'Arte, Milano, 1937. Riprodotta integralmente per mandato di Giovanni Treccani con documenti e studio storico-artistico di Adolfo Venturi. Il testo è su due colonne incorniciate da fregi e figure in bianco e nero. Numerose tavole di pagine con fregi e miniature a colori riprodotte fuori testo ed una tavola applicata a colori con ritratto di Borso D'Este. 2 Voll., cm.31x41,5,(in folio) pp. 68, 311, 292. titolo in oro e impressioni a secco ai piatti, sguardie in seta con stemma in oro. legg.ed.cartonata, dorsi con fregi in oro.
- La Bibbia di Borso d'Este. TRECCANI DEGLI ALFIERI, Giovanni - VENTURI, Adolfo, Banca Popolare e Poligrafiche Bolis, Bergamo, 1962. A cura di Giovanni Treccani degli Alfieri con documenti e studio storico-artistico di Adolfo Venturi. Riproduzione integrale del testo in nero ed in parte su tavole a 12 colori e oro battuto applicato a mano. 2 voll. cm.30,5x42, pp. 1300 nn. cofanetto fasciato in velluto. (legg.ed.in pelle, nervi i titoli in oro ai dorsi, stemma in argento applicato sul piatto ant.
- La Bibbia di Borso d'Este : ms. Lat. 422–423, Biblioteca Estense e universitaria, (Facsimile e Commentario)AA.VV:, Franco Cosimo Panini, Modena, 1997. Rilegato. Condizione libro: As New. Condizione sovraccoperta: As New. 1ère Édition. 41 Cm. Citazioni 6 Titolo La Bibbia di Borso d'Este : ms. Lat. 422–423, Biblioteca Estense e universitaria, Modena : Ferrara, seconda metà del 15. secolo Pubblicazione \Roma! : Istituto della Enciclopedia italiana; Modena : F. C. Panini Descrizione fisica v.; 41 cm Note generali Ed. di 750 esempl. di cui 748 num. Titolo uniforme Bibbia, Comprende 1 2 Commentario al codice. - Classificazione Dewey 220.47
