= Francesco Paulucci di Calboli =

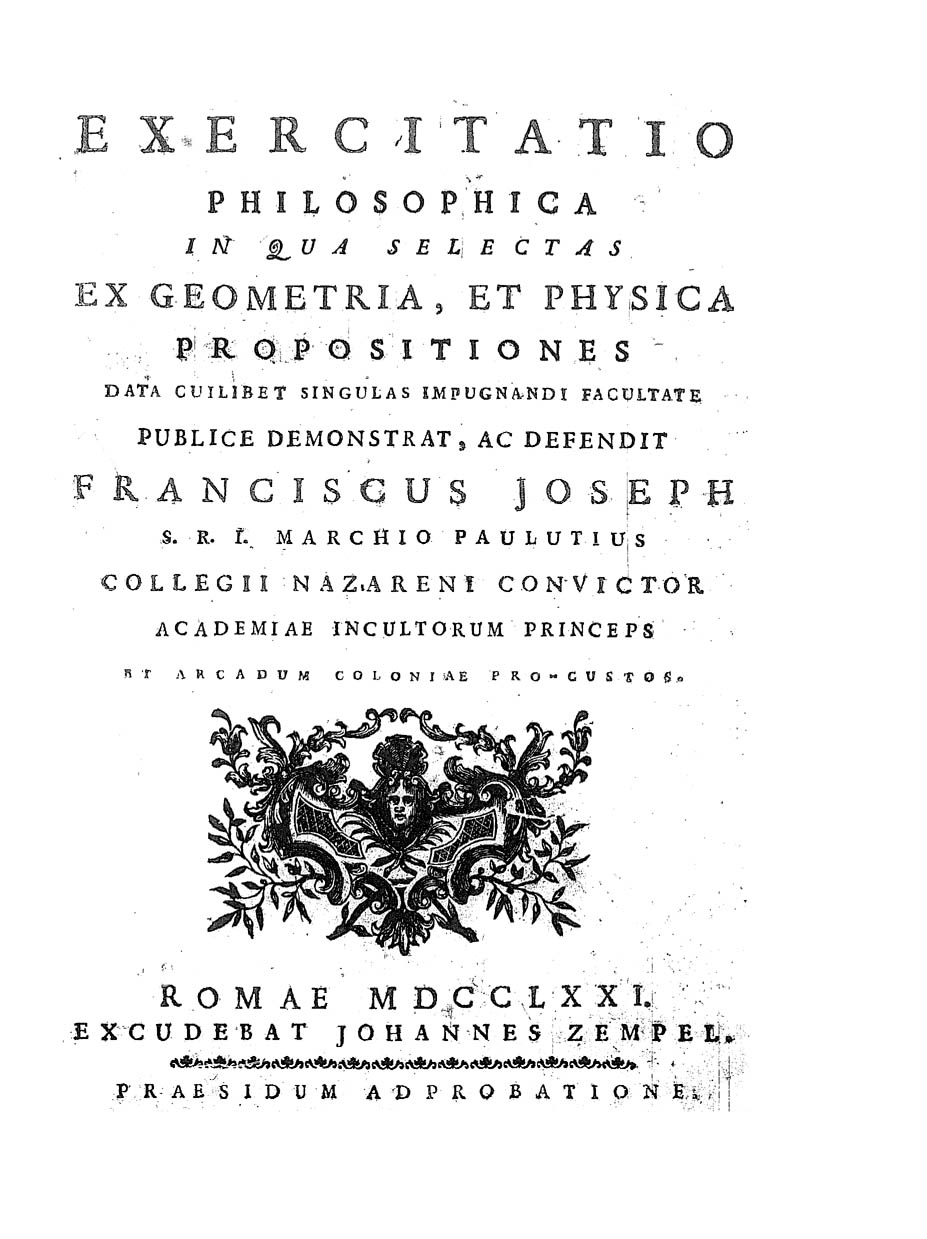
Exercitatio philosophica, title page

Francesco Giuseppe Paulucci di Calboli was an Italian nobleman and writer who lived between the second half of the 18th and the first half of the 19th century. He was director of the Palatina Library of Parma.

== Works ==
- Exercitatio philosophica, in qua selectas ex geometria, et physica propositiones data cuilibet singulas impugnandi facultate publice demonstrat, ac defendit (in Latin). Rome: Giovanni Zempel. 1771.
- I voti d'Imeneo: cantata (in Italian). Forlì: Barbiani. 1812.
- La Giuditta: canti (in Italian). Parma: Giambattista Bodoni. 1813.
- All'immortale Pio VII (in Italian). Parma: Giambattista Bodoni. 1815.
