= Minuscule 358 =

Greek manuscript

- New Testament manuscript
- Name: Mutinensis II
- Text: Gospels
- Date: 14th century
- Script: Greek
- Now at: Biblioteca Estense
- Size: 15.3 cm by 12.5 cm
- Type: Byzantine text-type
- Category: V
- Note: full marginalia

Minuscule 358 (in the Gregory-Aland numbering), ε 148 (Soden), is a Greek minuscule manuscript of the New Testament, on parchment. Paleographically it has been assigned to the 14th century. It is known as Codex Mutinensis II. It has full marginalia

== Description ==
The codex contains a complete text of the four Gospels on 203 parchment leaves (15.3 cm by 12.5 cm). It is written in one column per page, in 21 lines per page.

The text is divided according to the κεφαλαια (chapters), whose numbers are given at the margin, and their τιτλοι (titles of chapters) at the top of the pages. There is also a division according to the Ammonian Sections (in Mark 233 Sections - last in 16:8), with references to the Eusebian Canons.

It contains tables of the κεφαλαια (tables of contents) before each Gospel, and subscriptions at the end of each Gospel. Lectionary markings at the margin and incipits were added by a later hand.

== Text ==
The Greek text of the codex is a representative of the Byzantine text-type. Aland placed it in Category V. According to the Claremont Profile Method it belongs to the textual family K^{x} in Luke 1, Luke 10, and Luke 20. It creates pair with Minuscule 360.

== History ==
The manuscript was added to the list of New Testament manuscripts by Scholz (1794–1852). It was examined by Burgon. C. R. Gregory saw it in 1886.

The manuscript is currently housed at the Biblioteca Estense (G. 9, a.U.2.3 (II A 9)) in Modena.

== See also ==
- List of New Testament minuscules
- Biblical manuscript
- Textual criticism
