= Vicino da Ferrara =

Italian painter (1432–1509)

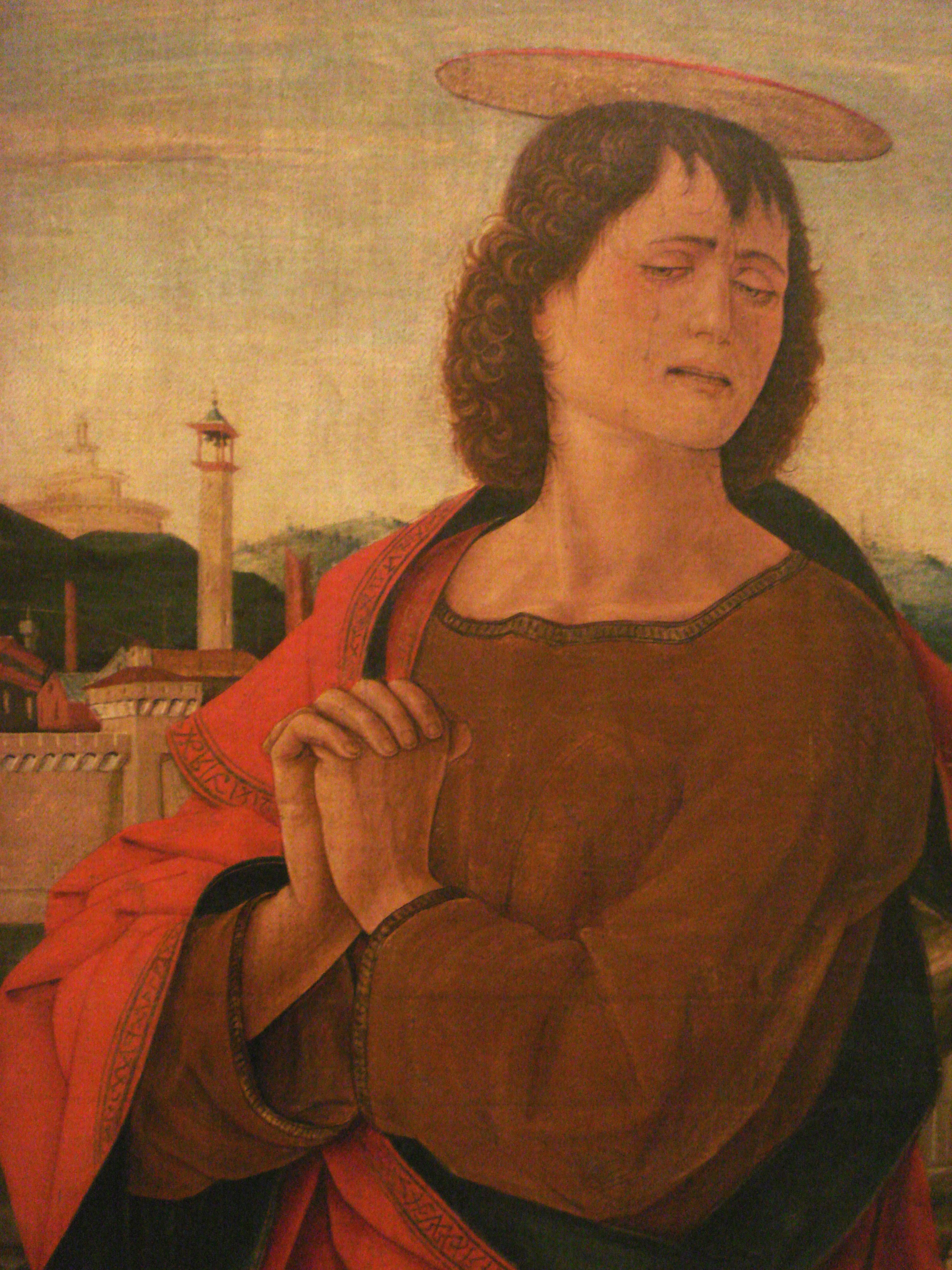
Saint-John in Crucifixion (detail), 1469–70

Vicino da Ferrara (1432–1509) was an Italian Renaissance painter. He is suspected to be identical to Baldassare d'Este from Reggio Emilia, also known as Baldassare da Reggio.

== Gallery ==
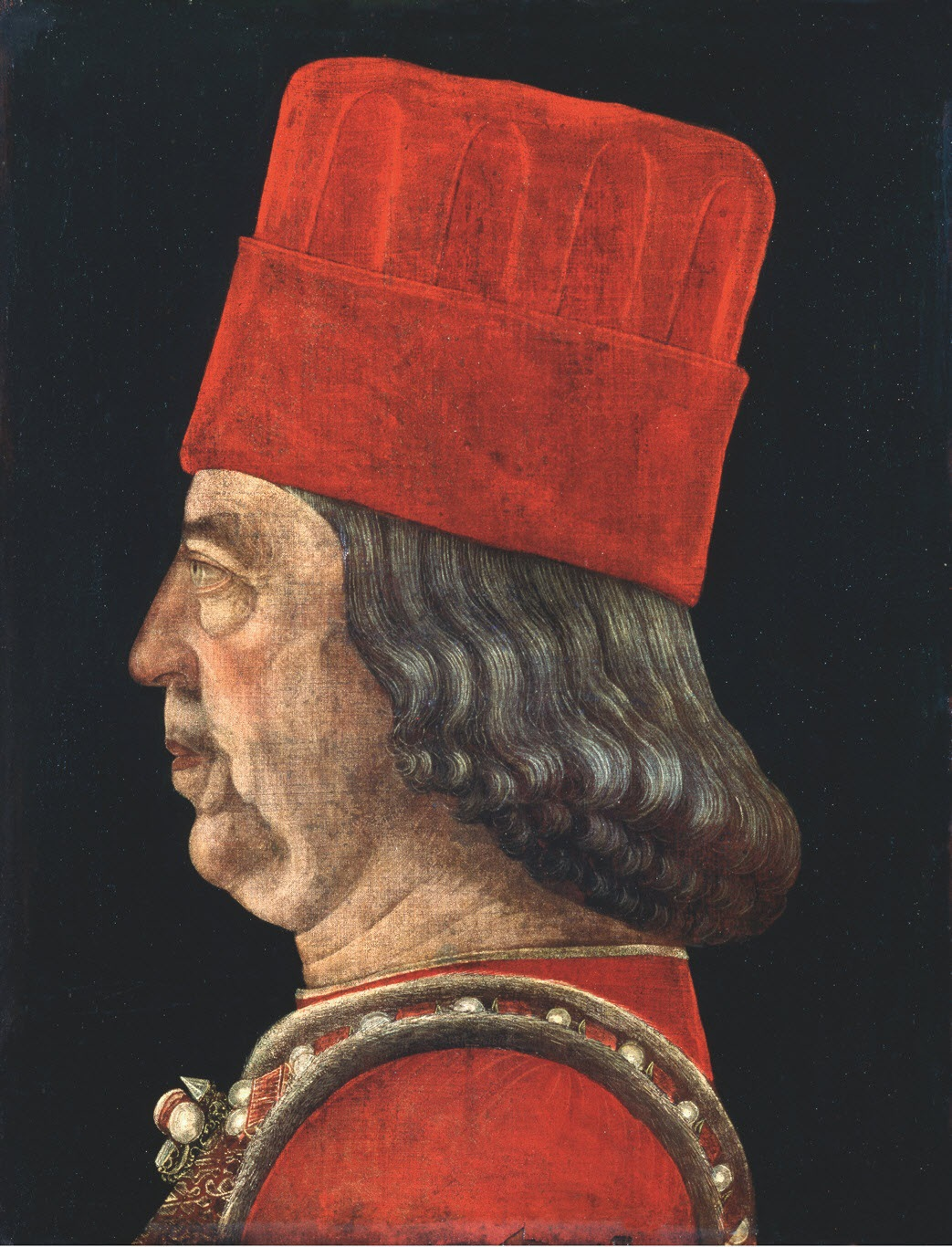
Portrait of Borso d'Este, attributed to Vicino da Ferrara. Pinacoteca of the Sforza Castle in Milan, Italy.
