= De Blasis =

De Blasis is a surname. Notable persons with that surname include:

- Celeste De Blasis (1946–2001), American author of historical romance novels
- Elisabetta De Blasis (born 1974), Italian politician
- Pablo de Blasis (born 1988), Argentine professional footballer

== See also ==
- Blasis
- Di Blasi
- De Blasio
