= Minuscule 359 =

- New Testament manuscript
- Name: Mutinensis 242
- Text: Gospels
- Date: 13th century
- Script: Greek
- Now at: Biblioteca Estense
- Size: 18.5 cm by 13.5 cm
- Type: Byzantine text-type
- Category: V
- Note: marginalia

Minuscule 359 (in the Gregory-Aland numbering), ε 317 (Soden), is a Greek minuscule manuscript of the New Testament, on paper. Palaeographically it has been assigned to the 13th century. It has marginalia. It was known as Codex Mutinensis 9.

== Description ==
The codex contains a complete text of the four Gospels on 310 paper leaves (18.5 cm by 13.5 cm). It is written in one column per page, in 19 lines per page.

The text is divided according to the κεφαλαια (chapters), whose numbers are given at the margin, and their τιτλοι (titles of chapters) at the top. There is also a division according to the Ammonian Sections, (references to the Eusebian Canons were added by a later hand).

It contains the Epistula ad Carpianum, Eusebian Canon tables, Prolegomena, lectionary markings at the margin (for liturgical use), incipits, Synaxarion, and Menologion.

== Text ==
The Greek text of the codex is a representative of the Byzantine text-type. Hermann von Soden classified it to the textual family K^{x}. Aland placed it in Category V. According to the Claremont Profile Method it represents textual family K^{x} in Luke 1, Luke 10, and Luke 20.

== History ==
The manuscript was added to the list of New Testament manuscripts by Scholz (1794–1852). It was examined by Burgon. C. R. Gregory saw it in 1886.

The manuscript is currently housed at the Biblioteca Estense (G. 242, a.T.7.23 (III B 16)) in Modena.

== See also ==
- List of New Testament minuscules
- Biblical manuscript
- Textual criticism
