= Minuscule 585 =

- New Testament manuscript
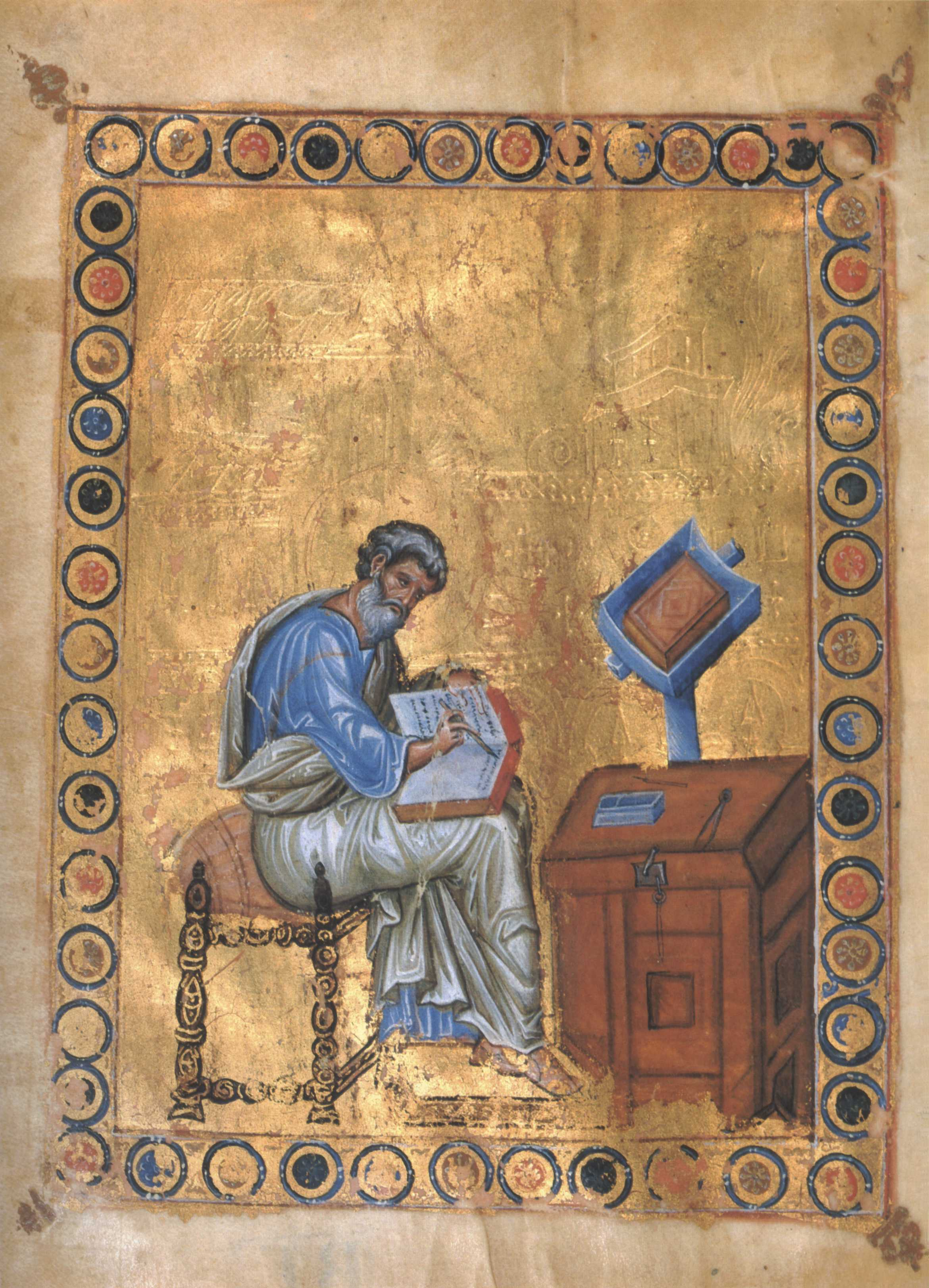
- Folio 11v, Portrait of Matthew
- Text: Gospels
- Date: 10th century
- Script: Greek
- Now at: Biblioteca Estense
- Size: 18.4 x 11.7
- Type: Byzantine text-type
- Category: V
- Note: member of the family Family K^{x}

Minuscule 585 (in the numbering Gregory-Aland) ε 125 (von Soden) is an illuminated Byzantine Gospel Book. It is dated paleographically to the late 10th century.

== Description ==
The manuscript contains the four Christian Gospels. Originally there were Evangelist portraits at the beginning of each Gospel, but the portrait of Luke is lost. The text is written on 300 parchment leaves, in one column per page, 20 lines per page.

The tables of the κεφαλαια (tables of contents) are placed before every Gospel, numerals of the κεφαλαια (chapters) are given at the margin, and their τιτλοι (titles) at the top of the pages. There is also a division according to the Ammonian Sections (in Mark 233 Sections, the last in 16:8), with a references to the Eusebian Canons (written below Ammonian Section numbers). It contains liturgical books (Synaxarion, Menologion) and portraits of the Evangelists.

The manuscript is an example of the art during the Macedonian Renaissance.

== Text ==
The Greek text of the codex is a representative of the Byzantine text-type. Aland placed it in Category V. Hermann von Soden classified it to the textual family Family K^{x}. It was examined by the Claremont Profile Method.

== History ==
It is dated by the INTF to the 10th century.

The manuscript was in Venice in 1560, and was probably purchased by Duke Alfonso II d'Este. It was moved to Vienna in 1589 by Francesco d'Este. In 1868 it was returned to Italy under the provisions of the Convention of Florence.

Currently it is housed at the Biblioteca Estense (Gr. I) at Modena.

== See also ==
- List of New Testament minuscules
- Biblical manuscript
- Textual criticism
