= Lectionary 111 =

Lectionary ℓ 111
- New Testament manuscript
- Text: Evangelistarion
- Date: 9th-century
- Script: Greek
- Now at: Biblioteca Estense
- Size: 24.7 cm by 15.9 cm

Lectionary 111, designated by siglum ℓ 111 (in the Gregory-Aland numbering) is a Greek manuscript of the New Testament, on parchment leaves. Palaeographically it has been assigned to the 9th-century.

== Description ==
The codex contains lessons from the Gospels of John, Matthew, Luke lectionary (Evangelistarium). The text is written in Greek uncial letters, on 228 parchment leaves (24.7 cm by 15.9 cm), in 1 column per page, 21 lines per page. Parchment is thick. It contains musical notes. It contains in the Menology (December 16) the name Queen Theophano, who died in A.D. 892.

== History ==
The manuscript was added to the list of New Testament manuscripts by Scholz. It was examined by Scholz and Burgon. Montfaucon and Burgon dated it to the 8th-century, Scrivener and Gregory to 10th-century (because of Menology), Aland to the 9th-century. Gregory saw the manuscript in 1886.

The manuscript is not cited in the critical editions of the Greek New Testament (UBS3).

Currently the codex is located in the Biblioteca Estense (G. 73, α.W.2.6 (II C 6)) in Modena.

== See also ==
- List of New Testament lectionaries
- Biblical manuscript
- Textual criticism

== Bibliography ==
- Facsimiles of Ancient Manuscripts, ed. E. M. Thompson and others, II (London, 1913–1934), 1, plate 4.
