= Mordecai Leib Bisliches =

Austrian rabbinic scholar (1786–1851)

- Born: 1786; Brody, Habsburg monarchy
- Died: 1851 (aged 64–65)

Mordecai Leib Bisliches (Hebrew: מרדכי ליב בן משה ביסליכיס; 1786–1851) was an Austrian bibliophile and rabbinic scholar.

Bisliches was born in Brody at the end of the eighteenth century. He was married at the age of thirteen, ultimately divorced his wife, and, after the death of his children, went to Paris. There he was very prosperous in business, devoting his leisure to the study and publication of Hebrew manuscripts in the Paris Library. Later he went to Holland and Italy, where he collected a number of Hebrew manuscripts. Returning to his birthplace, he prepared for publication a number of works with the aid of his brother Ephraim.

In 1846 Bisliches and Salomon Gottlieb Stern sold 111 manuscripts in 102 volumes to the Archduchess Marie Louise of Parma, which were added to the De Rossi Collection in the Biblioteca Palatina.

== Publications ==
- Abravanel, Isaac ben Judah (1828). Yeshu'ot Meshiḥo. Carlsruhe.
- Palquera, Shem-Tov (1835). Sefer ha-Nefesh. Lemberg.
- Palquera, Shem-Tov (1837). Moreh ha-Moreh. Presburg: Anton Edler von Schmid. hdl:2027/njp.32101054800295.
- Tibbon, Samuel ben Judah (1837). Ma'amar Yikkavu ha-Mayim. Maamar Jikawu hamaim. Presburg: Anton Edler von Schmid.
- Naḥmanides, Moses (1837). Otzar Neḥmad. Presburg. Ḥiddushim on Shabbat.
- Abba Mari ben Moses of Lunel (1838). Minḥat Ḳena'ot. Minḥat ḳenaʾot. Presburg: Anton Edler von Schmid. hdl:2027/njp.32101076420080.
- Ibn Ezra, Abraham (1838). Sefat Yeter. Presburg. Edited with preface by Meïr Letteris.
- Ha-Palit. Berlin: Hotsa'ot Shmuel ben R. Yehuda Lövenherts. 1850. Catalogue of eighty valuable Hebrew manuscripts in the possession of Bisliches (described by L. Zunz, with additional critical remarks by Senior Sachs).
