= Minuscule 361 =

- New Testament manuscript
- Name: Codex de Rossi 2
- Text: Gospels
- Date: 13th century
- Script: Greek
- Now at: Biblioteca Palatina, Parma
- Size: 10.8 cm by 8 cm
- Type: Byzantine text-type
- Category: V
- Note: member of K^{r}

Minuscule 361 (in the Gregory-Aland numbering), ε 316 (Soden), is a Greek minuscule manuscript of the New Testament, on parchment. Paleographically it has been assigned to the 13th century. It was adapted for liturgical use. It is known as Codex de Rossi 1.

== Description ==
The codex contains the text of the four Gospels on 186 parchment leaves (10.8 cm by 8 cm) with lacunae (Luke 8:14-11:20). It is written in one column per page, in 20 lines per page.

It contains the tables of the κεφαλαια (tables of contents) before each Gospel (with a harmony), lectionary equipment at the margin (for liturgical use), αναγνωσεις (lessons), Synaxarion, Menologion, subscriptions at the end of each Gospel, and numbers of στιχοι.

== Text ==
The Greek text of the codex is a representative of the Byzantine text-type. Hermann von Soden classified it to the textual family K^{r}. Aland placed it in Category V. It belongs to the textual family K^{r} in Luke 1 and Luke 20. In Luke 10 the manuscript is defective.

== History ==
The manuscript once belonged to J. B. de Rossi. The manuscript was added to the list of New Testament manuscripts by Scholz (1794–1852). It was fully described (as also minuscule 360) by De Rossi in his Catalogue. It was examined by Burgon. C. R. Gregory saw it in 1886.

The manuscript is currently housed at the Biblioteca Palatina in Parma (Ms. Parm. 1821).

== See also ==
- List of New Testament minuscules
- Biblical manuscript
- Textual criticism
