= Biblioteca Estense =

Library in Italy

Coordinates: 44.6481°N 10.9211°E

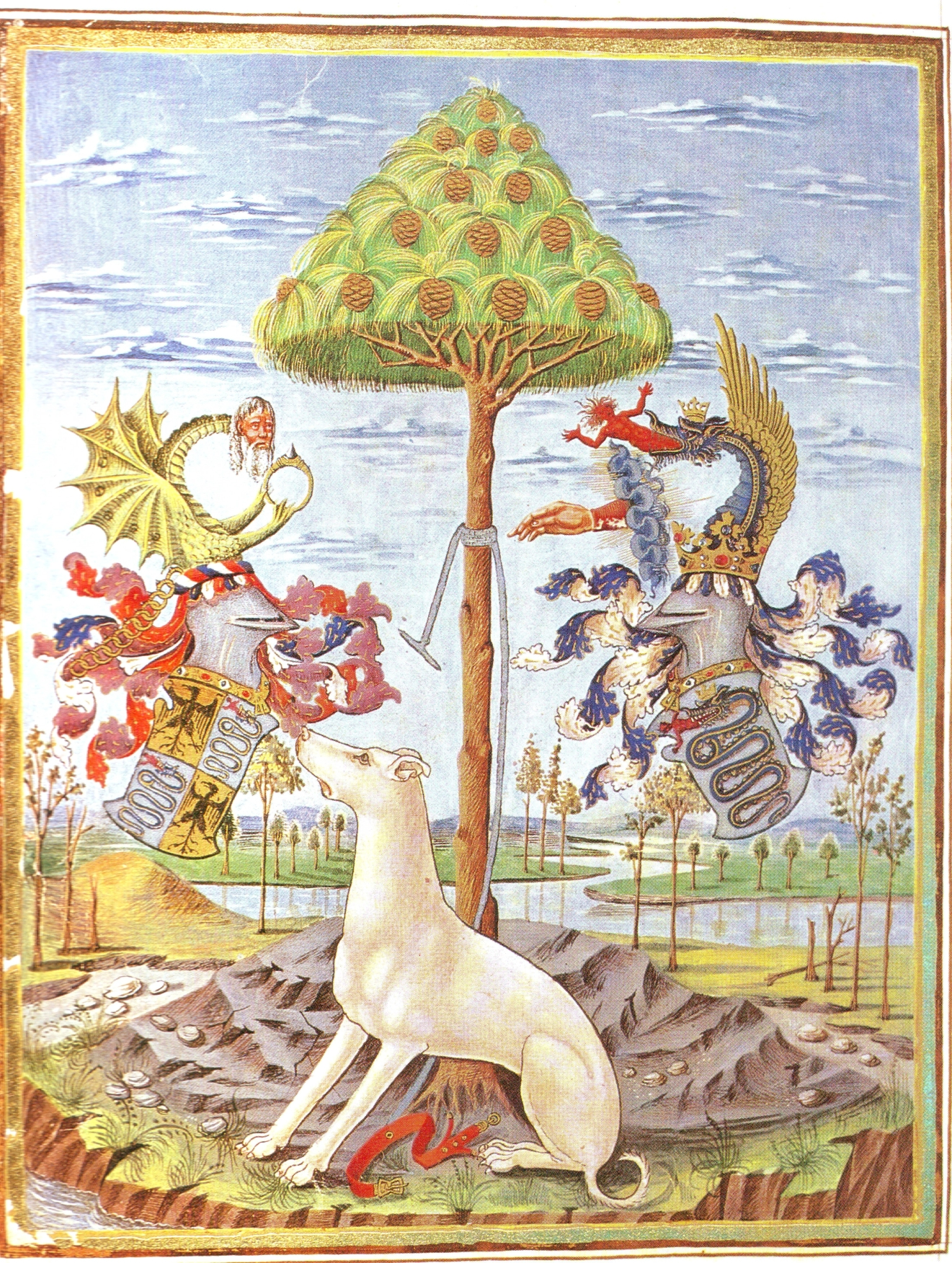
Codex De Sphaera - 1469 Allegory of Este and Sforza (the snake) families Coat of Arms

The Biblioteca Estense (English: Estense Library) was the family library of the marquises and dukes of the House of Este. The exact date of the library's birth is still under speculation, however it is known for certain that the library was in use during the fourteenth century. Whilst it was greatly enriched during the Renaissance years in Ferrara, the library was concretely established in Modena in the beginning of the seventeenth century. It is known as one of the most important libraries in Italy. The library is located, along with the Galleria Estense directly below its collection of artworks, in the Palazzo dei Musei (Piazza Sant'Agostino 337) in Modena.

== History ==
On the ascension of the Marquis Niccolò III d'Este to the Ferrarese duchy in 1393, he inherited an important humanistic library, rich in works of literary, historical and artistic content. Its collection grew considerably during the Renaissance period with manuscripts and printed editions considered today to be of fundamental value, thanks to the refined and attentive patronage of the Este dukes. In 1598, the Library followed the dynasty when the capital was transferred from Ferrara to Modena.

In the following centuries, the Estense Library continued to be enriched with local and international works, funded by the acquisitions of suppressed religious institutions as well as enriched by the elevated tastes of famous librarians Ludovico Antonio Muratori and Girolamo Tiraboschi. After the Unification of Italy, the Estense Library merged with the University Library, which brought with it an important collection of philosophical, juridical and scientific texts. Thus was born the Estense University Library, considered today as a modern institute of national interest.

== Collection ==
Today the Library's collection contains more than 500,000 printed works, about 11,000 codexes, more than 100,000 manuscript leaves, and 1,662 incunabula. Among the manuscripts, the most famous is the 1,200-page Bible of Borso d'Este, extensively bordered with miniatures. The relic would be recovered and returned to Modena following the First World War. Bought at an auction, it was gifted to Italy on behalf of Senator Giovanni Treccani. The Bible is today excluded from public view for reasons of conservation, a 1963 replica now takes its place in the Biblioteca Estense.

The library holds many medieval manuscripts, among them biblical manuscripts: Codex Mutinensis, Minuscule 358, 359, 585, 586, 618, ℓ 111.

Also known worldwide is its collection of musical manuscripts and printed books, the Raccolta musicale estense.

== Some manuscripts ==
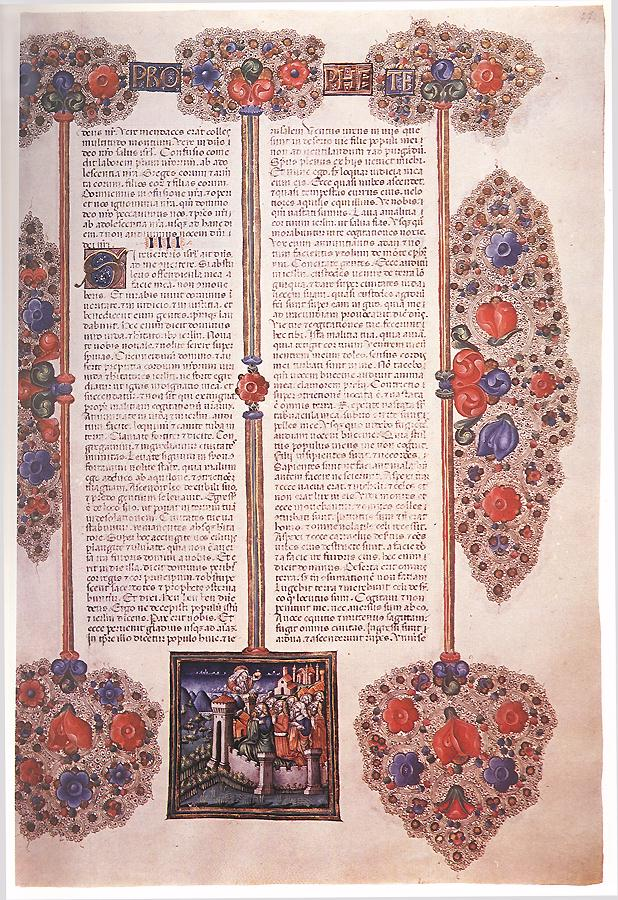
Page from Biblia Borsi Estensis

- Biblia Borsi Estensis
- Codex Mutinensis
- Codex de sphaera
- Mutinensis gr. 122
- Minuscule 585
- Minuscule 586
- Minuscule 358
- Minuscule 359
- Minuscule 618
- Lectionary 111

== Related entries ==
- Gallerie Estensi
- Borso d'Este
- Galleria Estense
- House of Este
