= Franco dei Russi =

Italian painter

Franco dei Russi (Mantua, 15th century) was an Italian painter, active in the field of manuscript illumination.

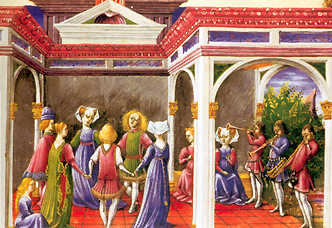
Miniatura from the Bible of Borso d'Este

== Biografia ==
Franco dei Russi was a manuscript illustrator in the Early Renaissance, active above all in Lombardy from 1450 to 1482.

In 1450, he participated in the creation of the Bible of Borso d'Este, considered one of the great Italian projects of illuminated manuscripts. The work took six years (1455–61) by a group of artists guided by Taddeo Crivelli

He also worked in Venice for the library of Federico da Montefeltro in Urbino (1474-1482).
