= Paolo Maria Paciaudi =

Italian Theatine priest, antiquarian, and historian

Reverend Paolo Maria Paciaudi
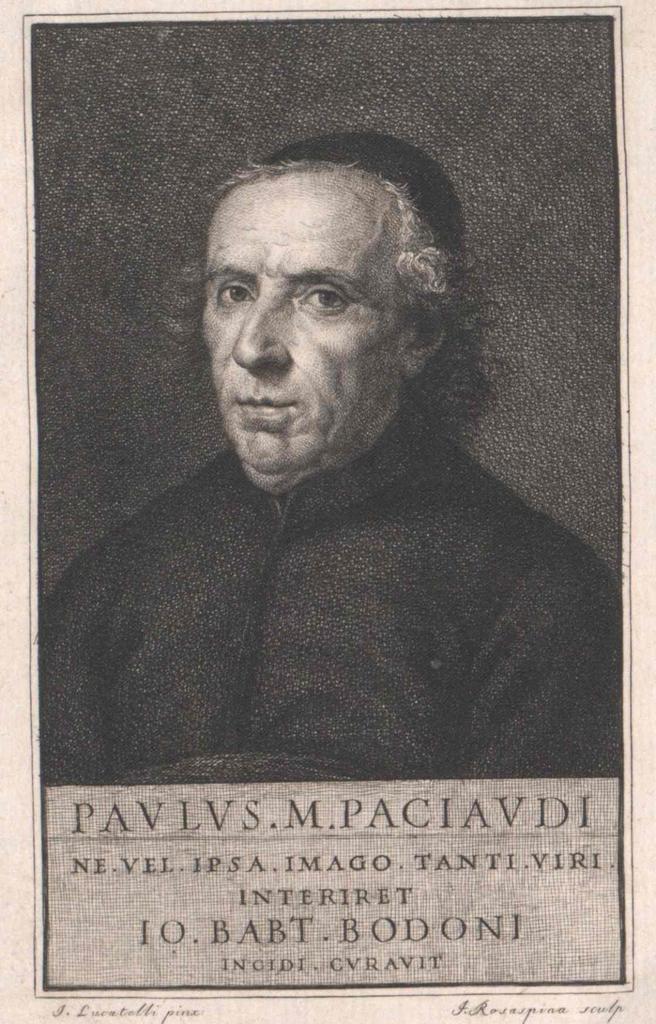
- Engraved portrait of Paolo Maria Paciaudi by Francesco Rosaspina
- Born: 23 November 1710; Turin, Kingdom of Sardinia
- Died: 1 February 1785 (aged 74); Parma, Duchy of Parma
- Occupations: Catholic priest, librarian, philologist, classical archaeologist

Academic background
- Education: University of Bologna
- Academic advisor: Francesco Maria Zanotti

Academic work
- Era: Age of Enlightenment
- Discipline: Classical scholar
- Institutions: Biblioteca Palatina, Parma

Paolo Maria Paciaudi (23 November 1710 – 1 February 1785) was an Italian Theatine priest, antiquarian, and historian.

== Biography ==
Paolo Maria Paciaudi was born in Turin on 23 November 1710. His father was a court physician. At age 18, he moved to Venice to begin his novitiate with the Theatine Order, taking his first vows on 28 August 1729. After completing his novitiate, he studied philosophy, physics, and mathematics at the University of Bologna, where he was influenced by the physicist Francesco Maria Zanotti, who tried to reconcile Aristotelian philosophy with Cartesian and Newtonian physics.

In 1739, Paciaudi was appointed Professor of Philosophy at the Theatine College in Genoa. On 23 June 1745, he became a book censor for the Holy Office under Cardinal Giuseppe Spinelli. In this role, he was authorised to read prohibited books dealing with both secular and ecclesiastical history. In 1750, Paciaudi moved to Rome, where he was appointed Procurator General of the Theatine Order.

On August 1, 1761, Duke Philip of Parma appointed Paciaudi as antiquarian and librarian of the newly founded Biblioteca Palatina. His extensive European connections enabled him to acquire large quantities of books and were instrumental in the development of the library. Paciaudi travelled to various Italian and French cities to gather information on library cataloguing and shelving systems. In 1762 he accompanied the prelate Lenti on a diplomatic mission to Paris, where he befriended Anne Claude de Caylus and Jean-Jacques Barthélemy and acquired numerous books.

Paciaudi also participated in Du Tillot's reforms of the public administration and was tasked with secularizing and modernizing the curriculum of the University of Parma. Under his direction, the Faculty of Law was completely restructured, and the university was equipped with modern scientific tools, including a new botanical garden, an anatomical theater, and specialized chemistry and physics cabinets. In 1763, he also took charge of the archaeological excavations at Veleia.

In 1769, Philip’s son and successor, Ferdinand I of Parma, married Archduchess Maria Amalia of Austria. Influenced by his wife, Ferdinand dismissed du Tillot in 1771 and subsequently reversed many of his reforms. Paciaudi also fell fell from favour when his assistant, the Benedictine monk and librarian Andrea Mazza (1724–1793), accused him of mismanagement and embezzlement. Paciaudi was placed under house arrest for five months at the Convent of Santa Cristina in Parma. Exonerated in 1772, he was awarded an annual pension and settled in Turin. In 1778, Ferdinand recalled him to Parma, where he died in 1785. The Franciscan friar and polymath Ireneo Affò succeeded him as librarian.

Paciaudi corresponded with numerous European scholars, including Comte de Caylus, Barthélémy, Philipp von Stosch, Domenico Silvio Passionei, Pierre-Jean Mariette, Joseph Pellerin, and Antonio Francesco Gori. He helped Gori acquire items for his Museum Etruscum in southern Italy. Paciaudi was well-versed in both philology and archaeology. In his archaeological research, he emphasised the importance of direct, first-hand examination of artefacts. His published works bear witness to his vast scholarship; he wrote on theology, numismatics, epigraphy, and classical archaeology. Of particular significance are the two volumes of Monumenta Peloponnesiaca commentariis explicata, in which he catalogued ancient Greek artworks from Venetian collections. He was a member of several learned societies and academies, including the Académie des Inscriptions et Belles-Lettres in Paris, the Accademia Toscana di Scienze e Lettere, 'La Colombaria', in Florence, the Societas Latina Jenensis in Jena, and the Academia Theodoro-Palatina in Mannheim.

== Main works ==
- De sacris christianorum balneis. Rome: Radiciana. 1750.
- De cultu S. Joannis Baptistæ antiquitates Christianæ. Rome: Palearini. 1755.
- De athletarum κυβιστήσει in palæstra Græcorum commentariolum. Rome: Palearini. 1756.
- Monumenta Peloponnesiaca commentariis explicata. 2 vols. Rome: Palearini. 1761.
- Lettres au comte de Caylus. Paris: Tardieu. 1802.

== Source ==
- This article incorporates public domain material from McClintock, John; Strong, James (1867–1887). Cyclopædia of Biblical, Theological and Ecclesiastical Literature. Harper and Brothers. The entry cites:
  - Fabroni, Vitæ Italorum, vol. 14 s.v.;
  - Leneys, Life of Paciaudi prefixed to his Letters to M. de Caylus;
  - Tipaldo, Biog. degli Italiani illustri, vol. 10, s.v.
