= Salvatore Maria di Blasi =

Italian monk, scholar, and librarian

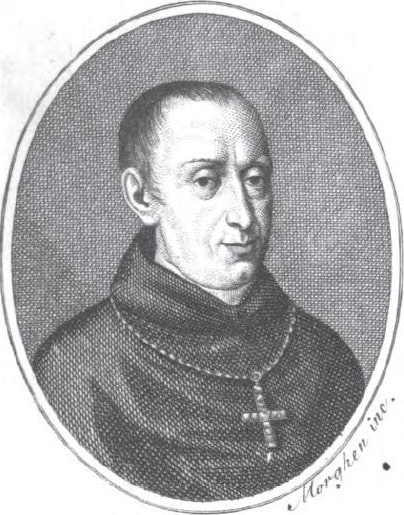
Salvatore Maria Di Blasi

Salvatore Maria Di Blasi (26 December 1719 – 28 April 1814) was an Italian Benedictine monk, scholar, and librarian.

== Biography ==
He was born in Palermo to an aristocratic family. His brother was the erudite Giovanni Evangelista di Blasi. Salvatore studied in seminary, becoming a monk in the Monastery of San Martino alle Scale in Palermo. In 1747, Salvatore founded a scholarly academy, furthered by Giuseppe Antonio de Requesens, Benedictine prior of San Carlo and bishop of Siracusa. He reorganized the library of the San Martino monastery. In 1778, he was called to the Abbey of the Santissima Trinità di Cava, near Salerno, to organize the monastery's important and ancient archive and library. He organized the library that included nearly 60,000 manuscripts including the Dictionarium Cavense compiled by Agostino Venieri between 1595 and 1599. Salvatore wrote a history of the Monastery of San Benedetto di Salerno from its foundation in 793 until 1628. He also wrote Series Principum qui Langobardorum aetate Salerni imperarunt... a vulgari anno 840 ad annum 1077. In Catani, he organized the archive of the monastery of San Nicola l'Arena. Di Blasi made two trips through Italy, the first in 1754, the second in 1778, where he met and later communicated by missive with intellectual throughout the Italian peninsula including Girolamo Tiraboschi, Paolo Maria Paciaudi, Jacopo Facciolati, Giovanni Battista Passeri, and Anton Francesco Gori. Di Blasi died in Palermo.

== Bibliography ==
An bibliography can be found under his entry in the Biografia Siciliana, Giuseppe Mira, Palermo, 1875, pages 109-110.
