= Joseph J. DiBlasi =

American politician

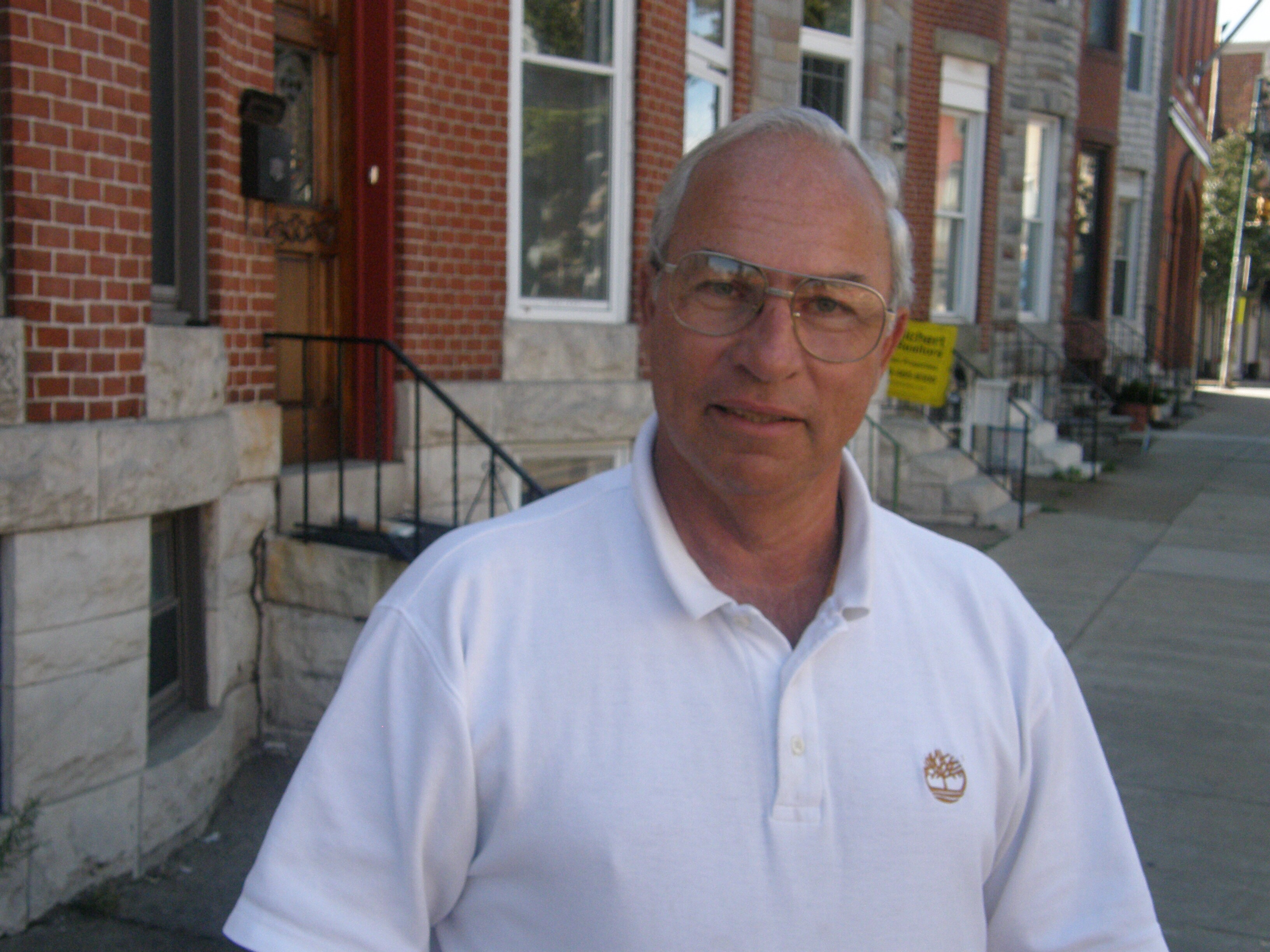

Member of the Baltimore City Council from the 6th District
- In office 1983–1995

Personal details
- Born: Baltimore, Maryland

Joseph J. DiBlasi is an American politician who represented the 6th district in the Baltimore City Council. He is widely known for attending every city council meeting for over 13 years.

== Early life and education ==
DiBlasi was born and raised in South Baltimore, Maryland. He graduated from old Southern High School where he played Varsity Baseball and Basketball, and was a member of the Model Youth City Council class. He is in the Southern High School Hall of Fame along with Al Kaline and Governor Theodore McKeldin. He attended the University of Baltimore where he received a B.S. in Business Management. He is listed in the top 30-ever Alumni at U of B.

== Career ==
DiBlasi, by profession, was a banker for 30 years. He served as a long-time Assistant Comptroller, then as Vice President in Business Development and Non-Profit Banking at Maryland National Bank and NationsBank (now Bank of America). After his time on the Council, DiBlasi became a writer and senior content editor for 17 years, covering varsity sports for Digital Sports. MIAA Sports.net, and the Varsity Sports Network

=== In the council ===
Due to his business banking background DiBlasi was named chairman of the Budget and Appropriations Committee and served in that role until 1991 and used that experience to run on a pro-business platform during the 1995 Baltimore City Council Presidential Election.

He was the Chair of the Budget and Appropriations Committee for many years, and served as Chair of the Professional and Municipal Sports Committee in the Council.

He pionered the legislation and played an integral part in passing the legislation that allowed for construction of Oriole Park at Camden Yards and Ravens' Stadium. He also proposed legislation during the 1994–95 Major League Baseball strike that would have preserved Cal Ripken's consecutive game streak if Major League players were replaced by replacement players.

DiBlasi ran for Council President in 1995 but finished a close second to Lawrence Bell who served one term as president.

=== Since the council ===
Prior to his run for City Council, DiBlasi was a highly successful baseball and basketball coach in South Baltimore, winning numerous championships in the South Baltimore Little League, and a State championship at Saint Mary's Star of the Sea. After his time in the Council, he served as a Commissioner of the Baltimore Municipal and Zoning Appeals Board for seven years. He is currently a Business, Government, and Sports Marketing Consultant. He is a Marketing Consultant for the Babe Ruth Birthplace Museum, a Corporate Business Development representative for the League of Dreams, Maryland, and is the Marketing Director for the Maryland State Athletic Hall of Fame.
