= Minuscule 586 =

- New Testament manuscript
- Text: Gospels
- Date: 14th century
- Script: Greek
- Now at: Biblioteca Estense
- Size: 16.8 cm by 12.5 cm
- Type: Byzantine text-type
- Category: V
- Hand: small and neat

Minuscule 586 (in the Gregory-Aland numbering), ε 417 (von Soden), is a Greek minuscule manuscript of the New Testament, on parchment. Palaeographically it has been assigned to the 14th century. The manuscript is lacunose. It was labeled by Scrivener as 455.

== Description ==
The codex contains the text of the four Gospels on 239 leaves (size 16.8 cm by 12.5 cm) with only one lacuna (Matthew 1:1–20). It is written in one column per page, 20 lines per page, in neat and small hand.

It contains argumentum, lists of the κεφαλαια before every Gospel, numerals of the κεφαλαια at the margin, (not τιτλοι), lectionary markings, incipits, αναγνωσεις (lessons), subscriptions (doubled), στιχοι, liturgical books (Synaxarion and Menologion).

There is not a division according to the Ammonian Sections and the Eusebian Canons; without pictures and decorations. It has one leaf added by a later hand with Gospel Harmony.

== Text ==
The Greek text of the codex is a representative of the Byzantine text-type. Hermann von Soden classified it to the textual family K^{r}. Aland placed it in Category V. According to Wisse's Profile Method it represents the textual family K^{r} in Luke 1, Luke 10, and Luke 20.

== History ==
The manuscript currently housed in at the Biblioteca Estense (G. 5, α M 9. 14 (II A 5)), at Modena.

== See also ==
- List of New Testament minuscules
- Biblical manuscript
- Textual criticism
