= Joseph Blasi =

American economic sociologist

Joseph R. Blasi is an American economic sociologist, currently a Distinguished Professor and the J. Robert Beyster Professor at Rutgers School of Management and Labor Relations. He graduated with an Ed.D. from Harvard University.

== Publications ==
Books by Blasi include:

- The Citizen's Share: Reducing Inequality in the 21st Century (Yale University Press, 2013, with Richard Freeman and Douglas Kruse)
- Shared Capitalism at Work (University of Chicago Press, 2010, with Douglas Kruse and Richard Freeman)
- In The Company of Owners (Basic Books, 2003, with Douglas Kruse and Aaron Bernstein)
- The New Owners (HarperCollins, 1991, with Douglas Kruse)
- Employee Ownership (Harper and Row, 1988)
- A Working Nation (Russell Sage Foundation, 2000, with various co-authors)
