= Biblioteca Palatina, Parma =

Library in Parma, Italy

Palatina Library
- Biblioteca Palatina
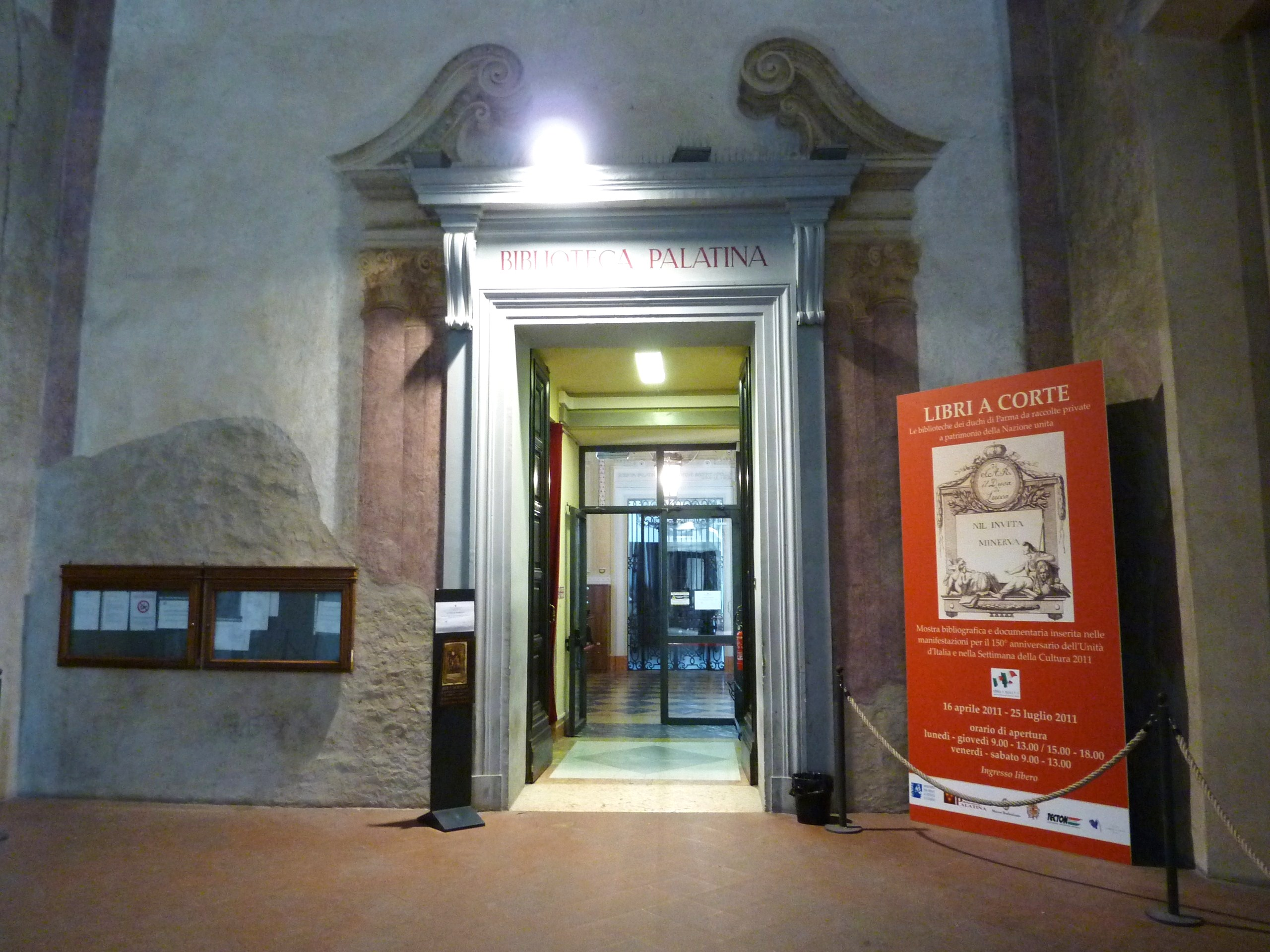
- Entrance of the Biblioteca Palatina
- 44.804579°N 10.325927°E
- Location: Parma, Italy
- Established: 1761

Collection
- Size: 1,379,662 item (2019), 142,419 item (2019), 1,407,002 item (2020), 1,411,749 item (2021), 1,420,367 item (2022), 142,424 item (2022), 848,497 volume, 3,044 item

Other information
- Website: bibpal.unipr.it

The Biblioteca Palatina, or Palatina Library, was established in 1761 in the city of Parma by Philip Bourbon, Duke of Parma. It is one of the cultural institutions housed within the Palazzo della Pilotta complex in the center of Parma. The library was named after the ancient 'Apollus Palatinus'.

The Palatina Library holds the largest collection of Hebrew manuscripts in Italy, and one of the largest in the world.

== History ==
The first librarian was the Theatine priest Paolo Maria Paciaudi, who was assigned as "Antiquario e Bibliotecario". The goal was to form a public library as part of a project by Duke Filippo's prime minister, Guillaume Du Tillot. The library lacked many of the works that had been collected by the House of Farnese while ruling in Parma, when the future Charles III of Spain, brother of Filippo and who was Duke from 1731 to 1735, moved the local library and archives to Naples in 1736.

Paciaudi failed to acquire the collections of Cardinal Domenico Passionei in Roma and of the Pertusati family of Milan, and thus embarked on shopping for books in the market. He catalogued his purchases under six main classes: Theology, Nomology, Philosophy, History, Philology, and Liberal and Mechanic Arts. The books required the importation of Louis Antoine Laferté, a master book binder.

The collection was kept in a gallery refurbished for the purpose by the court architect, Ennemond Alexandre Petitot, and inaugurated in 1769. In 1771, both Du Tillot and Paciaudi fell out of favor, and the library fell under the supervision of the Benedictine Andrea Mazza. However, Paciaudi was recalled from 1778 till his death in 1785 to his former office.

Paciaudi was replaced by the polymath cleric Ireneo Affò; he presided over expansion into the Galleria dell'Incoronata. When Affò died in 1797, he was replaced by former Jesuit priest Matteo Luigi Canonici, until 1805.

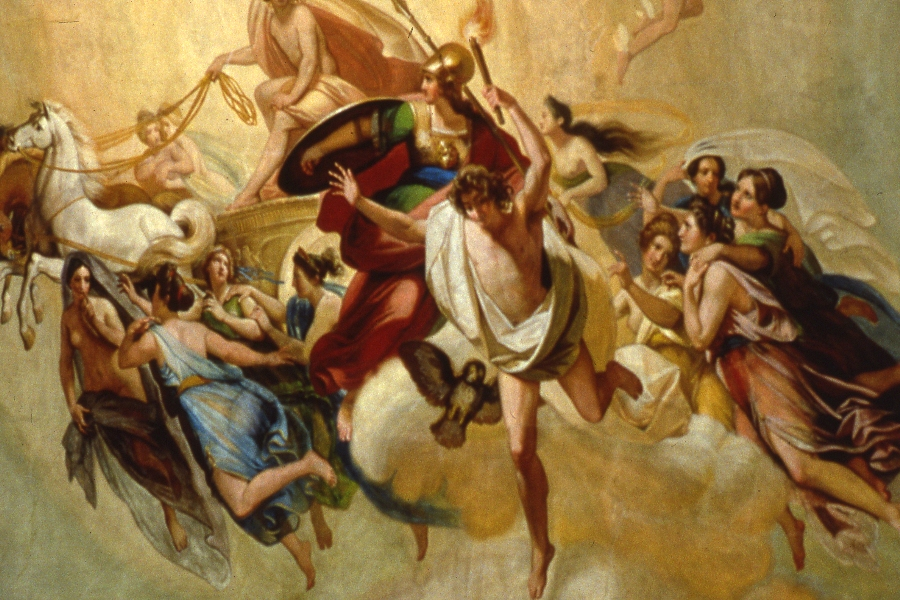
Prometheus steals the fire from Minerva, ceiling fresco by Scaramuzza

In 1804, the Napoleonic administration of the Duchy named Angelo Pezzana as director, a post he held till 1862. Pezzana catalogued the books under five classes: Theology, Jurisprudence, Science & arts, Belle-Lettere (Fine Literature), and History.

Under his management, the library acquired the collections of the Hebraist professor, abate Giovanni Bernardo De Rossi; the manuscripts of Francesco Albergati Capacelli; the Carte of Monsignor Casapini; the collections of designs and engravings belonging to Massimiliano Ortalli and canon Raffaele Balestra; the collection of Judaica and Hebrew manuscripts sold by Salomon Stern and Mordecai Bisliches; and collections of Bartolomeo Gamba, Michele Colombo, and Giovanni Bonaventura Porta; as well as the typographic/printed artifacts of Giovanni Battista Bodoni (now gathered in the adjacent Museo Bodoni in the Palazzo Pilotta.

The ceiling of the Sala Dante was frescoed (1841–1857) by Francesco Scaramuzza. The next librarians included Federico Odorici (1862–1876) and Luigi Rossi (1888–1893).

During the Italian Campaign of the Second World War, in March and April 1944 the RAF bombed Parma. The main targets were Parma's train station and marshalling yards, but the high altitude bombing was often inaccurate and many of Parma's historic buildings were damaged, among them the Biblioteca Palatina. Some 21,000 volumes of the library's collection were lost. In 1950, this loss was partly made up for by copies made from books in the library of Mario Ferrarini.

== Collection ==
Today the Library's collection contains more than 708,000 printed works, about 6620 manuscripts, and 3042 incunabula, and 52,470 graphic prints. There is a unique musical section of 93,000 books. The music section was established in 1889. The electronic catalogue of the Palatina was started in 1994.

The library holds some medieval manuscripts, among them the biblical manuscripts 360 and 361.
