= Ireneo Affò =

Italian art historian, writer, numismatist and Franciscan friar

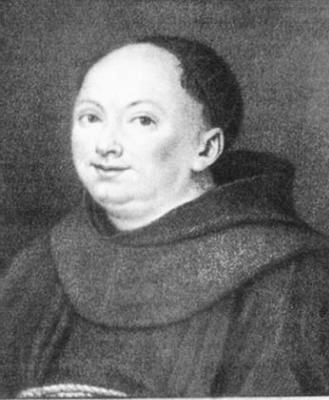
- Irenaeus Affò c. 1780
- Born: 10 December 1741; Busseto, Parma, Italy
- Died: 14 May 1797 (aged 55); Busseto, Parma, Italy
- Occupations: Christian monk; Scholar; Historian; Librarian
- Parent(s): Pietro Affò and Francesca Affò (née Dalle Donne)

Academic work
- Discipline: Italian scholar, Art historian, Historian of literature, Numismatist
- Institutions: Biblioteca Palatina, Parma; University of Parma

Ireneo Affò (born Davide, 10 December 1741 – 14 May 1797) was an Italian art historian, writer, numismatist and Franciscan friar.

== Life ==
Affò was born in Busseto. He was inclined towards drawing and poetry and studied at the workshop of the painter and sculptor, Pietro Balestra. After a short time, he began pursuing studies in fine arts.

In his youth, Affò entered the Franciscan order. He continued to pursue his writing, which included poetry. He began to cultivate the study of learning, conducting extensive historical research of Italy and the surrounding area.

Ferdinand, Duke of Parma sent Affò to serve as a professor of philosophy at Guastalla in 1768, where he oversaw the publication of two ancient codices, including Angelo Poliziano's Orpheus, and the newly discovered archive of the Holy Spirit in Reggio Emilia. He then edited the critical edition of poetic works of St. Francis of Assisi. His major work in the literary field is still represented by the first five volumes of Memoirs of writers and scholars of Parma (1789 – 1797). While at Guastalla, Affò wrote his History of the city and duchy of Guastalla. He wrote also, History of Parma, until 1346, as well as other works connected with the ancient history of Italy. Affò's writing became highly respected throughout Italy.

In 1778, Affò was recalled to Parma to become deputy librarian for the court. In 1785, he became director of the Palatine Library in that city and later became historiographer of the Journal of the Duchy and honorary Professor of History at the university. While his writing covered a wide variety of subjects, his research was accurate and valued at the library. In 1792, Affò began publishing the four volumes of the History of Parma.

He died at the age of 56, in the convent of Busseto, when he contracted typhus fever. He left a manuscript History of Peter Louis Farnese. Girolamo Tiraboschi often quotes his works. His Poetical Dictionary and Memoirs, as well as other pieces are inserted in the Raccolta Ferrarese di Opuscoli.

== Writings ==
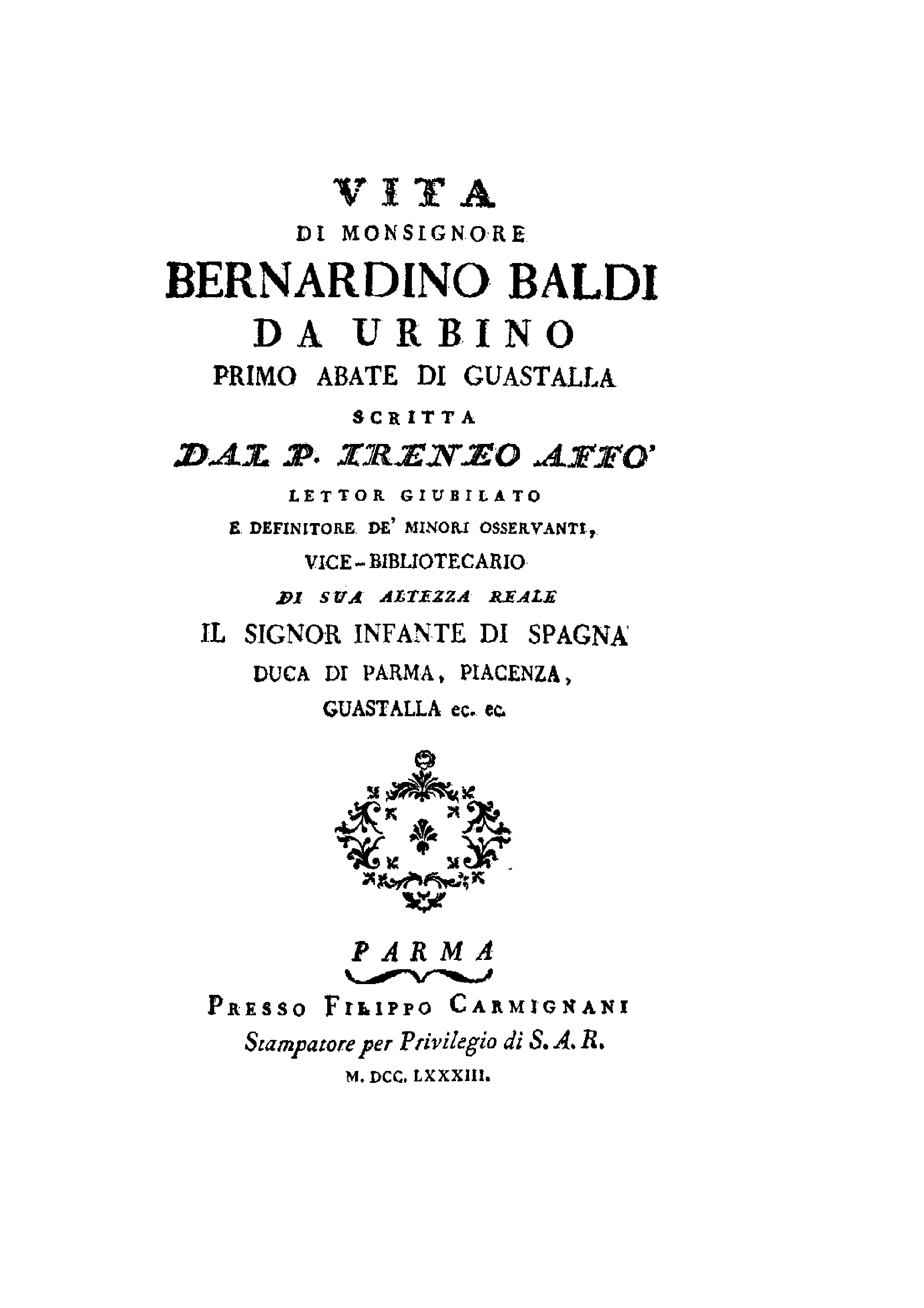
Vita di monsignore Bernardino Baldi da Urbino, 1783

- Ireneo Affò (1781), Memorie di Taddeo Ugoleto Parmigiano, Bibliotecario di Mattia Corvino, rè di Ungheria, Parma: Stamperia reale (Biography of the librarian of Matthias Corvinus, King of Hungary.)
- Ireneo Affò (1780), Vita di Luigi Gonzaga, detto Rodomonte, Principe del Sacro Romano Impero, Parma: Presso Filippo Carmignani
- Ireneo Affò (1783), Vita di Monsignore Bernardino Baldi da Urbino, primo abate di Guastalla, Parma: Presso Filippo Carmignani (Biography of Bernardino Baldi, first abbott of Guastalla)
- Ireneo Affò (1779), Vita di Baldassare Molossi da Casalmaggiore detto Tranquillo, eccelento poeta latino, Parma: Presso Filippo Carmignani
- Ireneo Affò (1821), Vita di Pier Luigi Farnese, primo duca di Parma, Piacenta e Guastalla, Milan: Presso Paolo Emilio Giusti Stampatore, Librajo, e Fonditore nella contrada di Santa margherita No. 1118 e 1120 (Biography of Pier Luigi Farnese, Duke of Parma.)
- Ireneo Affò (1780), Vita del Cavaliere Bernardino Marliani, Mantovano, Parma: Presso Filippo Carmignani (Cavaliere Bernardino Marliani)
- Ireneo Affò (1774), Antichità e Pregi della Chiese Guastallese. Ragionamento storico-critico, Parma: Stamperia Reale
- Ireneo Affò (Le Père) (1784), Vita del graziosissimo pittore Francesco Mazzola, detto il Parmigiano, Parma: Presso Filippo Carmignani (Biography of Francesco Mazzola, Parmigianino)
- Ireneo Affò (1784), Vita del beato Orlando de Medici, eremita : colla storia del culto già da quattro secoli prestatogli in Busseto ovvero riposa il venerabile suo corpo, Parma: Stamperia Reale (Live of the Blessed Orlando de Medici, and cult of his relics)
- Ireneo Affò (1780), Vita di Vespasiano Gonzaga, Duca di Sabbioneta and Trajetto, Marchese di Ostiano, Conte di Rodigo, Fondi, etc., Parma: Presso Filippo Carmignani (Biography of Vespasiano I Gonzaga)
- Ireneo Affò (1794) Ragionamento Del Padre, Parma: Dalla Stamperia Carmignani. Dedicated to Clothilde Tambroni.
- Ireneo Affò (1795), Storia della città di Parma, Tomo Quarto, Parma: Stamperia Carmignani (History of Parma)
