= Codex Mutinensis =

Uncial 014
- New Testament manuscript
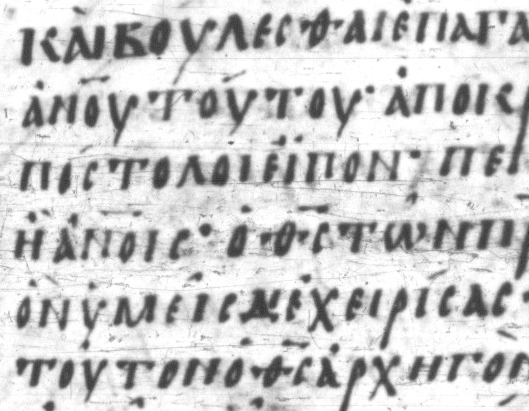
- Name: Mutinensis
- Sign: H^{a}
- Text: Acts of Apostles
- Date: 9th century
- Script: Greek
- Now at: Biblioteca Estense
- Size: 33.2 cm by 22.8 cm
- Type: Byzantine text-type
- Category: V

Codex Mutinensis designated by H^{a} or 014 (in the Gregory-Aland numbering), α 6 (von Soden), is a Greek uncial manuscript of the Acts of Apostles, dated paleographically to the 9th century. The codex contains 43 parchment leaves (33 cm by 23 cm).

== Description ==
The codex contains the book of Acts, with major lacunae (Acts 1:1-5:28, 9:39-10:19, 13:36-14:3, 27:4-28:31). The first three lacunae have been supplied by a later minuscule hand, the fourth by an uncial hand. The text measures 33.2 cm by 22.8 cm. It is marked with breathings and accents, and is written in a single column, with 30 lines per page. Each line is 36 letters long. The uncial letters lean to the right.

It contains prolegomena, subscriptions at the end of the book, numbers of στιχοι, Euthalian Apparatus to the Catholic epistles, and prolegomena to the Pauline epistles.

The General epistles and Pauline epistles, were written later in minuscule hand, and now it designated as 2125.

The Greek text of this codex is a representative of the Byzantine text-type. Aland placed it in Category V.

== History ==
The manuscript was examined by Scholz, who collated it loosely. It was collated again by Tischendorf in 1843 and Tregelles in 1846. In 1850 Tischenforf and Tregelles compared their collations for mutual correction.

According to Burgon: "In my judgement... scarcely later".

The codex is located, in the Biblioteca Estense (Gr. 196) in Modena.

== See also ==
- List of New Testament uncials
- Textual criticism
