= Gary Blasi =

American advocate and law professor

Gary L. Blasi is an American lawyer. He is a Professor of Law Emeritus at UCLA, and an active public interest lawyer and advocate in Los Angeles. Regarded as one of the best lawyers in California, he has been recognized for his legal and policy advocacy to end homelessness (particularly among veterans), eradicate slum housing conditions, and improve learning opportunities in substandard schools. His academic research draws on cognitive science and social psychology to better understand such problems as how people understand the causes of problems like homelessness or poverty, how advocates can best deal with the consequences of racial and other stereotypes, and how large bureaucracies can better respond to the needs of poor people and people living with disabilities.

== Education ==
Born in Pratt, Kansas, Blasi grew up in Kansas, Oklahoma and Colorado, attending more than a dozen schools. In 1966, he obtained a B.A. in political science from the University of Oklahoma, where he was the first recipient of the Carl Albert Award. In 1969, he obtained M.A. in political science at Harvard, where he was a Graduate Prize Fellow and Woodrow Wilson Fellow.

== Career ==
Blasi became a lawyer, and ultimately a law professor, without ever attending law school. In 1971, while working nights in an orange juice factory, he began an apprenticeship with the Echo Park Community Law Office in Los Angeles. He took and passed the California bar exam in 1976.

In 1978, he joined the Legal Aid Foundation of Los Angeles, where he led advocacy efforts involving complex litigation in the areas of housing, welfare, homelessness, and redevelopment. He started the Legal Aid Foundation of Los Angeles’ Eviction Defense Center in 1983, which helped more than 10,000 tenants in its first year. In 1984, he launched the Homeless Litigation Team, a coalition of six legal services and public interest firms and health, housing and other service providers, which undertook litigation to address the plight of homeless individuals and families in Los Angeles.

In 1991, Blasi joined the faculty of UCLA School of Law, where he helped found the David J. Epstein Program in Public Interest Law and Policy and teaches clinical and public interest lawyering courses. Blasi and his students have undertaken numerous public interest research and advocacy projects, including investigations concerning conditions in California's public schools, enforcement of the state's anti-discrimination laws, policy approaches to addressing homelessness, and working conditions for Los Angeles taxi drivers, among others. In 2013, he took emeritus status at UCLA.

Blasi has served as Special Counsel to the Opportunity Under Law Initiative at the Public Counsel Law Center and Of Counsel at the Western Center on Law and Poverty.

Professor Blasi is a prominent advocate of the "housing first" approach to addressing chronic homelessness. Under this approach, government entities provide permanent housing to homeless families and individuals coupled with customized supportive services, rather than solely emergency shelters or transitional housing. A number of studies have found the approach to be cost-effective in eradicating homelessness in cities in the U.S. and abroad (see Housing First). Blasi has criticized punitive approaches to homelessness, such as municipal laws that criminalize sleeping in parked cars and enable police to confiscate the property of those sleeping on the street.

== Professional Recognition ==
Blasi was named one of the top 100 lawyers in California in 2007, cited as the "go-to lawyer for community groups in need of advice."

He received the 2012 Humanitarian Award by the American Civil Liberties Union (ACLU) of Southern California. The award was granted for his contribution to a challenge to the Department of Veterans Affairs’ alleged discrimination against severely disabled veterans and misappropriation of land intended to be used solely for their benefit.

In 2013, Blasi received the California State Bar's Loren Miller Legal Services Award. The award is given to one lawyer in California each year for his or her work in extending legal services to the poor.

In 2015, Blasi was named a California Lawyer Attorney of the Year (CLAY) in the public interest category. The award recognized his work as part of a team of lawyers who won the first significant reform in decades of Los Angeles County's General Relief program, which provides assistance to more than 100,000 homeless and indigent people.

In 2016, Blasi was again named a California Lawyer Attorney of the Year (CLAY) in the public interest category. The award recognized his work as part of a team of lawyers who successfully sued the U.S. Department of Veterans Affairs (VA) on behalf of homeless veterans in Southern California, especially those with disabilities, who were being denied access to care that could only be provided if they were housed.

Also in 2016, the Western Center on Law and Poverty awarded the Earl Johnson Equal Justice Award to Professor Blasi, in recognition of his work with the Center and his many contributions to the realization for the poor of equal justice under law.

== Academic Research and Publications ==
Professor Blasi's academic research draws on cognitive science and social psychology to better understand such problems as how people understand the causes of problems like homelessness or poverty, how advocates can best deal with the consequences of racial and other stereotypes, and how large bureaucracies can better respond to the needs of poor people and people living with disabilities. Selected articles and reports by Professor Blasi include:

System Justification Theory and Research: Implications for Law, Legal Advocacy, and Social Justice (with John T. Jost), in Ideology, Psychology, and Law (edited by Jon Hanson, Oxford University Press, 2011). Are Ideal Litigators White? Measuring the Myth of Colorblindness (with Nilanjana Dasgupta, Kumar Yogeeswaran, & Jerry Kang), 7 Journal of Empirical Legal Studies 886-915 (2010).

The Los Angeles Taxi Workers Alliance (with Jackie Leavitt), in Working for Justice: The L.A. Model of Organizing and Advocacy (edited by Ruth Milkman, Joshua Bloom and Victor Narro, Cornell University Press, 2010).

California Employment Discrimination Law and Its Enforcement: The Fair Employment and Housing Act at 50 (with Joseph Doherty), UCLA School of Law Research Paper No. 10-06 (2010). Full Text Framing Access to Justice: Beyond Perceived Justice for Individuals, 42 Loyola Los Angeles Law Review 913-48 (2009).

Lawyers, Clients and the "Third Person in the Room", 56 UCLA Law Review Discourses 1 (2008).

Grassroots Organizing, Social Movements, and the Right to High Quality Education (with Jeannie Oakes, John Rogers, and Martin Lipton), Stanford Journal of Civil Rights and Civil Liberties 339 (2008).

Default Discrimination: Law, Science, and Unintended Discrimination in the New Workplace, in Behavioral Analyses of Workplace Discrimination (edited by G. Mitu Gulati and Michael Yelnosky, Kluwer, 2007). System Justification Theory and Research: Implications for Law, Legal Advocacy, and Social Justice (with John T. Jost), 94 California Law Review 1119-68 (2006).

Accountability for Adequate and Equitable Opportunities to Learn (with Jeannie Oakes and John Rogers), in Holding Accountability Accountable: What Ought to Matter in Public Education (edited by Ken Sirotnick, Teachers College Press, 2004).

Fifty Years after Brown v. Board: Five Principles for Moving Ahead, 19 Berkeley Women's Law Journal 443-51 (2004). Reprinted in 15 Berkeley La Raza Law Journal 115-23 (2004); 2 Asian Law Journal 324 (2004); and 6 African-American Law and Policy Report 242 (2004).

How Much Access? How Much Justice?, 73 Fordham Law Review 865–81

Reforming Educational Accountability, in California Policy Options 2002 (UCLA Anderson Forecast and UCLA School of Public Policy and Social Research, 2002). Implementation of AB633: A Preliminary Assessment, A report for a Joint Committee of the Legislature, (2001).

Advocacy and Attribution: Shaping and Responding to Perceptions of the Causes of Homelessness, in 19St. Louis University Public Law Forum 207 (2000). Reprinted in Representing the Poor and Homeless: Innovations in Advocacy (edited by Sidney D. Watson, American Bar Association, Commission on Homelessness & Poverty, 2001).

Advocacy Against the Stereotype: Lessons from Cognitive Psychology, 49 UCLA Law Review 1241-81 (2002). Reprinted in 18 Civil Rights Litigation and Attorney Fees Annual Handbook (edited by Steven Saltzman et al., Clark Boardman Callaghan, 2002).
