= Giovanni Evangelista Di Blasi =

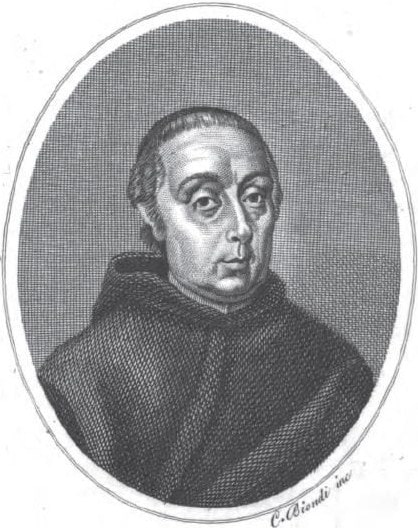
Giovanni Evangelista Di Blasi

Giovanni Evangelista Di Blasi (25 July 1721 – 1812) was an Italian Benedictine monk, philosopher, historian and writer.

Born in Palermo, he began studying in the monastery of San Martino in Naples, then studied in the college of Sant'Anselmo in Rome, and finally studied physics in Florence. He taught philosophy at San Severino Monastery in Naples. He was the brother of the librarian and historian Salvatore Maria Di Blasi.
