= Giovanni Treccani =

Italian industrialist, publisher, and politician

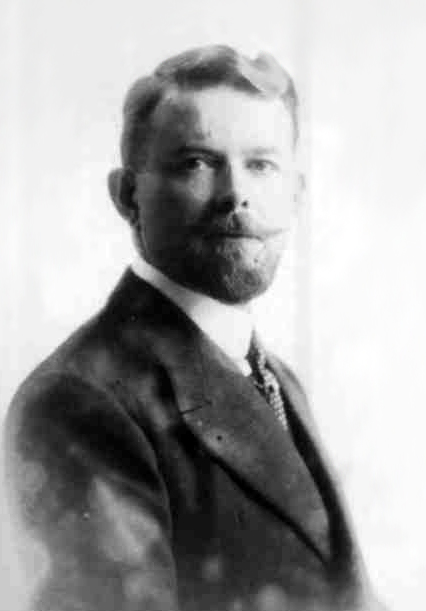
- circa 1923
- Born: 4 March 1883; Montichiari, Italy
- Died: 6 July 1961 (aged 78); Milan, Italy
- Occupations: industrialist, publisher
- Known for: cultural patronage; Enciclopedia Italiana

Giovanni Treccani (Italian pronunciation: [dʒoˈvanni trekˈkaːni]; 3 January 1877 – 6 July 1961) was an Italian textile industrialist, publisher and cultural patron. He sponsored the Giovanni Treccani Institute, established 18 February 1925 to publish the Enciclopedia Italiana (currently best known with his own name, Enciclopedia Treccani).

Treccani was the son of a pharmacist. At the age of 17, he emigrated to Germany to work as a textile worker. In 1924, he became a Senator of Italy. In 1925 work started on the Italian Encyclopedia Institute. In 1937 he was awarded the title of Count, and in 1939 received a degree honoris causa in literature from the University of Milan.
