= List of New Testament minuscules (2001–) =

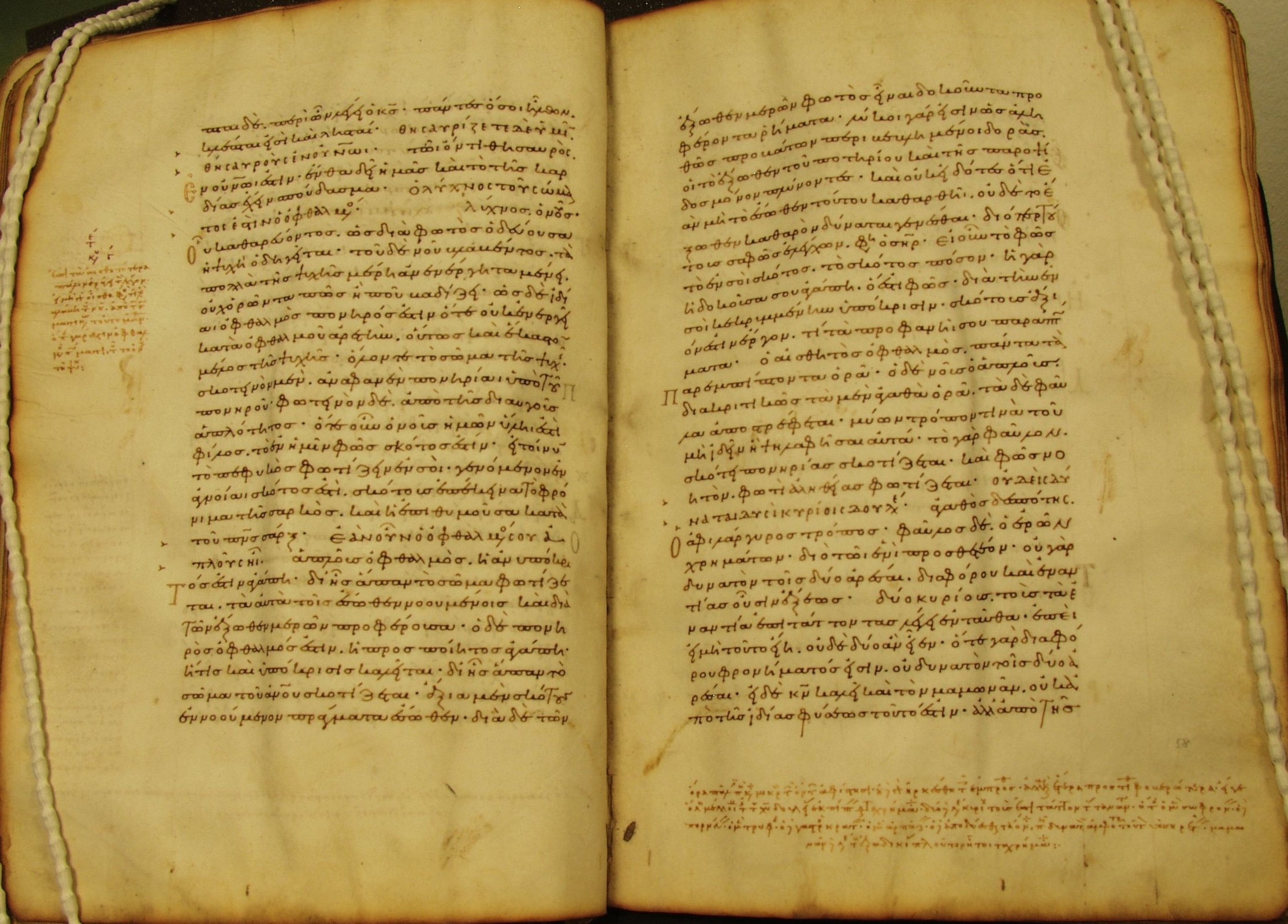
Folio 64 of Minuscule 2755

A New Testament minuscule is a copy of a portion of the New Testament written in a small, cursive Greek script (developed from Uncial).

Below is the list of New Testament minuscules 2001 to the remaining registered minuscules. For other related lists, see:

- Lists of New Testament minuscules
- List of New Testament minuscules (1–1000)
- List of New Testament minuscules (1001–2000)

== Legend ==
- The numbers (#) are the now standard system of Caspar René Gregory, often referred to as the Gregory–Aland numbers.
- Included among the cataloged minuscules are the following types of manuscripts, color coded:

Grey represents continuous text manuscripts containing only New Testament portions
Beige represents manuscripts with New Testament portions and a catena (quotations from church fathers)
Light cyan represents manuscripts of single-author commentaries who included the full Scripture text.
Light red represents manuscripts of single-author commentaries who included both the full Scripture text and a catena.
Light purple represents manuscripts of commentaries where the Scripture text was abridged.
White represents manuscript numbers no longer in use.

- Dates are estimated to the nearest 100 year increment where specific date is unknown.
- Content generally only describes sections of the New Testament: Gospels, The Acts of the Apostles (Acts), Pauline epistles, and so on. Sometimes the surviving portion of a codex is so limited that specific books, chapters or even verses can be indicated. Linked articles, where they exist, generally specify content in detail, by verse.
- Digital images are referenced with direct links to the hosting web pages, with the exception of those at the INTF. The quality and accessibility of the images is as follows:

Gold color indicates high resolution color images available online.
Tan color indicates high resolution color images available locally, not online.
Light tan color indicates only a small fraction of manuscript pages with color images available online.
Light gray color indicates black/white or microfilm images available online.
Light blue color indicates manuscript not imaged, and is currently lost or ownership unknown.
Light pink color indicates manuscript destroyed, presumed destroyed, or deemed too fragile to digitize.
Violet color indicates high resolution ultraviolet images available online.

† Indicates the manuscript has damaged or missing pages.
^{P} Indicates only a portion of the books were included.
^{S} Indicates lost portions of manuscript replaced via supplement of a later hand.
^{abs} (abschrift) Indicates manuscript is copy.
[ ] Brackets around Gregory–Aland number indicate the manuscript belongs to an already numbered manuscript, was found to not be a continuous text manuscript, was found to be written in modern Greek versus Koine Greek, was proved a forgery, or has been destroyed.

== Minuscules 2001–2100 ==
#	Date	Contents	Pages	Institution and refs.	City, State	Country	Images
2001	12th	Romans - 2 Corinthians	230	Monastery of Saint John the Theologian, 63	Patmos	Greece	CSNTM
2001	12th	Romans - 2 Corinthians	230	Monastery of Saint John the Theologian, 63	Patmos	Greece	INTF
2002	13th	Theophylact Commentary on 1 Corinthians-Titus	208	Monastery of Saint John the Theologian, 116	Patmos	Greece	CSNTM
2002	13th	Theophylact Commentary on 1 Corinthians-Titus	208	Monastery of Saint John the Theologian, 116	Patmos	Greece	INTF
2003	15th	Pauline epistles †	189	University of Groningen Bibl., Hs. 1	Groningen	Netherlands	INTF
2004	12th	Pauline epistles †	158	Royal Site of San Lorenzo de El Escorial, T. III. 17	San Lorenzo de El Escorial	Spain	INTF
2005	13th	Acts †, Pauline epistles †	100	Royal Site of San Lorenzo de El Escorial, Ψ. III. 2	San Lorenzo de El Escorial	Spain	INTF
2006	10th	Chrysostom Commentary on Romans	256	Vatican Library, Reg.gr.4	Vatican City	Vatican City	DVL, INTF
2007	11th	Pauline epistles†	392	Laurentian Library, Plut.09.10	Florence	Italy	BML, INTF
2008	13th	Zigabenus Commentary on the Pauline Epistles	204	Vatican Library, Vat.gr.636	Vatican City	Vatican City	INTF
2009	16th	Acts †, General Epistles †, Pauline Epistles †	77	Royal Danish Library, Thott. 14, 2°	Copenhagen	Denmark	INTF
2010	14th	Revelation†, 8:23-14:10	8	Trinity College, Ms. 373, p. 151-166 (Ms. 33)	Dublin	Ireland	INTF
2011	12th	Pauline Epistles†	199	National Library, Suppl. Gr. 1264	Paris	France	BnF, INTF
2012	14th	Theodoret Commentary on the Pauline Epistles	195	Library of the Greek Orthodox Patriarchate, Sabas 217	Jerusalem		LOC, INTF, CSNTM
2013	12th	2 Corinthians - 1 Thessalonians†	109	National Library, 138	Athens	Greece	CSNTM
2013	12th	2 Corinthians - 1 Thessalonians†	109	National Library, 138	Athens	Greece	INTF
2014	15th	Andreas of Caesarea Commentary on Revelation	93	Vallicelliana Library, ms.D. 20	Rome	Italy	INTF
2015	15th	Revelation 1:1-17:5†	24	Bodleian Library, MS. Barocci 48, fol. 51-74	Oxford	United Kingdom	DB
2015	15th	Revelation 1:1-17:5†	24	Bodleian Library, MS. Barocci 48, fol. 51-74	Oxford	United Kingdom	INTF
2016	15th	Revelation	24	British Library, Harley MS 5678, fol. 221-244	London	United Kingdom	BL
2016	15th	Revelation	24	British Library, Harley MS 5678, fol. 221-244	London	United Kingdom	INTF
2017	15th	Revelation	16	Saxon State Library, A. 124	Dresden	Germany	SLUB, INTF
2017	15th	Revelation	16	Saxon State Library, A. 124	Dresden	Germany	CSNTM
2018	1300	Andreas of Caesarea Commentary on Revelation	32	Austrian National Library, Theol. gr. 307, fol. 142-173	Vienna	Austria	INTF
2019	13th	Andreas of Caesarea Commentary on Revelation†	56	Victor Emmanuel III National Library, Cod. Neapol. ex Vind. 11	Naples	Italy	INTF
2020	15th	Revelation	25	Vatican Library, Vat.gr.579, fol. 22-46	Vatican City	Vatican City	INTF
2021	15th	Revelation	70	Vatican Library, Reg.gr.68	Vatican City	Vatican City	INTF
2022	14th	Andreas of Caesarea Commentary on Revelation 14:17-18:20	6	Vatican Library, Barb.gr.474, fol. 224-229	Vatican City	Vatican City	INTF
2023	15th	Andreas of Caesarea Commentary on Revelation	59	State Historical Museum, V. 155, S. 66, fol. 405-463	Moscow	Russia	INTF
2024	15th	Revelation	36	State Historical Museum, V. 391, S. 205, fol. 53-88	Moscow	Russia	INTF
2025	15th	Revelation	36	National Library, Grec 19, fol. 91-126	Paris	France	BnF, INTF
2026	15th	Andreas of Caesarea Commentary on Revelation	83	National Library, Supplement Grec 99	Paris	France	BnF, INTF
2027	13th	Revelation†	13	National Library, Grec 491, fol. 281-293	Paris	France	BnF, INTF
2028	1422	Revelation	119	National Library, Grec 239	Paris	France	BnF, INTF
2029	16th	Andreas of Caesarea Commentary on Revelation	294	National Library, Grec 241	Paris	France	BnF, INTF
2030	12th	Revelation^{P}	7	Scientific Library of the State Gorky University, 1, fol. 203-209	Moscow	Russia	INTF
2031	14th	Andreas of Caesarea Commentary on Revelation	111	Vatican Library, Vat.gr.1743	Vatican City	Vatican City	INTF
2032	11th	1 John 4:3-5:3†; Andreas of Caesarea Commentary on Revelation 1:12-2:20, 3:6-6:9, 7:17-9:5, 21:18-22:17†	19	Vatican Library, Vat.gr.1904 II, fol. 264-282	Vatican City	Vatican City	DVL
2032	11th	1 John 4:3-5:3†; Andreas of Caesarea Commentary on Revelation 1:12-2:20, 3:6-6:9, 7:17-9:5, 21:18-22:17†	19	Vatican Library, Vat.gr.1904 II, fol. 264-282	Vatican City	Vatican City	INTF
2033	16th	Andreas of Caesarea Commentary on Revelation	180	Vatican Library, Chig.R.IV.8	Vatican City	Vatican City	INTF
2034	16th	Andreas of Caesarea Commentary on Revelation	97	Library of the National Lincei and Corsinian Academy, Cors. 838 (41.E.37)	Rome	Italy	INTF
2035	16th	Fredericii Venetiani Commentary on Revelation	363	Laurentian Library, Plut.07.09	Florence	Italy	BML, INTF
2036	14th	Andreas of Caesarea Commentary on Revelation	207	Vatican Library, Vat.gr.656	Vatican City	Vatican City	INTF
[2036^{abs}] = 2891							
2037	14th	Andreas of Caesarea Commentary on Revelation	169	Bavarian State Library, Cod.graec. 544	Munich	Germany	BSB, INTF
2038	16th	Andreas of Caesarea Commentary on Revelation	83	Bavarian State Library, Cod.graec. 23, fol. 333-415	Munich	Germany	BSB, INTF
2039	12th	Revelation	16	Owner unknown, (Dresden, Sächs. LB, A 95)	Dresden	Germany	
[2040] = 911							
2041	14th	Revelation	22	British Library, Add MS 39612	London	England	BL
2041	14th	Revelation	22	British Library, Add MS 39612	London	England	INTF
2042	14th	Revelation	27	Victor Emmanuel III National Library, Ms. II. A. 10, fol. 117-143	Naples	Italy	INTF
2043	15th	Andreas of Caesarea Commentary on Revelation	25	National Library of Russia, Gr. 129	Saint Petersburg	Russia	INTF
2044	16th	Andreas of Caesarea Commentary on Revelation	120	Austrian National Library, Theol. gr. 69	Vienna	Austria	INTF
2045	14th	Andreas of Caesarea Commentary on Revelation	83	Austrian National Library, Theol. gr. 163	Vienna	Austria	INTF
2046	16th	Andreas of Caesarea Commentary on Revelation	152	Austrian National Library, Theol. gr. 220	Vienna	Austria	INTF
2047	16th	Andreas of Caesarea Commentary on Revelation	161	National Library, Grec 240	Paris	France	BnF, INTF
2048	11th	Revelation	22	National Library, Coislin 256, fol. 207-228	Paris	France	INTF
[2049]	16th	Revelation copied from a printed edition	23	Hellenic Parliament Library, HPL 45, fol. 232-254	Athens	Greece	CSNTM
[2049]	16th	Revelation copied from a printed edition	23	Hellenic Parliament Library, HPL 45, fol. 232-254	Athens	Greece	INTF
2050	12th	Revelation† 1:1-5:14; 20:1-22:21	7	Royal Site of San Lorenzo de El Escorial, C. III. 6, fol. 235-241	San Lorenzo de El Escorial	Spain	INTF
2051	16th	Andreas of Caesarea Commentary on Revelation	83	National Library, 4750, fol. 303-385	Madrid	Spain	INTF
2052	16th	Andreas of Caesarea Commentary on Revelation† 1:1-4:11; 5:6-7:5	32	Laurentian Library, Plut.07.29, fol. 193-224	Florence	Italy	BML
2053	13th	Oecumenius Commentary on Revelation	138	University Library, 99	Messina	Italy	INTF
2054	15th	Revelation	125	Estense Library, G. 154, a.W.4.21 (III E 1), fol. 122-246	Modena	Italy	INTF
2055	15th	Andreas of Caesarea Commentary on Revelation	63	Estense Library, G. 190, a.V.8.14 (III F 12), fol. 319-381	Modena	Italy	INTF
2056	14th	Revelation	86	Angelica Library, Ang. gr. 57, fol. 1-86	Rome	Italy	IC
2056	14th	Revelation	86	Angelica Library, Ang. gr. 57, fol. 1-86	Rome	Italy	INTF
2057	15th	Revelation	35	Angelica Library, 32, fol. 171-205	Rome	Italy	IC
2057	15th	Revelation	35	Angelica Library, 32, fol. 171-205	Rome	Italy	INTF
2058	14th	Andreas of Caesarea and Oecumenius Commentaries on Revelation	28	Vatican Library, Chig.R.V.33, fol. 44-71	Vatican City	Vatican City	DVL,
2058	14th	Andreas of Caesarea and Oecumenius Commentaries on Revelation	28	Vatican Library, Chig.R.V.33, fol. 44-71	Vatican City	Vatican City	INTF
2059	11th	Andreas of Caesarea Commentary on Revelation	103	Vatican Library, Vat.Gr.370, fol. 149-251	Vatican City	Vatican City	DVL, INTF
2060	1331	Andreas of Caesarea Commentary on Revelation	105	Vatican Library, Vat.Gr.542	Vatican City	Vatican City	INTF
2061	16th	Revelation	11	Vatican Library, Vat.Gr.1190, fol. 174-184	Vatican City	Vatican City	DVL, INTF
2062	13th	Oecumenius Commentary on Revelation	29	Vatican Library, Vat.Gr.1426	Vatican City	Vatican City	INTF
2063	16th	Revelation	114	Vatican Library, Vat.Gr.1976	Vatican City	Vatican City	INTF
2064	16th	Andreas of Caesarea Commentary on Revelation	71	Vatican Library, Vat.gr.2129, p. 17-158 (p. 1-10: l 561)	Vatican City	Vatican City	DVL, INTF
2065	15th	Andreas of Caesarea Commentary on Revelation	144	Vatican Library, Ott.gr.154	Vatican City	Vatican City	DVL
2065	15th	Andreas of Caesarea Commentary on Revelation	144	Vatican Library, Ott.gr.154	Vatican City	Vatican City	INTF
[2066]	16th	Andreas of Caesarea Commentary on Revelation copied from a printed edition	123	Vatican Library, Ott.gr. 283	Vatican City	Vatican City	DVL
[2066]	16th	Andreas of Caesarea Commentary on Revelation copied from a printed edition	123	Vatican Library, Ott.gr. 283	Vatican City	Vatican City	INTF
2067	15th	Andreas of Caesarea Commentary on Revelation	86	Vatican Library, Pal.gr.346	Vatican City	Vatican City	INTF
2068	16th	Revelation	150	Marciana National Library, Gr. I,40 (1377)	Venice	Italy	INTF
2069	15th	Revelation	30	Marciana National Library, Gr. II,54 (981), fol. 1-30	Venice	Italy	INTF
2070	1356	Andreas of Caesarea Commentary on Revelation	58	Skete of Saint Anne, 11, fol. 250-307	Mount Athos	Greece	INTF
2071	1622	Revelation	160	Dionysiou Monastery, 163, fol. 4-163	Mount Athos	Greece	INTF
[2072]	1798	Commentary on Revelation copied from a printed edition.	281	Docheiariou Monastery, 81, p. 13-574	Mount Athos	Greece	INTF
2073	14th	Revelation	157	Iviron Monastery, 34	Mount Athos	Greece	INTF
2074	10th	Andreas of Caesarea Commentary on Revelation	63	Iviron Monastery, 379, fol. 83-145	Mount Athos	Greece	INTF
2075	14th	Revelation	161	Iviron Monastery, 546	Mount Athos	Greece	INTF
2076	16th	Revelation	23	Iviron Monastery, 594, fol. 1-23	Mount Athos	Greece	INTF
2077	17th	Andreas of Caesarea Commentary on Revelation	319	Iviron Monastery, 644	Mount Athos	Greece	INTF
2078	16th	Revelation	22	Konstamonitou Monastery, 29, fol. 375-396	Mount Athos	Greece	INTF
2079	13th	Revelation	45	Konstamonitou Monastery, 107, fol. 115-159	Mount Athos	Greece	INTF
2080	14th	Acts† 1:13-28:31; General Epistles; Pauline Epistles; Revelation† 1:1-22:16	278	Monastery of Saint John the Theologian, 12	Patmos	Greece	INTF
2080	14th	Acts† 1:13-28:31; General Epistles; Pauline Epistles; Revelation† 1:1-22:16	278	Monastery of Saint John the Theologian, 12	Patmos	Greece	CSNTM
2081	11th	Andreas of Caesarea Commentary on Revelation	146	Monastery of Saint John the Theologian, 64	Patmos	Greece	CSNTM
2082	16th	Revelation	21	Saxon State Library, A. 187	Dresden	Germany	SLUB
2082	16th	Revelation	21	Saxon State Library, A. 187	Dresden	Germany	CSNTM
2083	16th	Andreas of Caesarea Commentary on Revelation	113	Leiden University Library, Voss. Gr. Fol. 48, fol. 135-247	Leiden	Netherlands	INTF
2084	15th	Revelation	19	National Library, Taphu 303, fol. 7 v-26 r	Athens	Greece	INTF
2085	1308	Acts, Pauline Epistles, General Epistles	225	Saint Catherine's Monastery, Gr. 277	Sinai	Egypt	LOC, CSNTM
2086	14th	Acts, Pauline Epistles, General Epistles	176	Saint Catherine's Monastery, Gr. 278	Sinai	Egypt	LOC, INTF, CSNTM
2087	15th	Revelation† 3:3-4:8	2	University Library, AN III 12, fol. 97v und 248r	Basel	Switzerland	INTF
[2088]	?	Acts, General Epistles	?	(Manuscript Destroyed)	Zakynthos	Greece	
2089	15th	2 Corinthians^{P} 4:14–7:8, 12:2–13:13	4	National Library, 527, p. 1-4.399-402	Athens	Greece	CSNTM
2090	16th	Excerpts from Pauline Epistles†	14	Ambrosiana Library, N 272 sup.	Milan	Italy	INTF
2091	15th	Andreas of Caesarea Commentary on Revelation† 10:8-21:6	80	National Library, 142, fol. 1-80	Athens	Greece	CSNTM
2091	15th	Andreas of Caesarea Commentary on Revelation† 10:8-21:6	80	National Library, 142, fol. 1-80	Athens	Greece	INTF
2092	18th	Romans - Galatians	?	Esphigmenou Monastery, 94	Mount Athos	Greece	
[2093]	13th	Gospels, Acts, Pauline Epistles, General Epistles	266	(Destroyed?)			
2094	13th	Pauline Epistles^{P}	144	Royal Site of San Lorenzo de El Escorial, Y. II. 20	San Lorenzo de El Escorial	Spain	INTF
2095	13th	Gospels	210	Cambridge University Library, Add. Mss. 3326	Cambridge	United Kingdom	INTF
2096	12th	Matthew †, Mark †, Luke †	158	Hellenic Parliament Library, HPL 44	Athens	Greece	CSNTM
2096	12th	Matthew †, Mark †, Luke †	158	Hellenic Parliament Library, HPL 44	Athens	Greece	INTF
2097	11th	Gospels	289	Hellenic Parliament Library, HPL 4	Athens	Greece	CSNTM
2097	11th	Gospels	289	Hellenic Parliament Library, HPL 4	Athens	Greece	INTF
2098	11th	Luke, John	157	Fitzwilliam Museum McClean Collection, McClean 3	Cambridge	United Kingdom	INTF
2099	13th	Gospels	284	British Library, Add MS 35030	London	United Kingdom	BL
2100	13th	Theophylact Commentary on the Gospels	197	Christ Church, Wake 54	Oxford	United Kingdom	INTF

[top]

== Minuscules 2101–2200 ==
#	Date	Contents	Pages	Institution and refs.	City, State	Country	Images
2101	13th	Zigabenus Commentary on the Gospels	269	Bodleian Library, MS. Barocci 28	Oxford	United Kingdom	DB
2102	15th	Theophylact Commentary on the Pauline Epistles	401	Bodleian Library, MS. Barocci 146, fol. 1-401	Oxford	United Kingdom	DB
2102	15th	Theophylact Commentary on the Pauline Epistles	401	Bodleian Library, MS. Barocci 146, fol. 1-401	Oxford	United Kingdom	INTF
2103	12th	Gospel of John^{P}	94	Bodleian Library, MS. Barocci 225	Oxford	United Kingdom	DB
2104	12th	Theophylact Commentary on the Pauline Epistles†	291	Bodleian Library, MS. E. D. Clarke 42	Oxford	United Kingdom	INTF
2105	14th	Theophylact Commentary on the Pauline Epistles	235	Bodleian Library, MS. Auct. E. 1. 6	Oxford	United Kingdom	INTF
2106	12th	Theophylact Commentary on Mark, John	293	Bodleian Library, Auct. T. 2. 1	Oxford	United Kingdom	INTF
2107	13th	Theophylact Commentary on the Gospels	238	Bodleian Library, MS. Cromwell 17	Oxford	United Kingdom	INTF
2108	12th-13th	Gospels †	1	University of Birmingham Cadbury Research Library, Braithwaite 5	Birmingham	United Kingdom	INTF
2108	12th-13th	Gospels †	226	Lincoln College, Gr. 38	Oxford	United Kingdom	INTF
2109	14th	Zigabenus Commentary on the Gospels	361	St. John's College, MS 44	Oxford	United Kingdom	INTF
2110	10th	Pauline Epistles	183	National Library, Grec 702, fol. 252-434	Paris	France	BnF, INTF
2111	13th	Gospel of Luke^{P}	12	National Library, Supplement Grec 1248, fol. 12-23	Paris	France	BnF
2111	13th	Gospel of Luke^{P}	12	National Library, Supplement Grec 1248, fol. 12-23	Paris	France	INTF
2112	13th	Gospels	266	National Library, Supplement Grec 1282	Paris	France	BnF, INTF
2113	12th	Gospels^{P}†	>1	Zoodochos Pigi Monastery (Hagias), 30, fol. 17.22	Andros	Greece	INTF
2114	17th	Maximus Peloponnesius Commentary on Revelation	115	National Library, 141	Athens	Greece	CSNTM
2114	17th	Maximus Peloponnesius Commentary on Revelation	115	National Library, 141	Athens	Greece	INTF
2115	12th	Acts of the Apostles & Pauline Epistles	232	(Lost, formerly Athens, G. Burnias)			
2116	1687	Revelation	?	(Lost, formerly Athens, G. Burnias)			
2117	12th	Gospels	259	Byzantine and Christian Museum, 2	Athens	Greece	INTF
2118	13th	Gospels	360	Byzantine and Christian Museum, 1	Athens	Greece	INTF
2119	13th	Matthew† 12:10-26:43; Mark† 1:1-5:21, 14:43-16:20	92	National Historical Museum, 212	Athens	Greece	CSNTM, INTF
2120	12th	Gospels	263	Athens University History Museum, 18	Athens	Greece	MOTB
2120	12th	Gospels	263	Athens University History Museum, 18	Athens	Greece	INTF
2121+[2443]	11th	Matthew†, Mark†, Luke, John†	179	Athens University History Museum, AK 23	Athens	Greece	CSNTM
2121+[2443]	11th	Matthew†, Mark†, Luke, John†	179	Athens University History Museum, AK 23	Athens	Greece	AU
2122	12th	Gospels	281	Athens University History Museum, 2	Athens	Greece	AU
2122	12th	Gospels	281	Athens University History Museum, 2	Athens	Greece	INTF
2123	13th	Matthew, Mark, Luke†	163	Athens University History Museum, AK 24	Athens	Greece	CSNTM, INTF
2124	14th	Gospels^{P}	2	Athens University History Museum, 36	Athens	Greece	AU
2125	10th	General Epistles† and Pauline Epistles†	270	Estense Library, G. 196, a.V.6.3 (II G 3), fol. 52-321	Modena	Italy	INTF
2126	12th	Gospels	203	Victor Emmanuel III National Library, Ms. II. A. 38	Naples	Italy	INTF
2127	12th	Gospels†, Acts, General Epistles, Pauline Epistles	1	Free Library, Lewis E M 044: 27-28	Philadelphia, PA	USA	FL
2127	12th	Gospels†, Acts, General Epistles, Pauline Epistles	229	Central Library, Dep. Mus. 4	Palermo	Italy	INTF
2128	14th-16th	Homilies on 2 Corinthians, Galatians† (No continuous text)	480	Marciana National Library, Gr. I,35 (1071)	Venice	Italy	INTF
2129	15th	Cyril Commentary on Gospel of John†	382	Marciana National Library, Gr. Z. 121 (324)	Venice	Italy	INTF
2130	16th	James - 3 John	79	Marciana National Library, Gr. I,63 (968)	Venice	Italy	INTF
2131	15th	Gospels, Acts, Pauline Epistles, General Epistles	322	The Vernadsky National Library of Ukraine, F. 301 (KDA), 10p	Kyiv	Ukraine	INTF
2132	11th	Gospels†	20	Russian State Library, F.181.12 (Gr. 12)	Moscow	Russia	INTF
2132	11th	Gospels†	259	National Library of Russia, Gr. 801	Saint Petersburg	Russia	INTF
2133	11th	Gospels	463	Russian State Library, F.201.19 (Gr. 8)	Moscow	Russia	INTF
2134	11th	Gospels	340	State Historical Museum, V. 13, S. 518	Moscow	Russia	
2135	12th	Gospels	317	State Historical Museum, V. 14, S. 519	Moscow	Russia	INTF
2136	17th	New Testament	479	State Historical Museum, V. 26, S. 472	Moscow	Russia	INTF
2137	17th	Gospels†, Acts†, General Epistles†	190	State Historical Museum, V. 27, S. 473	Moscow	Russia	INTF
2138	1072	Acts, General Epistles†, Pauline Epistles†, Revelation	398	Scientific Library of the State Gorky University, 2 (Gorkij-Bibl. 2280)	Moscow	Russia	INTF
2139	13th	Gospels †	257	National Library of Russia, Gr. 184	Saint Petersburg	Russia	INTF
2140	12th	Gospels †	180	National Library of Russia, Gr. 204	Saint Petersburg	Russia	INTF
2141	12th-13th	Gospels	286	National Library of Russia, Gr. 206	Saint Petersburg	Russia	INTF
2142	10th-11th	Gospels	285	National Library of Russia, Gr. 210	Saint Petersburg	Russia	INTF
2143	12th	Acts, Pauline Epistles, General Epistles	241	National Library of Russia, Gr. 211	Saint Petersburg	Russia	INTF
2144	11th	Matthew†, Mark†, Luke†	139	National Library of Russia, Gr. 221	Saint Petersburg	Russia	INTF
2145	12th	Gospels †	331	National Library of Russia, Gr. 222	Saint Petersburg	Russia	INTF
2146	12th	Gospels	359	National Library of Russia, Gr. 223	Saint Petersburg	Russia	INTF
2147	11th-12th	Gospels†, Acts†, Pauline Epistles†, General Epistles†	291	National Library of Russia, Gr. 224	Saint Petersburg	Russia	INTF
2148	14th	Theophylact Commentary on the Gospels	284	National Library of Russia, Gr. 235	Saint Petersburg	Russia	INTF
[2149]=566							
[2150]=1346							
[2151] = ℓ 1019							
[2152]=609							
[2153] = 1209							
[2154]=1338							
[2155] = 1334							
[2156]=925							
[2157] = 1329							
[2158] = 1206							
2159	1281	Gospels	108	The Russian National Library Academy of Science, K'pel 76	Saint Petersburg	Russia	INTF
2159	1281	Gospels	1	National Library of Russia, Gr. 311	Saint Petersburg	Russia	INTF
2160	1303	Gospels †	2	National Library of Russia, Gr. 314	Saint Petersburg	Russia	
[2161]=938							
[2162] = 1891							
[2163] = 1352							
[2164]=712							
[2165]=928							
[2166] = 951							
[2167] = 1238							
[2168]=903							
[2169]=1348							
[2170]=1336							
[2171]							
2172	10th-11th	Gospels †	195	National Library of Russia, Gr. 509	Saint Petersburg	Russia	INTF
2173	12th	Gospels	234	National Library of Russia, Gr. 511	Saint Petersburg	Russia	INTF
2174	13th	Gospels	250	National Library of Russia, Gr. 513	Saint Petersburg	Russia	INTF
2175	14th	Gospels, Acts, 1 Corinthians-Hebrews †	216	National Library of Russia, Gr. 517	Saint Petersburg	Russia	INTF
2176	11th	Gospels	239	National Library of Russia, Gr. 538	Saint Petersburg	Russia	INTF
2177	12th	Gospels †	153	National Library of Russia, Gr. 539	Saint Petersburg	Russia	INTF
2178	14th-15th	Gospels	279	National Library of Russia, Gr. 540	Saint Petersburg	Russia	INTF
2179	12th-13th	John †	8	National Library of Russia, Gr. 541	Saint Petersburg	Russia	INTF
2180	13th-14th	Acts, General Epistles, Pauline Epistles †	153	National Library of Russia, Gr. 543	Saint Petersburg	Russia	INTF
2181	1054	Gospels	252	National Library of Russia, Gr. 643	Saint Petersburg	Russia	INTF
2182	12th-13th	Gospels †	319	National Library of Russia, Gr. 644	Saint Petersburg	Russia	INTF
2183	11th	Pauline Epistles	474	Vatopedi Monastery, 239	Mount Athos	Greece	INTF
2184	13th	Theophylact Commentary on Luke, John†	102	Vatopedi Monastery, 251	Mount Athos	Greece	INTF
2185	15th	Theophylact Commentary on Luke, John†	191	Vatopedi Monastery, 252	Mount Athos	Greece	INTF
2186	12th	Chrysostom Commentary on General Epistles† Revelation	94	Vatopedi Monastery, 333, fol. 83-176	Mount Athos	Greece	INTF
2187	13th	Luke† (Nicetas Catena)	585	Vatopedi Monastery, 530	Mount Athos	Greece	INTF
2188	14th	Theophylact Commentary on the Gospels†	264	Vatopedi Monastery, 529	Mount Athos	Greece	INTF
2189	12th	Pauline Epistles	258	Vatopedi Monastery, 593	Mount Athos	Greece	INTF
2190	12th	Matthew†	362	Vatopedi Monastery, 2443	Mount Athos	Greece	INTF
2191	11th	Gospels, Acts, Pauline Epistles, General Epistles	241	Vatopedi Monastery, Ms. W. 530c	Mount Athos	Greece	INTF
2191	11th	Gospels, Acts, Pauline Epistles, General Epistles	1	Walters Art Museum, Ms. W. 530c	Baltimore, MD	USA	WAM
2192	15th	Theophylact Commentary on John†	180	Philotheou Monastery, 85	Mount Athos	Greece	INTF
2193	10th	Gospels	259	Iviron Monastery, 247	Mount Athos	Greece	INTF
2194	1118	Acts, Pauline Epistles, General Epistles	142	Great Lavra Monastery, A' 58	Mount Athos	Greece	INTF
2195	11th	Gospels	352	Vatican Library, Ross.135-138	Vatican City	Vatican City	DVL,
2195	11th	Gospels	352	Vatican Library, Ross.135-138	Vatican City	Vatican City	INTF
2196	16th	Revelation	25	Great Lavra Monastery, I'48, fol. 395-419	Mount Athos	Greece	INTF
2197	14th	Theophylact Commentary on Pauline Epistles†, General Epistles†	411	Vatopedi Monastery, 245	Mount Athos	Greece	INTF
2198	11th	Gospels	217	Owner unknown			
2199	11th	Matthew†, Mark†	49	Monastery of Olympiotissa, 225	Elassona	Greece	INTF
2199	11th	Matthew†, Mark†	42	The Russian National Library Academy of Science, Hist. Inst. 38/669	Saint Petersburg	Russia	INTF
2200	14th	New Testament†	286	Monastery of Olympiotissa, 79	Elassona	Greece	INTF

[top]

== Minuscules 2201–2300 ==
#	Date	Contents	Pages	Institution and refs.	City, State	Country	Images
2201	15th	New Testament†	205	Monastery of Olympiotissa, 6	Elassona	Greece	INTF
2202	13th	Theophylact Commentary on Matthew†, Luke†, John†	88	Monastery of Olympiotissa, 27	Elassona	Greece	INTF
2203	13th	Theophylact Commentary on the Gospels†	232	Monastery of Olympiotissa, 53	Elassona	Greece	INTF
2204	15th	Gospels†	219	Monastery of Olympiotissa, 51	Elassona	Greece	INTF
[2205] = 2659							
2206	15th	Theophylact Commentary on the Gospels	416	Greek Orthodox Patriarchate, 2457	Alexandria	Egypt	INTF
2207	16th	Theophylact Commentary on Matthew†, Mark†	170	Greek Orthodox Patriarchate, 100	Alexandria	Egypt	INTF
2208	14th	Pauline Epistles †	1?	Greek Orthodox Patriarchate, 372	Alexandria	Egypt	INTF
[2209]=2592							
[2210]= ℓ1908							
2211	13th	Gospels	365	Kipoureon Monastery	Lixouri, Cephalonia	Greece	INTF
[2212]= ℓ2049							
2213	15th	Gospels	332	Jakovatos	Lixouri, Cephalonia	Greece	INTF
2214	14th	Theophylact Commentary on the Gospels	419	Center for Slavic and Byzantine Studies, 233 (Kosinitza, 79)	Sofia	Bulgaria	INTF
2215	12th	Gospels	223	Metropolis Library	Larnaca	Cyprus	INTF
2216	12th	Gospels †	195	Owner unknown			
2217	12th	Gospels	240	Leimonos Monastery, Ms. Lesbiacus Leimonos 294	Kalloni, Lesbos	Greece	LM
2217	12th	Gospels	240	Leimonos Monastery, Ms. Lesbiacus Leimonos 294	Kalloni, Lesbos	Greece	INTF
2218	16th	Acts, Pauline Epistles, General Epistles	200	Leimonos Monastery, Ms. Lesbiacus Leimonos 297	Kalloni, Lesbos	Greece	INTF
[2219] = 1715							
2220	12th	Gospels†	201	Leimonos Monastery, Ms. Lesbiacus Leimonos 507	Kalloni, Lesbos	Greece	LM
2221	1432	Gospels, Acts, Pauline Epistles, General Epistles	376	Museum of Ecclesiastical Art, 5	Sparta	Greece	INTF
2222	14th	Gospels	2	Walters Art Museum, Ms. W. 523	Baltimore, MD	USA	WAM
2222	14th	Gospels	2	Owner Unknown			
2222	14th	Gospels	125	The University of Chicago Library, Ms. 138 (Goodspeed)	Chicago, IL	USA	TUOCL
2223	1282	Gospels †	183	Agios Lavrentios Church, 15	Pelion	Greece	INTF
2224	9th	Gospels	453	Mega Spileo Monastery, 1	Kalavryta	Greece	INTF
[2225]	1292	Acts, Pauline Epistles, General Epistles	154	Destroyed, formerly Mega Spileo Monastery, 4	Kalavryta	Greece	
[2226]	12th	Gospels	228	Destroyed, formerly Mega Spileo Monastery, 5	Kalavryta	Greece	
[2227]	14th	Gospels	229	Destroyed, formerly Mega Spileo Monastery, 6	Kalavryta	Greece	
[2228]	11th	Gospels	221	Destroyed, formerly Mega Spileo Monastery, 7	Kalavryta	Greece	
2229	11th	Gospels	301	Mega Spileo Monastery, 8	Kalavryta	Greece	INTF
[2230]	13th	Gospels †	121	Destroyed, formerly Mega Spileo Monastery, 9	Kalavryta	Greece	
[2231]	12th	Mark, Luke, John	156	Destroyed, formerly Mega Spileo Monastery, 10	Kalavryta	Greece	
[2232]	12th	Gospels	159	Destroyed, formerly Mega Spileo Monastery, 15	Kalavryta	Greece	
[2233]	12th	Acts, Pauline Epistles, General Epistles †	219	Destroyed, formerly Mega Spileo Monastery, 27	Kalavryta	Greece	
[2234]	13th	Gospels	226	Destroyed, formerly Mega Spileo Monastery, 41	Kalavryta	Greece	
[2235]	15th	Gospels †	298	Destroyed, formerly Mega Spileo Monastery, 42	Kalavryta	Greece	
2236	13th	Gospels	153	Zoodochu Pigis	Lesbos	Greece	INTF
2237	16th	Matthew †	23	Ipsilou Monastery (St. John the Theologian), 13, fol. 129-151	Antissa, Lesbos	Greece	INTF
2238	13th	Gospels	255	Ipsilou Monastery (St. John the Theologian), 54. 55, 42, 113 fol.	Antissa, Lesbos	Greece	INTF
[2239]	18th	Commentary on Acts, Pauline Epistles, General Epistles†	403	National Library, Taphu 289	Athens	Greece	INTF
2240	1661	Romans†	559	National Library, Taphu 755	Athens	Greece	
[2241]= ℓ1390							
2242	12th	Theodoret Commentary on Acts†, Romans†, 1 Corinthians†	394	National Library, Supplement Grec 1299	Paris	France	BnF, INTF
2243	17th	Acts, Pauline Epistles, General Epistles	103	National Library, 222, fol. 144-246	Athens	Greece	CSNTM
2243	17th	Acts, Pauline Epistles, General Epistles	103	National Library, 222, fol. 144-246	Athens	Greece	INTF
2244	11th-12th	Gospels	356	Albania National Archives, Kod. Br. 15	Tirana	Albania	CSNTM
2245	13th	Gospels	286	Albania National Archives, Kod. Br. 29	Tirana	Albania	CSNTM
2245	13th	Gospels	286	Albania National Archives, Kod. Br. 29	Tirana	Albania	INTF
2246	14th	Gospels†	186	Albania National Archives, Kod. Br. 26	Tirana	Albania	CSNTM
2247	1312	Gospels†	228	Albania National Archives, Kod. Br. 21/35	Tirana	Albania	CSNTM
2247	1312	Gospels†	228	Albania National Archives, Kod. Br. 21/35	Tirana	Albania	INTF
2248	14th	Theophylact Commentary on the Pauline Epistles†	300	Library of the Greek Orthodox Patriarchate, Saba 149	Jerusalem		LOC, INTF, CSNTM
2249	1330	Gospels†, Acts†, General Epistles†	372	Center for Slavic and Byzantine Studies, 193 (Kosinitza, 221)	Sofia	Bulgaria	INTF
2250	13th-14th	Gospels †	102	Center for Slavic and Byzantine Studies, 56 (Kosinitza, 239)	Sofia	Bulgaria	INTF
[2251]							
2252	11th	Gospels	308	Albanian National Archives, Kod. Vl. 5	Tirana	Albania	CSNTM, INTF
2253	12th-13th	Gospels	304	Albanian National Archives, Kod. Vl. 10	Tirana	Albania	CSNTM, INTF
2254	16th	Revelation	59	Iviron Monastery, 382, fol. 468-526	Mount Athos	Greece	INTF
2255	16th	Gospels, Acts, Pauline Epistles, General Epistles	364	Iviron Monastery, 503	Mount Athos	Greece	INTF
2256	15th	Revelation 1:1-20:11 †	26	Iviron Monastery, 698	Mount Athos	Greece	INTF
2257	14th	Theophylact Commentary on Romans-2 Timothy†	350	Center for Slavic and Byzantine Studies, 218 (Kosinitza, 132)	Sofia	Bulgaria	INTF
2258	17th	Revelation	21	Iviron Monastery, 589, fol. a'- ka'	Mount Athos	Greece	INTF
2259	11th	Andreas of Caesarea Commentary on Revelation 13:14-14:16†	5	Stavronikita Monastery, 25, fol. 325-329	Mount Athos	Greece	INTF; LOC
2260	12th	Gospels†	280	Monastery of Agia Lavra, 30	Kalavryta	Greece	INTF
2261	14th	Gospels, Acts, Pauline Epistles, General Epistles	357	Monastery of Agia Lavra, 31	Kalavryta	Greece	INTF
[2262]	12th	Gospels	190	Manuscript destroyed, formerly Mega Spileo Monastery, 2	Kalavryta	Greece	
2263	12th	Gospels	278	Mega Spileo Monastery, 3, fol. 20-297	Kalavryta	Greece	INTF
2264	13th	Gospels †		Owner unknown			
2265	14th	Gospels	189	Museum of Ecclesiastical Art, 44	Sparta	Greece	INTF
2266	14th	Gospels	253	The University of Chicago Library, Ms. 727 (Goodspeed)	Chicago, IL	USA	TUOCL
2266	14th	Gospels	253	The University of Chicago Library, Ms. 727 (Goodspeed)	Chicago, IL	USA	INTF
2267	1830	Matthew †	74	The Russian National Library Academy of Science, K'pel 165	Saint Petersburg	Russia	INTF
2268	ca. 1300	Mark 1:1-14 †	1	Duke University, Gk MS 4	Durham	USA	DU
2269	12th	Matthew †	1	The Russian National Library Academy of Science, K'pel 70	Saint Petersburg	Russia	INTF
[2270] = 2311							
2271	12th	Gospels †	1?	Owner unknown (Formerly Istanbul, Russ. Arch. Inst., A 16)			
[2272] = 1826							
2273	14th	Gospels	323	The Russian National Library Academy of Science, K'pel 86	Saint Petersburg	Russia	INTF
2274	14th	Matthew †	4	The Russian National Library Academy of Science, K'pel 84	Saint Petersburg	Russia	INTF
2275	11th	Mark †	6	The Russian National Library Academy of Science, K'pel 72	Saint Petersburg	Russia	INTF
2276+[815]	14th	Matthew†	1	British Library, Add MS 35123, fol. 469	London	United Kingdom	INTF
2277+[816]	11th	Gospels	259	British Library, Add MS 37001	London	United Kingdom	BL
2277+[816]	11th	Gospels	259	British Library, Add MS 37001	London	United Kingdom	INTF
2278+[812]	14th	Gospels	254	British Library, Add MS 37002	London	United Kingdom	BL
2279	14th	Acts†, Pauline Epistles (Romans†), General Epistles	235	British Library, Add MS 37003	London	United Kingdom	BL
2280	12th	Gospels†	276	British Library, Add MS 36752	London	United Kingdom	BL
2280	12th	Gospels†	276	British Library, Add MS 36752	London	United Kingdom	INTF
2281	11th	Gospels	239	John Rylands University Library, Gr. Ms. 1	Manchester	United Kingdom	INTF
2282	11th	Gospels†	204	John Rylands University Library, Gr. Ms. 7	Manchester	United Kingdom	INTF
2283	13th	Gospels	180	John Rylands University Library, Gr. Ms. 13	Manchester	United Kingdom	INTF
2284	13th	Gospels	324	John Rylands University Library, Gr. Ms. 18	Manchester	United Kingdom	INTF
2285	12th	Zigabenus Commentary on Matthew†, Mark†, Luke†	120	Esphigmenou Monastery, 38	Mount Athos	Greece	
2286	12th	Revelation^{K}	44	Stavronikita Monastery, 48, fol. 63-106	Mount Athos	Greece	MAR
2287	11th	Gospels	278	Agion Theodoron Monastery, 1	Kalavryta	Greece	INTF
2288	15th	Acts, General Epistles	104	Estense Library, G. 13, a.U.2.14 (II A 13)	Modena	Italy	INTF
2288	15th	Pauline Epistles	122	Gothenburg University Library, Cod. Gr. 2	Gothenburg	Sweden	GUL
2288	15th	Pauline Epistles	122	Gothenburg University Library, Cod. Gr. 2	Gothenburg	Sweden	INTF
2289	12th	Acts†, Pauline Epistles†, General Epistles†	185	Vatopedi Monastery, 857	Mount Athos	Greece	INTF
2290	10th	Matthew†^{S}, Mark, Luke, John†^{S}	203	British Library, Add MS 37320	London	United Kingdom	BL
2291	13th	Gospels	227	British Library, Add MS 37485, Add MS 37486	London	United Kingdom	BL, BL
2291	13th	Gospels	227	British Library, Add MS 37485, Add MS 37486	London	United Kingdom	INTF
2292	1283	Gospels	221	Austrian National Library, Suppl. gr. 107	Vienna	Austria	ANL
[2293]=1282							
[2294]=2466							
2295	11th	Gospels	241	John Rylands University Library, Gr. Ms. 2	Manchester	United Kingdom	INTF
2296	12th	Gospels	253	John Rylands University Library, Gr. Ms. 10	Manchester	United Kingdom	INTF
2297	11th	Gospels	253	Monastery of Saint John the Theologian, 72	Patmos	Greece	CSNTM
2297	11th	Gospels	253	Monastery of Saint John the Theologian, 72	Patmos	Greece	INTF
2298	12th	Book of Acts, Pauline Epistles	390	National Library, Grec 102	Paris	France	BnF
2298	12th	Book of Acts, Pauline Epistles	390	National Library, Grec 102	Paris	France	INTF
2299	11th	Matthew† 13:33–17:25; 18:24–24.20; 25:1–31; 26:64–27.14; 27:35–28.20; Mark† 1:20–6:12.	27	Byzantine and Christian Museum, BXM 52	Athens	Greece	CSNTM
2299	11th	Matthew† 13:33–17:25; 18:24–24.20; 25:1–31; 26:64–27.14; 27:35–28.20; Mark† 1:20–6:12.	27	Byzantine and Christian Museum, BXM 52	Athens	Greece	INTF
2300	13th	Luke† 9:32-11:31	8	Byzantine and Christian Museum, BXM 8	Athens	Greece	CSNTM
2300	13th	Luke† 9:32-11:31	8	Byzantine and Christian Museum, BXM 8	Athens	Greece	INTF

[top]

== Minuscules 2301-2400 ==
#	Date	Contents	Pages	Institution and refs.	City, State	Country	Images
2301	1573	Gospels	354	Byzantine and Christian Museum, BXM 10	Athens	Greece	CSNTM
2301	1573	Gospels	354	Byzantine and Christian Museum, BXM 10	Athens	Greece	INTF
2302	15th	Andreas of Caesarea Commentary on Revelation†	71	Library of the Greek Orthodox Patriarchate, Saba 537	Jerusalem		LOC, INTF, CSNTM
2303	14th	Acts†, James†, 1 Peter†	23	Library of the Greek Orthodox Patriarchate, Saba 605, fol. 1-15; Saba 617, fol. 1-8	Jerusalem		LOC, LOC, CSNTM
2304	13th	Gospels†	234	Lutheran School of Theology at Chicago, Gruber Ms. 50	Maywood, IL	United States	CSNTM, INTF
2305	14th	Andreas of Caesarea Commentary on Revelation	28	Vatopedi Monastery, 659, fol. 146-173	Mount Athos	Greece	INTF
2306	12th	Matthew†	8	Vatopedi Monastery, 889, p. 1-16	Mount Athos	Greece	INTF
2307	11th	Matthew†, John†	116	Vatopedi Monastery, 2547	Mount Athos	Greece	INTF
2308	11th	Gospels†	252	Humboldt University of Berlin, Kriegsverlust	Berlin	Germany	
2309	14th	Mark†, Luke†, John†	120	Vatopedi Monastery, 893	Mount Athos	Greece	INTF
2310	14th	Gospels, Acts†, Pauline Epistles†, General Epistles†	158	Vatopedi Monastery, 867	Mount Athos	Greece	INTF
2311	12th	Luke†, John†	2	The Russian National Library Academy of Science, K'pel 85	Saint Petersburg	Russia	INTF
2311	12th	Luke†, John†	95	University of Notre Dame, Hesburgh Library, MS Graec. a.2	South Bend, IN	United States	INTF
[2312]=1435							
2313	11th	John† 6:44-8:35	4	Hellenic Parliament Library, HPL 2551	Athens	Greece	CSNTM
2313	11th	John† 6:44-8:35	4	Hellenic Parliament Library, HPL 2551	Athens	Greece	INTF
2314	12th	Gospels	328	Romanian Academy, Ms. Gr. 94 (Litzica 311)	Bucharest	Romania	INTF
2315	12th	Gospels	207	Romanian Academy, Ms. Gr. 665 (Litzica 312)	Bucharest	Romania	INTF
2316	14th	Gospels	120	Romanian Academy, Ms. Gr. 360 (Litz 313)	Bucharest	Romania	INTF
2317	1742	Gospels	195	Romanian Academy, 317 (695)	Bucharest	Romania	INTF
2318	18th	Pauline Epistles†, General Epistles†	409	Romanian Academy, 318 (234)	Bucharest	Romania	INTF
[2319]							
[2320]							
2321	11th	Gospels	263	University of Toronto Libraries: Thomas Fisher Rare Book Library, fisher2:131	Toronto	Canada	TFRBL
2321	11th	Gospels	263	University of Toronto Libraries: Thomas Fisher Rare Book Library, fisher2:131	Toronto	Canada	INTF
2322	12th-13th	Gospels †	263	University of Texas Harry Ransom Humanities Research Center, Ms. Gr. 1	Austin, TX	United States	HRHRC
2322	12th-13th	Gospels †	263	University of Texas Harry Ransom Humanities Research Center, Ms. Gr. 1	Austin, TX	United States	INTF
2323	13th	Gospels†, Revelation†	311	Benaki Museum, MS 46	Athens	Greece	CSNTM, INTF
2324	10th	Gospels†	346	Yale University Library, Beinecke MS 1145	New Haven, CT	United States	YUL
2324	10th	Gospels†	346	Yale University Library, Beinecke MS 1145	New Haven, CT	United States	INTF
[2325]							
2326	16th	Gospels†	194	Drew University, Ms. 10	Madison, NJ	United States	CSNTM
[2327]=1359							
2328	12th	Gospels	287	National Library, Supplement Grec 1316	Paris	France	BnF, INTF
2329	10th	Revelation	36	Great Meteoron Monastery, 573, fol. 210-245r	Meteora	Greece	INTF
[2330]							
[2331]							
[2332]							
[2333]=1810							
[2334]=1811							
[2335]=1802							
[2336]=1803							
[2337]							
[2338]							
[2339]							
[2340]							
[2341]							
[2342]							
[2343]=2375							
2344	11th	Acts, General Epistles, Pauline epistles, Revelation	61	National Library, Coislin 18, fol. 170-230	Paris	France	BnF, INTF
2345	14th	Matthew†	2	Library of the Greek Orthodox Patriarchate, Nea Syllogi (Photiu), 59d	Jerusalem		INTF
2346	12th	Gospels†	273	Owner Unknown, Formerly Charles Ryrie			CSNTM
2346	12th	Gospels†	273	Owner Unknown, Formerly Charles Ryrie			INTF
[2347]=1701							
[2348]=2098							
[2349]=905							
2350	17th	Oecumenius Commentary on Revelation	27	Turin National University Library, B.I.15	Turin	Italy	INTF
2351	10th	Revelation 1:1-14:5†	45	Great Meteoron Monastery, 573, fol. 245v-290	Meteora	Greece	INTF
2352	15th	New Testament	389	Great Meteoron Monastery, 237	Meteora	Greece	INTF
2353	13th	Matthew†, Mark†	20	University of Michigan, MS 4	Ann Arbor, MI	United States	CSNTM
2353	13th	Matthew†, Mark†	20	University of Michigan, MS 4	Ann Arbor, MI	United States	INTF
2354	1287	Gospels	133	University of Michigan, MS 80	Ann Arbor, MI	United States	CSNTM
2354	1287	Gospels	133	University of Michigan, MS 80	Ann Arbor, MI	United States	INTF
2355	14th	Gospels	296	Saint Catherine's Monastery, Gr. 1591	Sinai	Egypt	LOC, INTF, CSNTM
2356	14th	Gospels, Acts, Pauline Epistles, General Epistles	415	Saint Catherine's Monastery, Gr. 1594	Sinai	Egypt	LOC, INTF, CSNTM
2357	14th	General Epistles†, Pauline Epistles†	16	Library of the Greek Orthodox Patriarchate, Photiu 48	Jerusalem		INTF
2358	12th	Gospels†	175	Southern Baptist Theological Seminary	Louisville, KY	United States	CSNTM
2358	12th	Gospels†	175	Southern Baptist Theological Seminary	Louisville, KY	United States	INTF
2359	15th-16th	John^{P} 1:1-17	2	Vatican Library, Barb.gr.372, fol. 3v. 4r	Vatican City	Vatican City	DVL
2359	15th-16th	John^{P} 1:1-17	2	Vatican Library, Barb.gr.372, fol. 3v. 4r	Vatican City	Vatican City	INTF
2360	11th	Matthew†	4	Herzog August Library, Codd. Gud. Graec. 112, fol. 138/141. 144/149	Wolfenbüttel	Germany	
2361	16th	Andreas of Caesarea Commentary on Revelation 4:10-5:6; 6:17-7:2†	2	Vatican Library, Vat.gr.1205, fol. 144.145	Vatican City	Vatican City	DVL, INTF
2362	14th	Gospels	376	Library of the Serail, 125	Istanbul	Turkey	INTF
2363	11th	Luke†	1	University of Michigan, Ms. 12	Ann Arbor, MI	United States	INTF
2364	12th-13th	Gospels	492	University of Michigan, MS 182	Ann Arbor, MI	United States	CSNTM, INTF
2365	12th	Matthew†	2	University of Michigan, MS 173e	Ann Arbor, MI	United States	CSNTM
2365	12th	Matthew†	2	University of Michigan, MS 173e	Ann Arbor, MI	United States	INTF
[2366]=895							
2367	12th	Gospels	181	Princeton University Library, Garrett MS. 4	Princeton, NJ	United States	INTF
2368	10th-11th	Gospels†	1	Docheiariou Monastery, 56	Mount Athos	Greece	INTF
2368	10th-11th	Gospels†	135	Walters Art Museum, Ms. W. 527	Baltimore, MD	United States	WAM, INTF
2369	10th	Gospels	335	Walters Art Museum, Ms. W. 523	Baltimore, MD	United States	WAM, INTF
2370	11th	Gospels	291	Walters Art Museum, Ms. W. 522	Baltimore, MD	United States	WAM, INTF
[2371]=647							
2372	13th	Gospels†	234	Walters Art Museum, Ms. W. 528	Baltimore, MD	United States	WAM, INTF
2373	10th	Gospels through John 6:8†	254	Walters Art Museum, Ms. W. 524	Baltimore, MD	United States	WAM, INTF
2374	13th-14th	Gospels, Acts, Pauline Epistles, General Epistles	252	Walters Art Museum, Ms. W. 525	Baltimore, MD	United States	WAM, INTF
2375	12th	Gospels	233	Walters Art Museum, Ms. W. 531	Baltimore, MD	United States	WAM, INTF
2376	13th	Matthew†, Mark†, Luke†	171	Byzantine and Christian Museum, 83	Athens	Greece	INTF
2377	14th	Revelation 13:10-14:4; 19:21-22:20†	10	Byzantine and Christian Museum, MS 117 (fol. 1–10)	Athens	Greece	CSNTM
2378	16th	Acts †, General Epistles †, Pauline Epistles †	234	Byzantine and Christian Museum, BXM 19705	Athens	Greece	CSNTM
[2379] = ℓ 2004							
2380	13th	Mark†	8	General Theological Seminary, Ms. 4, in G. W. Case	New York, NY	United States	INTF
2381	11th	Gospels	428	Museum of Art, Acc. 42. 152	Cleveland, OH	United States	CMA
2382	12th	Gospels	309	The Morgan Library & Museum, MS M.340	New York, NY	United States	MLAM
2382	12th	Gospels	ca. 360	Dousikou Monastery, 4	Trikala	Greece	INTF
2383	13th-14th	Gospels†	220	The Morgan Library & Museum, MS M.378	New York, NY	United States	MLAM
[2384]= ℓ 1030							
[2385]	11th	Palimpsest Septuagint fragments	96	The Morgan Library & Museum, MS M.745	New York, NY	United States	INTF
2386	11th	Gospels	195	The Morgan Library & Museum, MS M.748	New York, NY	United States	MLAM
2386	11th	Gospels	1	Princeton University The Art Museum, 32-14	Princeton, NJ	United States	INTF
2387	14th	Gospels	252	National Library, Supplement Grec 1356	Paris	France	BnF
2388	12th	Gospels	230	Lutheran School of Theology at Chicago, Gruber 121	Maywood, IL	United States	CSNTM, INTF
2389	11th-12th	Mark, Luke, John	201	Lutheran School of Theology at Chicago, Gruber 119, 120, 54	Maywood, IL	United States	CSNTM, INTF
2390	13th	Matthew, Mark, Luke	161	National Library, Supplement Grec 1341	Paris	France	BnF
2391	12th	Luke†	6	National Library, Supplement Grec 1355 I, fol. 1-6	Paris	France	BnF
2392	12th	Matthew†, Luke†, John†	13	National Library, Supplement Grec 1355 II, fol. 7-19	Paris	France	BnF
[2393]=1826							
2394	13th	Gospels	400	The University of Chicago Library, Ms. 131 (Goodspeed)	Chicago, IL	United States	TUOCL
2395	13th	Theophylact Commentary on the Gospels†	332	Panagia Zourva Monastery	Hydra	Greece	
2396	12th	Gospels	165	The University of Chicago Library, Ms. 133 (Goodspeed)	Chicago, IL	United States	TUOCL
2396	12th	Gospels	165	The University of Chicago Library, Ms. 133 (Goodspeed)	Chicago, IL	United States	INTF
2397	14th	Gospels	341	The University of Chicago Library, Ms. 135 (Goodspeed)	Chicago, IL	United States	TUOCL
2398	14th	Gospels†	1	Diocesan Theological College, Ms. B	Montreal	Canada	INTF
2398	14th	Gospels†	206	The University of Chicago Library, Ms. 132 (Goodspeed)	Chicago, IL	United States	TUOCL
2398	14th	Gospels†	206	The University of Chicago Library, Ms. 132 (Goodspeed)	Chicago, IL	United States	INTF
2399	14th	Gospels†	203	The University of Chicago Library, Ms. 137 (Goodspeed)	Chicago, IL	United States	TUOCL, INTF
2400	13th	Gospels†, Acts†, Pauline Epistles†, General Epistles†	207	The University of Chicago Library, Ms. 965 (Goodspeed)	Chicago, IL	United States	TUOCL
2400	13th	Gospels†, Acts†, Pauline Epistles†, General Epistles†	207	The University of Chicago Library, Ms. 965 (Goodspeed)	Chicago, IL	United States	INTF

[top]

== Minuscules 2401–2500 ==
#	Date	Contents	Pages	Institution and refs.	City, State	Country	Images
2401	12th	Acts†, Pauline Epistles†, General Epistles†	2	McGill University	Montreal	Canada	INTF
2401	12th	Acts†, Pauline Epistles†, General Epistles†	152	The University of Chicago Library, Ms. 142 (Goodspeed)	Chicago, IL	USA	TUOCL, INTF
2402	16th	Maximus Peloponnesius and Andreas of Caesarea Commentary on Revelation	194	The University of Chicago Library, Ms. 931 (Goodspeed)	Chicago, IL	USA	TUOCL
2402	16th	Maximus Peloponnesius and Andreas of Caesarea Commentary on Revelation	194	The University of Chicago Library, Ms. 931 (Goodspeed)	Chicago, IL	USA	INTF
2403	16th	Oecumenius Commentary on Revelation† 1:1-2:1; 15:1-22:21	29	National Library, 4592, fol. 111-139	Madrid	Spain	INTF
2404	13th	Gospels, Acts, Pauline Epistles, General Epistles	376	The University of Chicago Library, Ms. 126 (Goodspeed)	Chicago, IL	USA	TUOCL
2404	13th	Gospels, Acts, Pauline Epistles, General Epistles	376	The University of Chicago Library, Ms. 126 (Goodspeed)	Chicago, IL	USA	INTF
2405	13th	Gospels	209	The University of Chicago Library, Ms. 130 (Goodspeed)	Chicago, IL	USA	TUOCL
2406	14th	Gospels†	245	The University of Chicago Library, Ms. 134 (Goodspeed)	Chicago, IL	USA	TUOCL
2407	1332	Gospels†	328	The University of Chicago Library, Ms. 136 (Goodspeed)	Chicago, IL	USA	TUOCL, INTF
2408	14th	Commentary on Revelation† 5:1-5	1	Bodleian Library, MS. Barocci 48, fol. 18	Oxford	United Kingdom	DB
2408	14th	Commentary on Revelation† 5:1-5	1	Bodleian Library, MS. Barocci 48, fol. 18	Oxford	United Kingdom	INTF
2409	13th	Matthew†, Mark†	55	The University of Chicago Library, Ms. 141 (Goodspeed)	Chicago, IL	USA	TUOCL
2409	13th	Matthew†, Mark†	55	The University of Chicago Library, Ms. 141 (Goodspeed)	Chicago, IL	USA	INTF
[2410]=2266							
2411	12th	Gospels†	379	The University of Chicago Library, Ms. 828 (Goodspeed)	Chicago, IL	USA	TUOCL
2411	12th	Gospels†	379	The University of Chicago Library, Ms. 828 (Goodspeed)	Chicago, IL	USA	INTF
2412	12th	Acts†, Pauline Epistles†, General Epistles†	151	The University of Chicago Library, Ms. 922 (Goodspeed)	Chicago, IL	USA	TUOCL
2412	12th	Acts†, Pauline Epistles†, General Epistles†	151	The University of Chicago Library, Ms. 922 (Goodspeed)	Chicago, IL	USA	INTF
[2413]=2268							
2414	10th	Gospels	218	Public Historical Library of Zagora, 1	Zagora	Greece	CSNTM
2414	10th	Gospels	218	Public Historical Library of Zagora, 1	Zagora	Greece	INTF
2415	11th-12th	Gospels†	1	Diocesan Theological College, Ms. A	Montreal	Canada	INTF
2415	11th-12th	Gospels†	210	McGill University, Ms. 2	Montreal	Canada	INTF
[2416]	12th	miniatures	5	Smithsonian Institution, Freer Gallery of Art, 09. 1685-9	Washington, DC	USA	FG
[2417]=2460							
2418	15th	Gospels†	178	Public Historical Library of Zagora, 2	Zagora	Greece	CSNTM
2418	15th	Gospels†	178	Public Historical Library of Zagora, 2	Zagora	Greece	CSNTM (4)
2419	13th-14th	Revelation† 3:1-4:8	4	National Library, Supplement Grec 159, fol. 8-11	Paris	France	BnF, INTF
2420	1296	Gospels	297	Princeton University The Art Museum, 35-70	Princeton, NJ	USA	PUAM
2421	13th	John†	2	The New York Public Library, Rare Books and Manuscripts Division, Ms. 125	New York, NY	USA	CSNTM
2421	13th	John†	2	The New York Public Library, Rare Books and Manuscripts Division, Ms. 125	New York, NY	USA	INTF
2422	16th	Gospels	265	Public Historical Library of Zagora, 2	Zagora	Greece	CSNTM, INTF
2423	13th	Acts†, General Epistles†, Pauline Epistles†	227	Duke University Gk MS 3	Durham, NC	USA	INTF
2424	10th	Hebrews†	4	Skete of Kavsokalyvia, 2	Mount Athos	Greece	INTF
2425	13th	2 Timothy†, Titus†	2	The University of Chicago Library, Ms. 943 (Goodspeed)	Chicago, IL	USA	TUOCL
2425	13th	2 Timothy†, Titus†	2	The University of Chicago Library, Ms. 943 (Goodspeed)	Chicago, IL	USA	INTF
2426	12th	Gospels	326	Lutheran School of Theology at Chicago, Gruber 114	Maywood, IL	USA	CSNTM, INTF
[2427]	19th/20th	Forgery of Byzantine era Gospel of Mark	44	The University of Chicago Library, Ms. 972 (Goodspeed)	Chicago, IL	USA	TUOCL
[2427]	19th/20th	Forgery of Byzantine era Gospel of Mark	44	The University of Chicago Library, Ms. 972 (Goodspeed)	Chicago, IL	USA	INTF
2428	15th	Andreas of Caesarea Commentary on Revelation† 1:1-17:12	69	National Library, Grec 746, fol. 239-307	Paris	France	BnF, INTF
2429	14th	Andreas of Caesarea Commentary on Revelation† 1:1-21:12	49	National Library, Grec 1002, fol. 179-227	Paris	France	BnF, INTF
2430	12th	Gospels†	183	Vatican Library, PIB (Banco A. 1. 6)	Vatican City	Vatican City	INTF
2431	1332	Acts, Pauline Epistles, General Epistles, and Revelation (with marginal scholia)	239	Skete of Kavsokalyvia, 4	Mount Athos	Greece	INTF
2432	14th	Andreas of Caesarea Commentary on Revelation	124	Vatican Library, Ross.766	Vatican City	Vatican City	DVL, INTF
2433	1736	Andreas of Caesarea Commentary on Revelation	136	Public Historical Library of Zagora, 7	Zagora	Greece	CSNTM
2433	1736	Andreas of Caesarea Commentary on Revelation	136	Public Historical Library of Zagora, 7	Zagora	Greece	INTF
2434	13th	Revelation	36	Public Historical Library of Zagora, 12	Zagora	Greece	CSNTM
2434	13th	Revelation	36	Public Historical Library of Zagora, 12	Zagora	Greece	INTF
2435	16th	Andreas of Caesarea Commentary on Revelation†	52	University Library, 2. 749	Salamanca	Spain	
2436	1418	Revelation	28	Vatopedi Monastery, 637, fol. 53-80	Mount Athos	Greece	INTF
2437	11th/12th	Gospels†	220	National Library of Brazil, I. 2	Rio de Janeiro	Brazil	NLB, CSNTM
2437	11th/12th	Gospels†	220	National Library of Brazil, I. 2	Rio de Janeiro	Brazil	INTF
2438	13th	Matthew 4:25-5:22	1	Owner Unknown			
2439	14th	Gospels	286	Archäologisches Museum, 548	Ankara	Turkey	INTF
2440	10th	Luke†	2	Byzantine and Christian Museum, BXM Frag 8; BXM 19926	Athens	Greece	CSNTM
2440	10th	Luke†	2	Byzantine and Christian Museum, BXM Frag 8; BXM 19926	Athens	Greece	INTF
2441	14th	Acts†, Pauline Epistles†	58	Gothenburg University Library, Gr. 3	Gothenburg	Sweden	GUL
2441	14th	Acts†, Pauline Epistles†	58	Gothenburg University Library, Gr. 3	Gothenburg	Sweden	INTF
2442	11th	Gospels†	170	Academy of Athens, Siderides 1	Athens	Greece	INTF
[2443]=2121							
2444	13th	Gospels †	309	Bible Museum, Ms. 4	Münster	Germany	CSNTM, INTF
2445	12th	Mark†, Luke†, John†	116	Bible Museum, Ms. 5	Münster	Germany	CSNTM, INTF
2446	12th	Gospels	320	Bible Museum, Ms. 6	Münster	Germany	CSNTM, INTF
[2447]=798							
2448	12th	Acts†, Pauline Epistles†, General Epistles†	243	Owner unknown, formerly Athens, Mus. Loverdu, Nr. 125			
[2449]	17th	Revelation in modern Greek	29	National Historical Museum, Hist. Eth. Ges. 71	Athens	Greece	CSNTM, INTF
[2450]	18th	Gospels in modern Greek	47	National Historical Museum, Hist. Eth. Ges. 112	Athens	Greece	CSNTM, INTF
2451	11th	Gospels†	145	National Historical Museum, 255	Athens	Greece	CSNTM, INTF
2452	15th	Theophylact Commentary on the Gospels	383	Skete of Saint Anne, 51	Mount Athos	Greece	INTF
2453	11th	Gospels†	264	Vatopedi Monastery, 662	Mount Athos	Greece	INTF
2454	14th	Gospels	239	Vatopedi Monastery, 894	Mount Athos	Greece	INTF
2455	15th	Gospels†	182	Vatopedi Monastery, 895	Mount Athos	Greece	INTF
2456	17th	Gospels†	143	Dionysiou Monastery, 668	Mount Athos	Greece	INTF
2457	13th	Gospels†	64	Dionysiou Monastery, 590	Mount Athos	Greece	INTF
2458	11th	Gospels	285	Dionysiou Monastery, 588	Mount Athos	Greece	INTF
2459	12th	Theophylact Commentary on the Gospels†	223	Archaeological Museum of Almyros, 2	Almyros	Greece	INTF
2460=[2417]	12th	Gospels†	8	Bible Museum, Ms. 19	Münster	Germany	INTF
2460=[2417]	12th	Gospels†	8	Bible Museum, Ms. 19	Münster	Germany	CSNTM
2460=[2417]	12th	Gospels†	2	Columbia University, Rare Book and Manuscript Library, Plimpton Ms. 12	New York	USA	CSNTM
2460=[2417]	12th	Gospels†	195	Zosimaia School, 2	Ioannina	Greece	INTF
[2461]=ℓ2154							
2462	14th-15th	Mark†, Luke†, John†	123	Ecclesiastical Historical and Archival Institute of the Patriarchate of Bulgaria, 19 (475)	Sofia	Bulgaria	INTF
2463	14th	Gospels †	210	Ecclesiastical Historical and Archival Institute of the Patriarchate of Bulgaria, 20 (421)	Sofia	Bulgaria	INTF
2464	9th	Acts† 19:35-28:31; James-2 John; 3 John 1-4†; Romans 1:1-11:28, 16:11-16:27; 1 Corinthians - 2 Thessalonians, Hebrews 1:1-10:19†	212	Monastery of Saint John the Theologian, Ms. 742	Patmos	Greece	CSNTM
2464	9th	Acts† 19:35-28:31; James-2 John; 3 John 1-4†; Romans 1:1-11:28, 16:11-16:27; 1 Corinthians - 2 Thessalonians, Hebrews 1:1-10:19†	212	Monastery of Saint John the Theologian, Ms. 742	Patmos	Greece	INTF
2465	13th	Gospels	180	Monastery of Saint John the Theologian, Ms. 745	Patmos	Greece	INTF
2466	1339	Gospels, Acts, General Epistles, Pauline Epistles	293	Monastery of Saint John the Theologian, Ms. 759	Patmos	Greece	INTF
2467	1421	Gospels†	300	Monastery of Saint John the Theologian, Ms. 775	Patmos	Greece	INTF
2468	11th	Mark†, Luke†	24	Monastery of Saint John the Theologian, Ms. 777	Patmos	Greece	INTF
2469	1569	Gospels	308	Library of the Archbishop of Cyprus, 11	Nicosia	Cyprus	
2470	12th	Theophylact Commentary on the Gospels	626	Ecumenical Patriarchate, Kamariotissis 23	Istanbul	Turkey	CSNTM
2470	12th	Theophylact Commentary on the Gospels	626	Ecumenical Patriarchate, Kamariotissis 23	Istanbul	Turkey	INTF
2471	13th	Gospels	249	Library of the Serail, 119	Istanbul	Turkey	INTF
2472	12th	Gospels†	289	Museum of Religious Art, 1/12608	Bucharest	Romania	INTF
2473	1634	Acts, General Epistles	314	National Library, Taphu 545	Athens	Greece	INTF
2474	11th	Gospels†	265	The University of Chicago Library, Ms. 1054 (Goodspeed)	Chicago, IL	USA	TUOCL
2474	11th	Gospels†	265	The University of Chicago Library, Ms. 1054 (Goodspeed)	Chicago, IL	USA	INTF
2475	11th	Gospels, Acts, General Epistles, Pauline Epistles	314	Church of the Holy Sepulchre, Skevophylakion	Jerusalem		INTF
2476	14th	Gospels	257	Romanian Academy, Ms. Gr. 932	Bucharest	Romania	INTF
2477	17th	Gospels†	230	Romanian Academy, Ms. Gr. 933	Bucharest	Romania	INTF
2478	12th-13th	Gospels	224	The Princes Czartoryski Library, 1870	Kraków	Poland	Palona
2479	13th	Gospels†	198	Municipal Library, 2 Qq C 233	Palermo	Italy	INTF
2480	16th	John†	92	Vatican Library, Vat.gr.2348	Vatican City	Vatican City	INTF
2481	16th	Mark†	84	Vatican Library, Vat.gr.2350	Vatican City	Vatican City	INTF
2482	14th	Theophylact Commentary on the Gospels, Pauline Epistles	293	Municipal Library dell'Archiginnasio, A. 3	Bologna	Italy	INTF
2483=[2866]	13th	Gospels, Acts, Pauline Epistles, General Epistles	8	Owner Unknown			INTF
2483=[2866]	13th	Gospels, Acts, Pauline Epistles, General Epistles	340	The Schøyen Collection, MS 2932	Oslo	Norway	SC
2483=[2866]	13th	Gospels, Acts, Pauline Epistles, General Epistles	340	The Schøyen Collection, MS 2932	Oslo	Norway	INTF
2484	1312	Acts†, Pauline Epistles†, General Epistles†	269	British Library, Add MS 38538	London	United Kingdom	BL
2485	11th-12th	Gospel of Luke †	2	British Library, Add MS 41180, fol. 92-93	London	United Kingdom	BL
2486	15th-16th	Mark 1:1-1:45 †	2	Bodleian Library, MS. Auct. F. 6. 1, fol. 279-280	Oxford	United Kingdom	INTF
2487	11th	Gospels †	219	Bodleian Library, MS. Lyell 91	Oxford	United Kingdom	INTF
2488	16th	Matthew†, Mark†, Luke†, Acts†	181	Cambridge University Library, Add. Mss. 4173	Cambridge	United Kingdom	INTF
2489	11th	Gospels †	>1	Cambridge University Library, Add. Ms. 4541	Cambridge	United Kingdom	CSNTM
2489	11th	Gospels †	>1	Cambridge University Library, Add. Ms. 4541	Cambridge	United Kingdom	INTF
2490	12th-13th	Theophylact Commentary on Matthew†, John†,	304	Berlin State Library, Graec. qu. 77	Berlin	Germany	INTF
2491=[2850], [2617]	13th	Matthew 19-23†, Mark 1:14-5:33; 9:14-end†, Luke 1:1-11:46†	36	Berlin State Library, Graec. qu. 90	Berlin	Germany	INTF
2491=[2850], [2617]	13th	Matthew 19-23†, Mark 1:14-5:33; 9:14-end†, Luke 1:1-11:46†	24	Burgerbibliothek of Bern, Cod. 784	Bern	Switzerland	INTF
2491=[2850], [2617]	13th	Matthew 19-23†, Mark 1:14-5:33; 9:14-end†, Luke 1:1-11:46†	1	Duke University Library, Gk MS 22	Durham, NC	North Carolina	DU
2491=[2850], [2617]	13th	Matthew 19-23†, Mark 1:14-5:33; 9:14-end†, Luke 1:1-11:46†	1	Rare Book and Manuscript Library, Med/Ren Frag. 49	New York, NY	USA	CSNTM
2491=[2850], [2617]	13th	Matthew 19-23†, Mark 1:14-5:33; 9:14-end†, Luke 1:1-11:46†	1	Rick Imlay	Billings, MT	USA	INTF
2491=[2850], [2617]	13th	Matthew 19-23†, Mark 1:14-5:33; 9:14-end†, Luke 1:1-11:46†	8	Princeton University Library, Ms. 63	Princeton, NJ	USA	INTF
2492	14th	Gospels, Acts, Pauline Epistles, General Epistles	178	Saint Catherine's Monastery, Gr. 1342, fol. 1-178	Sinai	Egypt	LOC, INTF, CSNTM
2493	14th	Revelation†	15	Saint Catherine's Monastery, Gr. 1692, fol. 122-136	Sinai	Egypt	LOC, INTF, CSNTM
2494	1316	New Testament	315	Saint Catherine's Monastery, Gr. 1991	Sinai	Egypt	LOC, INTF, CSNTM
2495	15th	New Testament (Matthew† 10:21-28:20)	222	Saint Catherine's Monastery, Gr. 1992	Sinai	Egypt	LOC, INTF, CSNTM
2496	16th	Gospels	336	Saint Catherine's Monastery, Gr. 1993	Sinai	Egypt	LOC, CSNTM
2497	17th	Gospels	196	Saint Catherine's Monastery, Gr. 1994	Sinai	Egypt	LOC, INTF, CSNTM
2498	1622	Gospels	?	Saint Catherine's Monastery, Gr. 1995	Sinai	Egypt	
2499	13th-14th	Gospels	204	Saint Catherine's Monastery, Gr. 2038	Sinai	Egypt	LOC, INTF, CSNTM
2500	891	Gospels†	206	Library of the Russian Academy of Sciences, K'pel 74	Saint Petersburg	Russia	INTF

[top]

== Minuscules 2501–2600 ==
#	Date	Contents	Pages	Institution and refs.	City, State	Country	Images
2501	16th	Acts, Pauline Epistles, General Epistles	295	Saint Catherine's Monastery, Gr. 2051	Sinai	Egypt	LOC, INTF, CSNTM
2502	13th	Gospels†, Acts†, Pauline Epistles†, General Epistles†	131	Saint Catherine's Monastery, Gr. 2123	Sinai	Egypt	LOC, CSNTM
2503	14th	Gospels	233	Saint Catherine's Monastery, Gr. 2252	Sinai	Egypt	LOC, CSNTM
[2504]=1176							
2505	10th	Acts, General Epistles, Pauline Epistles	195	Ecumenical Patriarchate, 6	Istanbul	Turkey	
2506	13th	Gospels	245	Ecumenical Patriarchate, Chalki, Kamariotissis, 92 (95)	Istanbul	Turkey	
2507	12th	Gospels	305	Ecumenical Patriarchate, Skevophylakion, 5	Istanbul	Turkey	INTF
2508	14th	Gospels†, Acts†, General Epistles†, Pauline Epistles†	382	National Library, 20	Athens	Greece	INTF
2509	10th-11th	Gospels	299	National Library, 49	Athens	Greece	INTF
2510	13th	Gospels	337	National Library, 54	Athens	Greece	INTF
2511	14th	Acts, General Epistles, Pauline Epistles	273	Great Lavra Monastery, H' 114a	Mount Athos	Greece	INTF
2512	15th	Gospels	291	Skete of Kavsokalyvia, 89	Mount Athos	Greece	
2513	13th	Gospels	147	A. de Meibohm, 1	Chios	Greece	
2514	12th	Gospels	305	State Archives, Kod. GJ. 79	Tirana	Albania	CSNTM, INTF
2515	13th	Gospels	223	Village Library, 26	Dimitsana	Greece	INTF
2516	13th	Gospels†, Acts†, General Epistles†, Pauline Epistles†	278	Village Library, 27	Dimitsana	Greece	INTF
2517	11th	Gospels†	109	Ch. G. Sarros, 1	Athens	Greece	INTF
2518	14th	Gospels	228	Ch. G. Sarros, 2	Athens	Greece	INTF
2519	11th	John	1	Ch. G. Sarros, 18, 1	Athens	Greece	INTF
2520	13th	Gospels	296	Byzantine and Christian Museum, 147	Athens	Greece	INTF
2521	17th	Gospels	202	Byzantine and Christian Museum, 160	Athens	Greece	CSNTM
2522	13th	Gospels†	113	Byzantine and Christian Museum, 161	Athens	Greece	INTF
2523	15th	Gospels, Acts, General Epistles, Pauline Epistles	266	National Library, 2720	Athens	Greece	CSNTM
2523	15th	Gospels, Acts, General Epistles, Pauline Epistles	266	National Library, 2720	Athens	Greece	INTF
2524	14th	Gospels†	159	National Library, 2736	Athens	Greece	CSNTM
2525	13th	Gospels†	171	National Library, 2739	Athens	Greece	CSNTM
2526	14th	Gospels†	97	National Library, 2749	Athens	Greece	CSNTM
2527	14th	General Epistles†, Pauline Epistles†	121	National Library, 2760	Athens	Greece	CSNTM
2527	14th	General Epistles†, Pauline Epistles†	121	National Library, 2760	Athens	Greece	INTF
2528	13th-14th	Gospels	162	National Library, 2982	Athens	Greece	CSNTM
2528	13th-14th	Gospels	162	National Library, 2982	Athens	Greece	INTF
2529	12th-13th	Gospels†	100	Russian State Library, F.181.13 (Gr. 13)	Moscow	Russia	INTF
2530	1321	Gospels	286	Russian State Library, F.247.926 (Gr. 15)	Moscow	Russia	INTF
2531	10th	John†	1	Cambridge University Library, Dd. 3.50frag., fol. 160	Cambridge	United Kingdom	
[2532]=[288]							
2533	1271	Gospels	165	The Van Kampen Foundation, VK 903	(Unknown)	United States	CSNTM, INTF
2534	11th-12th	Mark†, Luke†	73	Library of the Russian Academy of Sciences, K'pel 73	Saint Petersburg	Russia	INTF
2535	11th-12th	Gospels†	97	Library of the Russian Academy of Sciences, K'pel 83	Saint Petersburg	Russia	INTF
2536	12th	Romans 1:1-5:12†	4	Library of the Russian Academy of Sciences, K'pel 90	Saint Petersburg	Russia	INTF
2537	12th-13th	Mark† 14:72-16:20, Luke†	8	The State Hermitage Museum, W 1162	Saint Petersburg	Russia	INTF
2538	13th	Zigabenus Commentary on Mark†	2	National Library of Russia, Gr. 664	Saint Petersburg	Russia	INTF
2539	11th	Gospels†	200	National Library of Russia, Gr. 667	Saint Petersburg	Russia	INTF
2540	13th	Luke† 24:39-53, John† 2:4-4:23; 9:34-11:12	6	National Library of Russia, Gr. 680	Saint Petersburg	Russia	INTF
2541	12th	Acts, General Epistles, Pauline Epistles	147	National Library of Russia, Gr. 693	Saint Petersburg	Russia	INTF
2542	13th	Matthew† 12:5-28:20, Mark, Luke 1:1-24:19†	168	National Library of Russia, Gr. 694	Saint Petersburg	Russia	INTF
2543	11th	John†	5	National Library of Russia, Gr. 776	Saint Petersburg	Russia	INTF
2544	16th	Acts, General Epistles, Pauline Epistles	200	National Library of Russia, Coll. D . Kirillo-Belozersky Monastery 120/125	Saint Petersburg	Russia	INTF
2545	10th	Gospels	235	State Historical Museum, 3644	Moscow	Russia	INTF
2546	12th	Gospels	220	State Historical Museum, 3646	Moscow	Russia	INTF
2547	12th	John†	2	Russian State Library, F.270.1a.73.2 (Gr. 170.2)	Moscow	Russia	INTF
2548	13th	Luke†	8	Russian State Library, F.270.1a.73.4 (Gr. 170.4)	Moscow	Russia	
2549	12th	Gospels†	8	Russian Academy of Sciences Branch, I. 114.1	Saint Petersburg	Russia	INTF
2549	12th	Gospels†	227	Vernadsky National Library of Ukraine, F. 72 (Gr. Sammlung), 1	Kyiv	Ukraine	INTF
2550	12th	Gospels	326	Odesa National Scientific Library, 567	Odesa	Ukraine	INTF
2551	13th	Matthew†, Luke†, John†	10	Mesrop Mashtots Institute of Ancient Manuscripts, 807, 919, 1197, 1249, 1251, 2105	Yerevan	Armenia	INTF
2552	12th	Luke†, John†	2	Mesrop Mashtots Institute of Ancient Manuscripts, 7168	Yerevan	Armenia	INTF
2553	12th	John†	>1	Mesrop Mashtots Institute of Ancient Manuscripts, 8546	Yerevan	Armenia	INTF
2554	14th	New Testament	382	National Museum of Art, Ms. 3 (Formerly: Romanian Academy, 3/12610)	Bucharest	Romania	INTF
2555	13th-14th	Gospels	262	National Museum of Art, Ms. 14 (Formerly: Romanian Academy, 14/126216)	Bucharest	Romania	INTF
[2556]=1873							
2557	12th	Matthew†, Mark† Luke†	129	Benaki Museum, MS 2	Athens	Greece	CSNTM, INTF
2558	13th	Acts†, General Epistles†, Pauline Epistles†	261	Benaki Museum, TA 34	Athens	Greece	CSNTM, INTF
2559	12th	Gospels†, (Matthew^{S})	261	Benaki Museum, TA 136	Athens	Greece	CSNTM, INTF
[2560]							
2561	11th	Gospels	294	Benaki Museum, MS 44	Athens	Greece	CSNTM, INTF
2562	12th	Gospels	189	Benaki Museum, MS 70	Athens	Greece	CSNTM, INTF
2563	11th	Matthew† 14:3-28:20, Mark, Luke, John 1:1-21:11†	168	Benaki Museum, TA 142	Athens	Greece	CSNTM, INTF
[2564]=ℓ2022							
[2565]=ℓ2023							
[2566]=ℓ2024							
2567	11th	Gospels†	241	State Archives, Ms 238	Athens	Greece	INTF
2568	13th	Matthew†, Mark† Luke†	5	Vatopedi Monastery, 1219, fol. 1-3.5-6	Mount Athos	Greece	INTF
2569	13th	John†	1	Vatopedi Monastery, 1219, fol. 4	Mount Athos	Greece	INTF
2570	12th	Acts† 1:13-24; 24:23-25:8; 1 Corinthians† 5:3-6:7	3	Vatopedi Monastery, 1219, fol. 9-11	Mount Athos	Greece	INTF
2571	11th	Gospels	264	Monastery of Paleokastritsa, Panagias 16	Corfu	Greece	INTF
2572	16th	Theophylact Commentary on the Pauline Epistles†	52	National Library, Panc. 171, fol.1-52	Florence	Italy	INTF
2573	16th	Theophylact Commentary on John†	183	Franzoniana Library, 21, fol. 119-301	Genoa	Italy	INTF
2574	12th	Chrysostom Commentary on Galatians 1:1-6:17†	54	Ambrosiana Library, A 172 sup., fol. 264-317	Milan	Italy	INTF
2575	16th	John†	172	Ambrosiana Library, A 184 sup.	Milan	Italy	INTF
2576	1286	Theophylact Commentary on Acts, Pauline Epistles	438	Ambrosiana Library, F 104 sup.	Milan	Italy	INTF
2577	14th	Theophylact Commentary on Matthew†	110	Ambrosiana Library, G 15 sup., fol. 74-183	Milan	Italy	INTF
2578	13th-14th	Theophylact Commentary on the Gospels	461	Ambrosiana Library, G 55 sup.	Milan	Italy	INTF
2579	16th	Matthew†, Mark†	281	Ambrosiana Library, D 161 inf., D 466 inf.	Milan	Italy	INTF
[2580]=837							
2581	17th	Matthew†,	122	Victor Emmanuel III National Library, ms. Branc.III.E. 13	Naples	Italy	INTF
2582	14th	Revelation	14	Vatican Library, Vat.gr.1908, fol. 105-118	Vatican City	Vatican City	DVL, INTF
2583	17th	Theophylact Commentary on Matthew†	17	Vatican Library, Vat.gr.2275, fol. 137-153	Vatican City	Vatican City	DVL, INTF
2584	13th	Mark†, Luke†, John†	98	Vatican Library, Vat.gr.2319	Vatican City	Vatican City	INTF
2585	11th	Gospels†	183	Vatican Library, Vat.gr.2330	Vatican City	Vatican City	DVL, INTF
2586	11th	Matthew† 5:25-28:20, Mark, Luke, John	243	Vatican Library, Vat.gr.2398	Vatican City	Vatican City	INTF
2587	11th	Acts† 5:1-28:31, General Epistles, Pauline Epistles	237	Vatican Library, Vat.gr.2503, fol. 1-237	Vatican City	Vatican City	DVL, INTF
2588	13th	Luke† 19:13-38	1	Vatican Library, Vat.gr.2503, fol. 238	Vatican City	Vatican City	DVL, INTF
2589	11th	Matthew† 11:29-12:31	1	Vatican Library, Vat.gr.2503, fol. 239	Vatican City	Vatican City	DVL, INTF
2590	13th	Gospels	239	Vatican Library, Vat.gr.2561	Vatican City	Vatican City	DVL, INTF
2591	15th	Gospels	304	Vatican Library, Vat.gr.2562	Vatican City	Vatican City	INTF
2592	11th	Gospels	261	Vatican Library, Vat.gr.2564	Vatican City	Vatican City	INTF
2593	14th	Luke† (Nicetas Catena)	289	Vatican Library, Vat.gr.2573	Vatican City	Vatican City	INTF
2594	16th	Andreas of Caesarea Commentary on Revelation†	58	Turin National University Library, C.III.8	Turin	Italy	INTF
2595	15th	Andreas of Caesarea Commentary on Revelation	16	Marciana National Library, Gr. Z. 494 (331), fol. 248-263	Venice	Italy	INTF
2596	11th	Chrysostom Commentary on Galatians† 1:16-6:18	54	Marciana National Library, Gr. II,178 (1051), fol. 1-54	Venice	Italy	INTF
2597	16th	Theophylact Commentary on Matthew†	47	Marciana National Library, Gr. I,39 (1144), fol. 1-47	Venice	Italy	INTF
2598	13th-14th	Gospels	323	National and University Library, Ms. 1916	Strasbourg	France	BnF, CSNTM
2598	13th-14th	Gospels	323	National and University Library, Ms. 1916	Strasbourg	France	INTF
2599	13th	Luke†	1	Royal Library of Belgium, II 2404, 4	Brussels	Belgium	
2600	13th	Luke† 20:19-24:53, John†	46	Abbey Library, T. 277	Linköping	Sweden	INTF

[top]

== Minuscules 2601–2700 ==
#	Date	Contents	Pages	Institution and refs.	City, State	Country	Images
2601	12th	Luke†	1	Bodleian Library, MS. Auct. T. inf. 1. 4, fol. 133	Oxford	United Kingdom	INTF
[2602]=851							
2603	12th	Gospels	255	Chester Beatty Library, CBL W 134	Dublin	Ireland	CSNTM
2603	12th	Gospels	255	Chester Beatty Library, CBL W 134	Dublin	Ireland	INTF
2604	12th	Gospels	378	Chester Beatty Library, CBL W 139	Dublin	Ireland	CSNTM
2604	12th	Gospels	378	Chester Beatty Library, CBL W 139	Dublin	Ireland	INTF
2605	13th	Gospels	176	Chester Beatty Library, CBL W 140	Dublin	Ireland	CSNTM
2606	13th	Gospels	119	Chester Beatty Library, CBL W 141	Dublin	Ireland	CSNTM
2606	13th	Gospels	119	Chester Beatty Library, CBL W 141	Dublin	Ireland	INTF
2607	13th	Matthew† 14:34-15:28, 27:45-28:20; Mark 1:1-14:51† Luke 1:1-2:20†	47	Houghton Library, Harvard University, MS Gr 22	Cambridge, MA	United States	HL
2607	13th	Matthew† 14:34-15:28, 27:45-28:20; Mark 1:1-14:51† Luke 1:1-2:20†	47	Houghton Library, Harvard University, MS Gr 22	Cambridge, MA	United States	INTF
2608	13th	Gospels†	340	The University of Chicago Library, Ms. 202	Chicago, IL	United States	TUOCL
2608	13th	Gospels†	340	The University of Chicago Library, Ms. 202	Chicago, IL	United States	INTF
[2609]=2474							
2610	13th	Gospels †	117	The University of Chicago Library, Ms. 62	Chicago, IL	United States	TUOCL
2610	13th	Gospels †	117	The University of Chicago Library, Ms. 62	Chicago, IL	United States	INTF
[2611]=677							
2612	13th	Mark, Luke, John, Matthew	184	Duke University, Gk MS 5	Durham	United States	INTF
2613	11th	Gospels	321	Duke University, Gk MS 6	Durham	United States	DU
2613	11th	Gospels	321	Duke University, Gk MS 6	Durham	United States	INTF
2614	13th	Gospels†	272	Duke University, Gk MS 7	Durham	United States	DU
2615	12th	Gospels	248	Duke University, Gk MS 15	Durham	United States	DU
2615	12th	Gospels	248	Duke University, Gk MS 15	Durham	United States	INTF
2616	12th	Gospels	280	Duke University, Gk MS 16	Durham	United States	DU
[2617]=2491							
[2618]=927							
2619	17th	Acts†, Pauline Epistles†	96	Yale University Library, Beinecke MS 246	New Haven, CT	United States	YUL
2619	17th	Acts†, Pauline Epistles†	96	Yale University Library, Beinecke MS 246	New Haven, CT	United States	CSNTM
2620	13th	Gospels	258	Yale University Library, Beinecke MS 308	New Haven, CT	United States	INTF
2621	1380	Gospels	177	Princeton University Art Museum, 57-19	Princeton, NJ	United States	PUAM
2622	12th	Gospels	126	Austrian National Library, Suppl. gr. 164	Vienna	Austria	INTF
2623	11th	Gospels	262	National Library, 1	Ochrid	North Macedonia	INTF
2624	13th	Gospels	389	National Library, 2	Ochrid	North Macedonia	INTF
2625	12th	Acts†, General Epistles†, Pauline Epistles†, Revelation†	290	National Library, 13	Ochrid	North Macedonia	INTF
2626	14th	Acts†, General Epistles†, Pauline Epistles†, Revelation 1:1-18:3†	178	National Library, 14	Ochrid	North Macedonia	INTF
2627	13th	Acts†, General Epistles†, Pauline Epistles†	97	National Library, 15	Ochrid	North Macedonia	INTF
[2628]=ℓ2127							
2629	14th	1 Corinthians - Hebrews†	74	National Library, 18, fol. 1-74	Ochrid	North Macedonia	INTF
2630	16th	Gospels †	198	Panachrantos Monastery, 43	Andros	Greece	
2631	13th	Mark†	28	S. Loberdos (Private Collection), 2	Athens	Greece	INTF
2632	12th	John†	32	S. Loberdos (Private Collection), 3	Athens	Greece	INTF
2633	13th	Gospels†	232	S. Loberdos (Private Collection), 4	Athens	Greece	INTF
2634	14th	Gospels	187	S. Loberdos (Private Collection), 5	Athens	Greece	INTF
2635	1568	Gospels	291	S. Loberdos (Private Collection), 10	Athens	Greece	INTF
2636	16th	Matthew†, John†	286	S. Loberdos (Private Collection), 13	Athens	Greece	INTF
2637	11th	Gospels	356	S. Loberdos (Private Collection), 63	Athens	Greece	INTF
2638	14th	Commentary on Revelation 1:1-15:7†	19	Great Lavra Monastery, H' 205, fol. 119-137	Mount Athos	Greece	INTF
2639	13th	Ephesians† 4:9-25; Philippians† 1:14-2:2	3	E. Anemis, 2, Einband	Patmos	Greece	INTF
[2640]=2108							
2641	14th	Gospels†	243	University of California, Davis, BS2551 A4 no. 2641	Davis, California	United States	UC-B
2642	11th	Gospels†	253	University of California, Davis, BS2551 A4 no. 2642	Davis, California	United States	UC-B
2643	13th	Gospels , Revelation	181	University of California, Riverside	Riverside, CA	United States	INTF
2644	13th	Gospels†	184	University of California, BS2551 A2 1100z	Santa Barbara, CA	United States	
2645	13th	Gospels †	147	Giromeri Monastery	Epirus	Greece	INTF
2645	13th	Gospels †	154	John Rylands University Library, Gr. Ms. 21	Manchester	United Kingdom	INTF
2646	13th	Zigabenus Commentary on the Gospels†	319	Christ Church, Wake 51	Oxford	United Kingdom	INTF
2647	13th	Gospels†	329	Panagia Hozoviotissa Monastery, 1	Amorgos	Greece	INTF
2648	15th	Revelation 19:11-21:9†	2	Zoodochos Pigi Monastery (Hagias), 43, fol. 243-244	Andros	Greece	INTF
2649	1108	Gospels	254	Byzantine and Christian Museum, 204	Athens	Greece	INTF
2650	12th	Gospels †	187	Byzantine and Christian Museum, 227	Athens	Greece	INTF
2650	12th	Gospels †	187	Byzantine and Christian Museum, 227	Athens	Greece	CSNTM
2651	1315	Gospels †	85	Gennadius Library, Ms. 1.6	Athens	Greece	CSNTM, INTF
2652	15th	Acts, General Epistles, Pauline Epistles	199	National Library, 103	Athens	Greece	CSNTM
2653	15th	Gospels †, Acts†, General Epistles†, Pauline Epistles†	295	National Library, 2925	Athens	Greece	CSNTM
2654	14th	Luke†	1	National Library, 2925, fol. 90	Athens	Greece	CSNTM
2655	11th	Luke†	6	National Library, 2925, fol. 91.92.99-102	Athens	Greece	CSNTM
2656	17th	Gospels , Revelation	316	National Library, 3110	Athens	Greece	CSNTM
2657	12th	Mark†	2	Athens University History Museum, 34	Athens	Greece	AU
2657	12th	Mark†	2	Athens University History Museum, 34	Athens	Greece	INTF
2658	13th	Gospels†	216	Benaki Museum, MS TA 320	Athens	Greece	CSNTM, INTF
2659	16th	Theophylact Commentary on the Pauline Epistles	310	Benaki Museum, MS 8	Athens	Greece	CSNTM, INTF
2660	13th	Gospels	309	Benaki Museum, MS 45	Athens	Greece	CSNTM, INTF
2661	11th	Gospels†	157	Benaki Museum, MS 47	Athens	Greece	CSNTM, INTF
2662	12th	Matthew†	1	Vatopedi Monastery, 1213, fol. 82	Mount Athos	Greece	INTF
2663	16th	Revelation	30	Dionysiou Monastery, 148, fol. 71-100	Mount Athos	Greece	
2664	17th	Revelation	41	Dionysiou Monastery, fol. 53-93	Mount Athos	Greece	
2665	1274	Gospels	112	Docheiariou Monastery, 10	Mount Athos	Greece	INTF
2666	14th	Gospels†	122	Docheiariou Monastery, 58	Mount Athos	Greece	INTF
2667	16th	Revelation	18	Koutloumousiou Monastery, 165, fol. 267-284	Mount Athos	Greece	INTF
2668	14th	Zigabenus Commentary on Ephesians†	8	Great Lavra Monastery, K' 84, fol. 304-311	Mount Athos	Greece	INTF
2669	16th	Revelation	39	Great Lavra Monastery, L' 74, fol. 331-369	Mount Athos	Greece	INTF
2670	13th	Gospels †	260	Great Lavra Monastery, M' 1	Mount Athos	Greece	INTF
2671	12th	Acts†	1	St. Panteleimon Monastery, 98,4	Mount Athos	Greece	INTF
2672	15th	Revelation	35	St. Panteleimon Monastery, 479, fol. 246-280	Mount Athos	Greece	INTF
2673	15th	Gospels	207	Village Library, 159	Dimitsana	Greece	INTF
2674	1651	Acts, General Epistles, Pauline Epistles	158	Monastery of Olympiotissa, 7	Elassona	Greece	INTF
2675	14th	Acts†, General Epistles†, Pauline Epistles†	306	Archaeological Museum, 5	Almyros	Greece	INTF
2676	13th	Gospels	298	Archaeological Museum, 44	Ioannina	Greece	CSNTM
2676	13th	Gospels	298	Archaeological Museum, 44	Ioannina	Greece	INTF
2677	13th	Luke†	10	Katerini	Ioannina	Greece	INTF
2678	13th	Gospels†	176	Jakovatos	Lixouri, Cephalonia	Greece	INTF
2679	15th	Gospels†	159	Hagiassos Panagias, 11, fol. 3-161	Lesbos	Greece	INTF
2680	13th	Gospels	332	Hagiassos Panagias, 12	Lesbos	Greece	INTF
2681	17th	Revelation	55	Leimonos Monastery, Ms. Lesbiacus Leimonos 219, fol. 64-118	Kalloni, Lesbos	Greece	INTF
2682	13th	John†	8	Leimonos Monastery, Ms. Lesbiacus Leimonos 360	Kalloni, Lesbos	Greece	LM
2682	13th	John†	8	Leimonos Monastery, Ms. Lesbiacus Leimonos 360	Kalloni, Lesbos	Greece	INTF
2683	13th	Gospels†	198	Monastery of Varlaam, 1	Meteora	Greece	INTF
2684	11th	Gospels	254	Monastery of Varlaam, 2	Meteora	Greece	INTF
2685	15th	Gospels, Romans, Hebrews	313	Monastery of Varlaam, 3	Meteora	Greece	INTF
2686	15th	Gospels†	152	Monastery of Varlaam, 4	Meteora	Greece	INTF
2687	12th	Gospels	198	Monastery of Varlaam, Skevophylakion 27	Meteora	Greece	INTF
2687	12th	Gospels	1	National Library of Russia, Gr. 301	Saint Petersburg	Russia	INTF
2688	13th	Gospels	168	Monastery of Varlaam, Skevophylakion 35	Meteora	Greece	INTF
2689	14th	Gospels	265	Great Meteoron Monastery, 35	Meteora	Greece	INTF
2690	16th	Zigabenus Commentary on the Pauline Epistles†	283	Great Meteoron Monastery, 65	Meteora	Greece	INTF
2691	15th	Gospels , Acts, Pauline Epistles, General Epistles	342	Great Meteoron Monastery, 114	Meteora	Greece	INTF
2692	15th	Gospels	356	Great Meteoron Monastery, 236	Meteora	Greece	INTF
2693	11th	Gospels†^{s}	234	Great Meteoron Monastery, 245	Meteora	Greece	INTF
2694	12th	Gospels	283	Great Meteoron Monastery, 253	Meteora	Greece	INTF
2695	12th	Gospels	216	Great Meteoron Monastery, 255	Meteora	Greece	INTF
2696	13th	Acts, General Epistles, Pauline Epistles	220	Great Meteoron Monastery, 302	Meteora	Greece	INTF
2697	13th	Gospels †	72	Great Meteoron Monastery, 392, 64 fol., 629, 8 fol.	Meteora	Greece	INTF
2698	14th	Romans 1:5-3:17	9	Great Meteoron Monastery, 503	Meteora	Greece	INTF
2699	13th	Matthew†, Mark†	40	Great Meteoron Monastery, 506	Meteora	Greece	INTF
2700	12th	1 Corinthians†	2	Great Meteoron Monastery, 525	Meteora	Greece	INTF

[top]

== Minuscules 2701–2800 ==
#	Date	Contents	Pages	Institution and refs.	City, State	Country	Images
2701	14th	Gospels†	393	Great Meteoron Monastery, 539	Meteora	Greece	INTF
2702	12th	Gospels	284	Great Meteoron Monastery, 540	Meteora	Greece	INTF
2703	15th	Gospels	215	Great Meteoron Monastery, 541	Meteora	Greece	INTF
2704	15th	Acts, Pauline Epistles, General Epistles	307	Great Meteoron Monastery, 542	Meteora	Greece	INTF
2705	14th	Gospels , Acts, Pauline Epistles, General Epistles	260	Great Meteoron Monastery, 543	Meteora	Greece	INTF
2706	15th	Gospels	185	Great Meteoron Monastery, 544	Meteora	Greece	INTF
2707	13th	Gospels	328	Great Meteoron Monastery, 545	Meteora	Greece	INTF
2708	16th	Gospels	360	Great Meteoron Monastery, 574	Meteora	Greece	INTF
2709	1377	Gospels	172	Great Meteoron Monastery, 580	Meteora	Greece	INTF
2710	14th	Gospels	229	Great Meteoron Monastery, 582	Meteora	Greece	
2711	16th	Luke†, John†	183	Great Meteoron Monastery, 590	Meteora	Greece	INTF
2712	12th	Acts†, General Epistles†, Pauline Epistles†	258	Monastery of St. Stephen, 4	Meteora	Greece	INTF
2713	14th	Gospels	365	Monastery of St. Stephen, 11	Meteora	Greece	INTF
2714	16th	Gospels	312	Monastery of St. Stephen, 12	Meteora	Greece	INTF
2715	16th	Gospels	174	Monastery of St. Stephen, 39	Meteora	Greece	
2716	14th	Acts†, General Epistles†, Pauline Epistles†, Revelation†	197	Monastery of St. Stephen, Triados 25	Meteora	Greece	INTF
2717	13th	John†	8	Monastery of St. Stephen, Triados 118	Meteora	Greece	INTF
2718	12th	Gospels †, Acts†, General Epistles†, Pauline Epistles†	286	Lindos Panagias, 4, fol. 1-166.175-244	Rhodes	Greece	INTF
2719	13th	Gospels	239	Lindos Panagias, 6	Rhodes	Greece	INTF
2720	12th	Theophylact Commentary on Luke, John†,	24	A. Brontis	Athens	Greece	INTF
2721	16th	Gospels	258	High School, 392	Sopoto	Greece	
2722	10th	Gospels †	264	Municipal Library, 13	Tyrnavos	Greece	INTF
[2723]=2382							
2724	13th	Gospels	313	Zavorda Monastery of St. Nikanor, 7	Grevena	Greece	INTF
2725	12th	Gospels †	163	Zavorda Monastery of St. Nikanor, 17	Grevena	Greece	INTF
2726	13th	Gospels	194	Zavorda Monastery of St. Nikanor, 18	Grevena	Greece	INTF
2727	12th	Gospels	239	Zavorda Monastery of St. Nikanor, 27	Grevena	Greece	INTF
2728	15th	Gospels	453	Zavorda Monastery of St. Nikanor, 30	Grevena	Greece	INTF
2729	15th	Gospels †	152	Zavorda Monastery of St. Nikanor, 62, fol. 20-171	Grevena	Greece	INTF
2730	14th	Gospels	275	Zavorda Monastery of St. Nikanor, 63	Grevena	Greece	INTF
2731	14th	Acts, General Epistles, Pauline Epistles	261	Zavorda Monastery of St. Nikanor, 80	Grevena	Greece	INTF
2732	1294	Gospels	336	Zavorda Monastery of St. Nikanor, 90	Grevena	Greece	INTF
2733	1227	Acts†, General Epistles†, Pauline Epistles (lacks 1 Corinthians, 1 Thessalonians)†	252	Zavorda Monastery of St. Nikanor, 99	Grevena	Greece	INTF
2734	1397	Gospels	227	Zavorda Monastery of St. Nikanor, 102	Grevena	Greece	INTF
2735	13th	Theophylact Commentary on the Gospels	404	Zavorda Monastery of St. Nikanor, 109	Grevena	Greece	INTF
2736	15th	General Epistles†, Pauline Epistles†	290	Zavorda Monastery of St. Nikanor, 125	Grevena	Greece	INTF
2737	1559	Gospels , Acts^{P}	123	Vatican Library, Arch.Cap.S.Pietro.D.157	Vatican City	Vatican City	DVL
2737	1559	Gospels , Acts^{P}	123	Vatican Library, Arch.Cap.S.Pietro.D.157	Vatican City	Vatican City	INTF
2738	12th	Theophylact Commentary on Mark	84	Vatican Apostolic Library, Vat.gr.642, fol. 97-180	Vatican City	Vatican City	DVL, INTF
2739	14th	Zigabenus Commentary on the Pauline Epistles†	309	Vatican Library, Vat.gr.1501	Vatican City	Vatican City	INTF
2740	15th	Matthew	1	Vatican Library, Vat.gr.1571, fol. 72	Vatican City	Vatican City	DVL, INTF
2741	11th	1 Peter† 4:17-5:7	1	Vatican Library, Vat.lat.125, fol. II	Vatican City	Vatican City	DVL
2742	11th	Matthew^{P}	2	Vatican Library, Barb.gr.418, fol. 9.15	Vatican City	Vatican City	INTF
2743	16th	Revelation† 1:1-6:10	27	Vatican Library, Reg. gr. 46, fol. 131-157	Vatican City	Vatican City	INTF, DVL
2744	12th	Mark^{P} 10:25-35	1	C.W. Adam, Inv. Nr. 2550	Goslar	Germany	INTF
2745	12th	Gospels†	1	Archaeological Institute of the University of Cologne, Inv. Nr. 523	Cologne	Germany	INTF
2745	12th	Gospels†	308	Metropolis Library	Larnaca	Cyprus	INTF
2746	11th	Acts†, General Epistles†, Pauline Epistles†	244	Royal Library of Belgium, IV. 303	Brussels	Belgium	INTF
2747	15th	Gospels	238	St.St. Cyril and Methodius National Library, Gr. 14	Sofia	Bulgaria	INTF
2748	12th-13th	Gospels †	127	St.St. Cyril and Methodius National Library, Gr. 7	Sofia	Bulgaria	INTF
2749	12th	Gospels	240	Russian Academy of Sciences Branch St. Petersburg, Hist. Inst. 10/667	Saint Petersburg	Russia	INTF
2750	13th	Mark†, Luke†, John†	101	Ecumenical Patriarchate, ehem. Chalki, Theol. Schule, 189	Istanbul	Turkey	INTF
2751	13th	Matthew† 27:23-27:38, 28:4-28:20; Luke† 7:47-24:53; John† 1:1-17:26	94	The University of Chicago Library, Ms. 902 (Goodspeed)	Chicago, IL	USA	TUOCL
2752	11th-12th	Gospels†	108	Gordon College Library, Gr. Ms. 1	Wenham, MA	USA	INTF
2753	13th	Matthew	6	Gordon College Library, Gr. Ms. 1	Wenham, MA	USA	INTF
2754	11th	Gospels†	256	Bible Museum, Ms. 8	Münster	Germany	CSNTM, INTF
2755	11th	Matthew and Mark†	370	Bible Museum, Ms. 9	Münster	Germany	CSNTM, INTF
2756	13th	Gospels	195	Bible Museum, Ms. 10	Münster	Germany	CSNTM, INTF
2757	13th	Gospels	272	Duke University, Gk MS 38	Durham	USA	DU
2757	13th	Gospels	272	Duke University, Gk MS 38	Durham	USA	INTF
2758	1311	Gospels †	290	Monastery of Saint John the Theologian, 891	Patmos	Greece	CSNTM
2758	1311	Gospels †	290	Monastery of Saint John the Theologian, 891	Patmos	Greece	INTF
2759	16th	Revelation	85	Vatican Apostolic Library, Arch.Cap.S.Pietro.C.151, fol. 21-105	Vatican City	Vatican City	INTF
2760	12th	Gospels	260	Romanian Academy, Ms. Gr. 1175	Bucharest	Romania	INTF
2761	13th	Mark^{P}, Luke^{P}, John^{P}	13	Romanian Academy, Ms. Gr. 934	Bucharest	Romania	INTF
2762	12th	John^{P}	1	Library and Information Centre of the Hungarian Academy of Sciences, K 490 (Moravcsik 03)	Budapest	Hungary	INTF
[2763]=1304							
[2764]=2936							
2765	14th	Gospels	300	Bodleian Library, MS. Canon. Gr. 38	Oxford	United Kingdom	INTF
2765	14th	Gospels	300	Bodleian Library, MS. Canon. Gr. 38	Oxford	United Kingdom	DB
2766	13th	Gospels	147	Duke University, Gk MS 31	Durham	USA	DU
2766	13th	Gospels	147	Duke University, Gk MS 31	Durham	USA	INTF
2767	13th-14th	Gospels	289	Mus. de arta relig., 32/69081	Bucharest	Romania	INTF
2768	978	John	128	Bavarian State Library, Gr. 208	Munich	Germany	INTF, BSB
2769	11th-12th	Matthew^{P}	4	Vatican Library, Vat.gr.1853, fol. 96-99	Vatican City	Vatican City	DVL
2769	11th-12th	Matthew^{P}	4	Vatican Library, Vat.gr.1853, fol. 96-99	Vatican City	Vatican City	INTF
2770	16th	Matthew	21	Vatican Library, Vat.gr.1909, fol. 120-140	Vatican City	Vatican City	DVL, INTF
2771	13th	Gospels	272	Lambeth Palace, MS2795	London	United Kingdom	LP
2772	13th	Acts^{P}†, General Epistles^{P}†, Pauline Epistles^{P}†	139	Ecclesiastical Historical and Archival Institute of the Patriarchate of Bulgaria, 24 (236)	Sofia	Bulgaria	INTF
2773	14th	Gospels †	163	Ecclesiastical Historical and Archival Institute of the Patriarchate of Bulgaria, 18 (342)	Sofia	Bulgaria	INTF
2774	13th-14th	Gospels , Acts, General Epistles, Pauline Epistles	349	Ecclesiastical Historical and Archival Institute of the Patriarchate of Bulgaria, 18 (342)	Sofia	Bulgaria	INTF
2775	14th	Gospels †	261	Ecclesiastical Historical and Archival Institute of the Patriarchate of Bulgaria, 22 (905)	Sofia	Bulgaria	INTF
2776	17th	Acts, General Epistles, Pauline Epistles, Revelation	250	Holy Synod of the Church of Greece	Athens	Greece	INTF
2777	14th	Acts†, General Epistles†, Pauline Epistles†	217	Koronis Monastery, 34	Karditsa	Greece	INTF
2778	12th	Acts^{P}	9	Koronis Monastery	Karditsa	Greece	INTF
2779	15th	Gospels†	349	Historical Museum of Crete	Heraklion, Crete	Greece	INTF
2780	14th	Gospels†	288	Panagias	Vonitsa	Greece	INTF
2781	12th	Gospels†	199	Metropolis Library	Pyrgos, Elis	Greece	INTF
2782	11th	Gospels†	176	Library of the Metropolis of Samos, 16, 171 fol.; 81, 5 fol.	Samos	Greece	INTF
2783	14th	Gospels†	316	Library of the Metropolis of Samos, 23	Samos	Greece	
2784	11th-12th	Matthew^{P}, Mark^{P}	36	Library of the Metropolis of Samos, 26	Samos	Greece	INTF
2785	12th	Mark^{P}, Luke^{P}	40	Library of the Metropolis of Samos, 27	Samos	Greece	INTF
2786	14th	Gospels	226	Prophet Elijah Monastery, 28	Santorini	Greece	INTF
2787	12th	Gospels†	306	Museum of the Holy Monastery of Kykkos (Formerly: Church of St. Luke)	Kykkos	Cyprus	INTF
2788	13th	Gospels†	181	Metropolis Library, fol. 70-250	Kyrenia	Cyprus	INTF
2789	10th	John^{P}	1	Metropolis Library	Kyrenia	Cyprus	INTF
2790	10th-11th	Gospels†	227	S. M. Logidou (Private Collection)	Kaimakli	Cyprus	INTF
2791	12th	Gospels†	129	Saint Neophytos Monastery	Paphos	Cyprus	INTF
2792	12th	Matthew^{P}, Mark^{P} Luke^{P}	8	Kentron Epistim. Erevnon	Nicosia	Cyprus	
2792	12th	Matthew^{P}, Mark^{P} Luke^{P}	8	Mitropolis	Paphos	Cyprus	
2793	13th	Gospel of Matthew 22:7–22	1	Bible Museum, Ms. 11	Münster	Germany	CSNTM, INTF
2794	12th	Gospels†, Revelation 1:1-22:12†	152	Duke University, Greek MS 100	Durham, NC	United States	DU
2794	12th	Gospels†, Revelation 1:1-22:12†	152	Duke University, Greek MS 100	Durham, NC	United States	INTF
2795	13th	1 Peter 4:3-5:6; 1 John 3:12-4:10	2	Austrian National Library, Suppl. gr. 119	Vienna	Austria	ANL
2796	13th	Luke^{P}	71	State Library, Cim I, 7	Oldenburg	Germany	
2797	14th	Acts^{P}	8	Saint Catherine's Monastery, N. E. M 29	Sinai	Egypt	
2798	12th	Mark^{P}	7	Saint Catherine's Monastery, N. E. M 93	[Sinai	Egypt	
2799	14th	Acts^{P}, General Epistles^{P}, Pauline Epistles^{P}	186	Saint Catherine's Monastery, N. E. M 120	Sinai	Egypt	
2800	10th	Matthew†, Mark†	31	Saint Catherine's Monastery, N. E. M 171	Sinai	Egypt	

[top]

== Minuscules 2801–2900 ==
#	Date	Contents	Pages	Institution and refs.	City, State	Country	Images
2801	12th	John^{P}	16	Saint Catherine's Monastery, N. E. M 183	Sinai	Egypt	
2802	11th	Luke^{P}	1	Osiou Gregoriou Monastery, 158 B, fol. 24	Mount Athos	Greece	INTF
2803	14th	Gospels†, Acts†, General Epistles†, Pauline Epistles†	224	Skete of Saint Demetre, 53	Mount Athos	Greece	
2804	13th	Gospels	220	Chrysopodaritissis Monastery, 1	Patras	Greece	INTF
2805	12th/13th	Acts, Pauline epistles, General Epistles	155	Daniel P. Buttafuoco Library	Woodbury, NY	United States	Christie's
2805	12th/13th	Acts, Pauline epistles, General Epistles	155	Daniel P. Buttafuoco Library	Woodbury, NY	United States	INTF
2806	1518	Gospels	354	Saint Vissarionos (Dusan) Monastery, 5	Trikala	Greece	INTF
2807	13th	Hebrews^{P}	>1	National Library of Serbia, RS 657	Belgrade	Serbia	
2808	13th/14th	Gospels	167	Kalymnos Municipal Library, 1	Kalymnos	Greece	INTF
2809	14th	Gospels	300	Kalymnos Municipal Library, 2	Kalymnos	Greece	INTF
2810	1514	Gospels	270	Tatarnis Monastery, 2	Tripotama	Greece	CSNTM
2811	9th-10th	Gospels†	158	School of Theology Library, 1	Boston, MA	USA	INTF
2812	10th	Gospels	596	National Library, Res. 235:302	Madrid	Spain	BDH
2812	10th	Gospels	596	National Library, Res. 235:302	Madrid	Spain	INTF
2813	13th	Luke†, John†	151	Museum of the Bible, GC.MS.000876	Washington, DC	USA	CSNTM
2814	12th	Andreas of Caesarea Commentary of Book of Revelation	94	University Library, Cod. I.1.4.1	Augsburg	Germany	UL, INTF
2815	12th	Acts, General Epistles, Pauline Epistles	216	Basel University Library, A. N. IV. 4	Basel	Switzerland	INTF
2816	15th	Acts, General Epistles, Pauline Epistles	287	Basel University Library, A. N. IV. 5	Basel	Switzerland	INTF, BUL
2817	12th	Pauline epistles	387	Basel University Library, A. N. III. 11	Basel	Switzerland	INTF, BUL
2818	12th	Acts, General Epistles	245	New College, 58	Oxford	United Kingdom	INTF
2819	12th	Matthew 6:6–20	1	National Library, Supplement Grec 1035, 13, fol. 28	Paris	France	INTF
2820	14th	2 Timothy 4:16–22	1	National Library, Supplement Grec 1035, 13, fol. 17	Paris	France	INTF
2821	14th	Revelation	22	Cambridge University Library, Dd. 9.69, fol. 295-316	Cambridge	United Kingdom	INTF
2822	12th	James^{P}, Jude^{P}	2	British Library, Add MS 11860, fol. 3.7	London	United Kingdom	BL
2823	11th	Luke^{P}	1	British Library, Add MS 11860, fol. 8	London	United Kingdom	BL
2824	14th	Revelation†	13	Orthodoxes Patriarchat, Stavru, 94, fol. 236-248	Jerusalem	Israel	LOC, INTF, CSNTM
2825	12th	Mark^{P}	2	St. Panteleimon Monastery, 97a, Nr. 4	Mount Athos	Greece	
2826	12th	Matthew^{P}	2	St. Panteleimon Monastery, 97a, Nr. 5	Mount Athos	Greece	
2827	11th	Matthew^{P}	2	St. Panteleimon Monastery, 97a, Nr. 6	Mount Athos	Greece	
2828	12th	John^{P}	1	Xenophontos Monastery, Ia' ?	Mount Athos	Greece	
2829	12th	Acts^{P}	5	St. Panteleimon Monastery, 98, 2	Mount Athos	Greece	INTF
2830	14th	2 Corinthians^{P}, Galatians^{P}	2	St. Panteleimon Monastery, 98, 3	Mount Athos	Greece	INTF
2831	13th	Gospels†	110	Vatopedi Monastery, 889, p. 17-236	Mount Athos	Greece	INTF
2832	14th	Matthew^{P}	6	Vatopedi Monastery, 889, p. 237-248	Mount Athos	Greece	INTF
2833	11th	Acts^{P}	4	Vatopedi Monastery, 889, p. 249-256	Mount Athos	Greece	INTF
2834	13th	Ephesians^{P}, Colossians^{P}, Hebrews^{P}	3	Vatopedi Monastery, 889, p. 257-262	Mount Athos	Greece	INTF
2835	10th-11th	Matthew† 1:20-10:29	22	Benaki Museum, MS 146	Athens	Greece	CSNTM, INTF
2836	12th	Matthew^{P}	34	The Schøyen Collection, MS 694/1	Oslo	Norway	INTF
2836	12th	Matthew^{P}	34	The Schøyen Collection, MS 694/1	London	United Kingdom	INTF
2837	14th	Matthew^{P}	154	Russian State Archive, F. 1607, No. 23	Moscow	Russia	
2838	15th	Matthew†, Luke†	151	Austrian National Library, Theol. gr. 277, fol. 77-227	Vienna	Austria	
2839	16th	Titus 1:5-2:10; 2:15-3:7	2	Vatican Library, Vat.gr.1190, fol. 1110-1111	Vatican City	Vatican City	DVL
2840	16th	1 Timothy^{P}, 2 Timothy^{P}	19	Royal Library of Belgium, IV 100, fol. 52-70	Brussels	Belgium	
[2841]=1142							
2842	14th	Matthew^{P}	3	Royal Site of San Lorenzo de El Escorial, X. IV. 6, fol. 8-10	San Lorenzo de El Escorial	Spain	
2843	16th	Revelation 1:1-7:17†	8	Orthodoxes Patriarchat, Saba, 373, fol. 392-399	Jerusalem	Israel	INTF
2844	10th	John^{P}	5	J.F. Reed Library, ms 3.(16)	King of Prussia, PA	USA	
2845	15th	Revelation	16	Bodleian Library, MS. Holkham Gr. 30(54), fol. 307-322	Oxford	United Kingdom	INTF
2846	12th	Revelation	18	National Library, Grec 977, fol. 226-243	Paris	France	BnF, INTF
2847	16th	1 John^{P}†, Revelation^{P}†	50	National Library, Grec 1060, fol. 127-176	Paris	France	BnF, INTF
2848	15th	Acts^{P}	44	National Library, Grec 1164, fol. 294-337	Paris	France	BnF
2849	14th-15th	Acts, General Epistles, Pauline Epistles, Revelation	156	Monastery of Longovardas, ms. 27 (724), fol. 1-156	Paros	Greece	
[2850]=2491							
2851	12th	Matthew^{P}	1	St. Panteleimon Monastery, 97,5	Mount Athos	Greece	
2852	13th	Galatians^{P} 6:8-18, Ephesians^{P} 1:1-22	2	The Schøyen Collection, MS 1693	Oslo	Norway	INTF
2852	13th	Galatians^{P} 6:8-18, Ephesians^{P} 1:1-22	2	The Schøyen Collection, MS 1693	London	United Kingdom	INTF
2853	10th-11th	Acts, General Epistles, Pauline Epistles	170	Owner unknown. Last: Basel, Bibliothek G. Zakos			
2854	10th	Gospels†	131	Exarchist Monastery of Saint Mary, A. a. 11.13, fol. 1-131	Grottaferrata	Italy	
2855	12th	Book of Revelation 12:12–13:13	1	The Schøyen Collection, Ms 1906	Oslo	Norway	INTF
2856	12th	Gospels	244	Ecclesiastical Historical and Archival Institute of the Patriarchate of Bulgaria, EHAI 949	Sofia	Bulgaria	
2857	1272	Gospels	305	Kremlin Museum, 11968 oxr. 10567 op.	Moscow	Russia	
2858	12th	Matthew 5:33–6:1; 9:2–15	2	Pushkin Museum, N 4790	Moscow	Russia	
2859	13th	Gospel of Luke 20:1–22:8	6	Pushkin Museum, N 4792	Moscow	Russia	
2860	10th	Gospels	180	The Van Kampen Foundation, VK 901	(Unknown)	USA	CSNTM
2860	10th	Gospels	9	Museum of the Bible, G.C.MS.000376.1-9	Washington, DC	USA	
2860	10th	Gospels	1	Adrian Herren	Pensacola, FL	USA	
2861	1300	Gospels	315	Duke University, Greek MS 064	Durham, NC	USA	DU
2862	1150–1174	Gospels	176	Duke University, Greek MS 084	Durham, NC	USA	DU
2863	12th	Gospels	262	Houghton Library, Harvard University, MS Typ. 294 (fol. 1- 262)	Cambridge, MA	USA	HL
2863	12th	Gospels	262	Houghton Library, Harvard University, MS Typ. 294 (fol. 1- 262)	Cambridge, MA	USA	INTF
2864	11th-12th	Revelation	35	Houghton Library, Harvard University, MS Typ 294 (fol. 263- 297)	Cambridge, MA	USA	INTF
2865	12th	Acts, General Epistles, Pauline Epistles	219	Houghton Library, Harvard University, MS Typ 491 (fol. 1-219)	Cambridge, MA	USA	HL
2865	12th	Acts, General Epistles, Pauline Epistles	219	Houghton Library, Harvard University, MS Typ 491 (fol. 1-219)	Cambridge, MA	USA	INTF
[2866]=2483							
2867	14th	John 1:1-3:29	8	National Library, Grec 194 A, fol. 2-9	Paris	France	BnF
2868	13th	Gospels	276	Romanian Academy, Ms. Gr. 1543	Bucharest	Romania	
2869	11th	Gospels	234	Vatopedi Monastery, Skevophylakion, 1	Mount Athos	Greece	
2870	11th	Gospels	192	Vatopedi Monastery, Skevophylakion, 2	Mount Athos	Greece	
2871	12th	Gospels	127	Vatopedi Monastery, Skevophylakion, 9	Mount Athos	Greece	
2872	11th-12th	Gospels	234	Vatopedi Monastery, Skevophylakion, 10	Mount Athos	Greece	
2873	1281	Gospels	201	Vatopedi Monastery, Skevophylakion, 11	Mount Athos	Greece	
2874	1306	Gospels, Acts, General Epistles, Pauline Epistles	338	Vatopedi Monastery, Skevophylakion, 13	Mount Athos	Greece	
2875	14th	Gospels,	368	Vatopedi Monastery, Skevophylakion, 14	Mount Athos	Greece	
2876	14th	Gospels	183	Vatopedi Monastery, Skevophylakion, 15	Mount Athos	Greece	
2877	14th	Gospels	390	Vatopedi Monastery, Skevophylakion, 17	Mount Athos	Greece	
2878	12th	Luke^{P}	1	Dunham Bible Museum, Houston Baptist University, 09.19	Houston, TX	USA	CSNTM, INTF
2879	12th	Theophylact Commentary on the Gospels	330	Corpus Christi College, Gr. 30	Oxford	United Kingdom	
2880	13th	Luke^{P}, John^{P}	115	Saint Neophytos Monastery, MS 11	Paphos	Cyprus	
2881	11th/12th	Matthew 25:6–15.15–24	1	Yale University Library, Beinecke MS 522	New Haven	USA	CSNTM, INTF, YUL
2882	10th/11th	Gospel of Luke	46	CSNTM	Plano, TX	USA	CSNTM, INTF
2883=[9^{abs}]	15th	Matthew^{P}	118	Bodleian Library, MS. Lyell 95	Oxford	United Kingdom	
2884=[30^{abs}]	15th	Gospels	403	Cambridge University Library, Kk. 5.35	Cambridge	United Kingdom	INTF
2885=[96^{abs}]	1500	John^{P}	71	Castle Library, Ie 14	Krivoklát	Czech Republic	
2886=[205^{abs}]	15th	New Testament	54	Marciana National Library, Gr. Z. 6 (336)	Venice	Italy	INTF
2887=[1160^{abs}]	1888	Theophylact Commentary on the Gospels	537	St. Panteleimon Monastery, 661	Mount Athos	Greece	INTF
2888=[1909^{abs}]	16th	Romans 7:7 - 9:21	103	Bavarian State Library, Cod.graec. 110	Munich	Germany	INTF
2889=[1929^{abs}]	14th	Theophylact Commentary on the Pauline Epistles†	439	Bavarian State Library, Cod.graec. 455	Munich	Germany	BSB, CSNTM Archived 2017-10-04 at the Wayback Machine, INTF
2890=[1983^{abs}]	13th	Hebrews^{P}	104	Ambrosiana Library, A 241 inf.	Milan	Italy	INTF
2891=[2036^{abs}]	16th	Revelation^{K}	84	Bavarian State Library, Cod.graec. 248	Munich	Germany	INTF
2892	10th	Acts† 7:40-28:31; General Epistles; Romans; 1 Corinthians† 1:24-16:24; 2 Corinthians; Galatians† 1:1-3:5, 4:2-6:18; Ephesians - 1 Thessalonians; 2 Thessalonians 1:1-3:6†; 1 Timothy 1:1-4:8†; Titus† 1:5-3:15; Hebrews	170	The Van Kampen Foundation, VK 908	(Unknown)	USA	CSNTM, INTF
2893	13th	1 Timothy 4:7 - Hebrews 8:8	15	The Van Kampen Foundation, VK 908 fl. 171-185	(Unknown)	USA	CSNTM, INTF
2894	13th	Gospels	312	J. Paul Getty Museum, MS. 65	Malibu, CA	USA	JPGM
2895	17th	Gospels†	288	The Van Kampen Foundation, VK 272	(Unknown)	USA	CSNTM, INTF
2896	11th	Matthew† 6:5-22; Mark	39	The Van Kampen Foundation, VK 862	(Unknown)	USA	CSNTM, INTF
2897	13th	Gospels	220	The Van Kampen Foundation, VK 906	(Unknown)	USA	CSNTM, INTF
2898=[278b]	10th	Matthew† 13:43-17:5	9	National Library, Grec 82, fol. 42-50	Paris	France	BnF, INTF
2899=[858b]	14th	Theophylact Commentary on the Pauline Epistles	250	Vatican Library, Vat.gr.647	Vatican City	Vatican City	INTF
2900	14th	Matthew† 1:17-28:20; Mark; Luke; John	221	Albanian National Archives, ANA 85	Tirana	Albania	CSNTM

[top]

== Minuscules 2901–3017 ==
#	Date	Contents	Pages	Institution and refs.	City, State	Country	Images
2901	13th-14th	Gospels	422	Albanian National Archives, ANA 92	Tirana	Albania	CSNTM, INTF
2902	13th	Gospels	308	Albanian National Archives, ANA 93	Tirana	Albania	CSNTM, INTF
2903	12th-13th	2 Peter †, John's, Jude, Pauline Epistles †	108	Albanian National Archives ANA 98	Tirana	Albania	CSNTM
2904	11th-12th	Luke 6:45–22:56 †	31	Benaki Museum, Fonds Ancien 63	Athens	Greece	CSNTM, INTF
2905	13th	Gospels	244	Benaki Museum, SK 1	Athens	Greece	CSNTM, INTF
2906	12th	Luke, John †	48	Private Property	Nicosia	Cyprus	Frag.
2907	10th	Gospels^{S}†	284	Private Collection		United Kingdom	CSNTM, INTF
2908	14th	Matthew and John Gospel fragments †	4	Albanian National Archives, ANA Fragment 7	Tirana	Albania	CSNTM, INTF
2909	16th	Gospels, Pauline Epistles (Revelation copied from a printed edition)	123	St. Panteleimon Monastery, 15, f.1-38. 222-317	Mount Athos	Greece	INTF
[2910]=2909							
2911	14th	Gospels	259	Union Theological Seminary, 69	New York, NY	USA	DS, CSNTM
2912	14th-15th	Matthew 21:36-28:20; Mark; Luke 1:1-40	86	Albanian National Archives, ANA 76	Tirana	Albania	CSNTM, INTF
2913	14th	Gospels †	4	Albanian National Archives, ANA Fragment 12	Tirana	Albania	CSNTM, INTF
2914	11th	John 14:24-15:12; 16:30-17:18 †	2	Christ's College, Fragment B	Cambridge	UK	CSNTM, INTF
2915	13th	Luke 11:52-12:39	2	Municipal Library, 43	Tyrnavos	Greece	
2916	13th	Gospels	270	Gennadius Library, Gennadius Κ 20	Athens	Greece	CSNTM, INTF
2917	12th	Revelation	26	National Library, Coislin 202 bis (fol. 1-26)	Paris	France	INTF
2918	1273	Acts, Pauline Epistles, Revelation	206	Vatican Library, Borg.gr.18 (fol. 239-444)	Vatican City	Vatican	INTF
2919	14th-15th	Revelation	15	Vatican Library, Reg.gr.179 (fol. 156-169)	Vatican City	Vatican	INTF
2920	15th	Revelation	30	Marciana National Library, Gr. Z. 10 (394), fol. 382-421	Venice	Italy	INTF
2921	15th	Revelation	20	Herzog August Library, Codd. Aug. 16.7.4°, fol. 186-205	Wolfenbüttel	Germany	INTF
2922	13th	Revelation	22	Esphigmenou Monastery, 67, fol. 209-229	Mount Athos	Greece	INTF
2923	14th	Revelation	32	Iviron Monastery, 60, fol. 199-230	Mount Athos	Greece	INTF
2924	12th-13th	Revelation 14:10-15:2†	2	Royal Site of San Lorenzo de El Escorial, T. III. 17, fol. 175.176	San Lorenzo de El Escorial	Spain	INTF
2925	16th	Gospels†	99	Gennadius Library, Gennadius 266	Athens	Greece	CSNTM, INTF
2926	16th	Acts, Pauline Epistles, Revelation†	74	Greek Orthodox Patriarch of Jerusalem, Saba 676, fol. 1-60.251-263	Jerusalem	Israel	LOC, INTF, CSNTM
2927	11th	Gospel of John 4:23-6:7†	4	Vatopedi Monastery, 1211, f. 12-15	Mount Athos	Greece	
[2928]=2860							
2929	10th	Gospels	228	Museum of the Bible, G.C.MS.000139	Washington, DC	USA	CSNTM
2930	1331	Gospels	178	Iviron Monastery, 1405	Mount Athos	Greece	
2931	1643	Revelation 16:21-22:21†	40	National Library, Supplement Grec 475, fol. 1-40	Paris	France	BnF, INTF
2932	10th	John 10:18-31 †	1	Yale University Library, Beinecke MS 1114	New Haven, CT	USA	YUL, CSNTM, INTF
2933	11th?	Luke 1:1-6 †	1	National Library, NLG 118	Athens	Greece	CSNTM
2933	11th?	Luke 1:1-6 †	1	National Library, NLG 118	Athens	Greece	CSNTM
2933	11th?	Luke 1:1-6 †	1	National Library, NLG 118	Athens	Greece	INTF
2934	11th-14th	Acts 3:2-5, 8-11; 1 John 2:29-3:3, 5:11-15, 18-21†	2	National Library, NLG 2676	Athens	Greece	CSNTM
2934	11th-14th	Acts 3:2-5, 8-11; 1 John 2:29-3:3, 5:11-15, 18-21†	2	National Library, NLG 2676	Athens	Greece	INTF
2935	16th	Mark	44	National Library, NLG 2771, 109a - 153a	Athens	Greece	CSNTM, INTF
2936	1228	Theophylact Commentary on Romans 7:15–16:24†; 1 Corinthians 1:1–16:16<†; 2 Corinthians 1:6–13:14†; Galatians - Philippians; Colossians 1:1-4:11†; 1 Thessalonians 1:3-5:28†; 2 Thessalonians - Hebrews	335	National Library, NLG 3139	Athens	Greece	CSNTM, INTF
2937	10th	Gospels	263	Greek Orthodox Patriarchate, 122	Alexandria	Egypt	
2938	10th-11th	John 2:14-24	1	Tufts University, Welch Collection AC.40.17	Waltham, MA	USA	
2939	10th	Gospels†^{s}	199	Herzogin Anna Amalia Library, Q 743	Weimar	Germany	HAAL
2940	11th-12th	Matthew 28:1-20	2	National Library, 4189, fol. 184-185	Athens	Greece	
2941	11th-12th	Matthew 24:38-25:14	2	Berlin State Library, Ms. or. quart. 805, Bl. 1v-2r	Berlin	Germany	
2942	15th	Matthew	260	Yale University Library, Beinecke MS 714 (fol. 15r-121r)	New Haven, CT	USA	YUL, CSNTM
2943	14th	Luke 3-23†; John 1-11†	54	Owner Unknown			Sotheby's
2944	14th	John 1:1-25; 8:34-10:34†	12	Dunham Bible Museum, Houston Baptist University, 2018.56 + 2019.3	Houston, TX	USA	
2945	c. 1100	Gospels	319	Braidense National Library, Ms. Donazione Castiglioni 4	Milan	Italy	
2946	11th	John 13:27-30	1	Owner unknown (sold 6 July 2016)			Dreweatts
2947	12th	Gospels	421	Iviron Monastery, 2107	Mount Athos	Greece	
2948	1323	Gospels	301	Iviron Monastery, 2110	Mount Athos	Greece	
2949	13th	Gospels	260	Iviron Monastery, 2105	Mount Athos	Greece	
2950	12th	Gospels	278	Iviron Monastery, 2113	Mount Athos	Greece	
2951	13th	Gospels	254	Iviron Monastery, 2112	Mount Athos	Greece	
2952	10th	Acts	72	Laurentian Library, Conv. Soppr. 191 (f. 1-71)	Florence	Italy	BML
2953	12th	Matthew 26:59-75	1	Bryn Mawr College, 2012.11.103	Bryn Mawr, PA	USA	BMC
2954	12th	Gospels	293	Museum of Oltenia, MS. 22	Craiova	Romania	MO
2955	16th	Gospels†	79	V.A. Urechia Library, Ms. V/2	Galati	Romania	
2956	12th	Luke 20:17-21	1	Concattedrale di S. Maria Assunta	Gerace	Italy	
2957	c. 1540	Theophylact Commentary on John	214	Duke University, Greek MS 053	Durham, NC	USA	DU
2958	10th/11th	Matthew / John	7	Vatican Library, Vat. gr. 788B, fol. 2r, 6v, 3r (sic)	Vatican City	Vatican City	
2959	11th/12th	1 Peter 4:4-5:4	1	Vernadsky National Library, Ф. V (OTIS), 3620	Kiev	Ukraine	
2960	13th	Pauline Epistles	20	Vernadsky National Library, Φ. 72 (КГр), 4	Kiev	Ukraine	
2961	11th-12th	Theophylact Commentary on 1 and 2 Corinthians	347	Saint Catherine's Monastery, Gr. 308	Sinai	Egypt	LOC
2962	10th	Paul's Epistles	309	Bodleian Library, Auct. T. 1. 7 (Misc. 185)	Oxford	United Kingdom	
2963	1290	Gospels	154	National Library of France, Suppl. Gr. 1259, fol. 1-154	Paris	France	BnF
2964	11th/12th	Matthew, John	187	National Library, Gr. 200	Paris	France	BnF
2965	1360-1380	John (Nicetas Catena)	502	Regional Museum, MIK 6370	Mikulov	Czech Republic	MS
2966	10th/11th	Romans	2	Vernadsky National Library, Φ. I (Лм), 137/1	Kiev	Ukraine	
2967	12th	Gospels	309	Iviron Monastery, (2108)	Mount Athos	Greece	
2968	12th	Gospels	278	Iviron Monastery, (2109)	Mount Athos	Greece	
2969	12th	Gospels	326	Iviron Monastery, (2114)	Mount Athos	Greece	
2970	18th	Revelation 1:1-21:9	52	Evangelistria Monastery, 71	Skiathos	Greece	
2971	14th	Gospels	198	Dikigorikos Syllogos Library, 1	Rethymno	Crete, Greece	
2972							
2973	18th	Gospels	108	Pantokratoros Monastery, 2005	Mount Athos	Greece	MAR
2974	14th-15th	Gospels	285	Protaton Church, 83, fol. 1-285	Mount Athos	Greece	MAR
2975	14th	Matthew (Nicetas Catena)	143	Bodleian Library, Auct. E.2.2, ff. 1–109 and 244–277	Oxford	United Kingdom	
2976	1316	Theophylact Commentary on Luke	15	National Library, Grec 214, fol. 221-235	Paris	France	BnF
2977	14th	Theophylact Commentary on John	183	National Library, Grec 233	Paris	France	BnF
2978	16th	Pauline Epistles, General Epistles	37	Vallicelliana Library, F. 9, fol. 21-52	Rome	Italy	
2979	14th	Theophylact Commentary on John	170	Saint Catherine's Monastery, Gr. 307	Sinai	Egypt	LoC
2980	1552	Gospel of Luke	275	Municipal Library, 13	Perpignan	France	ML
2981	16th	Matthew 5:17-35; 7:3, 6, 7, 9-23	2	Vatican Library, Vat. gr. 2275, ff. 45–46	Vatican City	Vatican City	DVL
2982	17th	Zigabenus Commentary on Matthew 1:1-7, 20-25; 2:7-3:1	9	Vatican Library, Vat. gr. 2275, fol. 155-163	Vatican City	Vatican City	DVL
2983	17th	Theophylact Commentary on John 1:5-7	1	Vatican Library, Vat. gr. 2275, fol. 184	Vatican City	Vatican City	DVL
2984	14th	Theophylact Commentary on Matthew	78	Yale University Library, Beinecke MS 235, fol. 136r-213v	New Haven, CT	United States	YUL
2985	15th	Theophylact Commentary on John	215	Vatican Library, Vat. gr. 1753, fol. 246-461	Vatican City	Vatican City	DVL
2986	14th	Gospel of John 14:19-21:25; 8:3-11	39	University Library, A.III.51	Basel	Switzerland	
2987	12th	Pauline Epistles, General Epistles	268	Royal Site of San Lorenzo de El Escorial, Y. II. 1	San Lorenzo de El Escorial	Spain	RBME
2988	14th/15th	Theophylact Commentary on Matthew	88	National Library of Austria, Theol. gr. 209, fol. 56-143	Vienna	Austria	
2989	13th	Theophylact Commentary on Luke, John	158	National Museum, 76	Ohrid	Macedonia	
2990	11th	Gospel of Luke	38	Angelica Library, Ang. gr. 67, fol. 139-177	Rome	Italy	IC
2991		Revelation	144	National Library of Spain, 4589, fol. 1-144	Madrid	Spain	NLS
2992	14th	Revelation	50	National University Library, Peyron, 12	Turin	Italy	
2993	12th	Matthew (Nicetas Catena)	114	Biblioteca Nazionale Universitaria, B.III.25	Turin	Italy	
2994	11th	Matthew and Luke	55	Dikigorikos Syllogos Library, 2	Rhethymno, Crete	Greece	
2995	14th	Theophylact Commentary on the Gospels	1	Monastery of Korona, 6	Karditsa	Greece	
2996	13th/14th	Acts	8	Ecclesiastical Historical and Archival Institute of the Patriarchate of Bulgaria, EHAI 908, fol. 231-238	Sofia	Bulgaria	
2997	16th	Theophylact Commentary on the Gospels	1	Greek Orthodox Patriarchate, Saba 300	Jerusalem		
2998	14th	Theophylact Commentary on the Gospels	152	Great Meteoron Monastery, 373	Meteora	Greece	
2999	16th	Zigabenus Commentary on the Pauline Epistles	137	Bavarian State Library, Cod. graec. 259	Munich	Germany	BSL
3000	11th/12th	Gospels	275	Herzogin Anna Amalia Library, Oct 452	Weimar	Germany	HAAL
3001	1230	Theophylact Commentary on John	132	Herzogin Anna Amalia Library, Fol. 516	Weimar	Germany	HAAL
3002	14th	Gospels	166	Archbishopric Collection, 65	Nicosia	Cyprus	
3003	10th	Gospel of Mark	3	Library of the Russian Academy of Science, RAIK 15	Saint Petersburg	Russia	
3004	ca. 1775	Revelation	484	National Library of Spain, 4836	Madrid	Spain	NLS
3005	ca. 1775	Revelation	125	National Library of Spain, 4663, fol. 7-132	Madrid	Spain	NLS
3006	1717	Revelation	39	Ecclesiastical Historical and Archival Institute of the Patriarchate of Bulgaria, EHAI 876, fol. 133-174	Sofia	Bulgaria	
3007	10th	Revelation 1:1	2	Laurentian Medicean Library, Pluteo VI.19, fol. 173-174	Florence	Italy	
3008	13th/14th	Luke 1:74-2:14	1	Parrocchia di S. Maria del Gamio e delle Armi, frammento 42	Saracena	Italy	
3008	13th/14th	Luke 2:46-3:9	1	Chiesa Monumentale di San Guliano	Castrovillari	Italy	
3009	14th	Matthew, Mark, and Luke	155	St. John the Theologian Monastery, 304, fol. 162-316	Patmos	Greece	
3010	15th	Matthew 1:12-5:7	7	National Library of Austria, Hist. gr. 88, fol. 245-251	Vienna	Austria	
3011	15th/16th	Luke 1:26-79	3	Communale Augusta Library, G 11, fol. 79-81	Perugia	Italy	
3012	15th	John 1:1-5:6	10	Fitzwilliam Museum, MS CFM 30	Cambridge	United Kingdom	FM
3013							
3014	13th/14th	Gospels	371	Dousikou Monastery, 121	Trikala	Greece	
3015	10th	John 11:57-12:40	2	Bodleian Library, Lincoln College, Ms. Gr. 23	Oxford	United Kingdom	
3016	10th	Gospels	270	German National Library, Klemmsammlung I,101 (Olim Eing. 1973/532)	Leipzig	Germany	
3017	10th/11th	Gospels	242	German National Library, Klemmsammlung I, 102 (Olim Eing. 1973/531)	Leipzig	Germany	

[top]

== Gallery ==
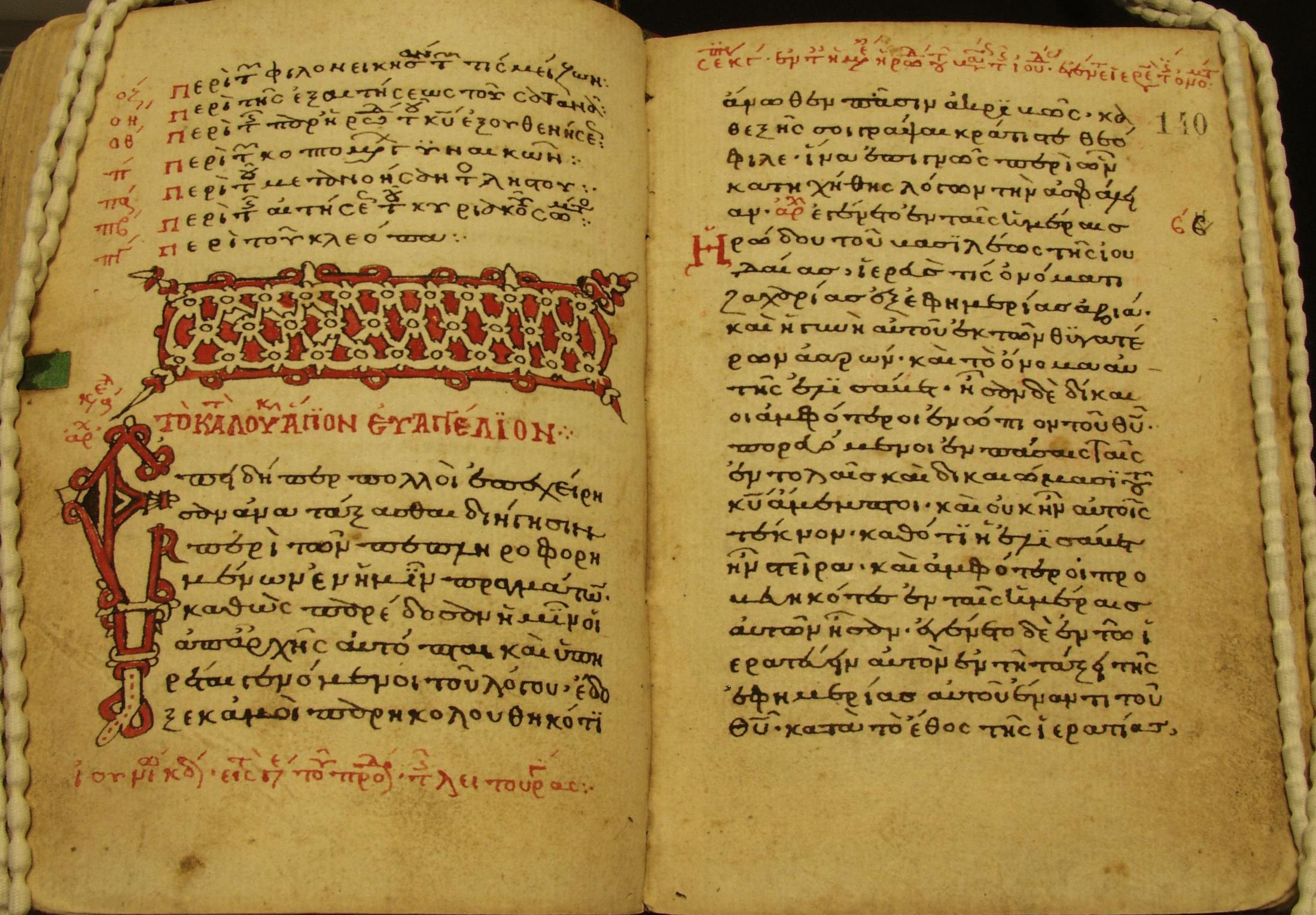
Minuscule 2444

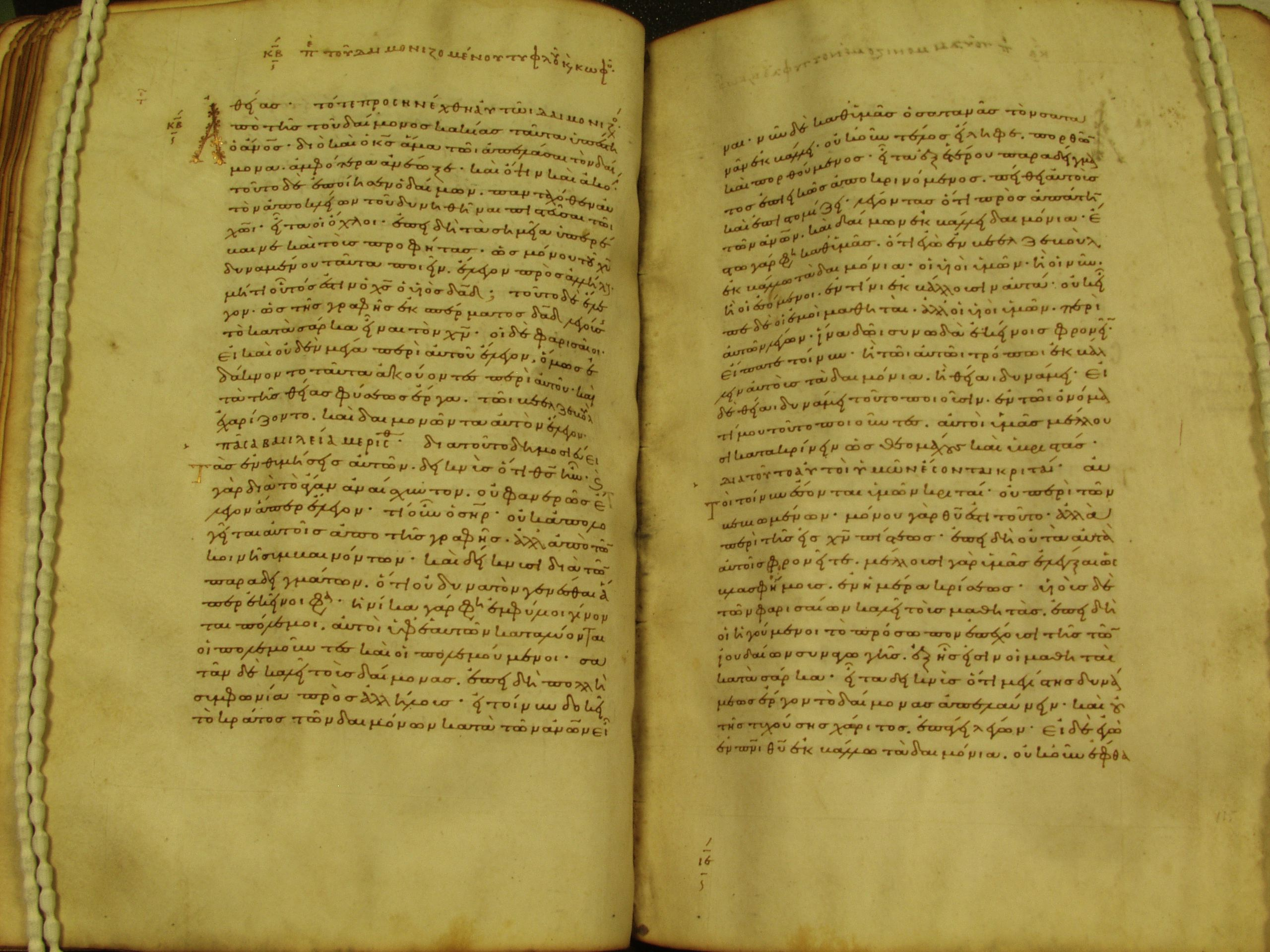
Folio 121 of Minuscule 2755

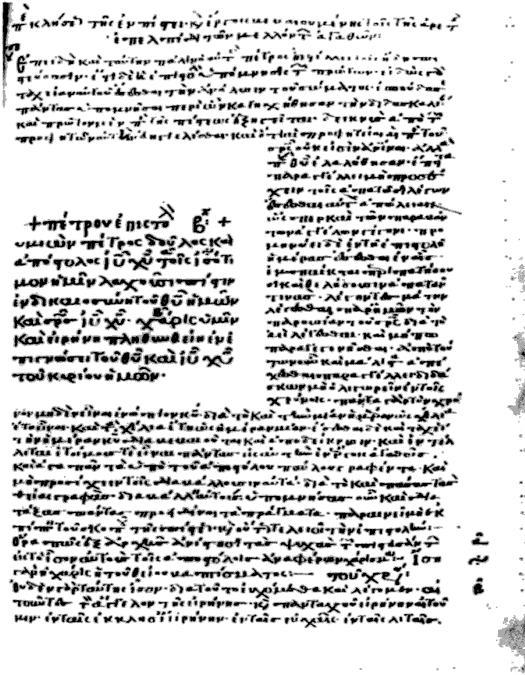
2 Peter 1:1–2 in Minuscule 2818

== See also ==
- List of New Testament papyri
- List of New Testament uncials
- List of New Testament minuscules (1–1000)
- List of New Testament minuscules (1001–2000)
- List of New Testament minuscules ordered by Location/Institution
- List of New Testament lectionaries
- List of New Testament amulets

=== Lists of minuscules (2001–) ===
- List of New Testament minuscules (2001–2100)
- List of New Testament minuscules (2101–2200)
- List of New Testament minuscules (2201–2300)
- List of New Testament minuscules (2301–2400)
- List of New Testament minuscules (2401–2500)
- List of New Testament minuscules (2501–2600)
- List of New Testament minuscules (2601–2700)
- List of New Testament minuscules (2701–2800)
- List of New Testament minuscules (2801–2900)
- List of New Testament minuscules (2901–)
