= Institute for New Testament Textual Research =

Biblical studies organization

Coordinates: 51°57′40″N 7°37′25″E

- Abbreviation: INTF
- Formation: 7 February 1959
- Founder: Kurt Aland
- Location: Münster, Germany
- Director: Holger Strutwolf
- Website: egora.uni-muenster.de/intf/index.shtml

The Institute for New Testament Textual Research (German: Institut für neutestamentliche Textforschung — INTF) at the University of Münster, Westphalia, Germany, is to research the textual history of the New Testament and to reconstruct its Greek initial text on the basis of the entire manuscript tradition, the early translations and patristic citations; furthermore the preparation of an Editio Critica Maior based on the entire tradition of the New Testament in Greek manuscripts, early versions and New Testament quotations in ancient Christian literature. Under Kurt Aland's supervision, the INTF collected almost the entire material that was needed. The manuscript count in 1950 was 4250, in 1983, 5460, and in 2017 approximately 5800 manuscripts.

Moreover, INTF produces several more editions and a variety of tools for New Testament scholarship, including the concise editions known as the "Nestle–Aland" – Novum Testamentum Graece and the UBS Greek New Testament. Many of the results are also available to the wider public at the adjoining Bible Museum, which is affiliated with the institute.

First supplements of the Editio Critica Maior with the Catholic epistles and the Acts of the Apostles have been published since 1997.

== History ==
The INTF was founded in Münster, Germany, in 1959 by Kurt Aland (1915–1994). Since the 1950s Aland had been working on Eberhard and Erwin Nestle's Novum Testamentum Graece. At the INTF the concise scholarly edition saw further revisions and publications, until it became the trademark of the institute under the name of "Nestle-Aland" – Novum Testamentum Graece. In 1966, a second concise edition intended for translators, the Greek New Testament, was published. The great papyri discoveries of the 20th century were of special relevance for a new reconstruction of the text published in both the 26th edition of Nestle–Aland and the third edition of the Greek New Testament. Both editions contain the identical text while differing in their apparatus.

However, the main objective of the Institute was the so-called Editio Critica Maior based on the entire tradition of the New Testament in Greek manuscripts, old translations and New Testament quotations in ancient Christian literature. The prerequisite for the realisation of this task was the sifting and examination of the entire manuscript tradition of the Greek New Testament. Under the supervision of Kurt Aland the INTF first of all collected almost the entire material (partly on extensive manuscript travels), followed by analyses in single editions and specific studies in preparation of the Editio Critia Maior.

Kurt Aland found a friend and patron in Bishop Hermann Kunst. In 1964 the latter established the Hermann Kunst Foundation for the Promotion of New Testament Textual Research which has granted crucial financial support to the Institute ever since.

In 1979, Kurt Aland founded the Bible Museum Münster that presents the work of the institute to the general public.

In 1983, Barbara Aland succeeded her husband as director of the institute. Under her supervision, the analysis of the material that had been started under Kurt Aland continued and was made accessible for research in numerous publications. The first supplement of the Editio Critica Maior with the Epistle of James was finally published in 1997. Barbara Aland led the institute until 2004.

Since October 2004 Holger Strutwolf has been in office as director of the institute and the Bible Museum.

In 2007 the North Rhine-Westphalian Academy of Sciences and Arts accepted the Editio Critica Maior as one of their projects. In the following year the project was established at Münster University as Novum Testamentum Graecum – Editio Critica Maior.

== Profile ==
- History of the textual tradition of the New Testament: it is the task of the Institute for New Testament Textual Research (INTF) to comprehensively document and analyse the history of the textual tradition of the New Testament in its Greek original language.
- List of Greek NT manuscripts: the Institute for New Testament Textual Research operates the international recording list of Greek manuscripts of the New Testament. All newly discovered manuscripts anywhere in the world are being recorded, examined and provided with a short description at the institute.
- Reconstruction of the initial text: the objective is to gain an impression, for the first time based on the entire material available today, of the textual history, and to reconstruct from this the initial text of the New Testament tradition. The result of this work is being published in the Editio Critica Maior.
- Scholarly concise editions and tools: the INTF tries to answer the need for scholarly concise editions based on the current state of research (Nestle–Aland, Greek New Testament, Synopsis) and scholarly reference works (concordances, Bauer–Aland). The concise editions have been continued, but they have also been supplemented by a digital edition and transcripts of important manuscripts on the Internet and a virtual manuscript room to make use of the advantages of that medium. All editions will increasingly benefit from the insights gained in the work on the Editio Critica Maior.
- New Testament Virtual Manuscript Room: the INTF provides an electronic text critical resource, the New Testament Virtual Manuscript Room (NT.VMR), a virtual manuscript reading room, where New Testament manuscripts can be viewed online. Digitized manuscripts can be viewed in the VMR individually in facsimile and as transcript, if available.
- Arbeiten zur neutestamentlichen Textforschung: under this title, the INTF publishes its own series. It mainly contains research results and studies from various INTF projects.
- Bible Museum: INTF's outreach to the broader public through the affiliated Bible Museum and through exhibitions outside the institute.

== Manuscripts ==
The INTF also holds some manuscripts of the New Testament, and took responsibility for registering the New Testament manuscripts (named the Gregory–Aland numbers), and for editing the Novum Testamentum Graece.

Minuscules: 676, 798, 1432, 2444, 2445, 2446, 2460, 2754, 2755, 2756, 2793;

Lectionaries: ℓ1681, ℓ1682, ℓ1683, ℓ1684 (lower script Uncial 0233), ℓ1685, ℓ1686, ℓ2005, ℓ2137, ℓ2208, and ℓ2276.

== See also ==
- Kurt Aland
- Editio Critica Maior
- Biblical manuscripts
- Center for the Study of New Testament Manuscripts

== Bibliography ==
- B. Aland, Neutestamentliche Textforschung, eine philologische, historische und theologische Aufgabe, in: Bilanz und Perspektiven gegenwärtiger Auslegung des Neuen Testaments, hrsg. v. F.W. Horn, Berlin/New York 1995, pp. 7–29.
- B. Aland, K. Wachtel, The Greek Minuscule Manuscripts of the New Testament, in: The Text of the New Testament in Contemporary Research. Essays on the Status Quaestionis, ed. by Bart D. Ehrman and M. W. Holmes, Grand Rapids, 1995, pp. 43–60.
