= List of New Testament minuscules (2401–2500) =

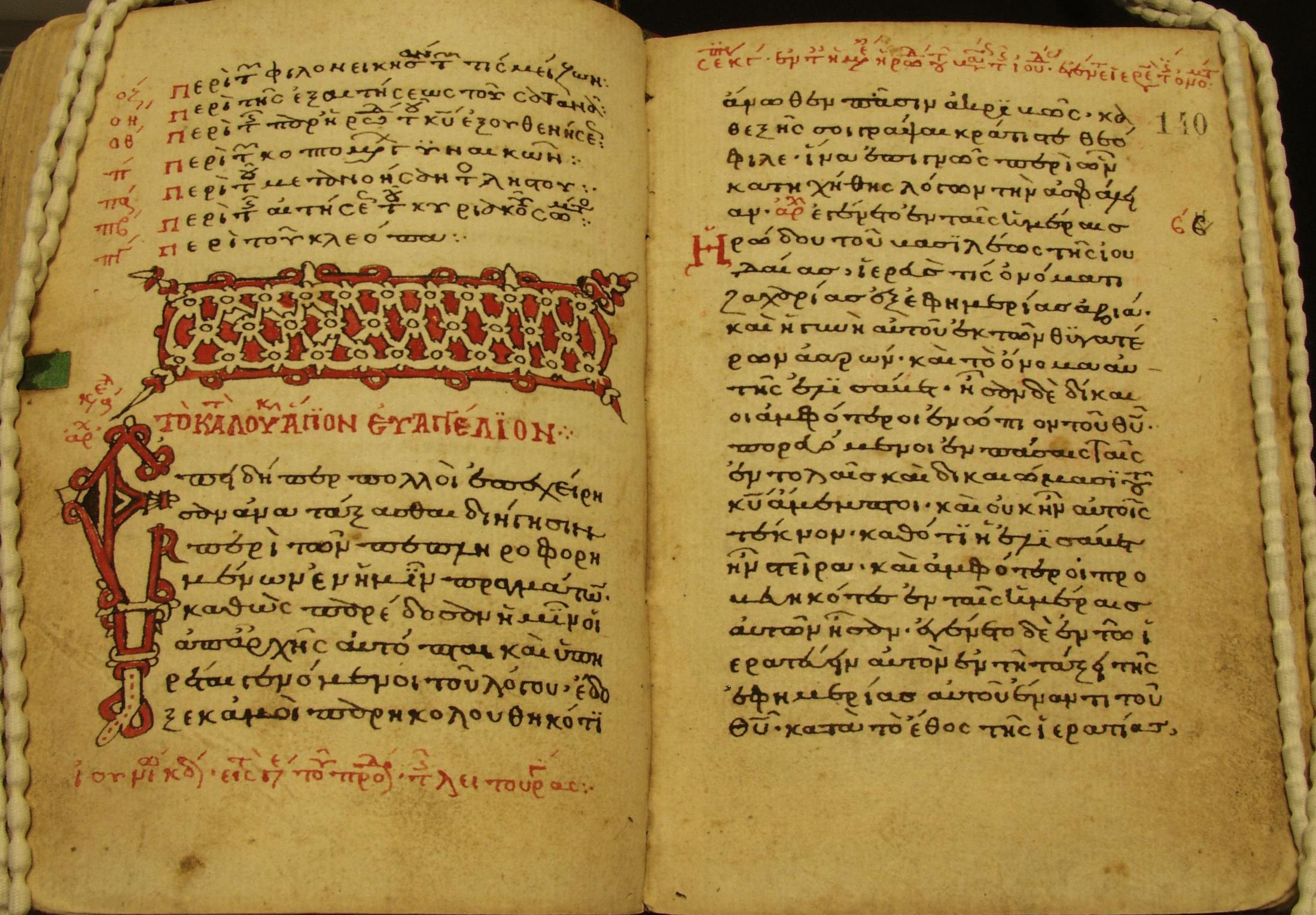
List of the κεφαλαια and the first page of Gospel of John with the decorated headpiece in Minuscule 2444

A New Testament minuscule is a copy of a portion of the New Testament written in a small, cursive Greek script (developed from Uncial).

== Legend ==
- The numbers (#) are the now standard system of Caspar René Gregory, often referred to as the Gregory-Aland numbers.
- Included among the cataloged minuscules are the following types of manuscripts, color coded:

Grey represents continuous text manuscripts containing only New Testament portions
Beige represents manuscripts with New Testament portions and a catena (quotations from church fathers)
Light cyan represents manuscripts of single-author commentaries who included the full Scripture text.
Light red represents manuscripts of single-author commentaries who included both the full Scripture text and a catena.
Light purple represents manuscripts of commentaries where the Scripture text was abridged.
White represents manuscript numbers no longer in use.

- Dates are estimated to the nearest 100 year increment where specific date is unknown.
- Content generally only describes sections of the New Testament: Gospels, The Acts of the Apostles (Acts), Pauline epistles, and so on. Sometimes the surviving portion of a codex is so limited that specific books, chapters or even verses can be indicated. Linked articles, where they exist, generally specify content in detail, by verse.
- Digital images are referenced with direct links to the hosting web pages, with the exception of those at the INTF. The quality and accessibility of the images is as follows:

Gold color indicates high resolution color images available online.
Tan color indicates high resolution color images available locally, not online.
Light tan color indicates only a small fraction of manuscript pages with color images available online.
Light gray color indicates black/white or microfilm images available online.
Light blue color indicates manuscript not imaged, and is currently lost or ownership unknown.
Light pink color indicates manuscript destroyed, presumed destroyed, or deemed too fragile to digitize.
Violet color indicates high resolution ultraviolet images available online.

† Indicates the manuscript has damaged or missing pages.
^{P} Indicates only a portion of the books were included.
^{K} Indicates manuscript also includes a commentary.
^{S} Indicates lost portions of manuscript replaced via supplement of a later hand.
^{abs} (abschrift) Indicates manuscript is copy.
[ ] Brackets around Gregory-Aland number indicate the manuscript belongs to an already numbered manuscript, was found to not be a continuous text manuscript, was found to be written in modern Greek versus Koine Greek, was proved a forgery, or has been destroyed.

== Minuscules 2401–2500 ==
#	Date	Contents	Pages	Institution and refs.	City, State	Country	Images
2401	12th	Acts†, Pauline Epistles†, General Epistles†	2	McGill University	Montreal	Canada	INTF
2401	12th	Acts†, Pauline Epistles†, General Epistles†	152	The University of Chicago Library, Ms. 142 (Goodspeed)	Chicago, IL	USA	TUOCL, INTF
2402	16th	Maximus Peloponnesius and Andreas of Caesarea Commentary on Revelation	194	The University of Chicago Library, Ms. 931 (Goodspeed)	Chicago, IL	USA	TUOCL
2402	16th	Maximus Peloponnesius and Andreas of Caesarea Commentary on Revelation	194	The University of Chicago Library, Ms. 931 (Goodspeed)	Chicago, IL	USA	INTF
2403	16th	Oecumenius Commentary on Revelation† 1:1-2:1; 15:1-22:21	29	National Library, 4592, fol. 111-139	Madrid	Spain	INTF
2404	13th	Gospels, Acts, Pauline Epistles, General Epistles	376	The University of Chicago Library, Ms. 126 (Goodspeed)	Chicago, IL	USA	TUOCL
2404	13th	Gospels, Acts, Pauline Epistles, General Epistles	376	The University of Chicago Library, Ms. 126 (Goodspeed)	Chicago, IL	USA	INTF
2405	13th	Gospels	209	The University of Chicago Library, Ms. 130 (Goodspeed)	Chicago, IL	USA	TUOCL
2406	14th	Gospels†	245	The University of Chicago Library, Ms. 134 (Goodspeed)	Chicago, IL	USA	TUOCL
2407	1332	Gospels†	328	The University of Chicago Library, Ms. 136 (Goodspeed)	Chicago, IL	USA	TUOCL, INTF
2408	14th	Commentary on Revelation† 5:1-5	1	Bodleian Library, MS. Barocci 48, fol. 18	Oxford	United Kingdom	DB
2408	14th	Commentary on Revelation† 5:1-5	1	Bodleian Library, MS. Barocci 48, fol. 18	Oxford	United Kingdom	INTF
2409	13th	Matthew†, Mark†	55	The University of Chicago Library, Ms. 141 (Goodspeed)	Chicago, IL	USA	TUOCL
2409	13th	Matthew†, Mark†	55	The University of Chicago Library, Ms. 141 (Goodspeed)	Chicago, IL	USA	INTF
[2410]=2266							
2411	12th	Gospels†	379	The University of Chicago Library, Ms. 828 (Goodspeed)	Chicago, IL	USA	TUOCL
2411	12th	Gospels†	379	The University of Chicago Library, Ms. 828 (Goodspeed)	Chicago, IL	USA	INTF
2412	12th	Acts†, Pauline Epistles†, General Epistles†	151	The University of Chicago Library, Ms. 922 (Goodspeed)	Chicago, IL	USA	TUOCL
2412	12th	Acts†, Pauline Epistles†, General Epistles†	151	The University of Chicago Library, Ms. 922 (Goodspeed)	Chicago, IL	USA	INTF
[2413]=2268							
2414	10th	Gospels	218	Public Historical Library of Zagora, 1	Zagora	Greece	CSNTM
2414	10th	Gospels	218	Public Historical Library of Zagora, 1	Zagora	Greece	INTF
2415	11th-12th	Gospels†	1	Diocesan Theological College, Ms. A	Montreal	Canada	INTF
2415	11th-12th	Gospels†	210	McGill University, Ms. 2	Montreal	Canada	INTF
[2416]	12th	miniatures	5	Smithsonian Institution, Freer Gallery of Art, 09. 1685-9	Washington, DC	USA	FG
[2417]=2460							
2418	15th	Gospels†	178	Public Historical Library of Zagora, 2	Zagora	Greece	CSNTM
2418	15th	Gospels†	178	Public Historical Library of Zagora, 2	Zagora	Greece	CSNTM (4)
2419	13th-14th	Revelation† 3:1-4:8	4	National Library, Supplement Grec 159, fol. 8-11	Paris	France	BnF, INTF
2420	1296	Gospels	297	Princeton University The Art Museum, 35-70	Princeton, NJ	USA	PUAM
2421	13th	John†	2	The New York Public Library, Rare Books and Manuscripts Division, Ms. 125	New York, NY	USA	CSNTM
2421	13th	John†	2	The New York Public Library, Rare Books and Manuscripts Division, Ms. 125	New York, NY	USA	INTF
2422	16th	Gospels	265	Public Historical Library of Zagora, 2	Zagora	Greece	CSNTM, INTF
2423	13th	Acts†, General Epistles†, Pauline Epistles†	227	Duke University Gk MS 3	Durham, NC	USA	INTF
2424	10th	Hebrews†	4	Skete of Kavsokalyvia, 2	Mount Athos	Greece	INTF
2425	13th	2 Timothy†, Titus†	2	The University of Chicago Library, Ms. 943 (Goodspeed)	Chicago, IL	USA	TUOCL
2425	13th	2 Timothy†, Titus†	2	The University of Chicago Library, Ms. 943 (Goodspeed)	Chicago, IL	USA	INTF
2426	12th	Gospels	326	Lutheran School of Theology at Chicago, Gruber 114	Maywood, IL	USA	CSNTM, INTF
[2427]	19th/20th	Forgery of Byzantine era Gospel of Mark	44	The University of Chicago Library, Ms. 972 (Goodspeed)	Chicago, IL	USA	TUOCL
[2427]	19th/20th	Forgery of Byzantine era Gospel of Mark	44	The University of Chicago Library, Ms. 972 (Goodspeed)	Chicago, IL	USA	INTF
2428	15th	Andreas of Caesarea Commentary on Revelation† 1:1-17:12	69	National Library, Grec 746, fol. 239-307	Paris	France	BnF, INTF
2429	14th	Andreas of Caesarea Commentary on Revelation† 1:1-21:12	49	National Library, Grec 1002, fol. 179-227	Paris	France	BnF, INTF
2430	12th	Gospels†	183	Vatican Library, PIB (Banco A. 1. 6)	Vatican City	Vatican City	INTF
2431	1332	Acts, Pauline Epistles, General Epistles, and Revelation (with marginal scholia)	239	Skete of Kavsokalyvia, 4	Mount Athos	Greece	INTF
2432	14th	Andreas of Caesarea Commentary on Revelation	124	Vatican Library, Ross.766	Vatican City	Vatican City	DVL, INTF
2433	1736	Andreas of Caesarea Commentary on Revelation	136	Public Historical Library of Zagora, 7	Zagora	Greece	CSNTM
2433	1736	Andreas of Caesarea Commentary on Revelation	136	Public Historical Library of Zagora, 7	Zagora	Greece	INTF
2434	13th	Revelation	36	Public Historical Library of Zagora, 12	Zagora	Greece	CSNTM
2434	13th	Revelation	36	Public Historical Library of Zagora, 12	Zagora	Greece	INTF
2435	16th	Andreas of Caesarea Commentary on Revelation†	52	University Library, 2. 749	Salamanca	Spain	
2436	1418	Revelation	28	Vatopedi Monastery, 637, fol. 53-80	Mount Athos	Greece	INTF
2437	11th/12th	Gospels†	220	National Library of Brazil, I. 2	Rio de Janeiro	Brazil	NLB, CSNTM
2437	11th/12th	Gospels†	220	National Library of Brazil, I. 2	Rio de Janeiro	Brazil	INTF
2438	13th	Matthew 4:25-5:22	1	Owner Unknown			
2439	14th	Gospels	286	Archäologisches Museum, 548	Ankara	Turkey	INTF
2440	10th	Luke†	2	Byzantine and Christian Museum, BXM Frag 8; BXM 19926	Athens	Greece	CSNTM
2440	10th	Luke†	2	Byzantine and Christian Museum, BXM Frag 8; BXM 19926	Athens	Greece	INTF
2441	14th	Acts†, Pauline Epistles†	58	Gothenburg University Library, Gr. 3	Gothenburg	Sweden	GUL
2441	14th	Acts†, Pauline Epistles†	58	Gothenburg University Library, Gr. 3	Gothenburg	Sweden	INTF
2442	11th	Gospels†	170	Academy of Athens, Siderides 1	Athens	Greece	INTF
[2443]=2121							
2444	13th	Gospels †	309	Bible Museum, Ms. 4	Münster	Germany	CSNTM, INTF
2445	12th	Mark†, Luke†, John†	116	Bible Museum, Ms. 5	Münster	Germany	CSNTM, INTF
2446	12th	Gospels	320	Bible Museum, Ms. 6	Münster	Germany	CSNTM, INTF
[2447]=798							
2448	12th	Acts†, Pauline Epistles†, General Epistles†	243	Owner unknown, formerly Athens, Mus. Loverdu, Nr. 125			
[2449]	17th	Revelation in modern Greek	29	National Historical Museum, Hist. Eth. Ges. 71	Athens	Greece	CSNTM, INTF
[2450]	18th	Gospels in modern Greek	47	National Historical Museum, Hist. Eth. Ges. 112	Athens	Greece	CSNTM, INTF
2451	11th	Gospels†	145	National Historical Museum, 255	Athens	Greece	CSNTM, INTF
2452	15th	Theophylact Commentary on the Gospels	383	Skete of Saint Anne, 51	Mount Athos	Greece	INTF
2453	11th	Gospels†	264	Vatopedi Monastery, 662	Mount Athos	Greece	INTF
2454	14th	Gospels	239	Vatopedi Monastery, 894	Mount Athos	Greece	INTF
2455	15th	Gospels†	182	Vatopedi Monastery, 895	Mount Athos	Greece	INTF
2456	17th	Gospels†	143	Dionysiou Monastery, 668	Mount Athos	Greece	INTF
2457	13th	Gospels†	64	Dionysiou Monastery, 590	Mount Athos	Greece	INTF
2458	11th	Gospels	285	Dionysiou Monastery, 588	Mount Athos	Greece	INTF
2459	12th	Theophylact Commentary on the Gospels†	223	Archaeological Museum of Almyros, 2	Almyros	Greece	INTF
2460=[2417]	12th	Gospels†	8	Bible Museum, Ms. 19	Münster	Germany	INTF
2460=[2417]	12th	Gospels†	8	Bible Museum, Ms. 19	Münster	Germany	CSNTM
2460=[2417]	12th	Gospels†	2	Columbia University, Rare Book and Manuscript Library, Plimpton Ms. 12	New York	USA	CSNTM
2460=[2417]	12th	Gospels†	195	Zosimaia School, 2	Ioannina	Greece	INTF
[2461]=ℓ2154							
2462	14th-15th	Mark†, Luke†, John†	123	Ecclesiastical Historical and Archival Institute of the Patriarchate of Bulgaria, 19 (475)	Sofia	Bulgaria	INTF
2463	14th	Gospels †	210	Ecclesiastical Historical and Archival Institute of the Patriarchate of Bulgaria, 20 (421)	Sofia	Bulgaria	INTF
2464	9th	Acts† 19:35-28:31; James-2 John; 3 John 1-4†; Romans 1:1-11:28, 16:11-16:27; 1 Corinthians - 2 Thessalonians, Hebrews 1:1-10:19†	212	Monastery of Saint John the Theologian, Ms. 742	Patmos	Greece	CSNTM
2464	9th	Acts† 19:35-28:31; James-2 John; 3 John 1-4†; Romans 1:1-11:28, 16:11-16:27; 1 Corinthians - 2 Thessalonians, Hebrews 1:1-10:19†	212	Monastery of Saint John the Theologian, Ms. 742	Patmos	Greece	INTF
2465	13th	Gospels	180	Monastery of Saint John the Theologian, Ms. 745	Patmos	Greece	INTF
2466	1339	Gospels, Acts, General Epistles, Pauline Epistles	293	Monastery of Saint John the Theologian, Ms. 759	Patmos	Greece	INTF
2467	1421	Gospels†	300	Monastery of Saint John the Theologian, Ms. 775	Patmos	Greece	INTF
2468	11th	Mark†, Luke†	24	Monastery of Saint John the Theologian, Ms. 777	Patmos	Greece	INTF
2469	1569	Gospels	308	Library of the Archbishop of Cyprus, 11	Nicosia	Cyprus	
2470	12th	Theophylact Commentary on the Gospels	626	Ecumenical Patriarchate, Kamariotissis 23	Istanbul	Turkey	CSNTM
2470	12th	Theophylact Commentary on the Gospels	626	Ecumenical Patriarchate, Kamariotissis 23	Istanbul	Turkey	INTF
2471	13th	Gospels	249	Library of the Serail, 119	Istanbul	Turkey	INTF
2472	12th	Gospels†	289	Museum of Religious Art, 1/12608	Bucharest	Romania	INTF
2473	1634	Acts, General Epistles	314	National Library, Taphu 545	Athens	Greece	INTF
2474	11th	Gospels†	265	The University of Chicago Library, Ms. 1054 (Goodspeed)	Chicago, IL	USA	TUOCL
2474	11th	Gospels†	265	The University of Chicago Library, Ms. 1054 (Goodspeed)	Chicago, IL	USA	INTF
2475	11th	Gospels, Acts, General Epistles, Pauline Epistles	314	Church of the Holy Sepulchre, Skevophylakion	Jerusalem		INTF
2476	14th	Gospels	257	Romanian Academy, Ms. Gr. 932	Bucharest	Romania	INTF
2477	17th	Gospels†	230	Romanian Academy, Ms. Gr. 933	Bucharest	Romania	INTF
2478	12th-13th	Gospels	224	The Princes Czartoryski Library, 1870	Kraków	Poland	Palona
2479	13th	Gospels†	198	Municipal Library, 2 Qq C 233	Palermo	Italy	INTF
2480	16th	John†	92	Vatican Library, Vat.gr.2348	Vatican City	Vatican City	INTF
2481	16th	Mark†	84	Vatican Library, Vat.gr.2350	Vatican City	Vatican City	INTF
2482	14th	Theophylact Commentary on the Gospels, Pauline Epistles	293	Municipal Library dell'Archiginnasio, A. 3	Bologna	Italy	INTF
2483=[2866]	13th	Gospels, Acts, Pauline Epistles, General Epistles	8	Owner Unknown			INTF
2483=[2866]	13th	Gospels, Acts, Pauline Epistles, General Epistles	340	Benjamin L. Crawford Collection,	Birmingham	Alabama	
2483=[2866]	13th	Gospels, Acts, Pauline Epistles, General Epistles	340	Benjamin L. Crawford Collection,	Birmingham	Alabama	INTF
2484	1312	Acts†, Pauline Epistles†, General Epistles†	269	British Library, Add MS 38538	London	United Kingdom	BL
2485	11th-12th	Gospel of Luke †	2	British Library, Add MS 41180, fol. 92-93	London	United Kingdom	BL
2486	15th-16th	Mark 1:1-1:45 †	2	Bodleian Library, MS. Auct. F. 6. 1, fol. 279-280	Oxford	United Kingdom	INTF
2487	11th	Gospels †	219	Bodleian Library, MS. Lyell 91	Oxford	United Kingdom	INTF
2488	16th	Matthew†, Mark†, Luke†, Acts†	181	Cambridge University Library, Add. Mss. 4173	Cambridge	United Kingdom	INTF
2489	11th	Gospels †	>1	Cambridge University Library, Add. Ms. 4541	Cambridge	United Kingdom	CSNTM
2489	11th	Gospels †	>1	Cambridge University Library, Add. Ms. 4541	Cambridge	United Kingdom	INTF
2490	12th-13th	Theophylact Commentary on Matthew†, John†,	304	Berlin State Library, Graec. qu. 77	Berlin	Germany	INTF
2491=[2850], [2617]	13th	Matthew 19-23†, Mark 1:14-5:33; 9:14-end†, Luke 1:1-11:46†	36	Berlin State Library, Graec. qu. 90	Berlin	Germany	INTF
2491=[2850], [2617]	13th	Matthew 19-23†, Mark 1:14-5:33; 9:14-end†, Luke 1:1-11:46†	24	Burgerbibliothek of Bern, Cod. 784	Bern	Switzerland	INTF
2491=[2850], [2617]	13th	Matthew 19-23†, Mark 1:14-5:33; 9:14-end†, Luke 1:1-11:46†	1	Duke University Library, Gk MS 22	Durham, NC	North Carolina	DU
2491=[2850], [2617]	13th	Matthew 19-23†, Mark 1:14-5:33; 9:14-end†, Luke 1:1-11:46†	1	Rare Book and Manuscript Library, Med/Ren Frag. 49	New York, NY	USA	CSNTM
2491=[2850], [2617]	13th	Matthew 19-23†, Mark 1:14-5:33; 9:14-end†, Luke 1:1-11:46†	1	Rick Imlay	Billings, MT	USA	INTF
2491=[2850], [2617]	13th	Matthew 19-23†, Mark 1:14-5:33; 9:14-end†, Luke 1:1-11:46†	8	Princeton University Library, Ms. 63	Princeton, NJ	USA	INTF
2492	14th	Gospels, Acts, Pauline Epistles, General Epistles	178	Saint Catherine's Monastery, Gr. 1342, fol. 1-178	Sinai	Egypt	LOC, INTF, CSNTM
2493	14th	Revelation†	15	Saint Catherine's Monastery, Gr. 1692, fol. 122-136	Sinai	Egypt	LOC, INTF, CSNTM
2494	1316	New Testament	315	Saint Catherine's Monastery, Gr. 1991	Sinai	Egypt	LOC, INTF, CSNTM
2495	15th	New Testament (Matthew† 10:21-28:20)	222	Saint Catherine's Monastery, Gr. 1992	Sinai	Egypt	LOC, INTF, CSNTM
2496	16th	Gospels	336	Saint Catherine's Monastery, Gr. 1993	Sinai	Egypt	LOC, CSNTM
2497	17th	Gospels	196	Saint Catherine's Monastery, Gr. 1994	Sinai	Egypt	LOC, INTF, CSNTM
2498	1622	Gospels	?	Saint Catherine's Monastery, Gr. 1995	Sinai	Egypt	
2499	13th-14th	Gospels	204	Saint Catherine's Monastery, Gr. 2038	Sinai	Egypt	LOC, INTF, CSNTM
2500	891	Gospels†	206	Library of the Russian Academy of Sciences, K'pel 74	Saint Petersburg	Russia	INTF

[top]

== See also ==
- List of New Testament papyri
- List of New Testament uncials
- List of New Testament minuscules (1–1000)
- List of New Testament minuscules (1001–2000)
- List of New Testament minuscules (2001–)
- List of New Testament minuscules ordered by Location/Institution
- List of New Testament lectionaries

== Bibliography ==
- Aland, Kurt; M. Welte; B. Köster; K. Junack (1994). Kurzgefasste Liste der griechischen Handschriften des Neues Testaments. Berlin, New York: Walter de Gruyter. p. 95. ISBN 3-11-011986-2.
- "Liste Handschriften". Münster: Institute for New Testament Textual Research.
