= List of New Testament minuscules (2701–2800) =

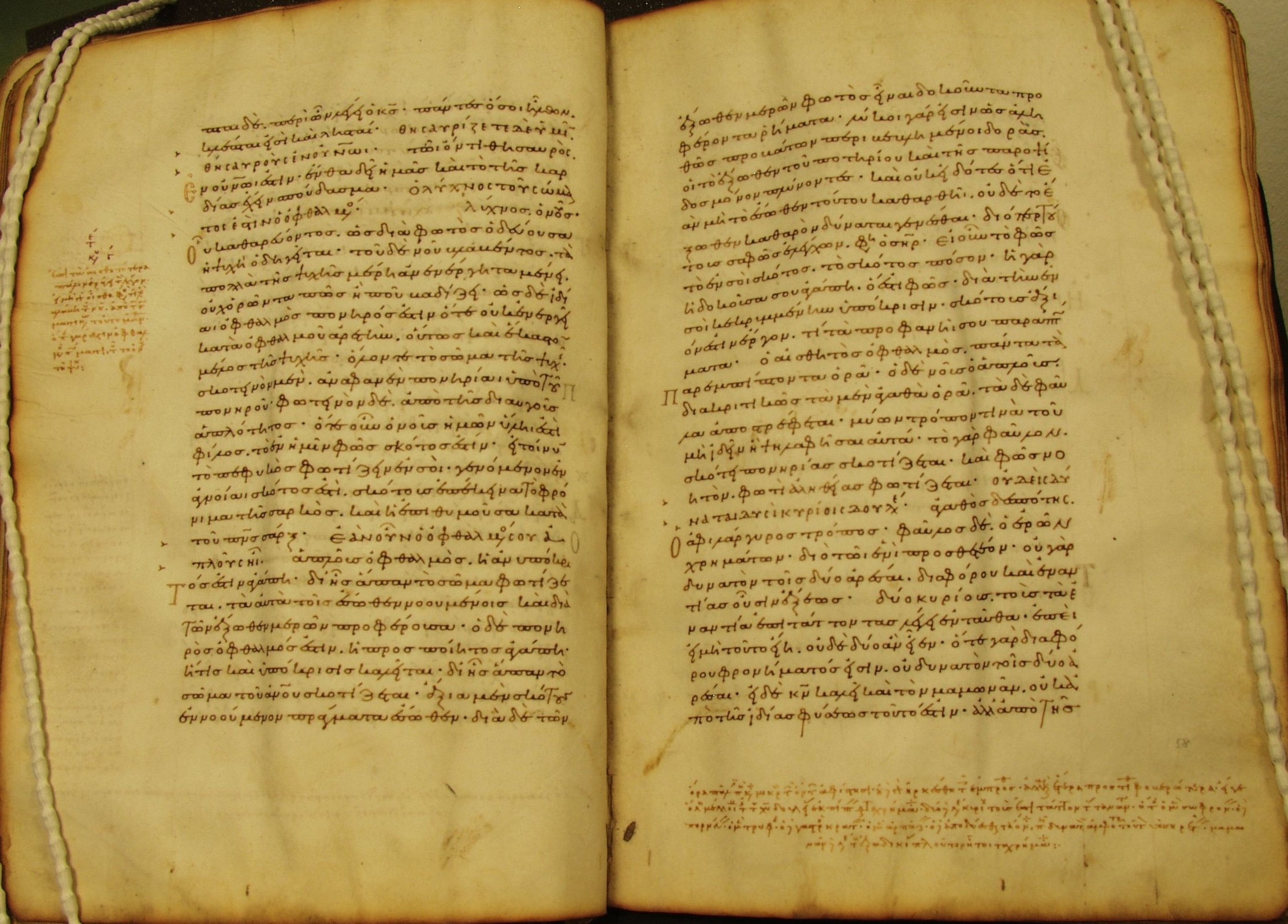
Folio 64 of Minuscule 2755

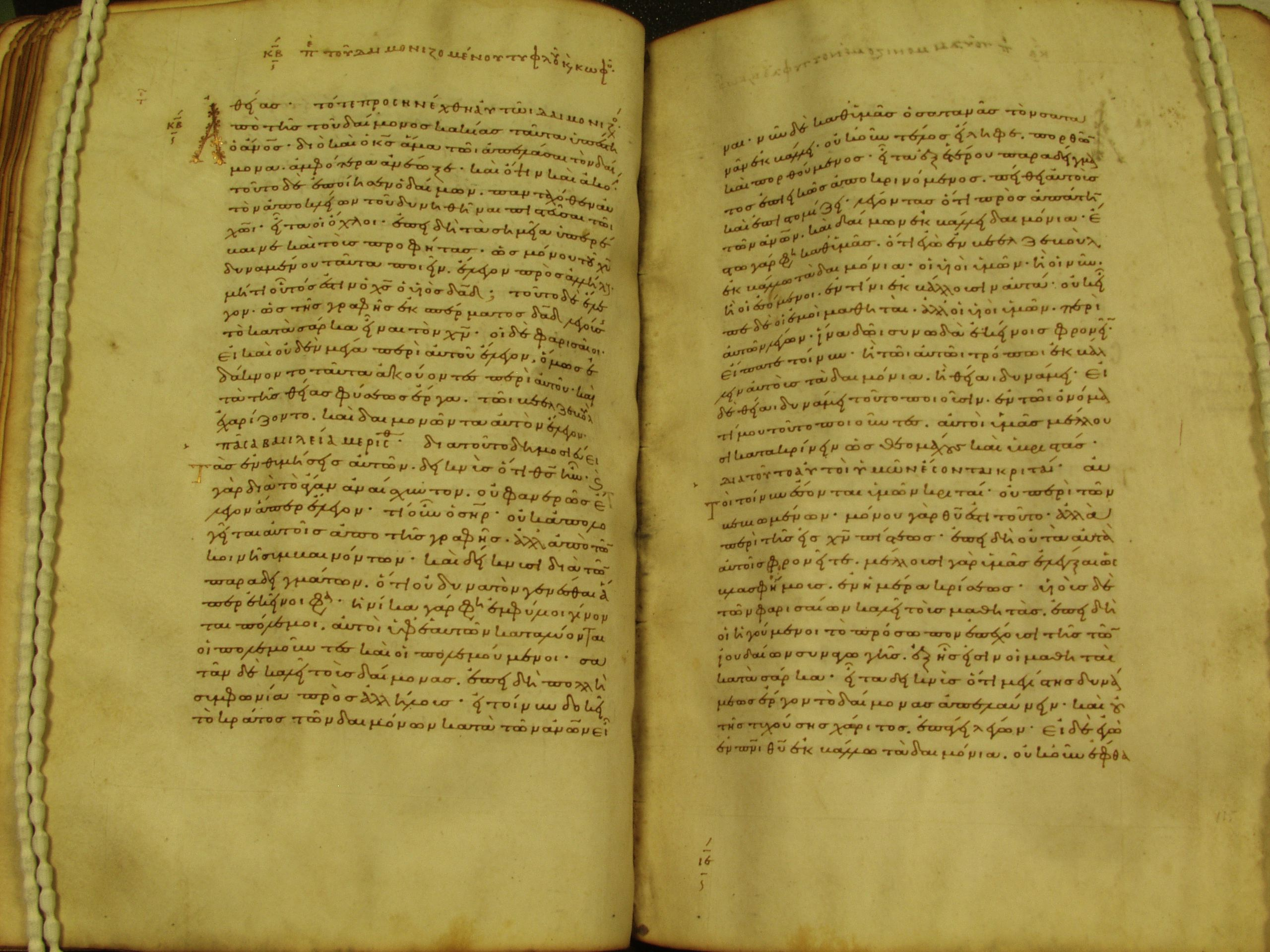
Folio 121 of Minuscule 2755

A New Testament minuscule is a copy of a portion of the New Testament written in a small, cursive Greek script (developed from Uncial).

== Legend ==
- The numbers (#) are the now standard system of Caspar René Gregory, often referred to as the Gregory-Aland numbers.
- Included among the cataloged minuscules are the following types of manuscripts, color coded:

Grey represents continuous text manuscripts containing only New Testament portions
Beige represents manuscripts with New Testament portions and a catena (quotations from church fathers)
Light cyan represents manuscripts of single-author commentaries who included the full Scripture text.
Light red represents manuscripts of single-author commentaries who included both the full Scripture text and a catena.
Light purple represents manuscripts of commentaries where the Scripture text was abridged.
White represents manuscript numbers no longer in use.

- Dates are estimated to the nearest 100 year increment where specific date is unknown.
- Content generally only describes sections of the New Testament: Gospels, The Acts of the Apostles (Acts), Pauline epistles, and so on. Sometimes the surviving portion of a codex is so limited that specific books, chapters or even verses can be indicated. Linked articles, where they exist, generally specify content in detail, by verse.
- Digital images are referenced with direct links to the hosting web pages, with the exception of those at the INTF. The quality and accessibility of the images is as follows:

Gold color indicates high resolution color images available online.
Tan color indicates high resolution color images available locally, not online.
Light tan color indicates only a small fraction of manuscript pages with color images available online.
Light gray color indicates black/white or microfilm images available online.
Light blue color indicates manuscript not imaged, and is currently lost or ownership unknown.
Light pink color indicates manuscript destroyed, presumed destroyed, or deemed too fragile to digitize.
Violet color indicates high resolution ultraviolet images available online.

† Indicates the manuscript has damaged or missing pages.
^{P} Indicates only a portion of the books were included.
^{K} Indicates manuscript also includes a commentary.
^{S} Indicates lost portions of manuscript replaced via supplement of a later hand.
^{abs} (abschrift) Indicates manuscript is copy.
[ ] Brackets around Gregory-Aland number indicate the manuscript belongs to an already numbered manuscript, was found to not be a continuous text manuscript, was found to be written in modern Greek versus Koine Greek, was proved a forgery, or has been destroyed.

== Minuscules 2701–2800 ==
#	Date	Contents	Pages	Institution and refs.	City, State	Country	Images
2701	14th	Gospels†	393	Great Meteoron Monastery, 539	Meteora	Greece	INTF
2702	12th	Gospels	284	Great Meteoron Monastery, 540	Meteora	Greece	INTF
2703	15th	Gospels	215	Great Meteoron Monastery, 541	Meteora	Greece	INTF
2704	15th	Acts, Pauline Epistles, General Epistles	307	Great Meteoron Monastery, 542	Meteora	Greece	INTF
2705	14th	Gospels, Acts, Pauline Epistles, General Epistles	260	Great Meteoron Monastery, 543	Meteora	Greece	INTF
2706	15th	Gospels	185	Great Meteoron Monastery, 544	Meteora	Greece	INTF
2707	13th	Gospels	328	Great Meteoron Monastery, 545	Meteora	Greece	INTF
2708	16th	Gospels	360	Great Meteoron Monastery, 574	Meteora	Greece	INTF
2709	1377	Gospels	172	Great Meteoron Monastery, 580	Meteora	Greece	INTF
2710	14th	Gospels	229	Great Meteoron Monastery, 582	Meteora	Greece	
2711	16th	Luke†, John†	183	Great Meteoron Monastery, 590	Meteora	Greece	INTF
2712	12th	Acts†, General Epistles†, Pauline Epistles†	258	Monastery of St. Stephen, 4	Meteora	Greece	INTF
2713	14th	Gospels	365	Monastery of St. Stephen, 11	Meteora	Greece	INTF
2714	16th	Gospels	312	Monastery of St. Stephen, 12	Meteora	Greece	INTF
2715	16th	Gospels	174	Monastery of St. Stephen, 39	Meteora	Greece	
2716	14th	Acts†, General Epistles†, Pauline Epistles†, Revelation†	197	Monastery of St. Stephen, Triados 25	Meteora	Greece	INTF
2717	13th	John†	8	Monastery of St. Stephen, Triados 118	Meteora	Greece	INTF
2718	12th	Gospels †, Acts†, General Epistles†, Pauline Epistles†	286	Lindos Panagias, 4, fol. 1-166.175-244	Rhodes	Greece	INTF
2719	13th	Gospels	239	Lindos Panagias, 6	Rhodes	Greece	INTF
2720	12th	Theophylact Commentary on Luke, John†,	24	A. Brontis	Athens	Greece	INTF
2721	16th	Gospels	258	High School, 392	Sopoto	Greece	
2722	10th	Gospels †	264	Municipal Library, 13	Tyrnavos	Greece	INTF
[2723]=2382							
2724	13th	Gospels	313	Zavorda Monastery of St. Nikanor, 7	Grevena	Greece	INTF
2725	12th	Gospels †	163	Zavorda Monastery of St. Nikanor, 17	Grevena	Greece	INTF
2726	13th	Gospels	194	Zavorda Monastery of St. Nikanor, 18	Grevena	Greece	INTF
2727	12th	Gospels	239	Zavorda Monastery of St. Nikanor, 27	Grevena	Greece	INTF
2728	15th	Gospels	453	Zavorda Monastery of St. Nikanor, 30	Grevena	Greece	INTF
2729	15th	Gospels †	152	Zavorda Monastery of St. Nikanor, 62, fol. 20-171	Grevena	Greece	INTF
2730	14th	Gospels	275	Zavorda Monastery of St. Nikanor, 63	Grevena	Greece	INTF
2731	14th	Acts, General Epistles, Pauline Epistles	261	Zavorda Monastery of St. Nikanor, 80	Grevena	Greece	INTF
2732	1294	Gospels	336	Zavorda Monastery of St. Nikanor, 90	Grevena	Greece	INTF
2733	1227	Acts†, General Epistles†, Pauline Epistles (lacks 1 Corinthians, 1 Thessalonians)†	252	Zavorda Monastery of St. Nikanor, 99	Grevena	Greece	INTF
2734	1397	Gospels	227	Zavorda Monastery of St. Nikanor, 102	Grevena	Greece	INTF
2735	13th	Theophylact Commentary on the Gospels	404	Zavorda Monastery of St. Nikanor, 109	Grevena	Greece	INTF
2736	15th	General Epistles†, Pauline Epistles†	290	Zavorda Monastery of St. Nikanor, 125	Grevena	Greece	INTF
2737	1559	Gospels, Acts^{P}	123	Vatican Library, Arch.Cap.S.Pietro.D.157	Vatican City	Vatican City	DVL
2737	1559	Gospels, Acts^{P}	123	Vatican Library, Arch.Cap.S.Pietro.D.157	Vatican City	Vatican City	INTF
2738	12th	Theophylact Commentary on Mark	84	Vatican Apostolic Library, Vat.gr.642, fol. 97-180	Vatican City	Vatican City	DVL, INTF
2739	14th	Zigabenus Commentary on the Pauline Epistles†	309	Vatican Library, Vat.gr.1501	Vatican City	Vatican City	INTF
2740	15th	Matthew	1	Vatican Library, Vat.gr.1571, fol. 72	Vatican City	Vatican City	DVL, INTF
2741	11th	1 Peter† 4:17-5:7	1	Vatican Library, Vat.lat.125, fol. II	Vatican City	Vatican City	DVL
2742	11th	Matthew^{P}	2	Vatican Library, Barb.gr.418, fol. 9.15	Vatican City	Vatican City	INTF
2743	16th	Revelation† 1:1-6:10	27	Vatican Library, Reg. gr. 46, fol. 131-157	Vatican City	Vatican City	INTF, DVL
2744	12th	Mark^{P} 10:25-35	1	C.W. Adam, Inv. Nr. 2550	Goslar	Germany	INTF
2745	12th	Gospels†	1	Archaeological Institute of the University of Cologne, Inv. Nr. 523	Cologne	Germany	INTF
2745	12th	Gospels†	308	Metropolis Library	Larnaca	Cyprus	INTF
2746	11th	Acts†, General Epistles†, Pauline Epistles†	244	Royal Library of Belgium, IV. 303	Brussels	Belgium	INTF
2747	15th	Gospels	238	St.St. Cyril and Methodius National Library, Gr. 14	Sofia	Bulgaria	INTF
2748	12th-13th	Gospels †	127	St.St. Cyril and Methodius National Library, Gr. 7	Sofia	Bulgaria	INTF
2749	12th	Gospels	240	Russian Academy of Sciences Branch St. Petersburg, Hist. Inst. 10/667	Saint Petersburg	Russia	INTF
2750	13th	Mark†, Luke†, John†	101	Ecumenical Patriarchate, ehem. Chalki, Theol. Schule, 189	Istanbul	Turkey	INTF
2751	13th	Matthew† 27:23-27:38, 28:4-28:20; Luke† 7:47-24:53; John† 1:1-17:26	94	The University of Chicago Library, Ms. 902 (Goodspeed)	Chicago, IL	USA	TUOCL
2752	11th-12th	Gospels†	108	Gordon College Library, Gr. Ms. 1	Wenham, MA	USA	INTF
2753	13th	Matthew	6	Gordon College Library, Gr. Ms. 1	Wenham, MA	USA	INTF
2754	11th	Gospels†	256	Bible Museum, Ms. 8	Münster	Germany	CSNTM, INTF
2755	11th	Matthew and Mark†	370	Bible Museum, Ms. 9	Münster	Germany	CSNTM, INTF
2756	13th	Gospels	195	Bible Museum, Ms. 10	Münster	Germany	CSNTM, INTF
2757	13th	Gospels	272	Duke University, Gk MS 38	Durham	USA	DU
2757	13th	Gospels	272	Duke University, Gk MS 38	Durham	USA	INTF
2758	1311	Gospels †	290	Monastery of Saint John the Theologian, 891	Patmos	Greece	CSNTM
2758	1311	Gospels †	290	Monastery of Saint John the Theologian, 891	Patmos	Greece	INTF
2759	16th	Revelation	85	Vatican Apostolic Library, Arch.Cap.S.Pietro.C.151, fol. 21-105	Vatican City	Vatican City	INTF
2760	12th	Gospels	260	Romanian Academy, Ms. Gr. 1175	Bucharest	Romania	INTF
2761	13th	Mark^{P}, Luke^{P}, John^{P}	13	Romanian Academy, Ms. Gr. 934	Bucharest	Romania	INTF
2762	12th	John^{P}	1	Library and Information Centre of the Hungarian Academy of Sciences, K 490 (Moravcsik 03)	Budapest	Hungary	INTF
[2763]=1304							
[2764]=2936							
2765	14th	Gospels	300	Bodleian Library, MS. Canon. Gr. 38	Oxford	United Kingdom	INTF
2765	14th	Gospels	300	Bodleian Library, MS. Canon. Gr. 38	Oxford	United Kingdom	DB
2766	13th	Gospels	147	Duke University, Gk MS 31	Durham	USA	DU
2766	13th	Gospels	147	Duke University, Gk MS 31	Durham	USA	INTF
2767	13th-14th	Gospels	289	Mus. de arta relig., 32/69081	Bucharest	Romania	INTF
2768	978	John	128	Bavarian State Library, Gr. 208	Munich	Germany	INTF, BSB
2769	11th-12th	Matthew^{P}	4	Vatican Library, Vat.gr.1853, fol. 96-99	Vatican City	Vatican City	DVL
2769	11th-12th	Matthew^{P}	4	Vatican Library, Vat.gr.1853, fol. 96-99	Vatican City	Vatican City	INTF
2770	16th	Matthew	21	Vatican Library, Vat.gr.1909, fol. 120-140	Vatican City	Vatican City	DVL, INTF
2771	13th	Gospels	272	Lambeth Palace, MS2795	London	United Kingdom	LP
2772	13th	Acts^{P}†, General Epistles^{P}†, Pauline Epistles^{P}†	139	Ecclesiastical Historical and Archival Institute of the Patriarchate of Bulgaria, 24 (236)	Sofia	Bulgaria	INTF
2773	14th	Gospels †	163	Ecclesiastical Historical and Archival Institute of the Patriarchate of Bulgaria, 18 (342)	Sofia	Bulgaria	INTF
2774	13th-14th	Gospels, Acts, General Epistles, Pauline Epistles	349	Ecclesiastical Historical and Archival Institute of the Patriarchate of Bulgaria, 18 (342)	Sofia	Bulgaria	INTF
2775	14th	Gospels †	261	Ecclesiastical Historical and Archival Institute of the Patriarchate of Bulgaria, 22 (905)	Sofia	Bulgaria	INTF
2776	17th	Acts, General Epistles, Pauline Epistles, Revelation	250	Holy Synod of the Church of Greece	Athens	Greece	INTF
2777	14th	Acts†, General Epistles†, Pauline Epistles†	217	Koronis Monastery, 34	Karditsa	Greece	INTF
2778	12th	Acts^{P}	9	Koronis Monastery	Karditsa	Greece	INTF
2779	15th	Gospels†	349	Historical Museum of Crete	Heraklion, Crete	Greece	INTF
2780	14th	Gospels†	288	Panagias	Vonitsa	Greece	INTF
2781	12th	Gospels†	199	Metropolis Library	Pyrgos, Elis	Greece	INTF
2782	11th	Gospels†	176	Library of the Metropolis of Samos, 16, 171 fol.; 81, 5 fol.	Samos	Greece	INTF
2783	14th	Gospels†	316	Library of the Metropolis of Samos, 23	Samos	Greece	
2784	11th-12th	Matthew^{P}, Mark^{P}	36	Library of the Metropolis of Samos, 26	Samos	Greece	INTF
2785	12th	Mark^{P}, Luke^{P}	40	Library of the Metropolis of Samos, 27	Samos	Greece	INTF
2786	14th	Gospels	226	Prophet Elijah Monastery, 28	Santorini	Greece	INTF
2787	12th	Gospels†	306	Museum of the Holy Monastery of Kykkos (Formerly: Church of St. Luke)	Kykkos	Cyprus	INTF
2788	13th	Gospels†	181	Metropolis Library, fol. 70-250	Kyrenia	Cyprus	INTF
2789	10th	John^{P}	1	Metropolis Library	Kyrenia	Cyprus	INTF
2790	10th-11th	Gospels†	227	S. M. Logidou (Private Collection)	Kaimakli	Cyprus	INTF
2791	12th	Gospels†	129	Saint Neophytos Monastery	Paphos	Cyprus	INTF
2792	12th	Matthew^{P}, Mark^{P} Luke^{P}	8	Kentron Epistim. Erevnon	Nicosia	Cyprus	
2792	12th	Matthew^{P}, Mark^{P} Luke^{P}	8	Mitropolis	Paphos	Cyprus	
2793	13th	Gospel of Matthew 22:7–22	1	Bible Museum, Ms. 11	Münster	Germany	CSNTM, INTF
2794	12th	Gospels†, Revelation 1:1-22:12†	152	Duke University, Greek MS 100	Durham, NC	United States	DU
2794	12th	Gospels†, Revelation 1:1-22:12†	152	Duke University, Greek MS 100	Durham, NC	United States	INTF
2795	13th	1 Peter 4:3-5:6; 1 John 3:12-4:10	2	Austrian National Library, Suppl. gr. 119	Vienna	Austria	ANL
2796	13th	Luke^{P}	71	State Library, Cim I, 7	Oldenburg	Germany	
2797	14th	Acts^{P}	8	Saint Catherine's Monastery, N. E. M 29	Sinai	Egypt	
2798	12th	Mark^{P}	7	Saint Catherine's Monastery, N. E. M 93	[Sinai	Egypt	
2799	14th	Acts^{P}, General Epistles^{P}, Pauline Epistles^{P}	186	Saint Catherine's Monastery, N. E. M 120	Sinai	Egypt	
2800	10th	Matthew†, Mark†	31	Saint Catherine's Monastery, N. E. M 171	Sinai	Egypt	

[top]

== See also ==
- List of New Testament lectionaries
- List of New Testament minuscules (1–1000)
- List of New Testament minuscules (1001–2000)
- List of New Testament minuscules (2001–)
- List of New Testament papyri
- List of New Testament uncials
- Lists of New Testament minuscules

== Bibliography ==
- Aland, Kurt; M. Welte; B. Köster; K. Junack (1994). Kurzgefasste Liste der griechischen Handschriften des Neues Testaments. Berlin, New York: Walter de Gruyter. p. 95. ISBN 3-11-011986-2.
- "Liste Handschriften". Münster: Institute for New Testament Textual Research.
