= Bible Museum Münster =

Museum in Germany

Coordinates: 51°57′40″N 7°37′24″E

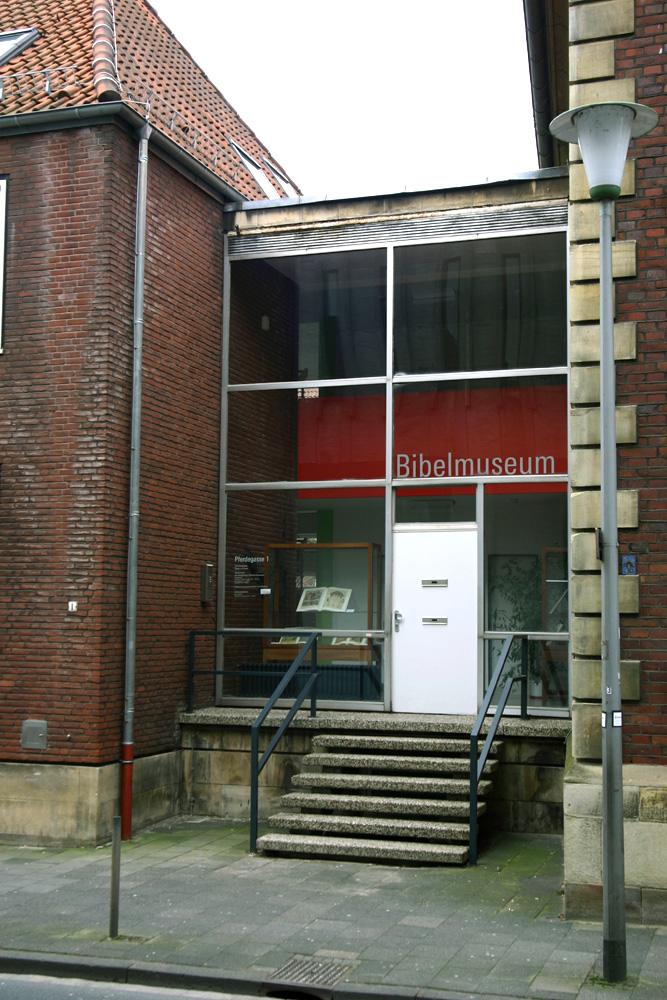
Bible Museum Münster

Bible Museum Münster is a museum located in Münster, Germany, telling the story of the Bible from its handwritten beginnings until today. The main focus lies on the tradition of Greek New Testament as well as the German Bible. The museum forms part of the Institute for New Testament Textual Research at the University of Münster.

== History ==
The museum was founded as a department of the Institute for New Testament Textual Research by Kurt Aland and was opened with a ceremonial act on 8 March 1979 in the presence of Federal President Walter Scheel. It was the first and only Bible museum worldwide at that time. In 1983, Barbara Aland became its director and she was followed in October 2004 by Holger Strutwolf.

== Collection ==
The museum exhibits include:

- Earliest Greek manuscripts on papyrus, parchment and paper
- Representative of the Greek printed books New Testament
- Bible illustrations by famous painters such as Hans Holbein and Marc Chagall
- The history of the English Bible: by pre-Lutheran translations via Luther Bible to today's translations in different dialects
- An original reproduction of the Gutenberg Press
- Bible Polyglot: Multilingual editions (Latin, Coptic, Syrian, Ethiopian etc.) as a mirror of science
- The work of the United Bible Societies

The basis of its holdings is a private collection. Some parts of the older holdings of the Institute of New Testament Textual Research were added. Over the years the collection was expanded further with significant exhibits; it is augmented by changing items on loan from a private manuscript collector from Norway. In April 2010, the Bible Museum in Germany received the largest private collection of Bibles from collector Walter Remy. This classical language Bible collection includes 379 Latin, Greek and 16 200 multilingual Bibles from the 16th to the 18th century.

Since the Bible Museum is part of the Institute for New Testament Textual Research (INTF) which holds some original manuscripts of the New Testament, those manuscripts can be seen in the Bible Museum in Münster.

- Minuscules: 676, 798, 1432, 2444, 2445, 2446, 2460, 2754, 2755, 2756, 2793;
- Lectionaries: ℓ1681, ℓ1682, ℓ1683, ℓ1684 (lower script Uncial 0233), ℓ1685, ℓ1686, ℓ2005, ℓ2137, ℓ2208, and ℓ2276.

== See also ==
- Institute for New Testament Textual Research
- Biblical manuscripts
- Kurt Aland
