= Lectionary 1684 =

1247 New Testament manuscript

Lectionary ℓ1684
- New Testament manuscript
- Text: Evangelistarion
- Date: 1247
- Script: Greek
- Now at: Bible Museum Münster
- Size: 27 by 21 cm

Lectionary 1684, designated by ℓ1684, in the Gregory-Aland numbering, is a Greek manuscript of the New Testament, on parchment leaves, dated paleographically to the 13th century.

== Description ==
It is written in Greek minuscule letters, on 166 parchment leaves (27 by 21 cm), 2 columns per page, 23-26 lines per page. The codex contains some Lessons from the four Gospels lectionary (Evangelistarium) with some lacunae. According to the colophon it was written in 1247. A large portion of this manuscripts is a palimpsest. The lower text was written in uncial letters in 8th century, it contains the text of the four Gospels and was catalogued as Uncial 0233 by INTF.

The codex now is located in the Bible Museum Münster (MS. 1).

== See also ==
- List of New Testament lectionaries
- Textual criticism
- Bible Museum Münster
