= Uncial 0233 =

- New Testament manuscript
- Text: Gospels †
- Date: 8th-century
- Script: Greek
- Now at: Bible Museum Münster
- Size: 27 x 21 cm
- Type: Alexandrian text-type
- Category: III

Uncial 0233 (in the Gregory-Aland numbering), is a Greek uncial manuscript of the New Testament. The manuscript paleographically had been assigned to the 8th-century.

== Description ==
It contains a text of the four Gospels, on 93 parchment leaves (27 by 21 cm), with some lacunae. The text is written in two columns per page, 23-27 lines per page.

It is a palimpsest, the upper text, Lectionary 1684, was written in a minuscule hand. In result the manuscript has two texts of the New Testament, and it is classified on two different lists: on the list of uncials and on the list of lectionaries.

== Text ==
The Greek text of the codex is a representative of the Alexandrian text-type heavily interpolated by the Byzantine readings. Kurt Aland placed it in Category III (with the profile of 47^{1}, 23^{2}, 3^{1/2}, 5^{s}).

Textual variants

(The words before the bracket are of UBS edition, the words after the bracket are the readings of the codex).

Matthew 2:21 – εισηλθεν ] ηλθεν (went) — D, L, W, 0250, f^{1}, f^{13}, ℳ
Matthew 6:13 – it contains doxology
Matthew 11:2 – Χριστου ] Ιησου (supported by Codex Bezae, 1424, ℓ 241, and other)

== History ==
It is dated by the Institute for New Testament Textual Research to the 8th-century.

The manuscript was added to the list of the New Testament manuscripts by Kurt Aland in 1954.

The codex used to be housed at the Bible Museum Münster (MS. 1), in the University of Münster.

== See also ==
- List of New Testament uncials
- List of New Testament lectionaries
- Textual criticism
- Bible Museum Münster
