= Lectionary 2276 =

Greek manuscript of the New Testament

Lectionary ℓ 2276
- New Testament manuscript
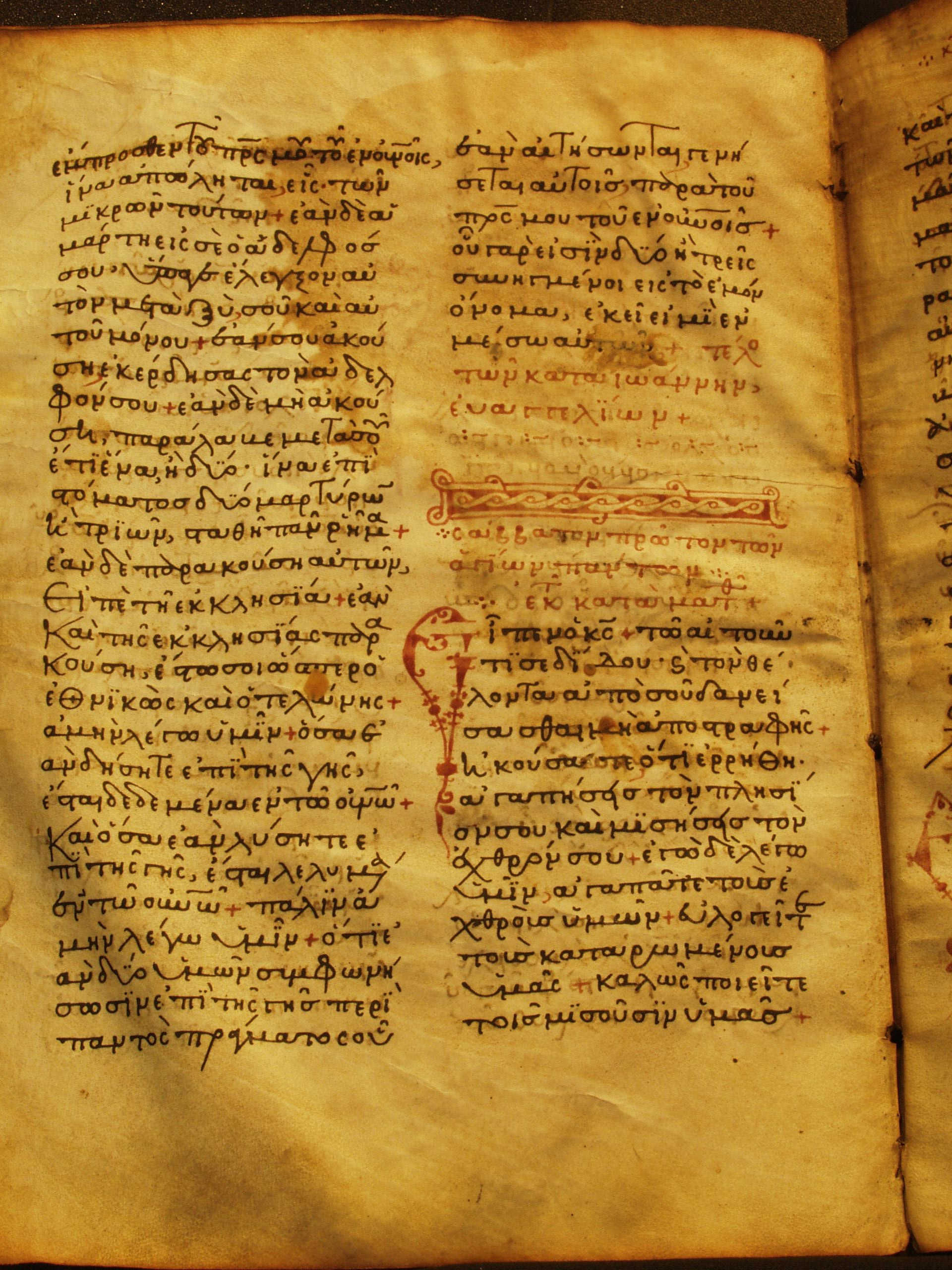
- Folio 5 verso
- Text: Evangelistarion
- Date: 13th/14th century
- Script: Greek
- Now at: Bible Museum Münster
- Size: 29.2 by 23 cm

Lectionary 2276, designated by ℓ 2276 in the Gregory-Aland numbering, is a Greek manuscript of the New Testament, on parchment leaves, dated paleographically to the 12th, 13th or 14th century.

== Description ==
It is written in Greek minuscule letters, on 55 parchment leaves (29.2 by 23 cm), 2 columns per page, 28 lines per page. The codex contains the weekday Gospel Lessons (Evangelistarium), which were read from Easter to Pentecost and Saturday/Sunday Gospel lessons for the other weeks.

It is dated by the INTF to the 13th or 14th century.

The codex now is located in the Bible Museum Münster (MS. 21).

== See also ==
- List of New Testament lectionaries
- Biblical manuscripts
- Textual criticism
- Bible Museum Münster
