= Lectionary 1685 =

Lectionary ℓ1685
- New Testament manuscript
- Text: Evangelistarion, Apostolos
- Date: 15th/16th century
- Script: Greek
- Now at: Bible Museum Münster
- Size: 27.5 by 19 cm

Lectionary 1685, designated by ℓ1685, in the Gregory-Aland numbering, is a Greek manuscript of the New Testament, on paper leaves, dated paleographically to the 16th century (or 15th century).

== Description ==
The codex contains some Lessons from the Gospels lectionary (Evangelistarium), from Acts of the Apostles and General epistles (Apostolos) with some lacunae. It is written in Greek minuscule letters, on 263 paper leaves (27.5 by 19 cm), 2 columns per page, 31 lines per page.

The codex now is located in the Bible Museum Münster (MS. 16).

== See also ==
- List of New Testament lectionaries
- Textual criticism
- Bible Museum Münster
