= Lectionary 1682 =

Lectionary ℓ1682
- New Testament manuscript
- Text: Evangelistarion
- Date: 16th
- Script: Greek
- Now at: Bible Museum Münster
- Size: 27 by 14.5 cm

Lectionary 1682, designated by symbol ℓ 1682 in the Gregory-Aland numbering, is a Greek manuscript of the New Testament, on paper leaves, dated paleographically to the 16th century.

== Description ==
It is written in Greek cursive letters, on 131 leaves (27 by 14.5 cm), 1 column per page, 24 lines per page. The codex contains some Lessons from the four Gospels lectionary (Evangelistarium) with some lacunae.

The codex now is located in the Bible Museum Münster (MS. 14).

== See also ==
- List of New Testament lectionaries
- Textual criticism
- Bible Museum Münster
