= Lectionary 2137 =

Greek manuscript

Lectionary ℓ2137
- New Testament manuscript
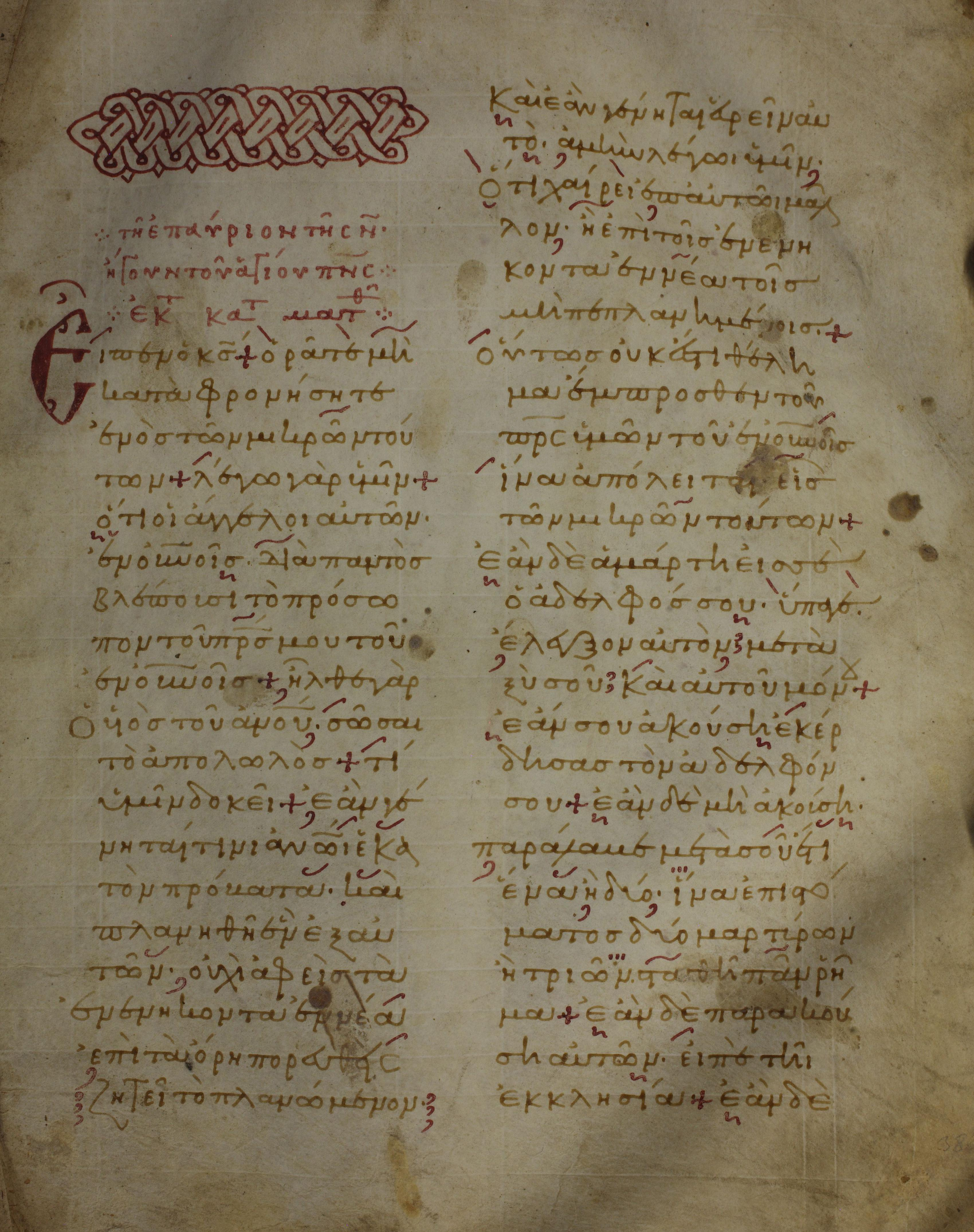
- Text: Evangelistarion
- Date: 12th century
- Script: Greek
- Now at: Bible Museum Münster
- Size: 32 by 24.5 cm

Lectionary 2137, designated by ℓ 2137 in the Gregory-Aland numbering. It is a Greek manuscript of the New Testament, on parchment leaves, dated paleographically to the 12th century.

== Description ==
The codex contains some Lessons from the four Gospels lectionary (Evangelistarium) with some lacunae. The text is written in Greek minuscule letters, on 213 parchment leaves (32 by 24.5 cm), in 8-leaf quires. The text is written in 2 columns per page, 24 lines per page. It has breathings and accents. The nomina sacra are written in an abbreviated way. The initial letters are decorated.

The codex now is located in the Bible Museum Münster (MS. 17).

== See also ==
- List of New Testament lectionaries
- Biblical manuscripts
- Textual criticism
- Bible Museum Münster
