= Minuscule 1432 =

- New Testament manuscript
- Text: Gospels †
- Date: 12th century
- Script: Greek
- Now at: Bible Museum Münster
- Cite: K. Lake, Texts from Mount Athos, SBE, 5 (Oxford 1902), pp. 88-185
- Size: 14.7 cm by 11.5 cm
- Type: Byzantine text-type

Minuscule 1432 (in the Gregory-Aland numbering), is a Greek minuscule manuscript of the New Testament, on 225 parchment leaves (14.7 cm by 11.5 cm). Dated paleografically to the 12th century.

== Description ==
The codex contains a complete text of the four Gospels with some lacunae. It contains Epistula ad Carpianum, Eusebian tables, tables of κεφαλαια, Ammonian Sections, subscriptions, Synaxarion, Menologion. Written in one column per page, in 28–29 lines per page (size of text 11.1 by 6.8 cm). It contains the pericope John 7:53-8:11.

== Text ==
The Greek text of the codex, is a representative of the Byzantine text-type. Kurt Aland did not place it in any Category. It was not examined by the Claremont Profile Method.

== History ==
The codex came from Athos, now is located in the Bible Museum Münster (Ms. 3).

== See also ==
- List of New Testament minuscules (1001-2000)
- Textual criticism
- Bible Museum Münster
