= Lectionary 1681 =

Lectionary ℓ 1681
- New Testament manuscript
- Text: Evangelistarion
- Date: 15th century
- Script: Greek
- Now at: Bible Museum Münster
- Size: 21.5 by 15 cm

Lectionary 1681, or ℓ 1681 in the Gregory-Aland numbering, is a Greek manuscript of the New Testament, on paper leaves, dated paleographically to the 15th century.

== Description ==
It is written in Greek minuscule letters, written on 186 paper leaves (21.5 cm by 15 cm), in 1 column per page, 26-28 lines per page. The codex contains some Lessons from the four Gospels lectionary (Evangelistarium). The initial letters in red. It contains the decorated headpieces, hypothesis, and some notes on the margin.

The codex now is located in the Bible Museum Münster (MS. 12).

== See also ==
- List of New Testament lectionaries
- Textual criticism
- Bible Museum Münster
