= Lectionary 1686 =

Greek manuscript of the New Testament

Lectionary ℓ 1686
- New Testament manuscript
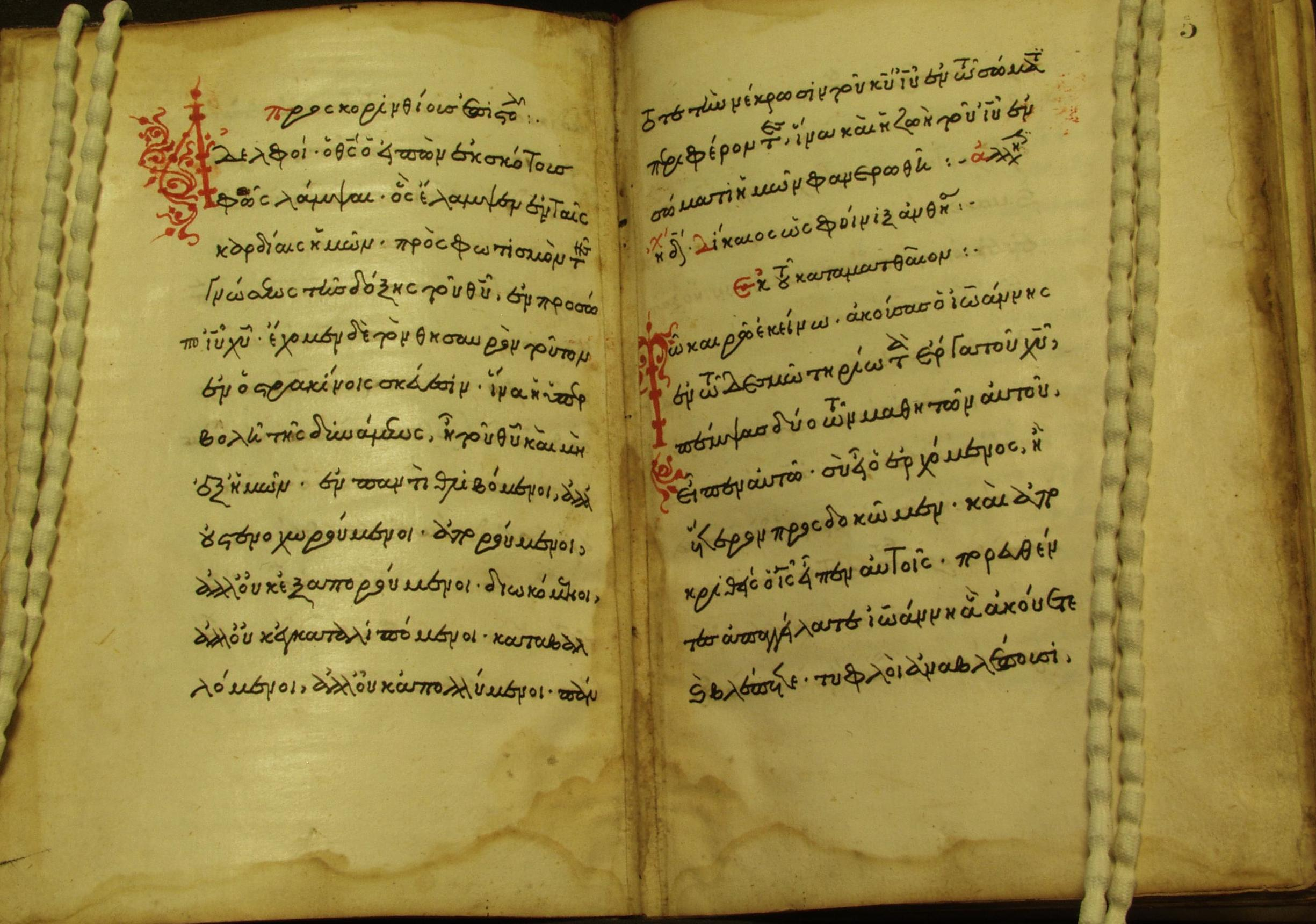
- folio 4v and folio 5r
- Text: Apostolos
- Date: 16th century
- Script: Greek
- Now at: Bible Museum Münster
- Size: 20.5 by 15 cm

Lectionary 1686, designated by symbol ℓ 1686 in the Gregory-Aland numbering, is a Greek manuscript of the New Testament, written on paper leaves, it dates paleographically to the 16th century.

== Description ==
It is written in Greek minuscule letters, on 184 paper leaves (20.5 by 15 cm), 1 column per page, 17 lines per page. The codex contains some Lessons from the Acts of the Apostles and Catholic epistles (Apostolos) with some lacunae. It has breathings and accents. The initial letters in red and decorated; the nomina sacra are written in an abbreviated way. It contains marginal notes. The text is rarely corrected. It contains Menologion.

In Ephesian 6:14 phrase και ενδυσαμενοι τον θωρακα της δικαιοσυνης is omitted, but it was added at the margin.

== History ==
Formerly it was held in the Iviron monastery (825) at Athos peninsula.

The codex now is located in the Bible Museum Münster (MS. 13).

== Gallery ==
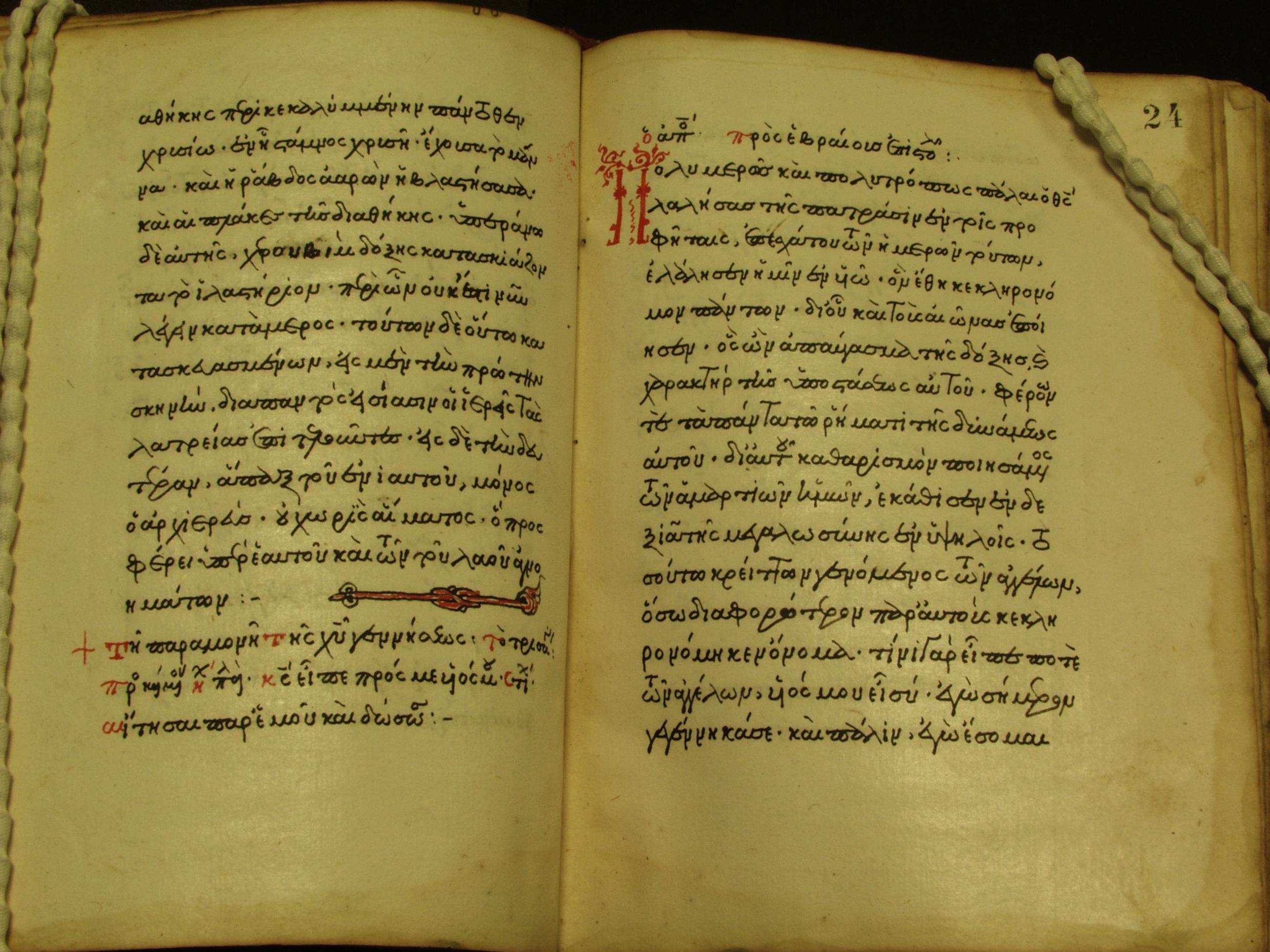

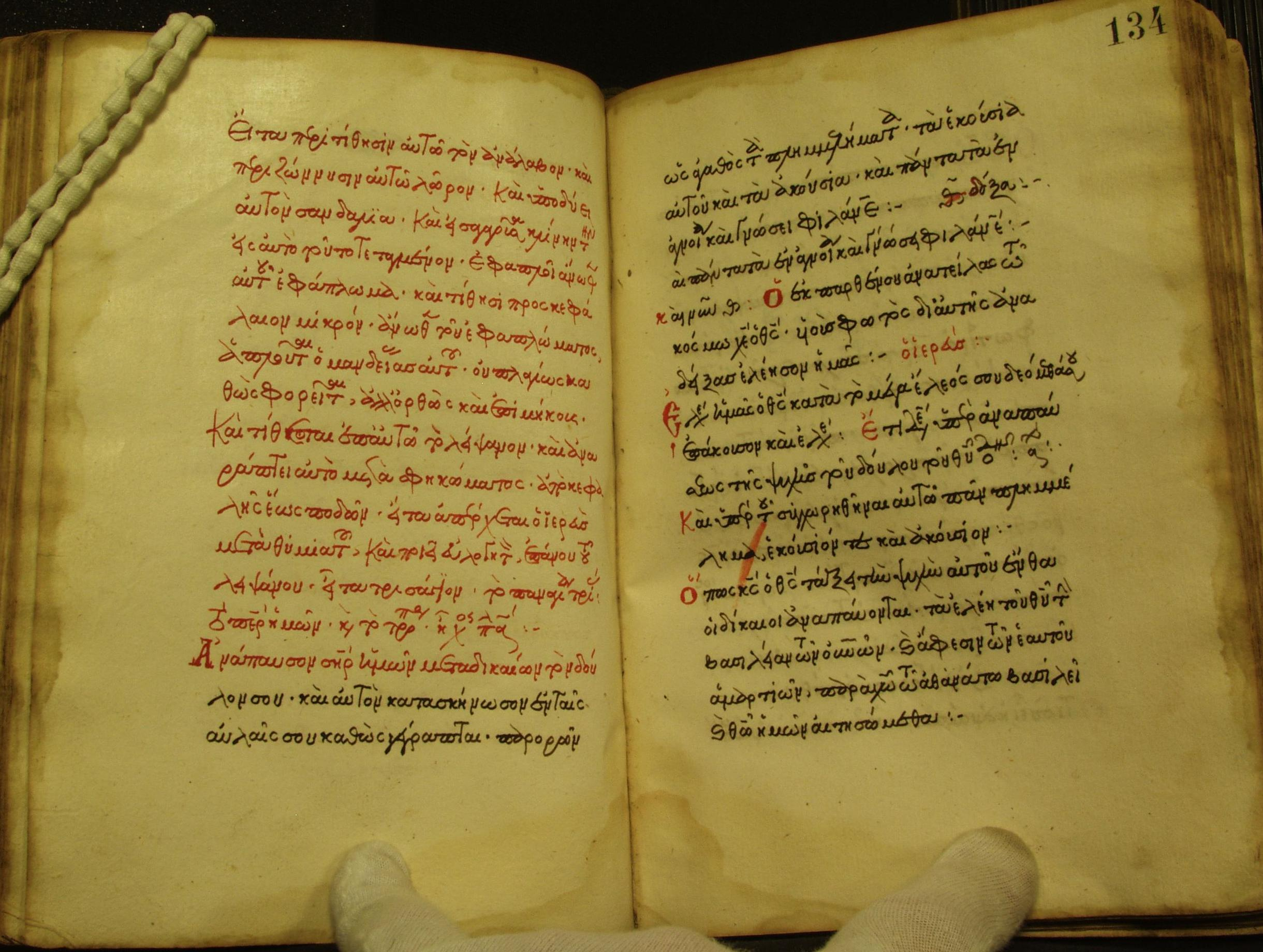

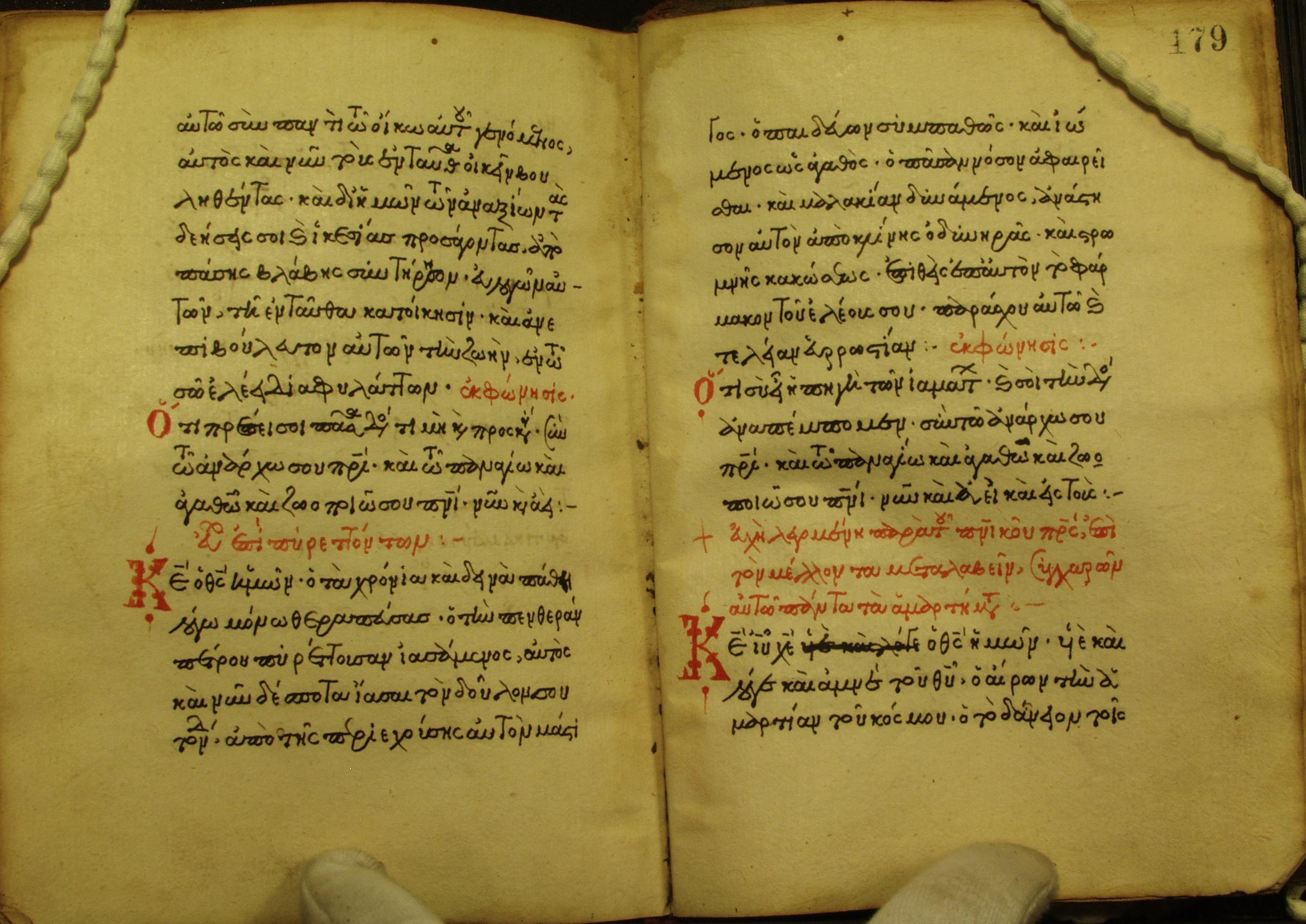

== See also ==
- List of New Testament lectionaries
- Textual criticism
- Bible Museum Münster
