= Lectionary 1683 =

Lectionary ℓ1683
- New Testament manuscript
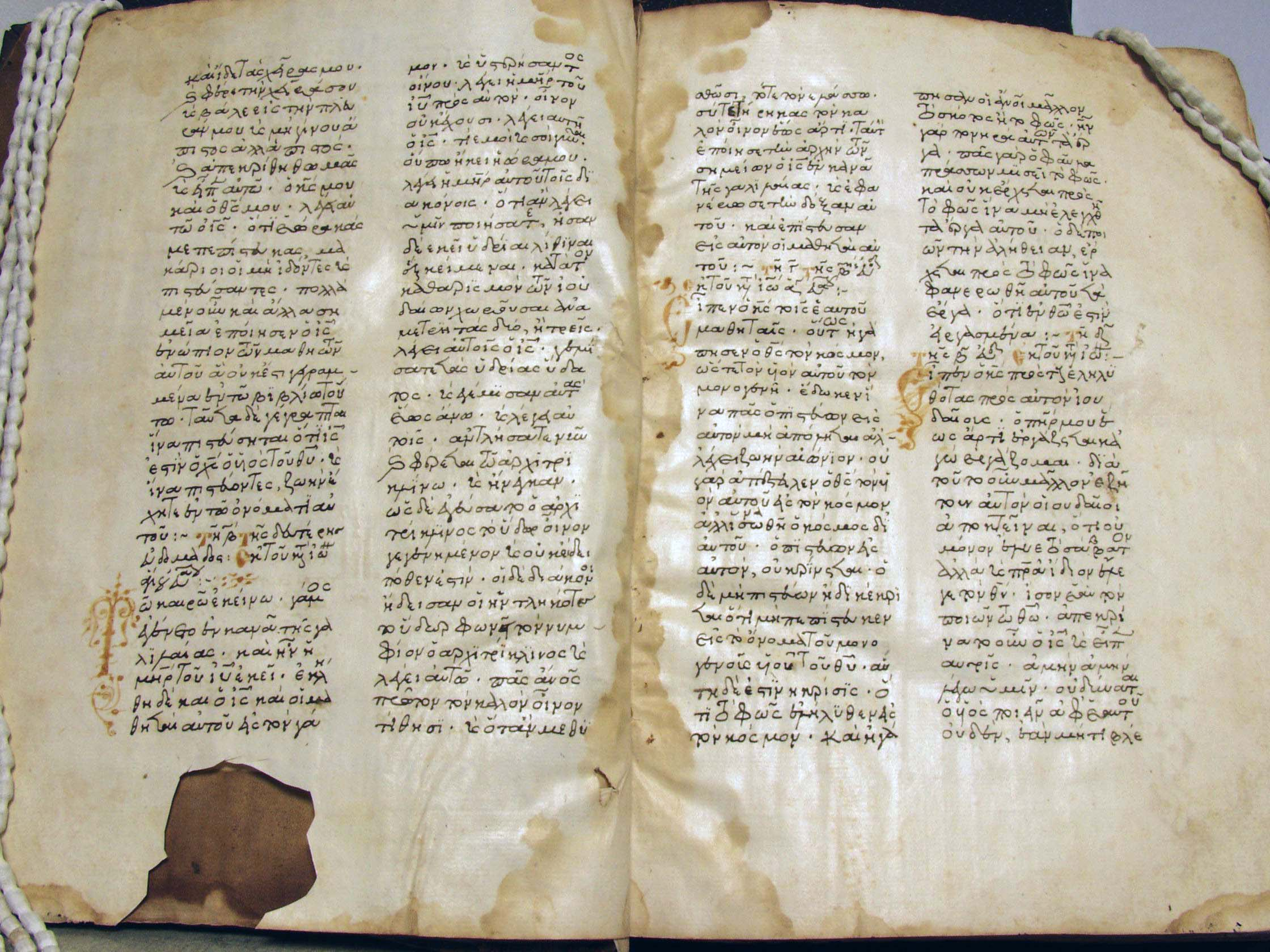
- Text: Evangelistarion
- Date: 13th century
- Script: Greek
- Now at: Bible Museum Münster
- Size: 29.5 by 22 cm

Lectionary 1683, designated by ℓ 1683 in the Gregory-Aland numbering, is a Greek manuscript of the New Testament, on parchment leaves, dated paleographically to the 13th century.

== Description ==
It is written in Greek minuscule letters, on 241 parchment leaves (29.5 by 22 cm), 2 columns per page, 26 lines per page. The codex contains some Lessons from the four Gospels lectionary (Evangelistarium) with some lacunae. It has breathings and accents.

The codex now is located in the Bible Museum Münster (MS. 15).

== See also ==
- List of New Testament lectionaries
- Biblical manuscripts
- Textual criticism
- Bible Museum Münster
