= Lectionary 2208 =

Lectionary ℓ2208
- New Testament manuscript
- Text: Evangelistarion
- Date: 11th/12th century
- Script: Greek
- Now at: Bible Museum Münster
- Size: 22.3 by 17 cm

Lectionary 2208, or ℓ 2208 in the Gregory-Aland numbering, is a Greek manuscript of the New Testament, on parchment leaves, dated paleographically to the 11th century (or 12th century).

== Description ==
It is written in Greek minuscule letters, on 207 parchment leaves (22.3 by 17 cm), 2 columns per page, 25 lines per page. The codex contains the Lessons from the four Gospels lectionary (Evangelistarium). Some small parts of the text vanished.

The codex now is located in the Bible Museum Münster (MS. 18).

== See also ==
- List of New Testament lectionaries
- Biblical manuscripts
- Textual criticism
- Bible Museum Münster
