= Lectionary 2005 =

Lectionary ℓ2005
- New Testament manuscript
- Text: Evangelistarion
- Date: 10th
- Script: Greek
- Now at: Byzantine & Christian Museum, Bible Museum Münster
- Size: 32 by 23.5 cm

Lectionary 2005, designated by ℓ 2005 in the Gregory-Aland numbering, is a Greek manuscript of the New Testament, on parchment leaves, dated paleographically to the 10th century.

== Description ==
It is written in large Greek uncial letters, on 3 parchment leaves (32 by 23.5 cm), 2 columns per page, 19 lines per page. The codex contains some Lessons from the Gospels (evangelistarion). The manuscript has survived in a fragmentary condition.

The codex was divided, and now two of its folios are located at the Byzantine Museum (Frg. 42) in Athens, 1 folio is located in the Bible Museum Münster (MS. 20).

== See also ==
- List of New Testament lectionaries
- Textual criticism
- Bible Museum Münster
