= Minuscule 2445 =

- New Testament manuscript
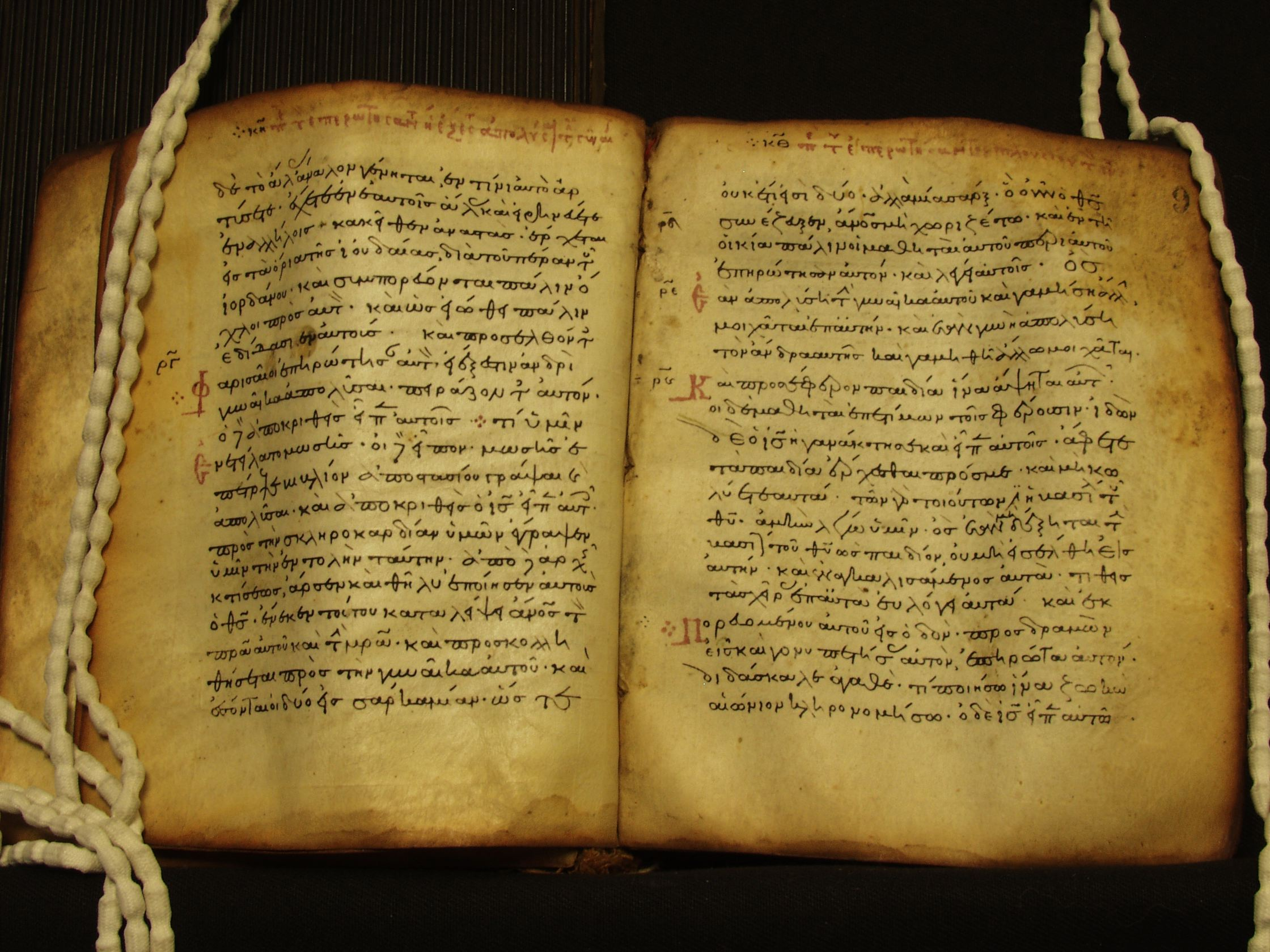
- Text: Gospels †
- Date: 12th century
- Script: Greek
- Now at: Bible Museum Münster
- Size: 16.3 cm by 13 cm
- Type: Byzantine text-type
- Category: V

Minuscule 2445 (in the Gregory-Aland numbering). It is a Greek minuscule manuscript of the New Testament, on 116 parchment leaves (16.3 cm by 13 cm). It is dated paleographically to the 12th century. A large part of the codex lost.

== Description ==
Originally the codex contained the text of the four Gospels. Actually it has some lacunae, at the beginning, end, and inside (Luke 1:1-17; John 1:1-12). It contains text of Mark 7:10-John 7:32. The text is written in one column per page, in 20-22 lines per page. The initial letters in red. It has breathings and accents.

It contains tables of the κεφαλαια, numbers of the κεφαλαια at the margin, the τιτλοι at the top of the pages, the Ammonian Sections, references to the Eusebian Canons.

The Greek text of the codex is a representative of the Byzantine text-type. Aland placed it in Category V. It was not examined by the Claremont Profile Method.

It contains spurious texts of Luke 22:43-44 and John 5:3.4.

The codex now is located in the Bible Museum Münster (Ms. 5).

== See also ==
- List of New Testament minuscules (2001–)
- Textual criticism
- Bible Museum Münster

== Gallery ==
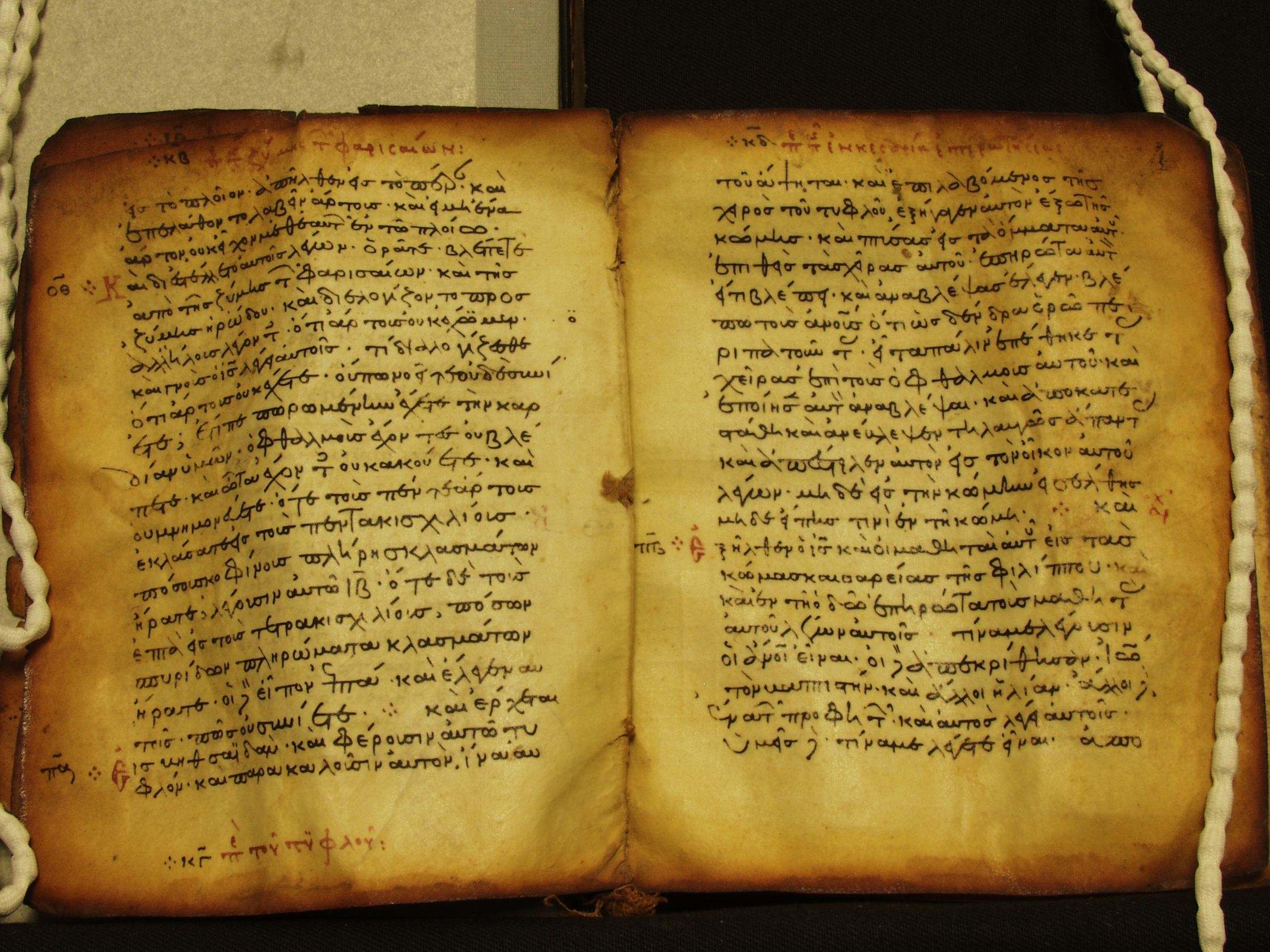
Mark 8:13-29

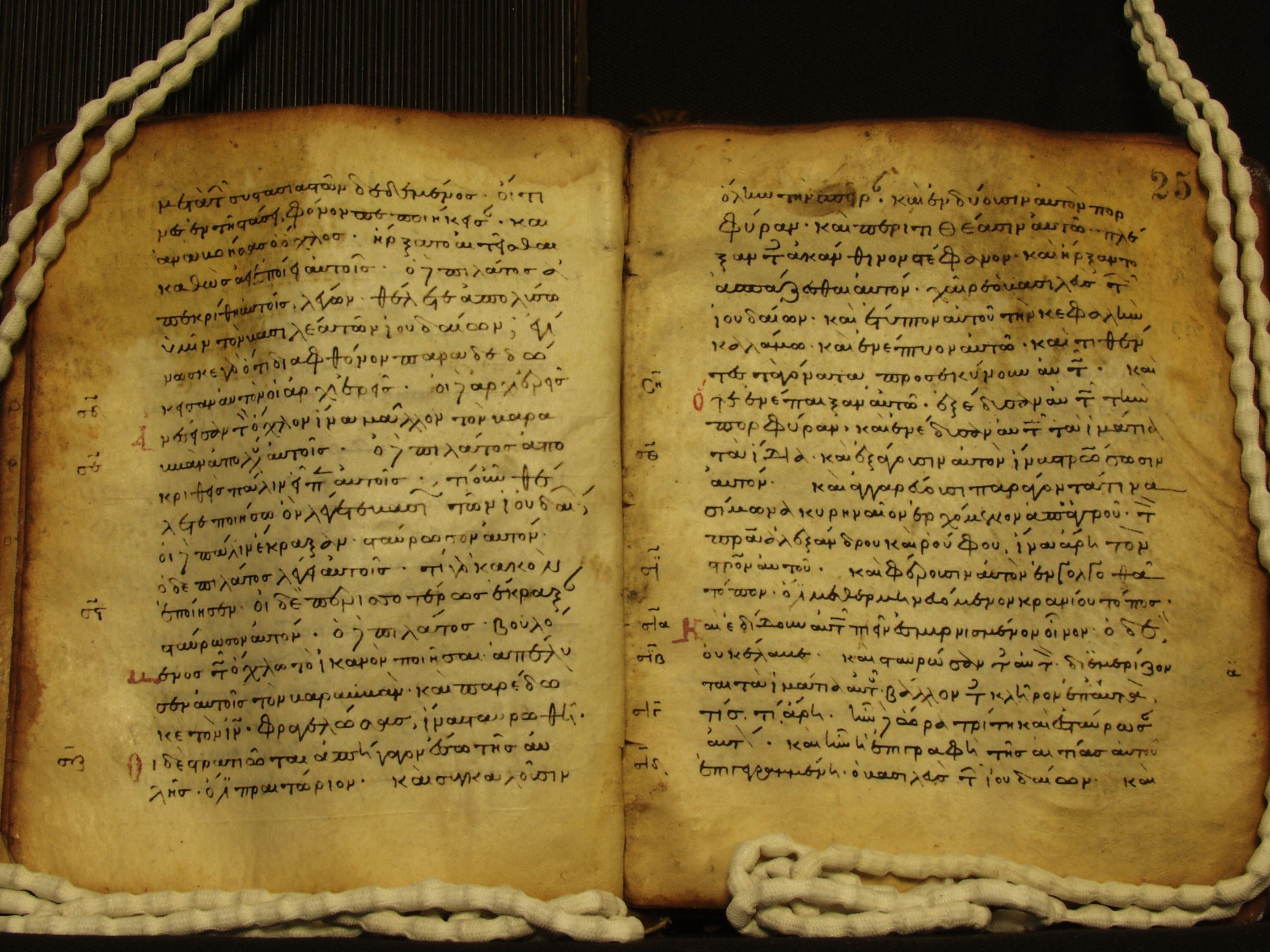
Mark 15:6-27
