= Minuscule 2460 =

- New Testament manuscript
- Text: Gospels †
- Date: 12th century
- Script: Greek
- Now at: Bible Museum Münster
- Size: 24.7 cm by 17.5 cm
- Type: Byzantine text-type

Minuscule 2460 (in the Gregory-Aland numbering), is a Greek minuscule manuscript of the New Testament, on 205 parchment leaves (24.7 cm by 17.5 cm). It is dated paleographically to the 12th century.

== Description ==
The codex contains the text of the four Gospels with some lacunae. The text is written in one column per page, in 26 lines per page.

The Greek text of the codex is a representative of the Byzantine text-type. Aland did not place it in any Category. According to the Claremont Profile Method it belongs to the textual family Family K^{r} in Luke 1 and Luke 20 as a perfect member. In Luke 10 no profile was made.

195 folios of the codex now are housed at the Ioannina, Zosimea School, 2. Ten leaves were catalogued as codex 2417 are located at the Columbia University, Plimpton Ms. 12, and at the Bible Museum Münster (Ms. 19).

== See also ==
- List of New Testament minuscules
- Textual criticism
- Bible Museum Münster
