= Minuscule 2756 =

- New Testament manuscript
- Text: Gospels
- Date: 13th century
- Script: Greek
- Now at: Bible Museum Münster
- Size: 18.7 cm by 14.5 cm
- Category: none

Minuscule 2756 (in the Gregory-Aland numbering), is a Greek minuscule manuscript of the New Testament. Dated paleographically to the 13th century.

== Description ==
The codex contains a complete text of the four Gospels, on 195 parchment leaves (18.7 cm by 14.5 cm). Written in one column per page, in 25 lines per page.

Kurt Aland did not place it in any Category. According to the Claremont Profile Method it represents the textual family Π^{b} in Luke 1 and Luke 20. In Luke 10 no profile was made.

The codex now is housed at Bible Museum Münster (Ms. 10).

== See also ==
- List of New Testament minuscules
- Textual criticism
- Biblical manuscript
- Bible Museum Münster
