= Minuscule 798 =

- New Testament manuscript
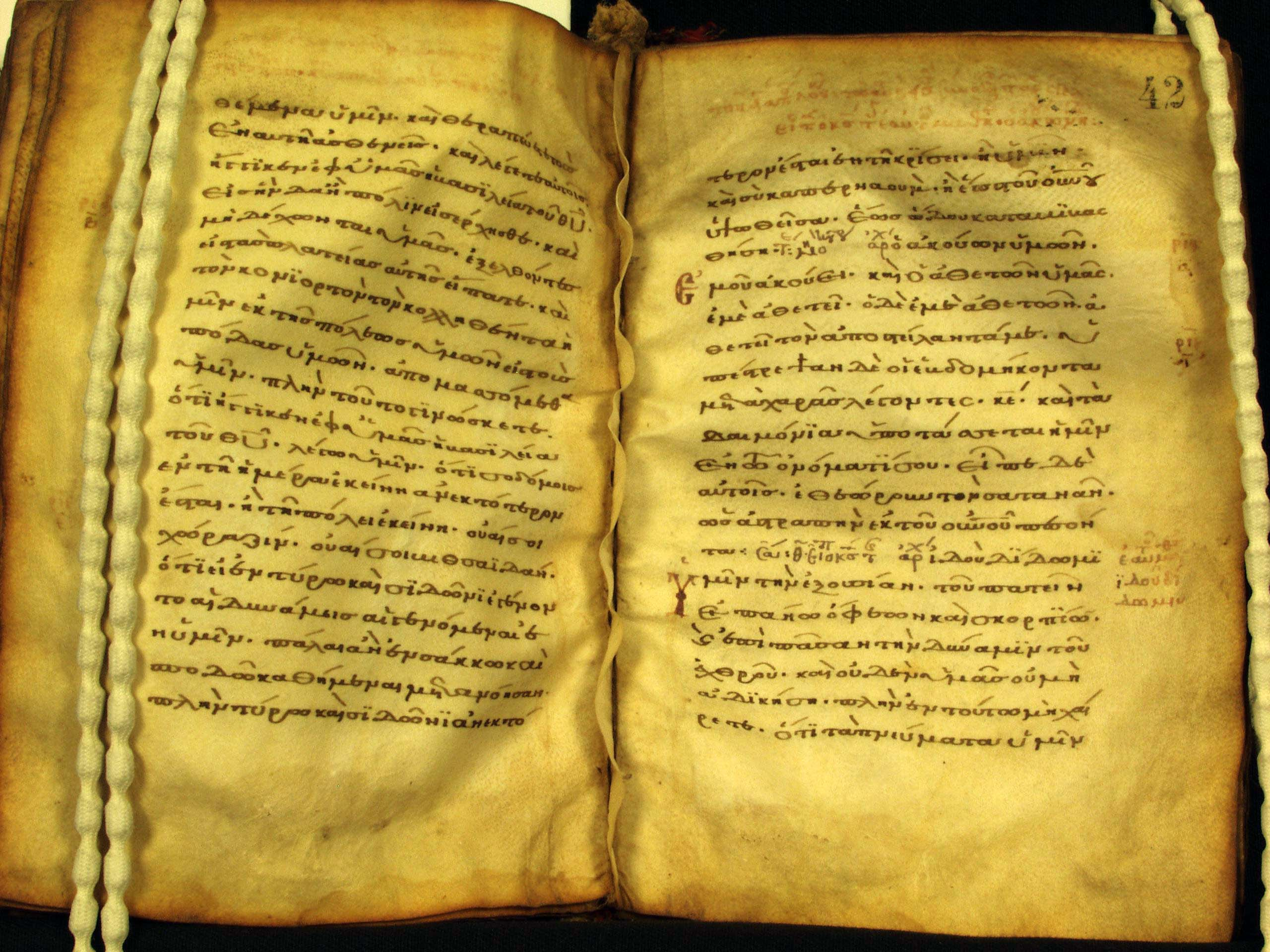
- Text: Gospels †
- Date: 11th century
- Script: Greek
- Now at: Bible Museum Münster
- Size: 17 cm by 11.5 cm
- Type: Byzantine text-type
- Category: V

Minuscule 798 (in the Gregory-Aland numbering) ε 473 (Soden). It is a Greek minuscule manuscript of the New Testament, on 260 parchment leaves (17 cm by 11.5 cm). It is dated palaeographically to the 11th century.

== Description ==
The codex contains the text of the Gospels with some lacunae (Mark 1:-8:2). The text is written in one column per page, 20 lines per page in minuscule letters. The initial letters in red. Size of the text is 11.4 by 7.5 cm. Mark 1:1-8:2 is faded.

The text is divided according to the κεφαλαια (chapters), whose numbers are given at the margin and their τιτλοι (titles) at the top of the pages. There is also a division according to the smaller Ammonian Sections, with references to the Eusebian Canons.

It contains lectionary markings at the margin and pictures.

== Text ==
The Greek text of the codex is a representative of the Byzantine text-type. Aland placed it in Category V.

It was not examined by using Claremont Profile Method.

== History ==
The codex was divided into two parts and now located in two places. Matthew and Mark on 112 folios are housed in Εθνική Βιβλιοθήκη (137), in Athens. Luke and John on 148 folios are housed in Bibelmuseum (Ms. 7) in Münster.

Gregory saw the manuscript in 1886.

== See also ==
- List of New Testament minuscules
- Textual criticism
