= Minuscule 2793 =

- New Testament manuscript
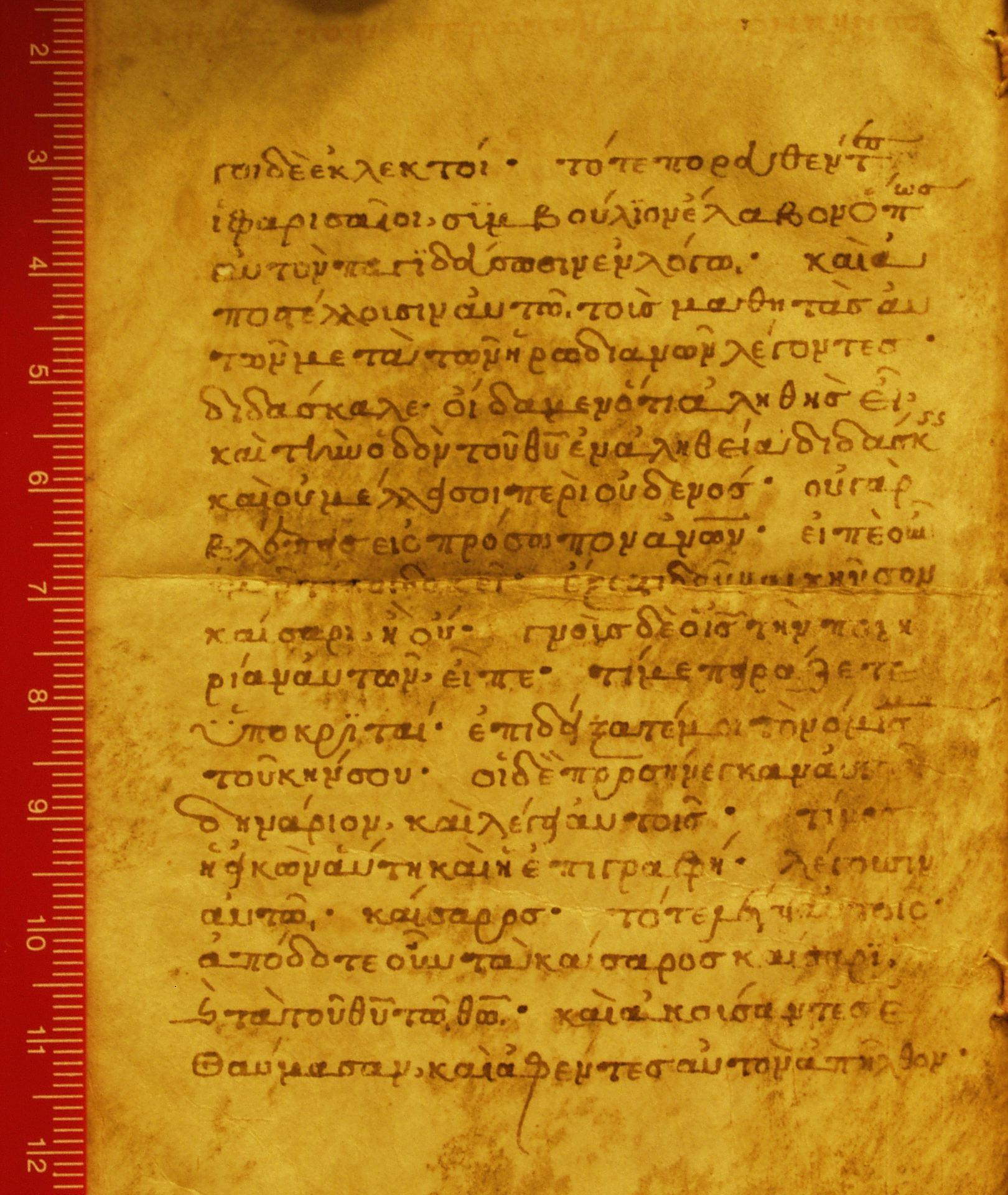
- Page with text of Matthew 22:7-14
- Text: Gospel of Matthew 22:7-22
- Date: 13th/ 14th century
- Script: Greek
- Now at: Bible Museum Münster
- Size: 13.9 cm by 10.3 cm
- Category: none
- Hand: small well-formed hand

Minuscule 2793 (in the Gregory-Aland numbering), is a Greek minuscule manuscript of the New Testament, on 1 parchment leaf (13.9 cm by 10.3 cm). Dated paleographically to the 13th century (or 14th century). Only one leaf has survived.

== Description ==
The codex contains only a fragment text of the Gospel of Matthew 22:7-22. The text is written in one column per page, in 20 lines per page. It has breathings and accents. It is written by small well-formed Greek hand. The margins are wide.

Kurt Aland did not place it in any Category.

This leaf is one of very few authentic pieces which were bought by Thomas Phillipps from Constantine Simonides (in 1853/1854).

The codex is now housed at Bible Museum Münster (Ms. 11).

== See also ==
- List of New Testament minuscules (2001–)
- Textual criticism
- Bible Museum Münster
