= Minuscule 2754 =

- New Testament manuscript
- Text: Gospels †
- Date: 11th century
- Script: Greek
- Now at: Bible Museum Münster
- Size: 19.3 by 14.3 cm (7.6 by 5.6 in)
- Category: none

Minuscule 2754 (in the Gregory-Aland numbering) is a Greek minuscule manuscript of the New Testament, on 256 parchment leaves (19.3 cm by 14.3 cm). It has been dated paleographically to the 11th century.

== Description ==
The codex contains the text of the four Gospels with some lacunae. The text is written in one column per page, with 25 to 26 lines per page.

Kurt Aland did not place it in any Category. It was not examined by the Claremont Profile Method.

The codex now is housed at Bible Museum Münster (Ms. 8).

== See also ==
- List of New Testament minuscules
- Textual criticism
- Bible Museum Münster
