= Minuscule 2446 =

- New Testament manuscript
- Text: Gospels
- Date: 12th century
- Script: Greek
- Now at: Bible Museum Münster
- Size: 16.8 cm by 12.8 cm
- Category: none

Minuscule 2446 (in the Gregory-Aland numbering), is a Greek minuscule manuscript of the New Testament on parchment. Dated paleografically to the 12th century. The manuscript has complex contents.

== Description ==
The codex contains a complete text of the four Gospels, on 320 parchment leaves (16.8 cm by 12.8 cm). The text is written in one column per page, in 22 lines per page.

Kurt Aland did not place it in any Category. Wisse did not examine it by using the Claremont Profile Method.

The codex now is located in the Bible Museum Münster (Ms. 6).

== See also ==
- List of New Testament minuscules (2001–)
- Textual criticism
- Bible Museum Münster
