= Minuscule 2444 =

- New Testament manuscript
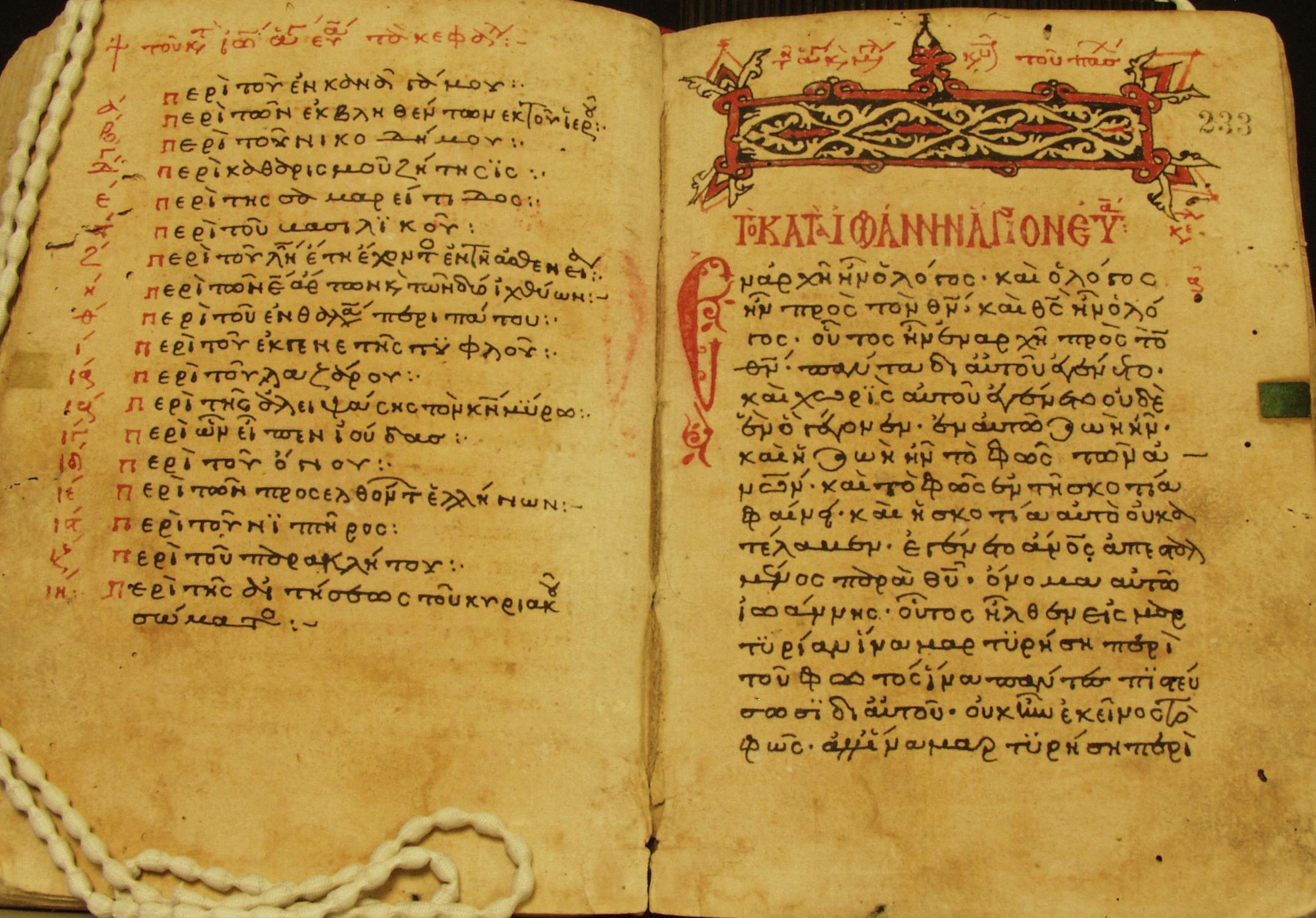
- List of the κεφαλαια to John and the first page of John; the decorated headpiece
- Text: Gospels †
- Date: 13th century
- Script: Greek
- Now at: Bible Museum Münster
- Size: 22 cm by 15 cm
- Type: Byzantine text-type
- Category: none

Minuscule 2444 (in the Gregory-Aland numbering), is a Greek minuscule manuscript of the New Testament, on 309 paper leaves (22 cm by 15 cm). It is dated paleographically to the 13th century. Some leaves of the codex were lost.

== Description ==
The codex contains the text of the four Gospels with some lacunae. The text is written in one column per page, in 22 lines per page.

The decorated headpieces, the large initials are rubricated and in colour, the small initials in red. It has breathings and accents. The nomina sacra are written in an abbreviated way. Error of itacism is frequent.

The text is divided according to the κεφαλαια (chapters), whose numbers are given at the margin, but there is no their τιτλοι (titles) at the top and bottom. There is also another division according to the smaller Ammonian Sections with a references to the Eusebian Canons.

The tables of the κεφαλαια (tables of contents) are placed before Mark, Luke, and John. The table of the κεφαλαια to Matthew has been lost. Some notes and textual corrections were made at the margin.

== Text ==
The Greek text of the codex is a representative of the Byzantine text-type. Kurt Aland did not place it in any category.

It was not examined by using the Claremont Profile Method.

It contains the Pericope Adulterae (John 7:53-8:11).

In John 21:23 it lacks the phrase diviουκ ειπεν αυτω ο ΙΣ οτι ουκ αποθνησκει in the main text, but it was added at the margin.

John 1:28 – Βηθανια ] βιθαβαρα

== History ==
The codex now is located in the Bible Museum Münster (Ms. 4).

== Gallery ==
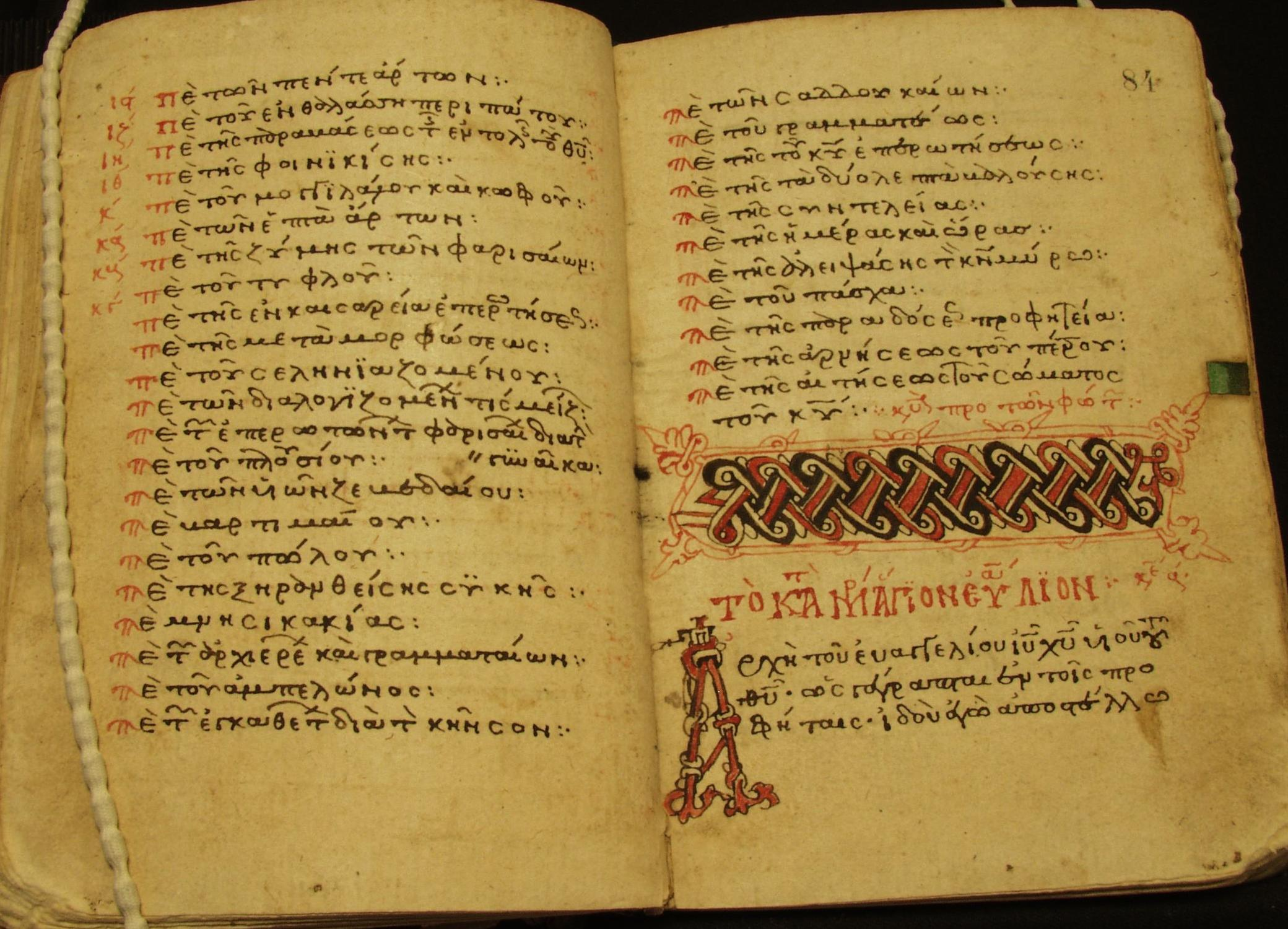
List of the κεφαλαια to Mark and the first page of Mark

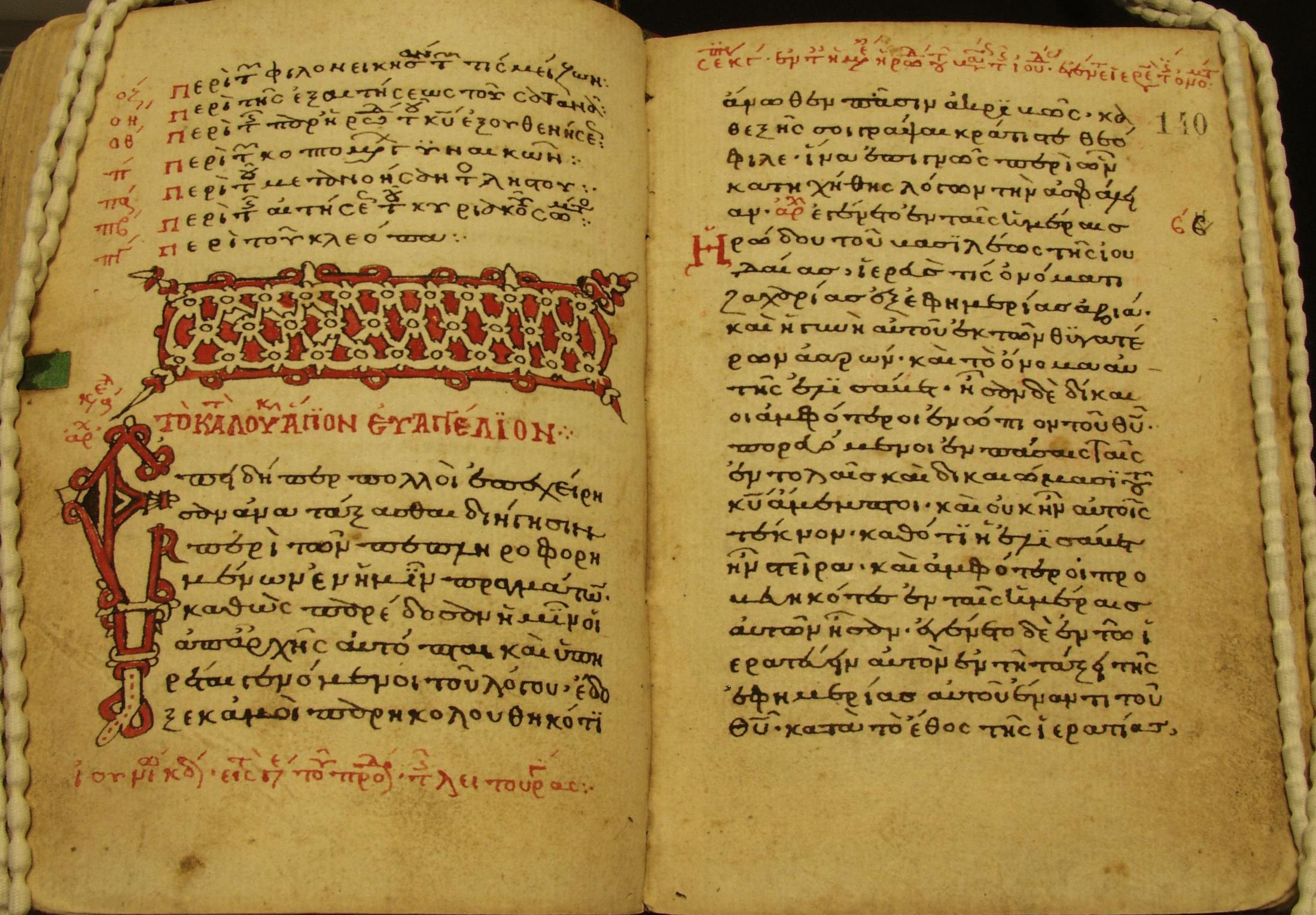
The first page of Luke

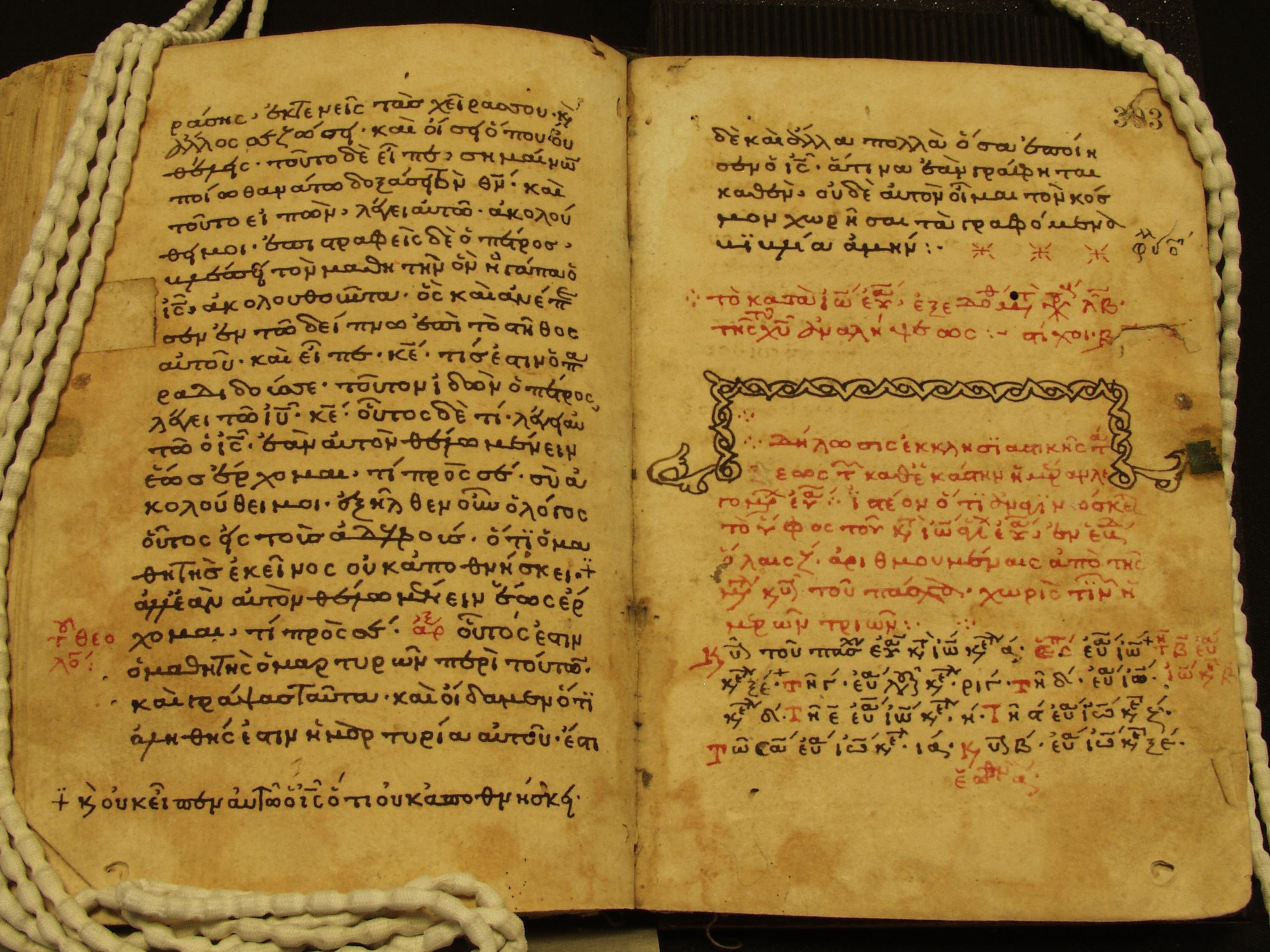
The end of John

== See also ==
- List of New Testament minuscules
- Textual criticism
