= Minuscule 2755 =

- New Testament manuscript
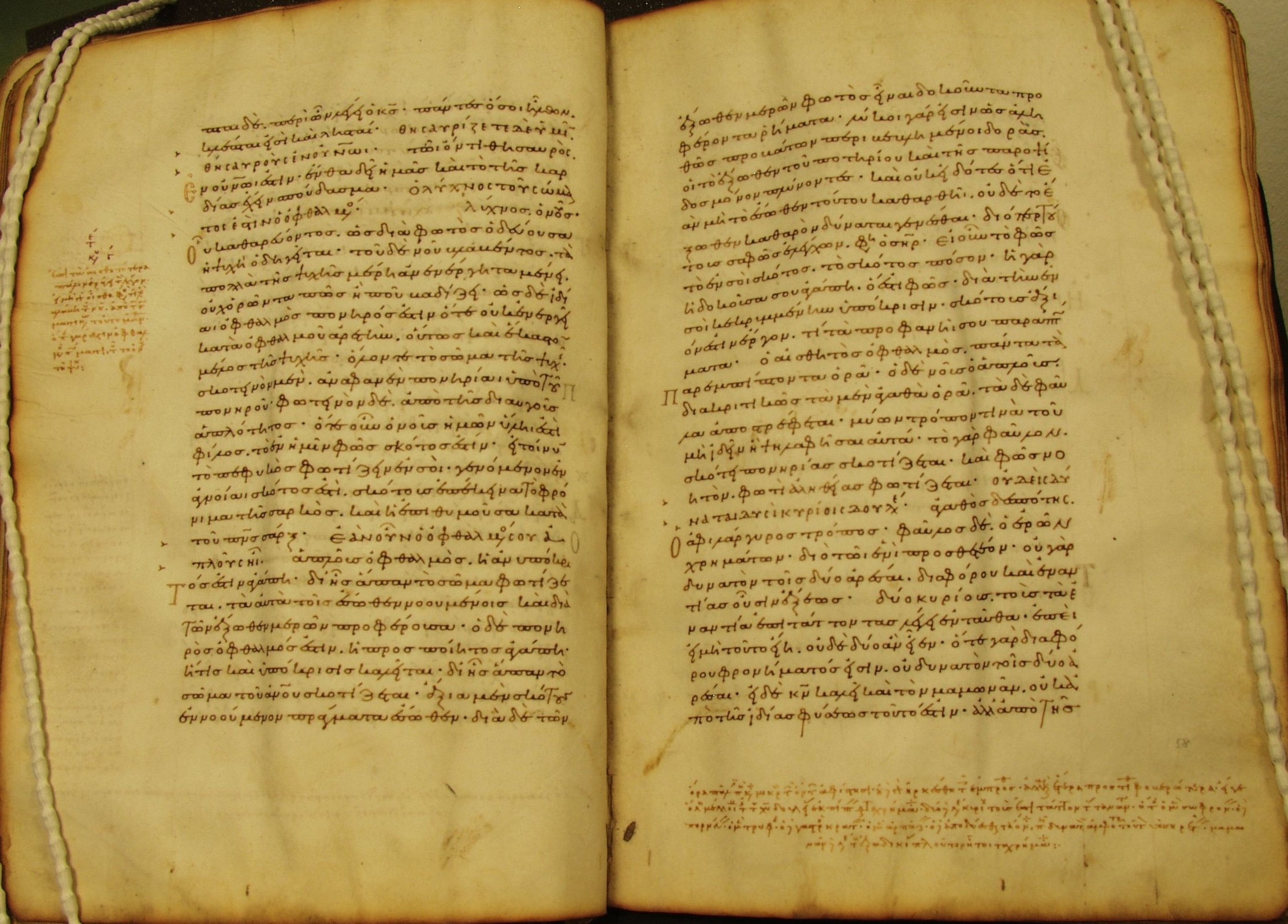
- Folio 64
- Text: Gospels
- Date: 11th century
- Script: Greek
- Now at: Bible Museum Münster
- Size: 32.2 cm by 23.2 cm
- Type: Byzantine text-type
- Category: none

Minuscule 2755 (in the Gregory-Aland numbering), is a Greek minuscule manuscript of the New Testament, on 370 parchment leaves (32.2 cm by 23.2 cm). Dated paleografically to the 11th century.

== Description ==
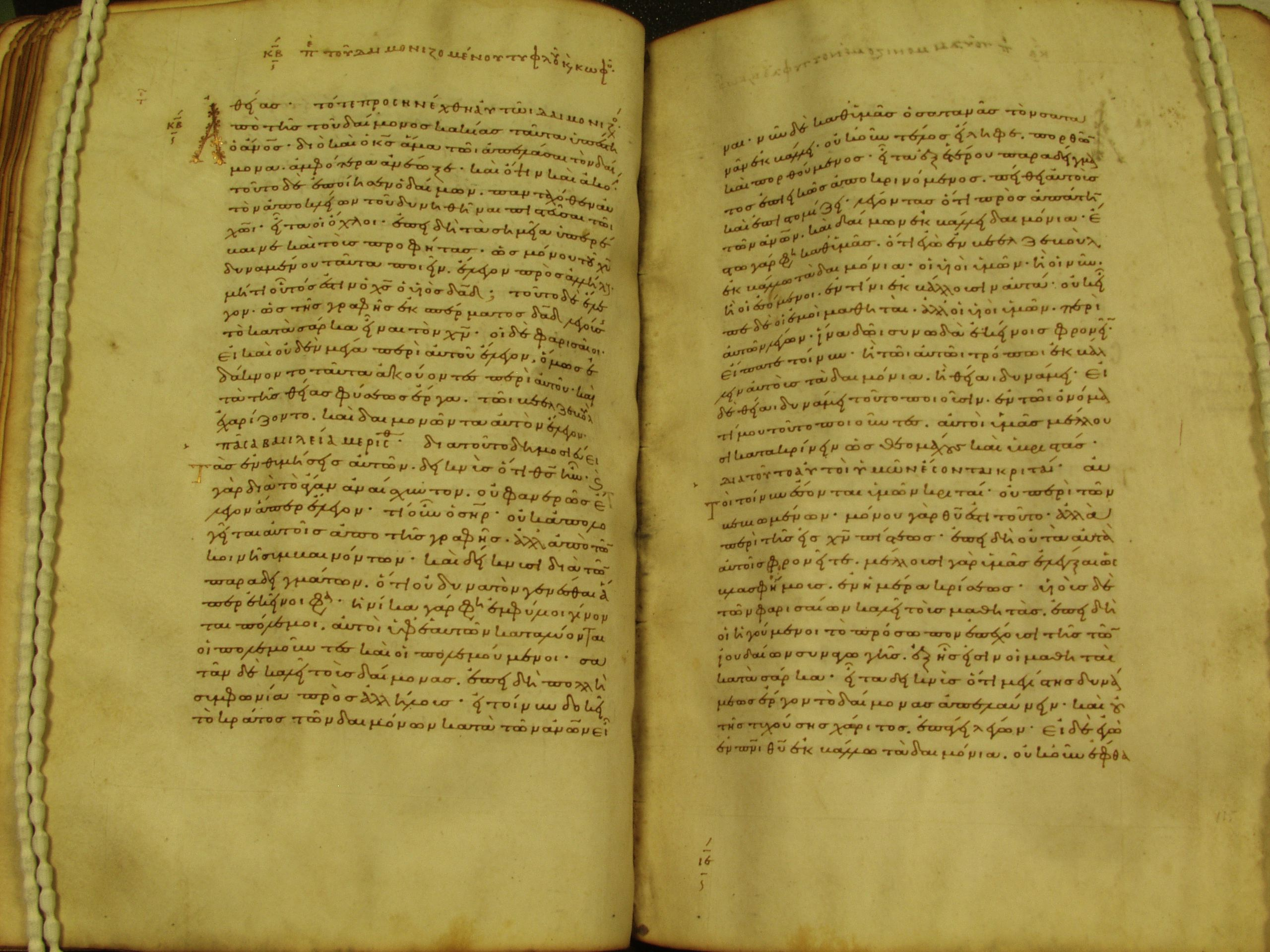
Folio 121 of Minuscule 2755

The codex contains a complete text of the four Gospels with a commentary. The text is written in one column per page, in 29 lines per page.

The text is divided according to the Ammonian sections with references to the Eusebian Canons.

Kurt Aland did not place it in any Category. It was not examined by the Claremont Profile Method.

The codex now is housed at Bible Museum Münster (Ms. 9).

== See also ==
- List of New Testament minuscules (2001–)
- Textual criticism
- Bible Museum Münster
