= List of New Testament minuscules (2601–2700) =

A New Testament minuscule is a copy of a portion of the New Testament written in a small, cursive Greek script (developed from Uncial).

== Legend ==
- The numbers (#) are the now standard system of Caspar René Gregory, often referred to as the Gregory-Aland numbers.
- Included among the cataloged minuscules are the following types of manuscripts, color coded:

Grey represents continuous text manuscripts containing only New Testament portions
Beige represents manuscripts with New Testament portions and a catena (quotations from church fathers)
Light cyan represents manuscripts of single-author commentaries who included the full Scripture text.
Light red represents manuscripts of single-author commentaries who included both the full Scripture text and a catena.
Light purple represents manuscripts of commentaries where the Scripture text was abridged.
White represents manuscript numbers no longer in use.

- Dates are estimated to the nearest 100 year increment where specific date is unknown.
- Content generally only describes sections of the New Testament: Gospels, The Acts of the Apostles (Acts), Pauline epistles, and so on. Sometimes the surviving portion of a codex is so limited that specific books, chapters or even verses can be indicated. Linked articles, where they exist, generally specify content in detail, by verse.
- Digital images are referenced with direct links to the hosting web pages, with the exception of those at the INTF. The quality and accessibility of the images is as follows:

Gold color indicates high resolution color images available online.
Tan color indicates high resolution color images available locally, not online.
Light tan color indicates only a small fraction of manuscript pages with color images available online.
Light gray color indicates black/white or microfilm images available online.
Light blue color indicates manuscript not imaged, and is currently lost or ownership unknown.
Light pink color indicates manuscript destroyed, presumed destroyed, or deemed too fragile to digitize.
Violet color indicates high resolution ultraviolet images available online.

† Indicates the manuscript has damaged or missing pages.
^{P} Indicates only a portion of the books were included.
^{K} Indicates manuscript also includes a commentary.
^{S} Indicates lost portions of manuscript replaced via supplement of a later hand.
^{abs} (abschrift) Indicates manuscript is copy.
[ ] Brackets around Gregory-Aland number indicate the manuscript belongs to an already numbered manuscript, was found to not be a continuous text manuscript, was found to be written in modern Greek versus Koine Greek, was proved a forgery, or has been destroyed.

== Minuscules 2601–2700 ==
#	Date	Contents	Pages	Institution and refs.	City, State	Country	Images
2601	12th	Luke†	1	Bodleian Library, MS. Auct. T. inf. 1. 4, fol. 133	Oxford	United Kingdom	INTF
[2602]=851							
2603	12th	Gospels	255	Chester Beatty Library, CBL W 134	Dublin	Ireland	CSNTM
2603	12th	Gospels	255	Chester Beatty Library, CBL W 134	Dublin	Ireland	INTF
2604	12th	Gospels	378	Chester Beatty Library, CBL W 139	Dublin	Ireland	CSNTM
2604	12th	Gospels	378	Chester Beatty Library, CBL W 139	Dublin	Ireland	INTF
2605	13th	Gospels	176	Chester Beatty Library, CBL W 140	Dublin	Ireland	CSNTM
2606	13th	Gospels	119	Chester Beatty Library, CBL W 141	Dublin	Ireland	CSNTM
2606	13th	Gospels	119	Chester Beatty Library, CBL W 141	Dublin	Ireland	INTF
2607	13th	Matthew† 14:34-15:28, 27:45-28:20; Mark 1:1-14:51† Luke 1:1-2:20†	47	Houghton Library, Harvard University, MS Gr 22	Cambridge, MA	United States	HL
2607	13th	Matthew† 14:34-15:28, 27:45-28:20; Mark 1:1-14:51† Luke 1:1-2:20†	47	Houghton Library, Harvard University, MS Gr 22	Cambridge, MA	United States	INTF
2608	13th	Gospels†	340	The University of Chicago Library, Ms. 202	Chicago, IL	United States	TUOCL
2608	13th	Gospels†	340	The University of Chicago Library, Ms. 202	Chicago, IL	United States	INTF
[2609]=2474							
2610	13th	Gospels †	117	The University of Chicago Library, Ms. 62	Chicago, IL	United States	TUOCL
2610	13th	Gospels †	117	The University of Chicago Library, Ms. 62	Chicago, IL	United States	INTF
[2611]=677							
2612	13th	Mark, Luke, John, Matthew	184	Duke University, Gk MS 5	Durham	United States	INTF
2613	11th	Gospels	321	Duke University, Gk MS 6	Durham	United States	DU
2613	11th	Gospels	321	Duke University, Gk MS 6	Durham	United States	INTF
2614	13th	Gospels†	272	Duke University, Gk MS 7	Durham	United States	DU
2615	12th	Gospels	248	Duke University, Gk MS 15	Durham	United States	DU
2615	12th	Gospels	248	Duke University, Gk MS 15	Durham	United States	INTF
2616	12th	Gospels	280	Duke University, Gk MS 16	Durham	United States	DU
[2617]=2491							
[2618]=927							
2619	17th	Acts†, Pauline Epistles†	96	Yale University Library, Beinecke MS 246	New Haven, CT	United States	YUL
2619	17th	Acts†, Pauline Epistles†	96	Yale University Library, Beinecke MS 246	New Haven, CT	United States	CSNTM
2620	13th	Gospels	258	Yale University Library, Beinecke MS 308	New Haven, CT	United States	INTF
2621	1380	Gospels	177	Princeton University Art Museum, 57-19	Princeton, NJ	United States	PUAM
2622	12th	Gospels	126	Austrian National Library, Suppl. gr. 164	Vienna	Austria	INTF
2623	11th	Gospels	262	National Library, 1	Ochrid	North Macedonia	INTF
2624	13th	Gospels	389	National Library, 2	Ochrid	North Macedonia	INTF
2625	12th	Acts†, General Epistles†, Pauline Epistles†, Revelation†	290	National Library, 13	Ochrid	North Macedonia	INTF
2626	14th	Acts†, General Epistles†, Pauline Epistles†, Revelation 1:1-18:3†	178	National Library, 14	Ochrid	North Macedonia	INTF
2627	13th	Acts†, General Epistles†, Pauline Epistles†	97	National Library, 15	Ochrid	North Macedonia	INTF
[2628]=ℓ2127							
2629	14th	1 Corinthians - Hebrews†	74	National Library, 18, fol. 1-74	Ochrid	North Macedonia	INTF
2630	16th	Gospels †	198	Panachrantos Monastery, 43	Andros	Greece	
2631	13th	Mark†	28	S. Loberdos (Private Collection), 2	Athens	Greece	INTF
2632	12th	John†	32	S. Loberdos (Private Collection), 3	Athens	Greece	INTF
2633	13th	Gospels†	232	S. Loberdos (Private Collection), 4	Athens	Greece	INTF
2634	14th	Gospels	187	S. Loberdos (Private Collection), 5	Athens	Greece	INTF
2635	1568	Gospels	291	S. Loberdos (Private Collection), 10	Athens	Greece	INTF
2636	16th	Matthew†, John†	286	S. Loberdos (Private Collection), 13	Athens	Greece	INTF
2637	11th	Gospels	356	S. Loberdos (Private Collection), 63	Athens	Greece	INTF
2638	14th	Commentary on Revelation 1:1-15:7†	19	Great Lavra Monastery, H' 205, fol. 119-137	Mount Athos	Greece	INTF
2639	13th	Ephesians† 4:9-25; Philippians† 1:14-2:2	3	E. Anemis, 2, Einband	Patmos	Greece	INTF
[2640]=2108							
2641	14th	Gospels†	243	University of California, Davis, BS2551 A4 no. 2641	Davis, California	United States	UC-B
2642	11th	Gospels†	253	University of California, Davis, BS2551 A4 no. 2642	Davis, California	United States	UC-B
2643	13th	Gospels, Revelation	181	University of California, Riverside	Riverside, CA	United States	INTF
2644	13th	Gospels†	184	University of California, BS2551 A2 1100z	Santa Barbara, CA	United States	
2645	13th	Gospels †	147	Giromeri Monastery	Epirus	Greece	INTF
2645	13th	Gospels †	154	John Rylands University Library, Gr. Ms. 21	Manchester	United Kingdom	INTF
2646	13th	Zigabenus Commentary on the Gospels†	319	Christ Church, Wake 51	Oxford	United Kingdom	INTF
2647	13th	Gospels†	329	Panagia Hozoviotissa Monastery, 1	Amorgos	Greece	INTF
2648	15th	Revelation 19:11-21:9†	2	Zoodochos Pigi Monastery (Hagias), 43, fol. 243-244	Andros	Greece	INTF
2649	1108	Gospels	254	Byzantine and Christian Museum, 204	Athens	Greece	INTF
2650	12th	Gospels †	187	Byzantine and Christian Museum, 227	Athens	Greece	INTF
2650	12th	Gospels †	187	Byzantine and Christian Museum, 227	Athens	Greece	CSNTM
2651	1315	Gospels †	85	Gennadius Library, Ms. 1.6	Athens	Greece	CSNTM, INTF
2652	15th	Acts, General Epistles, Pauline Epistles	199	National Library, 103	Athens	Greece	CSNTM
2653	15th	Gospels †, Acts†, General Epistles†, Pauline Epistles†	295	National Library, 2925	Athens	Greece	CSNTM
2654	14th	Luke†	1	National Library, 2925, fol. 90	Athens	Greece	CSNTM
2655	11th	Luke†	6	National Library, 2925, fol. 91.92.99-102	Athens	Greece	CSNTM
2656	17th	Gospels, Revelation	316	National Library, 3110	Athens	Greece	CSNTM
2657	12th	Mark†	2	Athens University History Museum, 34	Athens	Greece	AU
2657	12th	Mark†	2	Athens University History Museum, 34	Athens	Greece	INTF
2658	13th	Gospels†	216	Benaki Museum, MS TA 320	Athens	Greece	CSNTM, INTF
2659	16th	Theophylact Commentary on the Pauline Epistles	310	Benaki Museum, MS 8	Athens	Greece	CSNTM, INTF
2660	13th	Gospels	309	Benaki Museum, MS 45	Athens	Greece	CSNTM, INTF
2661	11th	Gospels†	157	Benaki Museum, MS 47	Athens	Greece	CSNTM, INTF
2662	12th	Matthew†	1	Vatopedi Monastery, 1213, fol. 82	Mount Athos	Greece	INTF
2663	16th	Revelation	30	Dionysiou Monastery, 148, fol. 71-100	Mount Athos	Greece	
2664	17th	Revelation	41	Dionysiou Monastery, fol. 53-93	Mount Athos	Greece	
2665	1274	Gospels	112	Docheiariou Monastery, 10	Mount Athos	Greece	INTF
2666	14th	Gospels†	122	Docheiariou Monastery, 58	Mount Athos	Greece	INTF
2667	16th	Revelation	18	Koutloumousiou Monastery, 165, fol. 267-284	Mount Athos	Greece	INTF
2668	14th	Zigabenus Commentary on Ephesians†	8	Great Lavra Monastery, K' 84, fol. 304-311	Mount Athos	Greece	INTF
2669	16th	Revelation	39	Great Lavra Monastery, L' 74, fol. 331-369	Mount Athos	Greece	INTF
2670	13th	Gospels †	260	Great Lavra Monastery, M' 1	Mount Athos	Greece	INTF
2671	12th	Acts†	1	St. Panteleimon Monastery, 98,4	Mount Athos	Greece	INTF
2672	15th	Revelation	35	St. Panteleimon Monastery, 479, fol. 246-280	Mount Athos	Greece	INTF
2673	15th	Gospels	207	Village Library, 159	Dimitsana	Greece	INTF
2674	1651	Acts, General Epistles, Pauline Epistles	158	Monastery of Olympiotissa, 7	Elassona	Greece	INTF
2675	14th	Acts†, General Epistles†, Pauline Epistles†	306	Archaeological Museum, 5	Almyros	Greece	INTF
2676	13th	Gospels	298	Archaeological Museum, 44	Ioannina	Greece	CSNTM
2676	13th	Gospels	298	Archaeological Museum, 44	Ioannina	Greece	INTF
2677	13th	Luke†	10	Katerini	Ioannina	Greece	INTF
2678	13th	Gospels†	176	Jakovatos	Lixouri, Cephalonia	Greece	INTF
2679	15th	Gospels†	159	Hagiassos Panagias, 11, fol. 3-161	Lesbos	Greece	INTF
2680	13th	Gospels	332	Hagiassos Panagias, 12	Lesbos	Greece	INTF
2681	17th	Revelation	55	Leimonos Monastery, Ms. Lesbiacus Leimonos 219, fol. 64-118	Kalloni, Lesbos	Greece	INTF
2682	13th	John†	8	Leimonos Monastery, Ms. Lesbiacus Leimonos 360	Kalloni, Lesbos	Greece	LM
2682	13th	John†	8	Leimonos Monastery, Ms. Lesbiacus Leimonos 360	Kalloni, Lesbos	Greece	INTF
2683	13th	Gospels†	198	Monastery of Varlaam, 1	Meteora	Greece	INTF
2684	11th	Gospels	254	Monastery of Varlaam, 2	Meteora	Greece	INTF
2685	15th	Gospels, Romans, Hebrews	313	Monastery of Varlaam, 3	Meteora	Greece	INTF
2686	15th	Gospels†	152	Monastery of Varlaam, 4	Meteora	Greece	INTF
2687	12th	Gospels	198	Monastery of Varlaam, Skevophylakion 27	Meteora	Greece	INTF
2687	12th	Gospels	1	National Library of Russia, Gr. 301	Saint Petersburg	Russia	INTF
2688	13th	Gospels	168	Monastery of Varlaam, Skevophylakion 35	Meteora	Greece	INTF
2689	14th	Gospels	265	Great Meteoron Monastery, 35	Meteora	Greece	INTF
2690	16th	Zigabenus Commentary on the Pauline Epistles†	283	Great Meteoron Monastery, 65	Meteora	Greece	INTF
2691	15th	Gospels, Acts, Pauline Epistles, General Epistles	342	Great Meteoron Monastery, 114	Meteora	Greece	INTF
2692	15th	Gospels	356	Great Meteoron Monastery, 236	Meteora	Greece	INTF
2693	11th	Gospels†^{s}	234	Great Meteoron Monastery, 245	Meteora	Greece	INTF
2694	12th	Gospels	283	Great Meteoron Monastery, 253	Meteora	Greece	INTF
2695	12th	Gospels	216	Great Meteoron Monastery, 255	Meteora	Greece	INTF
2696	13th	Acts, General Epistles, Pauline Epistles	220	Great Meteoron Monastery, 302	Meteora	Greece	INTF
2697	13th	Gospels †	72	Great Meteoron Monastery, 392, 64 fol., 629, 8 fol.	Meteora	Greece	INTF
2698	14th	Romans 1:5-3:17	9	Great Meteoron Monastery, 503	Meteora	Greece	INTF
2699	13th	Matthew†, Mark†	40	Great Meteoron Monastery, 506	Meteora	Greece	INTF
2700	12th	1 Corinthians†	2	Great Meteoron Monastery, 525	Meteora	Greece	INTF

[top]

== See also ==
- List of New Testament papyri
- List of New Testament uncials
- List of New Testament minuscules (1–1000)
- List of New Testament minuscules (1001–2000)
- List of New Testament minuscules (2001–)
- List of New Testament minuscules ordered by Location/Institution
- List of New Testament lectionaries

== Bibliography ==
- Aland, Kurt; M. Welte; B. Köster; K. Junack (1994). Kurzgefasste Liste der griechischen Handschriften des Neues Testaments. Berlin, New York: Walter de Gruyter. p. 95. ISBN 3-11-011986-2.
- "Liste Handschriften". Münster: Institute for New Testament Textual Research.
