= List of New Testament minuscules (1801–1900) =

A New Testament minuscule is a copy of a portion of the New Testament written in a small, cursive Greek script (developed from Uncial).

== Legend ==
- The numbers (#) are the now standard system of Caspar René Gregory, often referred to as the Gregory-Aland numbers.
- Included among the cataloged minuscules are the following types of manuscripts, color coded:

Grey represents continuous text manuscripts containing only New Testament portions
Beige represents manuscripts with New Testament portions and a catena (quotations from church fathers)
Light cyan represents manuscripts of single-author commentaries who included the full Scripture text.
Light red represents manuscripts of single-author commentaries who included both the full Scripture text and a catena.
Light purple represents manuscripts of commentaries where the Scripture text was abridged.
White represents manuscript numbers no longer in use.

- Dates are estimated to the nearest 100 year increment where specific date is unknown.
- Content generally only describes sections of the New Testament: Gospels, The Acts of the Apostles (Acts), Pauline epistles, and so on. Sometimes the surviving portion of a codex is so limited that specific books, chapters or even verses can be indicated. Linked articles, where they exist, generally specify content in detail, by verse.
- Digital images are referenced with direct links to the hosting web pages, with the exception of those at the INTF. The quality and accessibility of the images is as follows:

Gold color indicates high resolution color images available online.
Tan color indicates high resolution color images available locally, not online.
Light tan color indicates only a small fraction of manuscript pages with color images available online.
Light gray color indicates black/white or microfilm images available online.
Light blue color indicates manuscript not imaged, and is currently lost or ownership unknown.
Light pink color indicates manuscript destroyed, presumed destroyed, or deemed too fragile to digitize.
Violet color indicates high resolution ultraviolet images available online.

† Indicates the manuscript has damaged or missing pages.
^{P} Indicates only a portion of the books were included.
^{K} Indicates manuscript also includes a commentary.
^{S} Indicates lost portions of manuscript replaced via supplement of a later hand.
^{abs} (abschrift) Indicates manuscript is copy.
[ ] Brackets around Gregory-Aland number indicate the manuscript belongs to an already numbered manuscript, was found to not be a continuous text manuscript, was found to be written in modern Greek versus Koine Greek, was proved a forgery, or has been destroyed.

== Minuscules 1801-1900 ==
#	Date	Contents	Pages	Institution and refs.	City, State	Country	Images
1801	11th	Gospels†	248	Owner unknown, formerly: Trapezunt, Sumela 1			
1802 = 2335	1668	Gospels	438	Archaeological Museum, 7	Ankara	Turkey	INTF
1803	12th	Gospels†	304	Archaeological Museum, 470, 1	Ankara	Turkey	INTF
1804	12th	Gospels†	336	Archaeological Museum, 470, 5	Ankara	Turkey	INTF
1805	12th	Gospels	188	Owner unknown, formerly: Trapezunt, Sumela, 21			
1806	14th	Revelation	44	Owner unknown, formerly: Trapezunt, Sumela 41			
1807	12th	Gospels	194	Gennadius Library, 259	Athens	Greece	CSNTM, INTF
1808	13th	Gospels	213	Museum Hagia Sophia, 11664	Istanbul	Turkey	INTF
1809	14th	Acts†, General Epistles†, Pauline Epistles†	117	Owner unknown, formerly: Trapezunt, Sumela, 56			
1810	11th	Gospels	324	Owner unknown, formerly: Trapezunt, Sumela 61			
1811	11th	Gospels†	266	Owner unknown, formerly: Trapezunt, Sumela 74			
1812	11th	Gospels	219	Byzantine and Christian Museum, 147a	Athens	Greece	
1813	12th	Gospels	235	Duke University, Gk MS 25	Durham, NC	USA	DU
1813	12th	Gospels	235	Duke University, Gk MS 25	Durham, NC	USA	INTF
1814	15th	Gospels†	487	Braidense National Library, AF. XIV. 15	Milan	Italy	INTF
[1815] = 2127							
1816	10th	Gospels	202	Queriniana Library, A. VI. 26	Brescia	Italy	INTF
1817	11th	Chrysostom Commentary on Galatians through Colossians	283	Vatican Library, Vat.gr.551	Vatican City	Vatican City	INTF
1818	12th	Chrysostom Commentary on Hebrews	155	Vatican Library, Vat.gr.552	Vatican City	Vatican City	DVL, INTF
1819	15th	Cyril Commentary on John†	355	Vatican Library, Vat.gr.592	Vatican City	Vatican City	INTF
1820	15th	Cyril Commentary on John	296	Vatican Library, Vat.gr.593	Vatican City	Vatican City	INTF
1821	1117	Luke (Nicetas Catena)	320	Vatican Library, Vat.gr.1611	Vatican City	Vatican City	DVL
1821	1117	Luke (Nicetas Catena)	320	Vatican Library, Vat.gr.1611	Vatican City	Vatican City	INTF
1822	12th	Luke (Nicetas Catena)	295	Vatican Library, Vat.gr.1642	Vatican City	Vatican City	DVL, INTF
1823	15th	Gospel of Matthew† 2:6-28:20, Mark, Luke, John	366	Vatican Library, Vat.gr.2316	Vatican City	Vatican City	INTF
1824	17th	Revelation^{K}	184	The Vatican Library, Ott.gr.126, fol. 544-642; Ott.gr.127, fol. 1-85	Vatican City	Vatican City	DVL,
1824	17th	Revelation^{K}	184	The Vatican Library, Ott.gr.126, fol. 544-642; Ott.gr.127, fol. 1-85	Vatican City	Vatican City	INTF
[1825]							
1826	12th	Matthew† 20:19-26:59, Luke^{P} 22:43-45, John^{P} 13:3-17	24	Lutheran School of Theology at Chicago, Gruber 122	Maywood, IL	USA	CSNTM
1826	12th	Matthew† 26:59-28:20, Mark 1:1-16:6†	57	Russian National Academy of Sciences Library, K'pel 79	Saint Petersburg	Russia	INTF
1827	1295	Acts† 1:16-28:31, General Epistles, Pauline Epistles†	195	National Library, 131	Athens	Greece	CSNTM
1827	1295	Acts† 1:16-28:31, General Epistles, Pauline Epistles†	195	National Library, 131	Athens	Greece	INTF
1828	11th	Acts, General Epistles, Pauline Epistles, Revelation 1:1-18:22†	327	National Library, 91	Athens	Greece	CSNTM
1828	11th	Acts, General Epistles, Pauline Epistles, Revelation 1:1-18:22†	327	National Library, 91	Athens	Greece	INTF
1829	10th	Acts^{S}†, General Epistles	86	National Library, 105	Athens	Greece	CSNTM
1829	10th	Acts^{S}†, General Epistles	86	National Library, 105	Athens	Greece	INTF
1830	15th	Acts, General Epistles, Pauline Epistles	224	National Library, 129	Athens	Greece	CSNTM
1830	15th	Acts, General Epistles, Pauline Epistles	224	National Library, 129	Athens	Greece	INTF
1831	14th	Acts, General Epistles†, Pauline Epistles†	356	National Library, 119	Athens	Greece	CSNTM
1831	14th	Acts, General Epistles†, Pauline Epistles†	356	National Library, 119	Athens	Greece	INTF
1832	14th	Acts† 7:35-28:31, General Epistles†, Pauline Epistles†	220	National Library, 89	Athens	Greece	CSNTM
1832	14th	Acts† 7:35-28:31, General Epistles†, Pauline Epistles†	220	National Library, 89	Athens	Greece	INTF
[1833]	1580	Acts		Burnt. Formerly: Zakynthos, Stadtbibl., Katrames 10			
1834	1301	Acts, Pauline epistles, General Epistles	327	National Library of Russia, Gr. 225	Saint Petersburg	Russia	
1835	11th	Revelation†	30	Royal Site of San Lorenzo de El Escorial, T. III. 17, fol. 159-174.177-189	San Lorenzo de El Escorial	Spain	INTF
1835	11th	Acts†, General Epistles†	63	National Library, 4588	Madrid	Spain	BDH
1836	10th	1 John^{P}† - 2 Thessalonians^{P}†	139	Exarchist Monastery of Saint Mary, A. b. 1	Grottaferrata	Italy	INTF
1837	10th	Acts, General Epistles, Pauline Epistles	181	Exarchist Monastery of Saint Mary, A. b. 3	Grottaferrata	Italy	INTF
1838	11th	Acts, General Epistles, Pauline Epistles†	193	Exarchist Monastery of Saint Mary, A. b. 6	Grottaferrata	Italy	INTF
1839	13th	Commentary on Acts†, General Epistles†, Pauline Epistles†	224	University Library, 40	Messina	Italy	INTF
1840	16th	Zigabenus Commentary on General Epistles, Pauline Epistles	456	Casanata Library, 1395	Rome	Italy	INTF
1841	9th/10th	Acts†, General Epistles†, Pauline Epistles†, Revelation†	204	Leimonos Monastery, Ms. Lesbiacus Leimonos 55	Kalloni, Lesbos	Greece	LM
1841	9th/10th	Acts†, General Epistles†, Pauline Epistles†, Revelation†	204	Leimonos Monastery, Ms. Lesbiacus Leimonos 55	Kalloni, Lesbos	Greece	INTF
1842	13th/14th	Acts, General Epistles	105	Vatican Library, Vat.gr.652	Vatican City	Vatican City	DVL, INTF
1843	13th	Acts, General Epistles, Pauline Epistles	398	Vatican Library, Vat.gr.1208	Vatican City	Vatican City	DVL
1843	13th	Acts, General Epistles, Pauline Epistles	398	Vatican Library, Vat.gr.1208	Vatican City	Vatican City	INTF
1844	16th	1 John - Jude	50	Vatican Library, Vat.gr.1227, fol. 256-305	Vatican City	Vatican City	INTF
1845	10th	Acts, General Epistles, Pauline Epistles	247	Vatican Library, Vat.gr.1971	Vatican City	Vatican City	DVL, INTF
1846	11th	Acts†, General Epistles†, Pauline Epistles†	125	Vatican Library, Vat.gr.2099	Vatican City	Vatican City	INTF
1847	11th	Acts, General Epistles, Pauline Epistles	351	Vatican Library, Pal.gr.38	Vatican City	Vatican City	HU
1847	11th	Acts, General Epistles, Pauline Epistles	351	Vatican Library, Pal.gr.38	Vatican City	Vatican City	INTF
1848	15th	Acts, General Epistles, Pauline Epistles^{P}	268	National Library, Grec 108, Grec 109, Grec 110, Grec 111	Paris	France	BnF, INTF
1848	15th	Acts, General Epistles, Pauline Epistles^{P}	39	Vatican Library, Reg.gr.76	Vatican City	Vatican City	INTF
1849	1069	Acts, General Epistles, Pauline Epistles, Revelation	286	Marciana National Library, Gr. II,114 (1107)	Venice	Italy	INTF
1850	12th	Acts, General Epistles, Pauline Epistles	147	Cambridge University Library, Add. Mss. 6678	Cambridge	UK	INTF
1851	10th	Acts†, General Epistles†, Pauline Epistles†	229	Linköping Diocesan Library, T. 14	Linköping	Sweden	LDL
1851	10th	Acts†, General Epistles†, Pauline Epistles†	229	Linköping Diocesan Library, T. 14	Linköping	Sweden	INTF
1852	13th	Acts† 9:33-28:31, General Epistles†, Pauline Epistles†, Revelation	182	Uppsala University, Gr. 11	Uppsala	Sweden	UU
1852	13th	Acts† 9:33-28:31, General Epistles†, Pauline Epistles†, Revelation	182	Uppsala University, Gr. 11	Uppsala	Sweden	INTF
1853	12th	Acts, General Epistles, Pauline Epistles	227	Esphigmenou Monastery, 68	Mount Athos	Greece	INTF
1854	11th	Acts, General Epistles, Pauline Epistles, Revelation	319	Iviron Monastery, 25	Mount Athos	Greece	INTF
1855	13th	Acts, General Epistles, Pauline Epistles	209	Iviron Monastery,37	Mount Athos	Greece	INTF
1856	14th	Acts†, General Epistles†, Pauline Epistles†	180	Iviron Monastery,57	Mount Athos	Greece	INTF
1857	13th	Acts, General Epistles, Pauline Epistles, Revelation	198	Iviron Monastery, 60, fol. 1-198	Mount Athos	Greece	INTF
1858	13th	Acts†, General Epistles†, Pauline Epistles†	152	Konstamonitou Monastery, 108	Mount Athos	Greece	INTF
1858	13th	Acts†, General Epistles†, Pauline Epistles†	16	Library of the Russian Academy of Sciences, Dmitr. 33	Saint Petersburg	Russia	INTF
1859	14th	Acts, General Epistles, Revelation (no commentary)	145	Koutloumousiou Monastery, 82	Mount Athos	Greece	INTF
1860	13th	Acts, General Epistles, Pauline Epistles	329	Koutloumousiou Monastery, 83	Mount Athos	Greece	INTF
1861	16th	Acts†, General Epistles†, Pauline Epistles†	206	Koutloumousiou Monastery, 275	Mount Athos	Greece	INTF
1862	9th/10th/11th	Acts, General Epistles, Pauline Epistles, Revelation	429	Agiou Pavlou Monastery, 2	Mount Athos	Greece	INTF
1862	9th/10th/11th	Acts, General Epistles, Pauline Epistles, Revelation	429	Agiou Pavlou Monastery, 2	Mount Athos	Greece	Elpenor
1863	12th	Acts, General Epistles, Pauline Epistles	205	Church of Protaton, 32	Mount Athos	Greece	INTF
1864	13th	Acts, General Epistles, Pauline Epistles, Revelation	144	Stavronikita Monastery, 52	Mount Athos	Greece	MAR
1865	13th	Acts, General Epistles, Pauline Epistles, Revelation	315	Philotheu Monastery, 38	Mount Athos	Greece	INTF
[1866] = ℓ 1591							
1867	12th	Acts†, General Epistles†, Pauline Epistles†	207	Griechisches Patriarchat, 117 (5)	Alexandria	Egypt	INTF
1868	12th	Acts, General Epistles, Pauline Epistles	289	Ecumenical Patriarchate, Triados 14 (16)	Istanbul	Turkey	INTF
1868	12th	Acts, General Epistles, Pauline Epistles	289	Ecumenical Patriarchate, Triados 14 (16)	Istanbul	Turkey	CSNTM
1869	1688	Acts, General Epistles, Pauline Epistles	191	Ecumenical Patriarchate, Theo. School of Chalki 9	Istanbul	Turkey	INTF
1869	1688	Acts, General Epistles, Pauline Epistles	191	Ecumenical Patriarchate, Theo. School of Chalki 9	Istanbul	Turkey	CSNTM
1870	11th	Acts, General Epistles, Revelation	298	Ecumenical Patriarchate, Theo. School of Chalki 9	Istanbul	Turkey	INTF
1870	11th	Acts, General Epistles, Revelation	298	Ecumenical Patriarchate, Theo. School of Chalki 9	Istanbul	Turkey	CSNTM
1871	10th	Acts† (no commentary), General Epistles†	215	Ecumenical Patriarchate, Theo. School of Chalki 9	Istanbul	Turkey	INTF
1871	10th	Acts† (no commentary), General Epistles†	215	Ecumenical Patriarchate, Theo. School of Chalki 9	Istanbul	Turkey	CSNTM
1872	12th	Acts, General Epistles, Revelation	233	Ecumenical Patriarchate, Theo. School of Chalki 9	Istanbul	Turkey	INTF
1872	12th	Acts, General Epistles, Revelation	233	Ecumenical Patriarchate, Theo. School of Chalki 9	Istanbul	Turkey	CSNTM
1873	13th	Acts, General Epistles, Pauline Epistles	379	Gennadius Library, MS 1.8	Athens	Greece	CSNTM, INTF
1874	10th	Acts, General Epistles, Pauline Epistles	191	Saint Catherine's Monastery, 273	Sinai	Egypt	INTF
1875	10th	Acts, General Epistles, Pauline Epistles†	181	National Library, 149	Athens	Greece	CSNTM
1875	10th	Acts, General Epistles, Pauline Epistles†	181	National Library, 149	Athens	Greece	INTF
1876	15th	Acts, General Epistles, Pauline Epistles, Revelation 1:1-21:27†	276	Saint Catherine's Monastery, Gr. 279	Sinai	Egypt	LOC, INTF, CSNTM
1877	14th	Acts, General Epistles, Pauline Epistles	321	Saint Catherine's Monastery, Gr. 280	Sinai	Egypt	LOC, INTF, CSNTM
1878	11th	Romans - 2 Corinthians	298	Saint Catherine's Monastery, Gr. 281	Sinai	Egypt	LOC, INTF, CSNTM
1879	11th	Galatians - Hebrews	357	Saint Catherine's Monastery, Gr. 282	Sinai	Egypt	LOC, INTF, CSNTM
1880	10th	Acts, General Epistles, Pauline Epistles†	241	Saint Catherine's Monastery, Gr. 283	Sinai	Egypt	LOC, INTF, CSNTM
1881	14th	Romans† - Hebrews†, 1 Peter† - Jude	126	Saint Catherine's Monastery, Gr. 300	Sinai	Egypt	LOC, INTF, CSNTM
1882	15th	Romans - Philemon, General Epistles	132	Sainte-Geneviève Library, 3399	Paris	France	INTF
1883	16th	Acts	97	Marciana National Library, Gr. II,61 (955), fol. 200-296	Venice	Italy	INTF
1884	16th	Acts	121	Gotha Research Library, Chart. B 1767	Gotha	Germany	INTF
1885	1101	Acts, General Epistles (no commentary), Pauline Epistles	396	National Library, Supplement Grec 1262	Paris	France	BnF, INTF
1885	1101	Acts, General Epistles (no commentary), Pauline Epistles	3	Russian National Library, Gr. 321	Saint Petersburg	Russia	
1886	14th	Acts, General Epistles, Pauline Epistles	292	National Library, Supplement Grec 1263	Paris	France	BnF, INTF
1887	12th	Acts	?	Panagia Hozoviotissa Monastery, 5?	Amorgos	Greece	
1888	11th	Acts, General Epistles, Pauline Epistles, Revelation	280	Patriarchate of Jerusalem, Taphos, 38	Jerusalem		LOC, INTF, CSNTM
1889	12th	Acts†, General Epistles†, Pauline Epistles†	140	Patriarchate of Jerusalem, Taphos, 43	Jerusalem		LOC, INTF, CSNTM
1890	14th	Acts†, General Epistles†, Pauline Epistles†	268	Patriarchate of Jerusalem, Taphos 462	Jerusalem		LOC, INTF, CSNTM
1891	10th	Acts, General Epistles, Pauline Epistles	233	Patriarchate of Jerusalem, Sabas, 107	Jerusalem		LOC, INTF, CSNTM
1892	14th	Acts, General Epistles, Pauline Epistles	280	Patriarchate of Jerusalem, Sabas, 204	Jerusalem		LOC, INTF, CSNTM
1893	12th	Acts†, General Epistles†, Pauline Epistles†, Revelation†	166	Patriarchate of Jerusalem, Sabas, 665	Jerusalem		LOC, INTF, CSNTM
1894	12th	Acts†, General Epistles, Pauline Epistles†	263	Patriarchate of Jerusalem, Sabas 676	Jerusalem		LOC, INTF, CSNTM
1895	9th	Acts†	349	Patriarchate of Jerusalem, Stavros 25	Jerusalem		LOC, INTF, CSNTM
1896	14th/15th	Acts, Pauline Epistles (without Galatians)†	274	Patriarchate of Jerusalem, Stavros 37	Jerusalem		LOC, INTF, CSNTM
1897	12th/13th	Acts, Pauline Epistles	186	Patriarchate of Jerusalem, Stavros 57	Jerusalem		LOC, INTF, CSNTM
[1898] = 1875							
1899	14th	Acts†, Pauline Epistles†	112	Monastery of Saint John the Theologian, 664	Patmos	Greece	INTF
1900	9th	Pauline Epistles†	270	Pantokratoros Monastery, 28	Mount Athos	Greece	INTF

[top]

== See also ==
- List of New Testament papyri
- List of New Testament uncials
- List of New Testament minuscules (1–1000)
- List of New Testament minuscules (1001–2000)
- List of New Testament minuscules (2001–)
- List of New Testament minuscules ordered by Location/Institution
- List of New Testament lectionaries

== Bibliography ==
- Aland, Kurt; M. Welte; B. Köster; K. Junack (1994). Kurzgefasste Liste der griechischen Handschriften des Neues Testaments. Berlin, New York: Walter de Gruyter. p. 95. ISBN 3-11-011986-2.
- "Liste Handschriften". Münster: Institute for New Testament Textual Research.
