= List of New Testament minuscules (1701–1800) =

A New Testament minuscule is a copy of a portion of the New Testament written in a small, cursive Greek script (developed from Uncial).

== Legend ==
- The numbers (#) are the now standard system of Caspar René Gregory, often referred to as the Gregory-Aland numbers.
- Included among the cataloged minuscules are the following types of manuscripts, color coded:

Grey represents continuous text manuscripts containing only New Testament portions
Beige represents manuscripts with New Testament portions and a catena (quotations from church fathers)
Light cyan represents manuscripts of single-author commentaries who included the full Scripture text.
Light red represents manuscripts of single-author commentaries who included both the full Scripture text and a catena.
Light purple represents manuscripts of commentaries where the Scripture text was abridged.
White represents manuscript numbers no longer in use.

- Dates are estimated to the nearest 100 year increment where specific date is unknown.
- Content generally only describes sections of the New Testament: Gospels, The Acts of the Apostles (Acts), Pauline epistles, and so on. Sometimes the surviving portion of a codex is so limited that specific books, chapters or even verses can be indicated. Linked articles, where they exist, generally specify content in detail, by verse.
- Digital images are referenced with direct links to the hosting web pages, with the exception of those at the INTF. The quality and accessibility of the images is as follows:

Gold color indicates high resolution color images available online.
Tan color indicates high resolution color images available locally, not online.
Light tan color indicates only a small fraction of manuscript pages with color images available online.
Light gray color indicates black/white or microfilm images available online.
Light blue color indicates manuscript not imaged, and is currently lost or ownership unknown.
Light pink color indicates manuscript destroyed, presumed destroyed, or deemed too fragile to digitize.
Violet color indicates high resolution ultraviolet images available online.

† Indicates the manuscript has damaged or missing pages.
^{P} Indicates only a portion of the books were included.
^{K} Indicates manuscript also includes a commentary.
^{S} Indicates lost portions of manuscript replaced via supplement of a later hand.
^{abs} (abschrift) Indicates manuscript is copy.
[ ] Brackets around Gregory-Aland number indicate the manuscript belongs to an already numbered manuscript, was found to not be a continuous text manuscript, was found to be written in modern Greek versus Koine Greek, was proved a forgery, or has been destroyed.

== Minuscules 1701-1800 ==
#	Date	Contents	Pages	Institution and refs.	City, State	Country	Images
1701	10th/11th	Gospels†	265	Yale University Library, Beinecke MS 150	New Haven, CT	USA	YUL, INTF
1701	10th/11th	Gospels†	265	Yale University Library, Beinecke MS 150	New Haven, CT	USA	CSNTM
1702	1560	Gospels, Acts, General Epistles, Pauline Epistles	314	Konstamonitou Monastery, 6	Mount Athos	Greece	INTF
1703	14th	Gospels	187	Koutloumousiou Monastery, 279	Mount Athos	Greece	INTF
1704	1541	New Testament	490	Koutloumousiou Monastery, 356	Mount Athos	Greece	INTF
1705	1400	Gospels	239	State Archive, Kod. Br 38	Tirana	Albania	CSNTM
1706	13th-16th	Acts? General Epistles?	411	State Archive, Koder-Trapp 18	Tirana	Albania	
1707	14th	Theophylact Commentary on Gospel of John	603	State Archive, Kod. Br 12	Tirana	Albania	CSNTM
1708	?	Gospels	250	Owner Unknown			
1709	12th	John^{P}	54	State Archive, Kod. Br 19, fol. 141-194	Tirana	Albania	CSNTM, INTF
[1710]=1142							
1711	1416	Gospels	149	Owner Unknown			
1712	15th	Gospels†	105	Leimonos Monastery, Ms. Lesbiacus Leimonos 141	Lesbos	Greece	LM
1713	15th	Gospels	251	Leimonos Monastery, Ms. Lesbiacus Leimonos 145	Lesbos	Greece	LM
1714	12th	Matthew, Mark, Luke	136	Leimonos Monastery, Ms. Lesbiacus Leimonos 227	Lesbos	Greece	LM
1715	12th	Gospels†	225	Leimonos Monastery, Skeuophylakion 2	Lesbos	Greece	
1716	12th/13th	Gospels	293	High School	Mytilene, Lesbos	Greece	
1717	13th	Acts, General Epistles, Pauline epistles	301	Vatopedi Monastery, 850	Mount Athos	Greece	INTF
1718	12th	Acts, General Epistles, Pauline epistles	124	Vatopedi Monastery, 851	Mount Athos	Greece	INTF
1719	1287	Acts, General Epistles, Pauline Epistles, Revelation	212	Vatopedi Monastery, 852	Mount Athos	Greece	INTF
1720	10th	Acts, General Epistles, Pauline Epistles	353	Vatopedi Monastery, 853	Mount Athos	Greece	INTF
1721	17th	Acts, General Epistles, Pauline Epistles	550	Vatopedi Monastery, 863	Mount Athos	Greece	INTF
1722	13th	Acts, General Epistles, Pauline Epistles	239	Vatopedi Monastery, 864	Mount Athos	Greece	INTF
1723	14th	Acts†, General Epistles†, Pauline Epistles†	269	Vatopedi Monastery, 858	Mount Athos	Greece	INTF
1724	11th/12th	Acts†, General Epistles†, Pauline Epistles†	143	Vatopedi Monastery, 865	Mount Athos	Greece	INTF
1725	1367	Acts, General Epistles, Pauline Epistles	229	Vatopedi Monastery, 859	Mount Athos	Greece	INTF
1726	14th	Acts†, General Epistles†, Pauline Epistles†	223	Vatopedi Monastery, 860	Mount Athos	Greece	INTF
1727	13th	Acts, General Epistles, Pauline Epistles	240	Vatopedi Monastery, 861	Mount Athos	Greece	INTF
1728	13th	Acts†, General Epistles†, Pauline Epistles†, Revelation†	134	Vatopedi Monastery, 862	Mount Athos	Greece	INTF
1729	15th	Acts†, General Epistles^{P}†, Pauline Epistles^{P}†	209	Vatopedi Monastery, 968	Mount Athos	Greece	INTF
1730	11th	Acts†, General Epistles^{P}†, Pauline Epistles^{P}†	222	Vatopedi Monastery, 972	Mount Athos	Greece	INTF
1731	13th	Acts†, General Epistles†, Pauline Epistles†	153	Vatopedi Monastery, 973	Mount Athos	Greece	INTF
1732	1384	Acts, General Epistles, Pauline Epistles, Revelation	193	Great Lavra Monastery, A' 91	Mount Athos	Greece	INTF
1733	14th	Acts, General Epistles, Pauline Epistles, Revelation	303	Great Lavra Monastery, B' 5	Mount Athos	Greece	INTF
1734	1015	Acts†, General Epistles†, Pauline Epistles†, Revelation	233	Great Lavra Monastery, B' 18	Mount Athos	Greece	INTF
1735	10th	Acts, General Epistles†, Pauline Epistles†	189	Great Lavra Monastery, B' 42	Mount Athos	Greece	INTF
1736	13th	Acts, General Epistles, Pauline Epistles	237	Great Lavra Monastery, B' 45	Mount Athos	Greece	INTF
1737	12th	Acts, General Epistles, Pauline Epistles	271	Great Lavra Monastery, B' 56	Mount Athos	Greece	INTF
1738	11th	Acts†, General Epistles^{P}†, Pauline Epistles^{P}†	164	Great Lavra Monastery, B' 61	Mount Athos	Greece	INTF
1739	10th	Acts, General Epistles, Pauline Epistles	102	Great Lavra Monastery, B' 184	Mount Athos	Greece	INTF
1740	12th	Acts, General Epistles, Pauline Epistles, Revelation	307	Great Lavra Monastery, B' 80	Mount Athos	Greece	INTF
1741	14th	Acts†, General Epistles†, Pauline Epistles†	220	Great Lavra Monastery, G' 57	Mount Athos	Greece	INTF
1742	13th	Acts, General Epistles, Pauline epistles	259	Great Lavra Monastery, G' 75	Mount Athos	Greece	INTF
1743	12th	Acts, General Epistles, Pauline epistles	221	Great Lavra Monastery, G' 78	Mount Athos	Greece	INTF
1744	14th + 16th	Acts†, General Epistles†, Pauline epistles†	269	Great Lavra Monastery, W' 8	Mount Athos	Greece	INTF
1745	15th	Acts†, General Epistles†, Pauline Epistles†, Revelation	237	Great Lavra Monastery, W' 49	Mount Athos	Greece	INTF
1746	14th	Acts, General Epistles, Pauline Epistles, Revelation	248	Great Lavra Monastery, W' 114	Mount Athos	Greece	INTF
1747	14th	Acts†, General Epistles^{P}†, Pauline Epistles^{P}†	210	Great Lavra Monastery, W' 128	Mount Athos	Greece	INTF
1748	1662	Acts, General Epistles, Pauline epistles	234	Great Lavra Monastery, W' 131	Mount Athos	Greece	INTF
1749	16th	Acts, General Epistles, Pauline epistles	362	Great Lavra Monastery, W' 137	Mount Athos	Greece	INTF
1750	15th	Acts, General Epistles, Pauline epistles	298	Great Lavra Monastery, L' 118	Mount Athos	Greece	INTF
1751	1479	Acts, General Epistles, Pauline epistles	168	Great Lavra Monastery, K' 190, fol. 1-168	Mount Athos	Greece	INTF
1752	12th	Acts†, General Epistles†, Pauline Epistles†	306	St. Panteleimon Monastery, 24	Mount Athos	Greece	INTF
1753	14th	Acts, General Epistles, Pauline epistles	324	St. Panteleimon Monastery, 66	Mount Athos	Greece	INTF
1754	12th	Acts†, General Epistles†, Pauline Epistles†	239	St. Panteleimon Monastery, 68	Mount Athos	Greece	INTF
1755	11th	2 Timothy†, Titus, Philemon†	4	St. Panteleimon Monastery, 98,1	Mount Athos	Greece	INTF
1756	10th	Acts†, Pauline epistles^{P}†	25	St. Panteleimon Monastery, 99,1	Mount Athos	Greece	INTF
1757	15th	Acts†, General Epistles†, Pauline Epistles†, Revelation†	183	Leimonos Monastery, Ms. Lesbiacus Leimonos 132	Kalloni, Lesbos	Greece	LM
1757	15th	Acts†, General Epistles†, Pauline Epistles†, Revelation†	183	Leimonos Monastery, Ms. Lesbiacus Leimonos 132	Kalloni, Lesbos	Greece	INTF
1758	13th	Acts†, General Epistles†, Pauline Epistles†	205	Leimonos Monastery, Ms. Lesbiacus Leimonos 195	Kalloni, Lesbos	Greece	LM
1758	13th	Acts†, General Epistles†, Pauline Epistles†	205	Leimonos Monastery, Ms. Lesbiacus Leimonos 195	Kalloni, Lesbos	Greece	INTF
1759	13th	Acts†, General Epistles†, Pauline Epistles†	252	Vlatades Monastery, 68 (32)	Thessaloniki	Greece	INTF
1760	12th	Acts†, General Epistles†, Pauline Epistles†, Revelation†	381	Center for Slavic and Byzantine Studies, 176 (Serres, Prodromu, gæ 23)	Sofia	Bulgaria	INTF
1761	14th	Acts, General Epistles, Pauline Epistles	250	National Library 2521	Athens	Greece	CSNTM
1762	14th	Acts†, General Epistles†, Pauline Epistles^{P}†	175	National Library 2489	Athens	Greece	CSNTM
1763	15th	Acts†, General Epistles†, Pauline Epistles†	277	National Library 2450	Athens	Greece	CSNTM
1764	12th	Acts	99	National Archives of Albania Kod. Br. 17	Tirana	Albania	CSNTM, INTF
1765	14th	Acts, General Epistles, Pauline Epistles	252	British Library Add MS 33214	London	UK	BL
1765	14th	Acts, General Epistles, Pauline Epistles	252	British Library Add MS 33214	London	UK	INTF
1766	1344	Acts, General Epistles, Pauline Epistles	104	Center for Slavic and Byzantine Studies, 279 (Looted from Kosinitza Monastery in 1917)	Sofia	Bulgaria	INTF
1767	15th	Acts†, General Epistles†, Pauline Epistles†	237	Iviron Monastery, 642	Mount Athos	Greece	INTF
1768	1519	Acts, General Epistles, Pauline Epistles	249	Iviron Monastery, 643	Mount Athos	Greece	INTF
1769	14th	1 Corinthians† – Revelation†	209	Iviron Monastery, 648	Mount Athos	Greece	INTF
1770	11th	Pauline epistles^{P}†	93	Great Lavra Monastery, Γ' 63	Mount Athos	Greece	INTF
1771	14th	1 Corinthians† 14:36-15:58—Hebrews, Revelation	105	Great Lavra Monastery, E' 177	Mount Athos	Greece	INTF
1772	14th	2 Corinthians† – Hebrews†	141	Great Lavra Monastery, L' 172	Mount Athos	Greece	INTF
1773	14th	Revelation	188	Vatopedi Monastery, 17	Mount Athos	Greece	INTF
1774	15th	Revelation†	13	Great Lavra Monastery, Q' 187, fol. 1-13	Mount Athos	Greece	INTF
1775	1847	Revelation	275	St. Panteleimon Monastery, 110	Mount Athos	Greece	INTF
[1776]	1791	Revelation copied from printed edition.	410	St. Panteleimon Monastery, 71	Mount Athos	Greece	INTF
1777	19th	Revelation†	68	St. Panteleimon Monastery, 23	Mount Athos	Greece	INTF
1778	15th	Revelation† 1:9-22:21	177	Vlatades Monastery, 35	Thessaloniki	Greece	INTF
1779	1344	Gospels	134	Center for Slavic and Byzantine Studies, 217 (Looted from Kosinitza Monastery in 1917)	Sofia	Bulgaria	INTF
1780	c. 1200	Partial Theophylact Commentary New Testament	198	Duke University, KW Clark, Gk Ms 1	Durham, NC	USA	DU
1780	c. 1200	Partial Theophylact Commentary New Testament	198	Duke University, KW Clark, Gk Ms 1	Durham, NC	USA	INTF
1781	11th + 12th	Gospels	219	Center for Slavic and Byzantine Studies, 252 (Looted from Kosinitza Monastery in 1917)	Sofia	Bulgaria	INTF
1782	14th	Gospels	326	Owner unknown, (Looted from Kosinitza Monastery in 1917)			
1783	14th	Gospels	227	Center for Slavic and Byzantine Studies, 274 (Looted from Kosinitza Monastery in 1917)	Sofia	Bulgaria	INTF
1784	13th/14th	Gospels	245	Center for Slavic and Byzantine Studies, 328 (Looted from Kosinitza Monastery in 1917)	Sofia	Bulgaria	INTF
1785	13th/14th	New Testament	388	Owner unknown, (Looted from Kosinitza Monastery in 1917)			
1786	15th	Gospels	331	Center for Slavic and Byzantine Studies, 365 (Looted from Kosinitza Monastery in 1917)	Sofia	Bulgaria	INTF
1787	11th/12th	Gospels	129	Center for Slavic and Byzantine Studies, 59 (Looted from Kosinitza Monastery in 1917)	Sofia	Bulgaria	INTF
1788	14th/15th	Gospels	295	Center for Slavic and Byzantine Studies, 289	Sofia	Bulgaria	INTF
1789	13th/14th	Gospels	271	Center for Slavic and Byzantine Studies, 227 (Looted from Kosinitza Monastery in 1917)	Sofia	Bulgaria	INTF
1790	13th/14th	Gospels	211	Center for Slavic and Byzantine Studies, 281 (Looted from Kosinitza Monastery in 1917)	Sofia	Bulgaria	INTF
1791	14th	Gospels	425	Center for Slavic and Byzantine Studies, 260 (Looted from Kosinitza Monastery in 1917)	Sofia	Bulgaria	INTF
1792	13th	Gospels	285	Center for Slavic and Byzantine Studies, 251 (Looted from Kosinitza Monastery in 1917)	Sofia	Bulgaria	INTF
[1793]=2856							
1794	13th	Gospels	310	Center for Slavic and Byzantine Studies, 351 (Looted from Kosinitza Monastery in 1917)	Sofia	Bulgaria	INTF
[1795]=905							
[1796]							
1797	1226	Gospels	175	Gennadius Library, Ms. 1.5	Athens	Greece	CSNTM, INTF
1798	12th	Theophylact Commentary on the Pauline epistles	337	Franzoniana Library, 24	Genoa	Italy	INTF
1799	12th/13th	Acts†, General Epistles†, Pauline Epistles†	133	Firestone Library, Garrett 8	Princeton, NJ	USA	Firestone Library
1800	12th	Gospels†	183	National Library of Russia, Gr. 183	Saint Petersburg	Russia	INTF

[top]

== See also ==
- List of New Testament papyri
- List of New Testament uncials
- List of New Testament minuscules (1–1000)
- List of New Testament minuscules (1001–2000)
- List of New Testament minuscules (2001–)
- List of New Testament minuscules ordered by Location/Institution
- List of New Testament lectionaries

== Bibliography ==
- Aland, Kurt; M. Welte; B. Köster; K. Junack (1994). Kurzgefasste Liste der griechischen Handschriften des Neues Testaments. Berlin, New York: Walter de Gruyter. p. 95. ISBN 3-11-011986-2.
- "Liste Handschriften". Münster: Institute for New Testament Textual Research.
