= List of New Testament minuscules (1401–1500) =

A New Testament minuscule is a copy of a portion of the New Testament written in a small, cursive Greek script (developed from Uncial).

== Legend ==
- The numbers (#) are the now standard system of Caspar René Gregory, often referred to as the Gregory-Aland numbers.
- Included among the cataloged minuscules are the following types of manuscripts, color coded:

Grey represents continuous text manuscripts containing only New Testament portions
Beige represents manuscripts with New Testament portions and a catena (quotations from church fathers)
Light cyan represents manuscripts of single-author commentaries who included the full Scripture text.
Light red represents manuscripts of single-author commentaries who included both the full Scripture text and a catena.
Light purple represents manuscripts of commentaries where the Scripture text was abridged.
White represents manuscript numbers no longer in use.

- Dates are estimated to the nearest 100 year increment where specific date is unknown.
- Content generally only describes sections of the New Testament: Gospels, The Acts of the Apostles (Acts), Pauline epistles, and so on. Sometimes the surviving portion of a codex is so limited that specific books, chapters or even verses can be indicated. Linked articles, where they exist, generally specify content in detail, by verse.
- Digital images are referenced with direct links to the hosting web pages, with the exception of those at the INTF. The quality and accessibility of the images is as follows:

Gold color indicates high resolution color images available online.
Tan color indicates high resolution color images available locally, not online.
Light tan color indicates only a small fraction of manuscript pages with color images available online.
Light gray color indicates black/white or microfilm images available online.
Light blue color indicates manuscript not imaged, and is currently lost or ownership unknown.
Light pink color indicates manuscript destroyed, presumed destroyed, or deemed too fragile to digitize.
Violet color indicates high resolution ultraviolet images available online.

† Indicates the manuscript has damaged or missing pages.
^{P} Indicates only a portion of the books were included.
^{K} Indicates manuscript also includes a commentary.
^{S} Indicates lost portions of manuscript replaced via supplement of a later hand.
^{abs} (abschrift) Indicates manuscript is copy.
[ ] Brackets around Gregory-Aland number indicate the manuscript belongs to an already numbered manuscript, was found to not be a continuous text manuscript, was found to be written in modern Greek versus Koine Greek, was proved a forgery, or has been destroyed.

== Minuscules 1401-1500 ==
#	Date	Contents	Pages	Institution and refs.	City, State	Country	Images
1401	12th	Gospels †	220	Pantokratoros Monastery, 59	Mount Athos	Greece	INTF
1402	12th	Gospels	235	Pantokratoros Monastery, 60	Mount Athos	Greece	INTF
1403	14th	Gospels	163	Pantokratoros Monastery, 62	Mount Athos	Greece	INTF, CSNTM
1404	13th	Gospels, Acts, General Epistles, Pauline Epistles	547	Pantokratoros Monastery, 234	Mount Athos	Greece	INTF, CSNTM
1404	13th	Gospels, Acts, General Epistles, Pauline Epistles	547	Pantokratoros Monastery, 234	Mount Athos	Greece	Elpenor
1405	15th	Acts, General Epistles, Pauline epistles	273	National Library 208	Athens	Greece	CSNTM
1405	15th	Acts, General Epistles, Pauline epistles	273	National Library 208	Athens	Greece	INTF
1406	13th	Gospels	183	Esphigmenou Monastery, 207	Mount Athos	Greece	INTF
1407	13th	Gospels†	249	Docheiariou Monastery 43	Mount Athos	Greece	INTF
1408	12th	Gospels	271	Docheiariou Monastery 44	Mount Athos	Greece	INTF
1409	14th	Gospels†, Acts†, General Epistles†, Pauline Epistles†	226	Xeropotamou Monastery 244	Mount Athos	Greece	INTF
1410	14th	Gospels	274	National Library 92	Athens	Greece	CSNTM
1410	14th	Gospels	274	National Library 92	Athens	Greece	INTF
1411	11th	Commentary on the Gospel of Luke†, Gospel of John†	163	National Library 95	Athens	Greece	CSNTM
1412	10th	Matthew†, Luke†, John†	224	National Library 98	Athens	Greece	CSNTM
1412	10th	Matthew†, Luke†, John†	224	National Library 98	Athens	Greece	INTF
1413	11th	Gospels	231	National Library 113	Athens	Greece	CSNTM
1413	11th	Gospels	231	National Library 113	Athens	Greece	INTF
1414	16th	Gospels †	288	National Library 120	Athens	Greece	CSNTM
1414	16th	Gospels †	288	National Library 120	Athens	Greece	INTF
1415	12th	Gospels	189	National Library 123	Athens	Greece	CSNTM
1415	12th	Gospels	189	National Library 123	Athens	Greece	INTF
1416	12th	Gospels	181	National Library 128	Athens	Greece	CSNTM
1416	12th	Gospels	181	National Library 128	Athens	Greece	CSNTM (2)
1417	14th	Matthew, Mark, Luke	220	National Library 132	Athens	Greece	CSNTM
1417	14th	Matthew, Mark, Luke	220	National Library 132	Athens	Greece	CSNTM (3)
1417	14th	Matthew, Mark, Luke	220	National Library 132	Athens	Greece	INTF
1418	12th	Gospels	150	National Library 135	Athens	Greece	CSNTM
1419	15th	Gospels†	245	National Library 139	Athens	Greece	CSNTM
1420	13th	Matthew†, Mark†, Luke†	69	Basel University Library A. N. IV. 5a	Basel	Switzerland	INTF
1420	13th	Matthew†, Mark†, Luke†	2	Russian Academy of Sciences Hist. Inst. 44/669	Saint Petersburg	Russia	INTF
1421	10th	Gospels	285	The Schøyen Collection Ms 675	Oslo	Norway	SC
1421	10th	Gospels	285	The Schøyen Collection Ms 675	Oslo	Norway	INTF
1422	10th/11th	Gospels	385	Charles University in Prague XXV B 7	Prague	Czech Republic	INTF
1423	11th	Gospels	352	Duke University, KW Clark, Gk Ms 60	Durham, NC	USA	DU
1423	11th	Gospels	352	Duke University, KW Clark, Gk Ms 60	Durham, NC	USA	INTF
1424	9th/10th	New Testament	337	Kosinitza Monastery, returned by Lutheran School of Theology at Chicago, Gruber, 152)	Drama	Greece	CSNTM
1425	1125	Gospels, Acts, General Epistles, Pauline Epistles	269	Center for Slavic and Byzantine Studies, 358 (Looted from Kosinitza Monastery in 1917)	Sofia	Bulgaria	INTF
1426	10th	Gospels	316	Center for Slavic and Byzantine Studies, 338	Sofia	Bulgaria	INTF
1427	14th	Gospels	360	Center for Slavic and Byzantine Studies, 132	Sofia	Bulgaria	INTF
1428	1285	Gospels	315	Center for Slavic and Byzantine Studies, 339 (Looted from Kosinitza Monastery in 1917)	Sofia	Bulgaria	INTF
1429	11th	Gospels	222	Kosinitza Monastery, returned by Museum of the Bible, (MOTB.MS.000352)	Drama	Greece	Christie's
1430	11th	Gospels†	199	Owner unknown, formerly: Looted from Kosinitza Monastery in 1917, (220)			
1431	1471	Gospels	213	Center for Slavic and Byzantine Studies, 326	Sofia	Bulgaria	INTF
1432	12th	Gospels	224	Bible Museum, Ms. 3	Münster	Germany	CSNTM, INTF
1433	12th	Gospels†, Acts†, General Epistles†, Pauline Epistles†	267	Formerly, Skete of Saint Andrew, 9 (destroyed)	Mount Athos	Greece	
1434	12th	Gospels	167	Vatopedi Monastery, 886	Mount Athos	Greece	INTF
1435	11th	Gospels	404	Vatopedi Monastery, 937	Mount Athos	Greece	INTF
1436	13th	Gospels	212	Vatopedi Monastery, 942	Mount Athos	Greece	INTF
1437	12th	Luke	160	Vatopedi Monastery, 248	Mount Athos	Greece	INTF
1438	11th	Gospels	340	Vatopedi Monastery, 960	Mount Athos	Greece	INTF, CSNTM
1439	11th	Gospels	328	Great Lavra Monastery, A' 2	Mount Athos	Greece	INTF, CSNTM
1440	13th	Gospels†	206	Great Lavra Monastery, A' 3	Mount Athos	Greece	INTF
1441	12th	Gospels	210	Great Lavra Monastery, A' 4	Mount Athos	Greece	INTF
1442	13th	Gospels	301	Great Lavra Monastery, A' 5	Mount Athos	Greece	INTF
1443	1047	Gospels	308	Great Lavra Monastery, A' 6	Mount Athos	Greece	INTF, CSNTM
1444	11th	Gospels	349	Great Lavra Monastery, A' 7	Mount Athos	Greece	INTF, CSNTM
1445	1323	Gospels	278	Great Lavra Monastery, A' 8	Mount Athos	Greece	INTF, CSNTM
1446	13th	Gospels	187	Great Lavra Monastery, A' 9	Mount Athos	Greece	INTF
1447	1337	Gospels	230	Great Lavra Monastery, A' 10	Mount Athos	Greece	INTF, CSNTM
1448	12th	Gospels, Acts, General Epistles, Pauline Epistles	256	Great Lavra Monastery, A' 13	Mount Athos	Greece	INTF, CSNTM
1449	11th	Gospels†	319	Great Lavra Monastery, A' 14	Mount Athos	Greece	INTF, CSNTM
1450	12th	Gospels	274	Great Lavra Monastery, A' 17	Mount Athos	Greece	INTF
1451	12th/13th	Gospels†	254	Great Lavra Monastery, A' 18	Mount Athos	Greece	INTF
1452	992	Gospels	266	Great Lavra Monastery, A' 19	Mount Athos	Greece	CSNTM
1453	12th	Gospels	207	Great Lavra Monastery, A' 20	Mount Athos	Greece	INTF
1454	12th	Gospels	256	Great Lavra Monastery, A' 21	Mount Athos	Greece	INTF
1455	11th/12th	Gospels	283	Great Lavra Monastery, A' 22	Mount Athos	Greece	INTF, CSNTM
1456	13th	Gospels†, Acts†, General Epistles†, Pauline Epistles†	227	Great Lavra Monastery, A' 24	Mount Athos	Greece	INTF
1457	12th/13th	Gospels†	254	Great Lavra Monastery, A' 25	Mount Athos	Greece	INTF
1458	10th	Gospels	323	Great Lavra Monastery, A' 26	Mount Athos	Greece	INTF, CSNTM
1459	12th	Gospels†	214	Great Lavra Monastery, A' 27	Mount Athos	Greece	INTF
1460	12th	Gospels	263	Great Lavra Monastery, A' 28	Mount Athos	Greece	INTF
1461	13th	Gospels	332	Great Lavra Monastery, A' 29	Mount Athos	Greece	INTF
1462	14th	Gospels	265	Great Lavra Monastery, A' 31	Mount Athos	Greece	INTF
1463	13th	Gospels	213	Great Lavra Monastery, A' 32	Mount Athos	Greece	INTF
1464	12th/13th	Gospels	292	Great Lavra Monastery, A' 33	Mount Athos	Greece	INTF
1465	13th	Gospels	308	Great Lavra Monastery, A' 34	Mount Athos	Greece	INTF
1466	1270	Gospels	233	Great Lavra Monastery, A' 35	Mount Athos	Greece	INTF, CSNTM
1467	14th	Gospels	343	Great Lavra Monastery, A' 36	Mount Athos	Greece	INTF
1468	13th	Gospels	245	Great Lavra Monastery, A' 37	Mount Athos	Greece	INTF
1469	13th	Gospels†	174	Great Lavra Monastery, A' 38	Mount Athos	Greece	INTF
1470	11th	Gospels	215	Great Lavra Monastery, A' 39	Mount Athos	Greece	INTF, CSNTM
1471	13th	Gospels	396	Great Lavra Monastery, A' 40	Mount Athos	Greece	INTF
1472	13th	Gospels	306	Great Lavra Monastery, A' 41	Mount Athos	Greece	INTF
1473	11th	Gospels	227	Great Lavra Monastery, A' 42	Mount Athos	Greece	INTF
1474	12th	Gospels	416	Great Lavra Monastery, A' 44	Mount Athos	Greece	INTF
1474	12th	Gospels	2	Walters Art Museum, Ms. W. 530d,e	Baltimore, MD	USA	WAM
1475	12th	Gospels	279	Great Lavra Monastery, A' 45	Mount Athos	Greece	INTF
1476	1333	Gospels	349	Great Lavra Monastery, A' 46	Mount Athos	Greece	INTF, CSNTM
1477	13th	Gospels	286	Great Lavra Monastery, A' 47	Mount Athos	Greece	INTF
1478	11th/12th	Gospels†	229	Great Lavra Monastery, A' 48	Mount Athos	Greece	INTF, CSNTM
1479	13th	Gospels	266	Great Lavra Monastery, A' 49	Mount Athos	Greece	INTF
1480	14th	Gospels	243	Great Lavra Monastery, A' 50	Mount Athos	Greece	INTF
1481	12th	Gospels	222	Great Lavra Monastery, A' 52	Mount Athos	Greece	INTF
1482	1304	Gospels, Acts, General Epistles, Pauline Epistles	395	Great Lavra Monastery, A' 54	Mount Athos	Greece	INTF
1483	11th	Gospels	272	Great Lavra Monastery, A' 57	Mount Athos	Greece	INTF, CSNTM
1484	13th	Gospels	299	Great Lavra Monastery, A' 59	Mount Athos	Greece	INTF
1485	12th	Gospels	227	Great Lavra Monastery, A' 60	Mount Athos	Greece	INTF
1486	1098	Gospels	239	Great Lavra Monastery, A' 61	Mount Athos	Greece	INTF, CSNTM
1487	13th	Gospels	275	Great Lavra Monastery, A' 62	Mount Athos	Greece	INTF
1488	14th	Gospels	271	Great Lavra Monastery, A' 63	Mount Athos	Greece	INTF
1489	12th	Gospels	287	Great Lavra Monastery, A' 64	Mount Athos	Greece	INTF
1490	12th	Gospels, Acts, General Epistles, Pauline Epistles	309	Great Lavra Monastery, A' 65	Mount Athos	Greece	INTF
1491	13th	Gospels	195	Great Lavra Monastery, A' 66	Mount Athos	Greece	INTF
1492	1342	Gospels	343	Great Lavra Monastery, A' 67	Mount Athos	Greece	INTF, CSNTM
1493	14th	Gospels	182	Great Lavra Monastery, A' 68	Mount Athos	Greece	INTF
1494	13th	Gospels	267	Great Lavra Monastery, A' 69	Mount Athos	Greece	INTF
1495	14th	Gospels, General Epistles, Pauline Epistles†	263	Great Lavra Monastery, A' 73	Mount Athos	Greece	INTF
1496	13th	Gospels	287	Great Lavra Monastery, A' 74	Mount Athos	Greece	INTF
1497	13th	Gospels	348	Great Lavra Monastery, A' 75	Mount Athos	Greece	INTF
1498	13th	Gospels	217	Great Lavra Monastery, A' 76	Mount Athos	Greece	INTF
1498	13th	Gospels	2	Walters Art Museum, Ms. W. 530f,g	Baltimore, MD	USA	WAM
1498	13th	Gospels	1	H.R. Willoughby, Ms. 2	Chicago, IL	USA	INTF
1498	13th	Gospels	1	National School of Fine Arts	Paris	France	INTF
1499	13th	Gospels	230	Great Lavra Monastery, A' 77	Mount Athos	Greece	INTF
1500	9th	Matthew† 4:18-28:20, Mark 1:1-15:16†	156	Great Lavra Monastery, A' 78	Mount Athos	Greece	INTF

[top]

== See also ==
- List of New Testament papyri
- List of New Testament uncials
- List of New Testament minuscules (1–1000)
- List of New Testament minuscules (1001–2000)
- List of New Testament minuscules (2001–)
- List of New Testament minuscules ordered by Location/Institution
- List of New Testament lectionaries

== Bibliography ==
- Aland, Kurt; M. Welte; B. Köster; K. Junack (1994). Kurzgefasste Liste der griechischen Handschriften des Neues Testaments. Berlin, New York: Walter de Gruyter. p. 95. ISBN 3-11-011986-2.
- "Liste Handschriften". Münster: Institute for New Testament Textual Research.
