= Lectionary 2138 =

Lectionary ℓ 2138
- New Testament manuscript
- Text: New Testament
- Date: 1627
- Script: Greek
- Found: Wallachia
- Now at: Duke University
- Size: 20.0 cm by 27.2 cm

Lectionary 2138 designed by sigla ℓ 2138 (in the Gregory-Aland numbering). It is a Greek minuscule manuscript of the New Testament, written on 260 paper leaves (20.0 cm by 27.2 cm).

== Description ==
The text is written in two columns per page, in 26 lines per page.

The codex contains Lessons from the four Gospels lectionary (Evangelistarium). It was written in 1627 in Wallachia, by a scribe named Loukas Buzau.

== History ==
The codex was purchased by Kenneth Willis Clark. Currently it is located in the Kenneth Willis Clark Collection of the Duke University (Gk MS 39) at Durham.

== See also ==
- List of New Testament lectionaries
- Biblical manuscripts
- Textual criticism
