= Lectionary 2144 =

Lectionary ℓ 2144
- New Testament manuscript
- Text: Evangelistarion
- Date: 12/13th century
- Script: Greek
- Now at: Duke University
- Size: 22.5 cm by 15.3 cm

Lectionary 2144 designated by sigla ℓ 2144 (in the Gregory-Aland numbering), is a Greek minuscule manuscript of the New Testament, written on 5 parchment leaves (22.5 cm by 15.3 cm). Paleographically it has been assigned to the 12th or 13th century.

== Description ==
The codex contains Lessons from the four Gospels lectionary (Evangelistarium). It is written in two columns per page, in 28 lines per page.

== History ==
The codex once belonged to Kenneth Willis Clark. Currently it is located in the Kenneth Willis Clark Collection of the Duke University (Gk MS 27) at Durham.

== See also ==
- List of New Testament lectionaries
- Biblical manuscript
- Textual criticism
