= Lectionary 2145 =

Greek minuscule manuscript of the New Testament

Lectionary ℓ 2145
- New Testament manuscript
- Text: Evangelistarion
- Date: 13th century
- Script: Greek
- Now at: Duke University / Schøyen Collection
- Size: 22.8 cm by 15.0 cm

Lectionary 2145 designated by siglum ℓ 2145 (in the Gregory-Aland numbering), is a Greek minuscule manuscript of the New Testament, written on 2 parchment leaves (22.5 by 15.3 cm). Paleographically it has been assigned to the 13th century.

== Description ==
The codex contains Lessons from the four Gospels lectionary (Evangelistarium). The text is written in two columns per page, in 33 lines per page.

The leaf contains portions of the readings (Menologion), for June 24 (Luke 1:59-80)-June 25 (Matthew 16: 13-18). The leaf housed at the Schøyen Collection contains Menologion for 6 September.

== History ==
The codex was divided, and is held in two places. The leaf of the codex that belonged to Kenneth Willis Clark is held at the Kenneth Willis Clark Collection of the Duke University (Gk MS 43) at Durham. The other leaf is housed at the Schøyen Collection (MS 653) at Oslo.

== See also ==
- List of New Testament lectionaries
- Biblical manuscript
- Textual criticism
- Uncial 0301
