= Lectionary 1839 =

Minuscule 1839
- New Testament manuscript
- Text: New Testament
- Date: 11th century
- Script: Greek
- Now at: Duke University
- Size: 24.5 cm by 17.0 cm

Lectionary 1839, designated by ℓ 1839 (in the Gregory-Aland numbering), is a Greek minuscule manuscript of the New Testament, written on 256 parchment leaves (30.6 cm by 22.7 cm). Paleographically it had been assigned to the 11th century.

== Description ==
The codex contains Lessons from the Gospels. It is a lectionary (Evangelistarium). Written in two columns per page, in 27 lines per page.

== History ==
The codex was presented by the friends of the Duke University Library in honor of Kenneth Willis Clark. Currently it is housed at the Kenneth Willis Clark Collection of the Duke University (Gk MS 65) at Durham.

== See also ==
- List of New Testament lectionaries
- Biblical manuscript
- Textual criticism
