= Lectionary 451 =

Minuscule 451
- New Testament manuscript
- Text: New Testament
- Date: 1052
- Script: Greek
- Found: Athens, 1886
- Now at: Duke University
- Size: 30.7 cm by 23.2 cm

Lectionary 451, designated by sigla ℓ 451 (in the Gregory-Aland numbering), is a Greek minuscule manuscript of the New Testament, written on 242 parchment leaves (30.7 cm by 23.2 cm). Palaeographically it has been assigned to the 11th century.

== Description ==
The codex contains Lessons from the Gospels of John, Matthew and Luke. It is a lectionary (Evangelistarium). The text is written in two columns per page, in 22-23 lines per page.

The manuscript was written by Clement the monk who signed and dated the colophon on f. 242v (in Greek):

"Written in the month of July 20, indiction 5, year 6560 [i.e., A. D. 1052]; presented by Clement the worthless monk to the monastery of the most holy Mother of God of the Cave."

== History ==
Formerly the codex was held in Athens, known for scholars since 1886. It was purchased by K. W. Clark and currently is housed at the Kenneth Willis Clark Collection of the Duke University (Gk MS 85) at Durham.

== See also ==
- List of New Testament lectionaries
- Biblical manuscripts
- Textual criticism
