= Lectionary 175 =

Lectionary ℓ 175
- New Testament manuscript
- Text: Apostolarion
- Date: 15th century
- Script: Greek
- Now at: New York Public Library
- Size: 24.1 by 17.7 cm

Lectionary 175, designated by siglum ℓ 175 (in the Gregory-Aland numbering) is a Greek manuscript of the New Testament, on paper. Paleographically it has been assigned to the 15th century. Formerly it was labelled as Lectionary 76^{a} (Gregory).

== Description ==
The codex contains Lessons from the Acts, Catholic, and Pauline epistles lectionary (Apostolarion), on 113 paper leaves (24.1 cm by 17.7 cm). It is written in Greek minuscule letters, in two columns per page, 25 lines per page. It is a palimpsest, the lower text is in Arabic.

== History ==
The manuscript once belonged to Meerman, then to T. Williams, then to Herzog von Sussex. Caspar René Gregory saw the manuscript in 1895.

The manuscript is not cited in the critical editions of the Greek New Testament (UBS3).

Currently the codex is located in the New York Public Library, (Rare Books and Manuscripts Divisions, Ms. 103) at New York City.

== See also ==
- List of New Testament lectionaries
- Biblical manuscript
- Textual criticism

== Bibliography ==
- K. W. Clark, A Descriptive Catalogue of Greek New Testament Manuscripts in America, Chicago: The Chicago of University Press, 1937, pp. 142–144.
