= Lectionary 1967 =

Lectionary ℓ 1967
- New Testament manuscript
- Text: New Testament
- Date: 11th century
- Script: Greek
- Now at: Duke University
- Size: 24.6 cm by 18.5 cm

Lectionary 1967 designated by sigla ℓ 1967 (in the Gregory-Aland numbering), is a Greek minuscule manuscript of the New Testament, written on 241 parchment and paper leaves (24.6 cm by 18.5 cm). Paleographically it has been assigned to the 11th century.

== Description ==
The codex contains Lessons from the four Gospels lectionary (Evangelistarium). Leaves 1-230 are written on parchment, leaves 231-241 on paper. Paper was added at the end. Written in two columns per page, in 20 lines per page.

== History ==
The codex now is located in the Kenneth Willis Clark Collection of the Duke University (Gk MS 24) at Durham.

== See also ==
- List of New Testament lectionaries
- Biblical manuscripts
- Textual criticism
