= Minuscule 2615 =

- New Testament manuscript
- Text: Gospels
- Date: c. 1500
- Script: Greek
- Found: 1950
- Now at: Duke University
- Size: 20.2 cm by 15.4 cm
- Category: none

Minuscule 2615 (in the Gregory-Aland numbering), is a Greek minuscule manuscript of the New Testament, written on paper and parchment in a form of scroll (20.2 cm by 15.4 cm).

Paleographically it has been assigned to the 15th or 16th century. Written in one column per page, in 21 lines per page.

== Description ==
The codex contains the complete text of the four Gospels. Written carefully in small minuscule letters. There is mixture of minuscule and uncial characters. Uncials usually in the beginning of words, and almost never in the medial position. Titles were written in red colour. It contains the Ammonian Sections and the Eusebian Canons.

Kurt Aland the Greek text of the codex did not place in any Category. According to the Claremont Profile Method it represents the textual family Π^{a} in Luke 1, Luke 10, and Luke 20.

== History ==
The codex formerly belonged to the Saint Catherine's Monastery. It was purchased by Kenneth Willis Clark in 1950.

The codex now is located in the Kenneth Willis Clark Collection of the Duke University (Gk MS 15) at Durham.

== See also ==
- List of New Testament minuscules
- Textual criticism
