= Lectionary 1966 =

Lectionary ℓ 1966
- New Testament manuscript
- Text: New Testament
- Date: ca. 1100
- Script: Greek
- Now at: Duke University
- Size: 33.0 cm by 26.0 cm

Lectionary 1966 designated by sigla ℓ 1966 (in the Gregory-Aland numbering), is a Greek minuscule manuscript of the New Testament, written on parchment. Paleographically it has been assigned to the 11th/12th century (or about 1200).

== Description ==
The codex contains Lessons from the four Gospels lectionary (Evangelistarium) on 224 parchment leaves (33.0 cm by 26.0 cm). Written in two columns per page, in 29 lines per page. Four paper leaves added at the end.

== History ==
The codex now is located in the Kenneth Willis Clark Collection of the Duke University (Gk MS 12) at Durham.

== See also ==
- List of New Testament lectionaries
- Biblical manuscripts
- Textual criticism
