= Lectionary 1619 =

Lectionary ℓ 1619
- New Testament manuscript
- Text: Evangelistarion
- Date: 17th
- Script: Greek
- Found: Venice
- Now at: Duke University
- Size: 19.4 by 13.7 cm

Lectionary 1619, or ℓ 1619 in the Gregory-Aland numbering is a Greek minuscule manuscript of the New Testament, written on 312 parchment leaves (19.4 cm by 13.7 cm). Paleographically it had been assigned to the 17th century.

== Description ==
The codex contains Lessons from the Gospels. It is a lectionary (Evangelistarium). The text is written in one column per page, 27 lines per page.

== History ==
Place of the provenance - Venice. In 1933 it was purchased in London for Duke University. Currently it forms part of the Kenneth Willis Clark Collection of Greek Manuscripts in the David M. Rubenstein Rare Book & manuscript Library of Duke University (Greek MS 2) in Durham, North Carolina.

== See also ==
- List of New Testament lectionaries
- Textual criticism
