= Lectionary 1965 =

Lectionary ℓ 1965
- New Testament manuscript
- Text: New Testament
- Date: 12th century
- Script: Greek
- Now at: Duke University
- Size: 26.5 cm by 19.2 cm

Lectionary 1966 designated by sigla ℓ 1965 (in the Gregory-Aland numbering). It is a Greek minuscule manuscript of the New Testament, written on 181 parchment leaves (26.5 cm by 19.2 cm). Paper added at the end. Paleographically it had been assigned to the 12th century. Written in two columns per page, in 23-24 lines per page.

== Description ==
The codex contains Lessons from the four Gospels lectionary (Evangelistarium).

== History ==
Currently the codex is located in the Kenneth Willis Clark Collection of the Duke University (Gk MS 10) at Durham.

== See also ==
- List of New Testament lectionaries
- Biblical manuscripts
- Textual criticism
