= Lectionary 177 =

Lectionary ℓ 177
- New Testament manuscript
- Text: Apostolarion †
- Date: 11th century
- Script: Greek
- Now at: British Library
- Size: 19.8 cm by 14.5 cm

Lectionary 177, designated by siglum ℓ 177 (in the Gregory-Aland numbering) is a Greek manuscript of the New Testament, on parchment. Palaeographically it has been assigned to the 11th century. Formerly it was labelled as Lectionary 75^{a} (Scrivener), 79^{a} (Gregory).

== Description ==
The codex contains Lessons from the Acts, Catholic, and Pauline epistles lectionary (Apostolarion), on 86 parchment leaves (19.8 cm by 14.5 cm), with lacunae. It has some lessons from the Old Testament (leaves 52–54) for 23 September. Some of leaves in disorder.

The text is written in Greek minuscule letters, in two columns per page, 22-23 lines per page.

Three lessons from 1 John 3:21—4:6; 4:9—16; 4:20—5:5, 1 Peter 1:3—8; 1:13—19; 2:11—24.

== History ==
The manuscript was examined by Gregory in 1883.

The manuscript is not cited in the critical editions of the Greek New Testament (UBS3).

Currently the codex is located in the British Library, (Additional manuscripts 11841) at London.

== See also ==
- List of New Testament lectionaries
- Biblical manuscript
- Textual criticism
