= Lectionary 93 =

Lectionary ℓ 93
- New Testament manuscript
- Text: Apostolos
- Date: 16th-century
- Script: Greek
- Now at: Bibliothèque nationale de France
- Size: 20.8 cm by 13.6 cm

Lectionary 93, designated by siglum ℓ 93 (in the Gregory-Aland numbering), is a Greek manuscript of the New Testament, on paper leaves. Palaeographically, it has been assigned to the 16th century (Scrivener 14th-century).

== Description ==
The codex contains lessons from the Acts of the Apostles, Catholic epistles, and Pauline epistles lectionary (Apostolos). It is written in Greek minuscule letters, on 144 paper leaves (20.8 cm by 13.6 cm). The writing stands in one column per page, in 25 lines per page.

It contains fragments of the Liturgy of Chrysostom and St. Basil.

== History ==
It was partially examined by Scholz. It was examined and described by Paulin Martin. C. R. Gregory saw it in 1885.

The manuscript is not cited in the critical editions of the Greek New Testament (UBS3).

Currently the codex is located in the Bibliothèque nationale de France (Gr. 326) in Paris.

== See also ==
- List of New Testament lectionaries
- Biblical manuscript
- Textual criticism

== Bibliography ==
- Jean-Pierre-Paul Martin, Description technique des manuscrits grecs, relatif au N. T., conservé dans les bibliothèques des Paris (Paris 1883), p. 161
