= Lectionary 648 =

Lectionary ℓ 648
- New Testament manuscript
- Text: New Testament
- Date: 16th century
- Script: Greek
- Now at: Duke University
- Size: 22.5 cm by 15.3 cm

Lectionary 648 designated by sigla ℓ 648 (in the Gregory-Aland numbering), is a Greek minuscule manuscript of the New Testament, written on 232 paper leaves (22.5 cm by 15.3 cm). Paleografically it had been assigned to the 16th century.

== Description ==
The codex contains Lessons from the four Gospels lectionary (Evangelistarium). Written in two columns per page, in 20 lines per page.

== History ==
Formerly it was held at Dionysiou Monastery (307) in Athos.

Currently the codex is housed in the Kenneth Willis Clark Collection of the Duke University (Gk MS 28) at Durham.

== See also ==
- List of New Testament lectionaries
- Biblical manuscripts
- Textual criticism
