= Minuscule 2757 =

- New Testament manuscript
- Text: Gospels
- Date: 12/13th century
- Script: Greek
- Now at: Duke University
- Size: 26.5 cm by 18.7 cm
- Category: none

Minuscule 2757 (in the Gregory-Aland numbering), is a Greek minuscule manuscript of the New Testament, written on 266 parchment leaves (26.5 cm by 18.7 cm). Palaeographically it has been assigned to the 12th century (or 13th).

== Description ==
The codex contains the complete text of the four Gospels. The text is written in one column per page, in 26-27 lines per page. The titles are written in semi-uncials or uncials, and mostly in red (faded). Zeta formed like the rounded number 3. Title in Mark is written red semi-uncial letters, in rest of the Gospels in red uncial letters. It contains the Ammonian Sections, a references to the Eusebian Canons, synaxarion, and menologion. It used the nomina sacra written in an abbreviated form.

Kurt Aland did not place the Greek text of the codex in any Category. According to the Claremont Profile Method it has Mix/Kmix/K^{x}.

== History ==
The codex now is located in the Kenneth Willis Clark Collection of the Duke University (Gk MS 38) at Durham.

== See also ==
- List of New Testament minuscules
- Biblical manuscripts
- Textual criticism
