= Minuscule 2423 =

- New Testament manuscript
- Text: Acts, CE, Paul
- Date: 13th century
- Script: Greek
- Now at: Duke University
- Size: 20.2 cm by 15 cm
- Type: Byzantine text-type
- Category: V

Minuscule 2423 (in the Gregory-Aland numbering), is a Greek minuscule manuscript of the New Testament, on 227 parchment leaves (20.2 cm by 15 cm); it is dated paleographically to the 13th century.

== Description ==
The codex contains the text of the Acts of the Apostles, Catholic epistles, Pauline epistles with some lacunae. Epistle to the Hebrews is placed between 2 Thessalonians and 1 Timothy.

The text is written in one column per page, in 27 lines per page.

== Text ==
The Greek text of the codex is a representative of the Byzantine text-type. Aland placed it in Category V.

== History ==
The codex now is located in the Kenneth Willis Clark Collection of the Duke University (Gk MS 3) at Durham.

== See also ==
- List of New Testament minuscules
- Textual criticism
