= Minuscule 2268 =

Greek minuscule manuscript of the New Testament

- New Testament manuscript
- Text: Gospel of Mark 1:1-14
- Date: 13th century
- Script: Greek
- Now at: Duke University
- Size: 23.4 cm by 16.7 cm
- Category: none

Minuscule 2268 (in the Gregory-Aland numbering), ε 2058 (Soden's numbering), is a Greek minuscule manuscript of the New Testament. Paleographically it has been assigned to the 13th century. Only one leaf of the codex has survived.

== Description ==
The codex contains a small part of the Gospel of Mark 1:1-14 on 1 parchment leaf (23.4 cm by 16.7 cm). The text is written in one column per page, in 22 lines per page (15.3 by 12 cm).

The titles written in red ink, the initial letters in gold. The text is divided according to the Ammonian Sections, whose numbers are given at the margin, with references to the Eusebian Canons (written below Ammonian Section numbers). It contains pictures (portraits of the four Evangelist).

Kurt Aland the Greek text of the codex did not place it in any Category. It was not examined by the Claremont Profile Method.

== History ==
The codex now is located in the Kenneth Willis Clark Collection of the Duke University (Gk MS 4) at Durham.

== See also ==
- List of New Testament minuscules (2001–)
- Textual criticism
