= Lectionary 1623 =

Lectionary ℓ 1623
- New Testament manuscript
- Text: Evangelistarion
- Date: 11th/12th century
- Script: Greek
- Now at: Duke University
- Size: 34.5 by 23.8 cm

Lectionary 1623, designated by ℓ 1623 in the Gregory-Aland numbering, is a Greek minuscule manuscript of the New Testament, written on 312 parchment leaves (34.5 cm by 23.8 cm). Paleographically it has been assigned to the 11th or 12th century.

== Description ==
The codex contains Lessons from the Gospels. It is a lectionary (Evangelistarium). Written in two columns per page, 23-28 lines per page.

== History ==
Currently it is housed at the Kenneth Willis Clark Collection of the Duke University (Gk MS 2) at Durham.

== See also ==
- List of New Testament lectionaries
- Textual criticism
