= Minuscule 2614 =

- New Testament manuscript
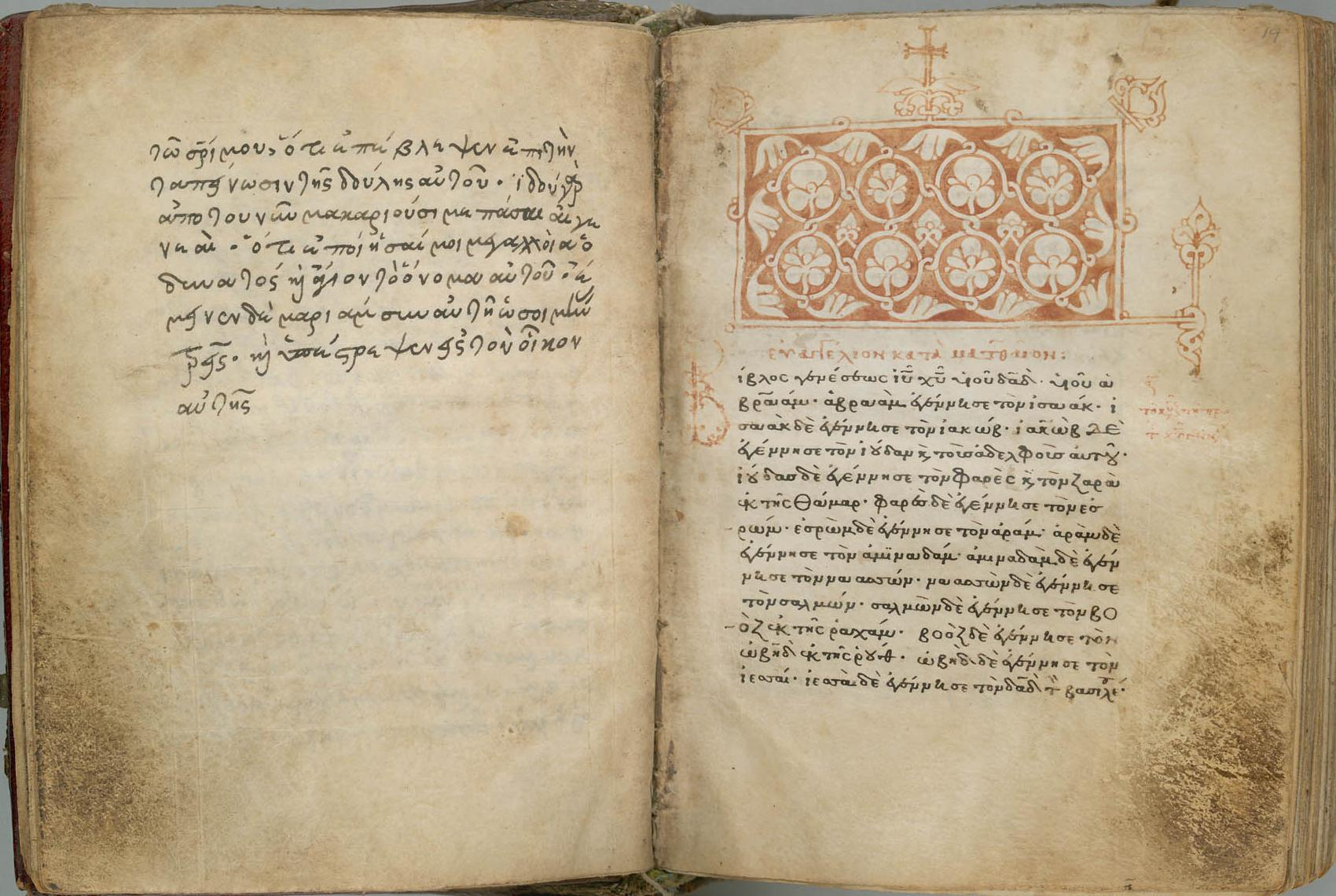
- The first page of Matthew
- Text: Gospels
- Date: 13th century
- Script: Greek
- Now at: Duke University
- Size: 20.2 cm by 15.0 cm
- Type: Mixed
- Category: none

Minuscule 2614 (in the Gregory-Aland numbering), is a Greek minuscule manuscript of the New Testament, dated paleographically to the 13th century.

== Description ==
The codex contains the complete text of the four Gospels, on 272 parchment leaves (20.2 cm by 15.0 cm). It contains miniatures. Written in one column per page, in 20 lines per page.

The Greek text of the codex Kurt Aland did not place in any Category. According to the Claremont Profile Method it represents the textual family K^{x} in Luke 1, textual cluster Π171 in Luke 10 and Luke 20.

== History ==
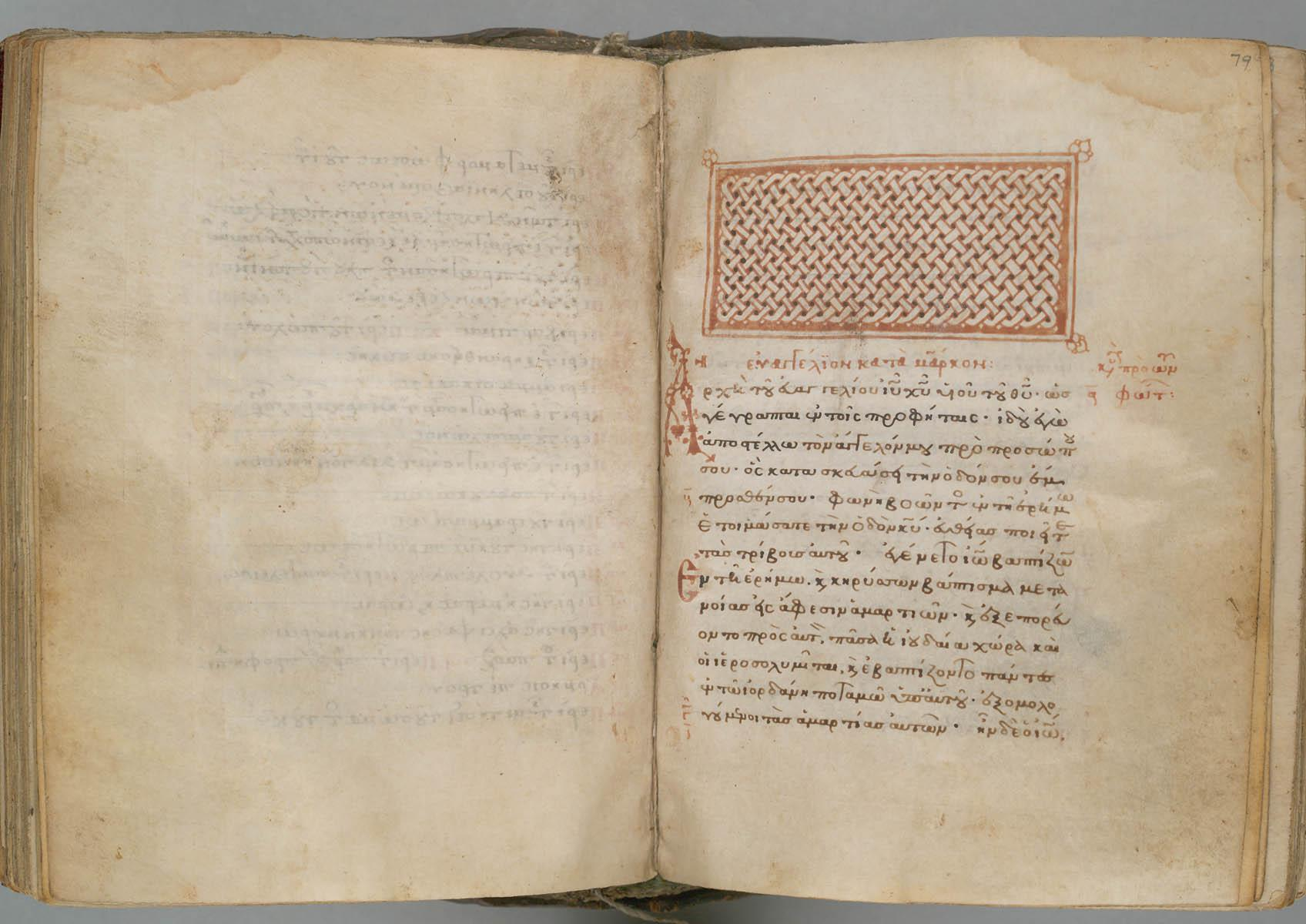
Beginning of Mark

The codex now is located in the Kenneth Willis Clark Collection of the Duke University (Gk MS 7) at Durham.

== See also ==
- List of New Testament minuscules
- Textual criticism
