= Minuscule 1813 =

- New Testament manuscript
- Text: Tetraevangelion
- Date: ca. 1100
- Script: Greek
- Found: Trebizond
- Now at: Duke University
- Size: 22.5 cm by 14.9 cm
- Category: none
- Hand: roundish cursive

Minuscule 1813, designated by number 1813 (in the Gregory-Aland numbering), ε 3047 (Soden), is a Greek minuscule manuscript of the New Testament, written on 235 parchment leaves (22.5 by 14.9 cm). Paleografically it had been assigned to the 11th century (or 12th).

== Description ==
It contains a complete text of the four Gospels. It is written in a roundish cursive hand. The writing is in one column per page, in 26-27 lines per page. It contains Synaxarion and Menologion.

== Text ==
Kurt Aland did not place the Greek text of the codex in any Category. According to the Claremont Profile Method it represents textual family K^{r} in Luke 1 and Luke 20. In Luke 10 no profile was made. It creates a pair with 966.

== History ==
The name of scribe was Hierotheos. Formerly, it was kept in the monastery in Soumela (Ms. 82), in Trebizond. Purchased on 1961 for $ 2 380.

Currently the codex is located in the Kenneth Willis Clark Collection of the Duke University (Gk MS 25) at Durham.

== See also ==
- List of New Testament minuscules (1001-2000)
- Biblical manuscripts
- Textual criticism
