= Minuscule 2613 =

- New Testament manuscript
- Text: Gospels
- Date: 11th century
- Script: Greek
- Now at: Duke University
- Size: 18 cm by 14.4 cm
- Category: none

Minuscule 2613 (in the Gregory-Aland numbering), is a Greek minuscule manuscript of the New Testament, on parchment. Dated paleographically to the 11th century.

== Description ==
The codex contains the complete text of the four Gospels on 321 parchment leaves (18 cm by 14.4 cm). The text is written in one column per page, in 18 lines per page.

Aland did not place it to any Category. According to the Claremont Profile Method it represents textual group M106 in Luke 1, Luke 10, and Luke 20.

== History ==
The codex now is located in the Kenneth Willis Clark Collection of the Duke University (Gk MS 6) at Durham.

== See also ==
- List of New Testament minuscules
- Textual criticism
