= Minuscule 2616 =

- New Testament manuscript
- Text: Gospels
- Date: 12th century
- Script: Greek
- Now at: Duke University
- Size: 17.7 cm by 12.9 cm
- Category: none

Minuscule 2616 (in the Gregory-Aland numbering), is a Greek minuscule manuscript of the New Testament, written on 280 parchment leaves (17.7 cm by 12.9 cm). Paleographically it has been assigned to the 12th century.

== Description ==
The codex contains the complete text of the four Gospels. The text is written in two columns per page, in 21 lines per page. Numbered only on the recto of leaf. The title in Mark is written in red semi-uncial letters, in rest of the Gospels in red uncial letters. It contains the Ammonian Sections and references to the Eusebian Canons.

Kurt Aland the Greek text of the codex did not place in any Category. According to the Claremont Profile Method it represents the textual family K^{x} in Luke 1 and Luke 20. In Luke 10 it has a mixture of the Byzantine textual families.

== History ==
The codex now is located in the Kenneth Willis Clark Collection of the Duke University (Gk MS 16) at Durham.

== See also ==
- List of New Testament minuscules
- Biblical manuscript
- Textual criticism
