= Minuscule 1780 =

- New Testament manuscript
- Text: New Testament
- Date: 13th century
- Script: Greek
- Found: Ikosifinissa
- Now at: Duke University
- Size: 30.6 cm by 22.7 cm
- Category: none

Minuscule 1780 (in the Gregory-Aland numbering) δ 412 (von Soden), is a Greek minuscule manuscript of the New Testament, written on 198 parchment leaves (30.6 cm by 22.7 cm). Paleografically it has been assigned to the 13th century (or about 1200).

== Description ==
The codex contains entire of the New Testament with unusual order of the General epistles. Written in one column per page, in 41-52 lines per page. The order of the books: Gospels, Acts, James, Pauline epistles, General epistles (except for James), the Apocalypse. It contains prolegomena to the Catholic epistle, and a commentary to the Apocalypse without the text.

The Greek text of the codex Kurt Aland did not place in any Category. According to the Claremont Profile Method it has a mixture of the Byzantine families in Luke 1, and represents the textual family K^{x} in Luke 10 and Luke 20.

== History ==
Probably it was written in Calabria. Before World War I it was held in Kosinitza. It was examined by Lake in 1902. Professor Harvie Branscomb of the Duke Divinity School bought the manuscript in the Munich bookshop. The manuscript after his arriving to the Library became Duke Greek Ms. 1. It was happen on 19 February 1931.

The codex now is located in the Kenneth Willis Clark Collection of the Duke University (Gk MS 1) at Durham.

== See also ==
- List of New Testament minuscules (1001-2000)
- Biblical manuscripts
- Textual criticism
