= Codex Daltonianus =

Greek minuscule manuscript of the New Testament

Minuscule 1423
- New Testament manuscript
- Name: Codex Daltonianus
- Text: Gospels
- Date: 14th century
- Script: Greek
- Found: Ikosifinissa
- Now at: Duke University
- Size: 29.0 cm by 21.8 cm
- Category: none

Codex Daltonianus, known as Minuscule 1423 (in the Gregory-Aland numbering), designated by A^{119} (in the Soden numbering), is a Greek minuscule manuscript of the New Testament, written on a paper. Palaeographically it had been assigned to the 14th century (or about 1200).

== Description ==
The codex contains the complete text of the four Gospels on 352 paper leaves (29.0 by 21.8 cm), with marginal commentaries (approx. 47 lines). The text is written in one column per page, in 21 and more lines per page. Titles of κεφαλαια are written in semi-uncials. The headings are ornamented. It contains Prolegomena, tables of κεφαλαια (tables of contents) before each Gospel, κεφαλαια (chapters) at the margin, and commentaries.

Kurt Aland did not place it in any Category. It was not examined by the Claremont Profile Method.

== History ==
Lake described it in 1902. It was added to the list of the New Testament manuscripts by C. R. Gregory.

The codex now is located in the Kenneth Willis Clark Collection of the Duke University (Gk MS 60) at Durham.

== See also ==
- List of New Testament minuscules (1001-2000)
- Biblical manuscripts
- Textual criticism
