= Minuscule 2491 =

- New Testament manuscript
- Text: Matthew 19-23, Mark 1:14-5:33; Mark 9:14-Luke 11:46
- Date: 12th century
- Script: Greek
- Now at: Staatsbibliothek zu Berlin; Burgerbibliothek Bern; Duke University
- Size: 26.3 cm by 20.4 cm
- Type: Byzantine text-type
- Category: V

Minuscule 2491 (in the Gregory-Aland numbering), is a Greek minuscule manuscript of the New Testament, on 61 parchment leaves (26.3 cm by 20.4 cm). It is dated paleographically to the 12th century. The text is written in one column per page, in 24 lines per page.

== Description ==
Formerly the codex contained the text of the four Gospels. To the present day survived only texts Matthew 19–23, Mark 1:14-5:33; Mark 9:14-Luke 11:46. Currently parts of the codex are held in three places. 36 leaves (Matthew 19–22; Mark 15:44-Luke 11:46) are housed at the Staatsbibliothek zu Berlin (Graec. qu. 90).

24 leaves are housed at the Burgerbibliothek Bern (Cod. 784) in Bern, they contain text Mark 1:14-5:33; 9:14-15:44.

The only one leaf of the codex is located in the Kenneth Willis Clark Collection of the Duke University (Gk MS 22) at Durham. It was labelled as minuscule 2617 (Gregory-Aland), it contains text Matthew 22:31-23:10.

== Text ==
The Greek text of the codex is a representative of the Byzantine text-type. Aland placed it in Category V.

== See also ==
- List of New Testament minuscules
- Textual criticism
