= Minuscule 2612 =

- New Testament manuscript
- Text: Gospels
- Date: 13th century
- Script: Greek
- Now at: Duke University
- Size: 19.5 cm by 14.5 cm
- Type: Byzantine text-type
- Category: none

Minuscule 2612 (in the Gregory-Aland numbering), is a Greek minuscule manuscript of the New Testament, on 184 parchment leaves (19.5 cm by 14.5 cm). Dated paleographically to the 13th century.

== Description ==
The codex contains text of the four Gospels. The text is written in one column per page, in 21-28 lines per page.

The codex contains the text of the four Gospels, in the order: Mark, Luke, John, and Matthew.

== Text ==
The Greek text of the codex, is a representative of the Byzantine text-type. Aland did not place it in any Category. According to the Claremont Profile Method it represents the textual family K^{x} in Luke 10 and Luke 20. In Luke 10 the manuscript is defective.

== History ==
The codex now is located in the Kenneth Willis Clark Collection of the Duke University (Gk MS 5) at Durham.

== See also ==
- List of New Testament minuscules
- Textual criticism
- Biblical manuscript
