= Minuscule 927 =

- New Testament manuscript
- Text: New Testament (except Rev.)
- Date: 1133
- Script: Greek
- Now at: Malibu, Athens
- Size: 22.2 cm by 18.3 cm
- Type: Byzantine
- Category: none
- Note: marginalia

Minuscule 927 (in the Gregory-Aland numbering), δ 251 (von Soden), is a 12th-century Greek minuscule manuscript of the New Testament on parchment. It has marginalia. The manuscript has survived in complete condition.

== Description ==
The codex contains the text of the New Testament without Book of Revelation, on 280 parchment leaves (size 22.2 cm by 18.3 cm). The text is written in one column per page, 26 lines per page. The leaves of the codex are arranged in octavo. According to Hermann von Soden it is an ornamented manuscript. It contains the Epistula ad Carpianum, the Eusebian Canon tables at the beginning and pictures. It contains also liturgical books with hagiographies: Synaxarion and Menologion.

== Text ==
The Greek text of the codex is a representative of the Byzantine. Hermann von Soden classified it to the textual family K^{1}. Kurt Aland did not place it in any Category. According to the Claremont Profile Method it belongs to the textual family K^{x} in Luke 1, Luke 10 and Luke 20.

== History ==
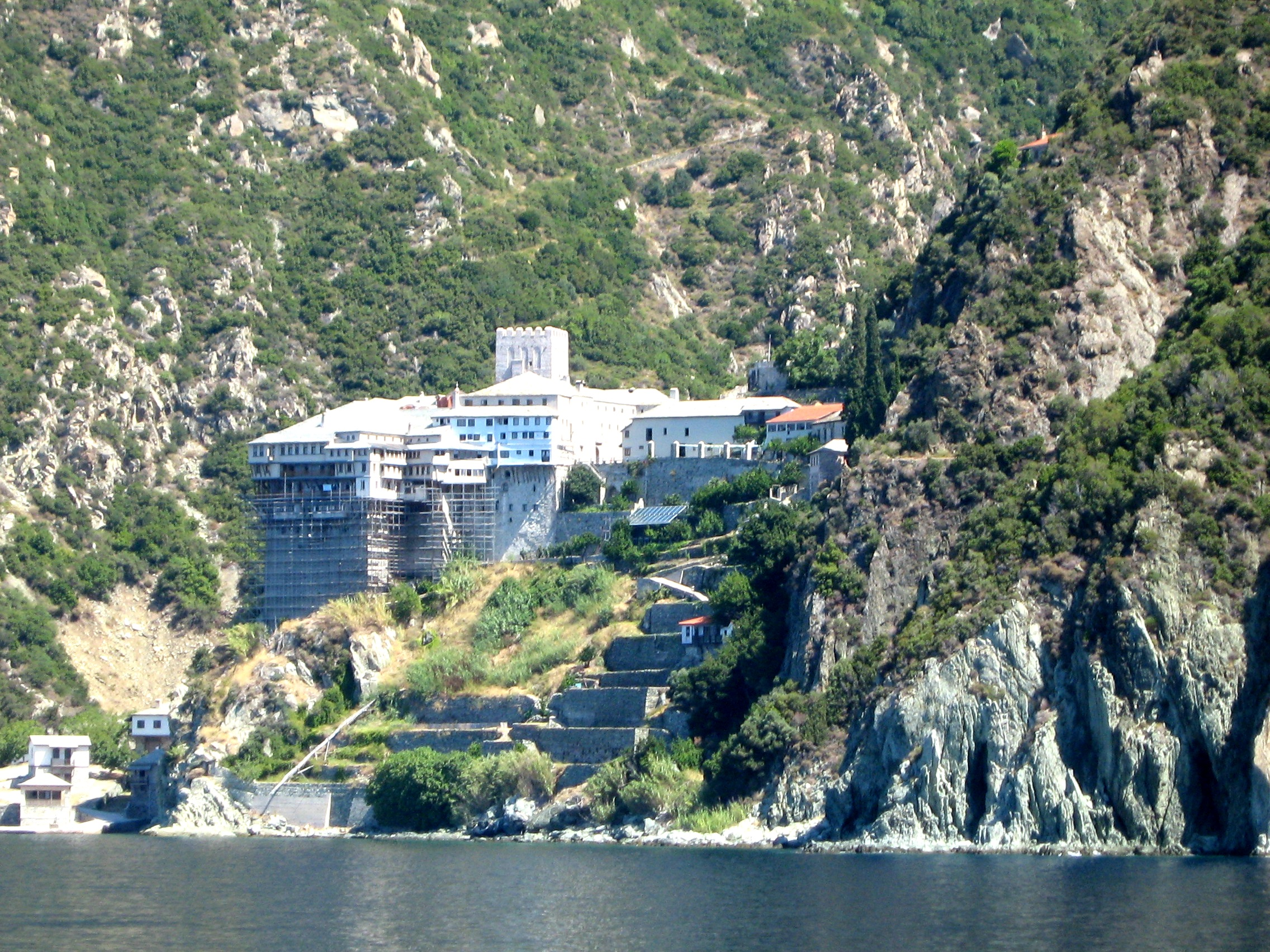
View on the monastery Dionysiou

According to the colophon it was written in 1133. Currently the manuscript is dated by the Institute for New Testament Textual Research (INTF) to the 13th century. It was written by scribe named Theoklistus. The codex 927 was seen by Gregory at the Dionysiou monastery (8), in Mount Athos. 279 folios of the manuscript are housed at the J. Paul Getty Museum (Ludw. II 4) Malibu, California, and one folio is housed at the Paul Kanellopoulos Museum in Athens. The leaf from Athens used to be cataloged as minuscule 2618.

The manuscript was added to the list of New Testament manuscripts by C. R. Gregory (927^{e}). It was not on the Frederick Henry Ambrose Scrivener's list, but it was added to his list by Edward Miller in the 4th edition of A Plain Introduction to the Criticism of the New Testament.

It is not cited in the critical editions of the Greek New Testament (UBS4, NA28).

Kirsopp Lake published facsimile of the codex.

== See also ==
- List of New Testament minuscules (1–1000)
- Biblical manuscript
- Textual criticism
