= Saint Ignatios Monastery =

Monastery on the island of Lesbos, Greece

- Limonos Monastery
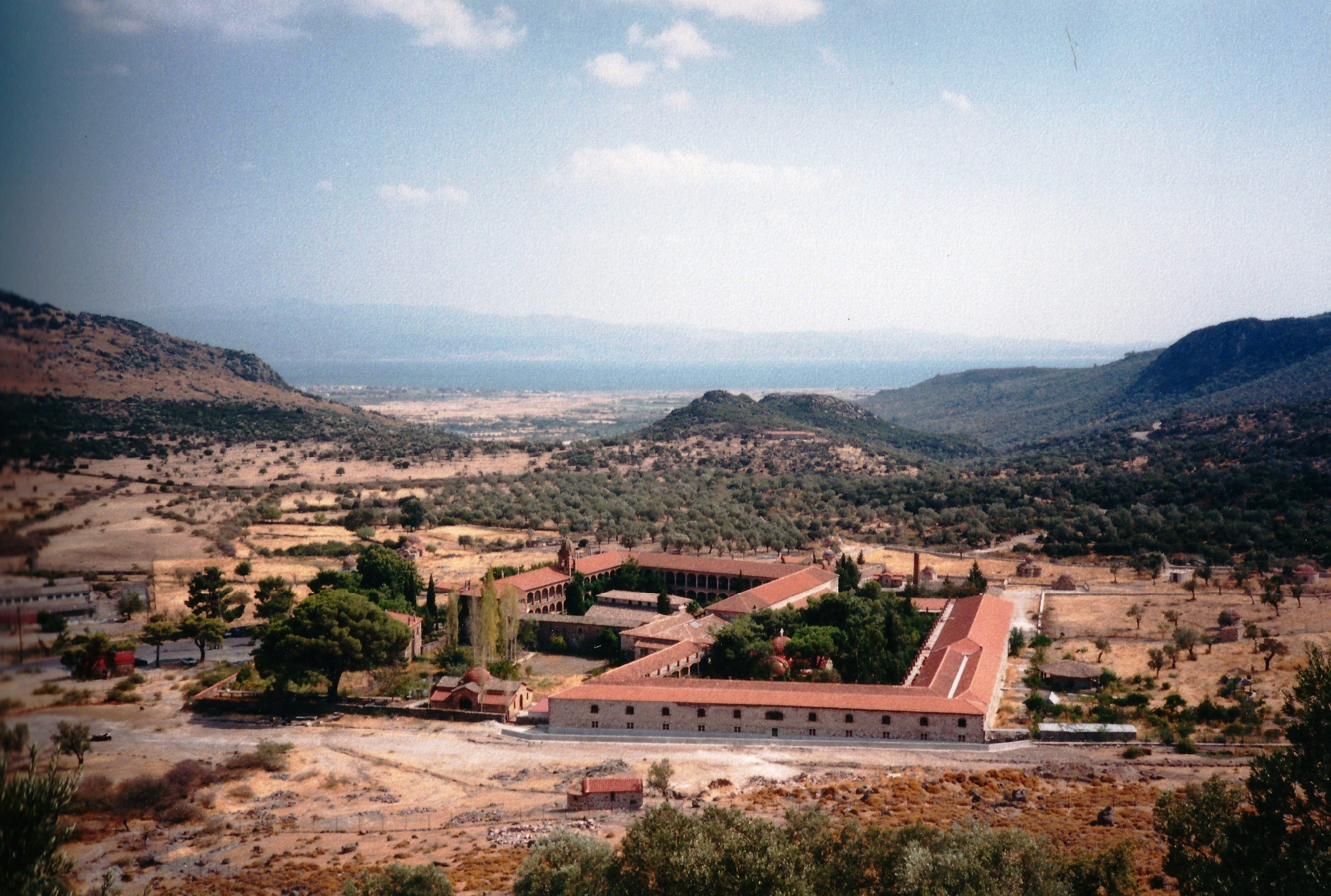
- External view of the monastery

- Location of the monastery in Greece
- Saint Ignatios Monastery
- 39°14′52″N 26°10′20″E
- Location: Kalloni, Lesbos, North Aegean
- Country: Greece
- Language: Greek
- Denomination: Greek Orthodox

History
- Status: Monastery
- Dedication: Saint Ignatios

Architecture
- Completed: 1526

The Saint Ignatios Monastery is a Greek Orthodox monastery, located outside the city of Kalloni on the island of Lesbos, in the North Aegean region of Greece. It is also known as the Limonas Monastery or the Limonos Monastery, due to the field on which it is built.

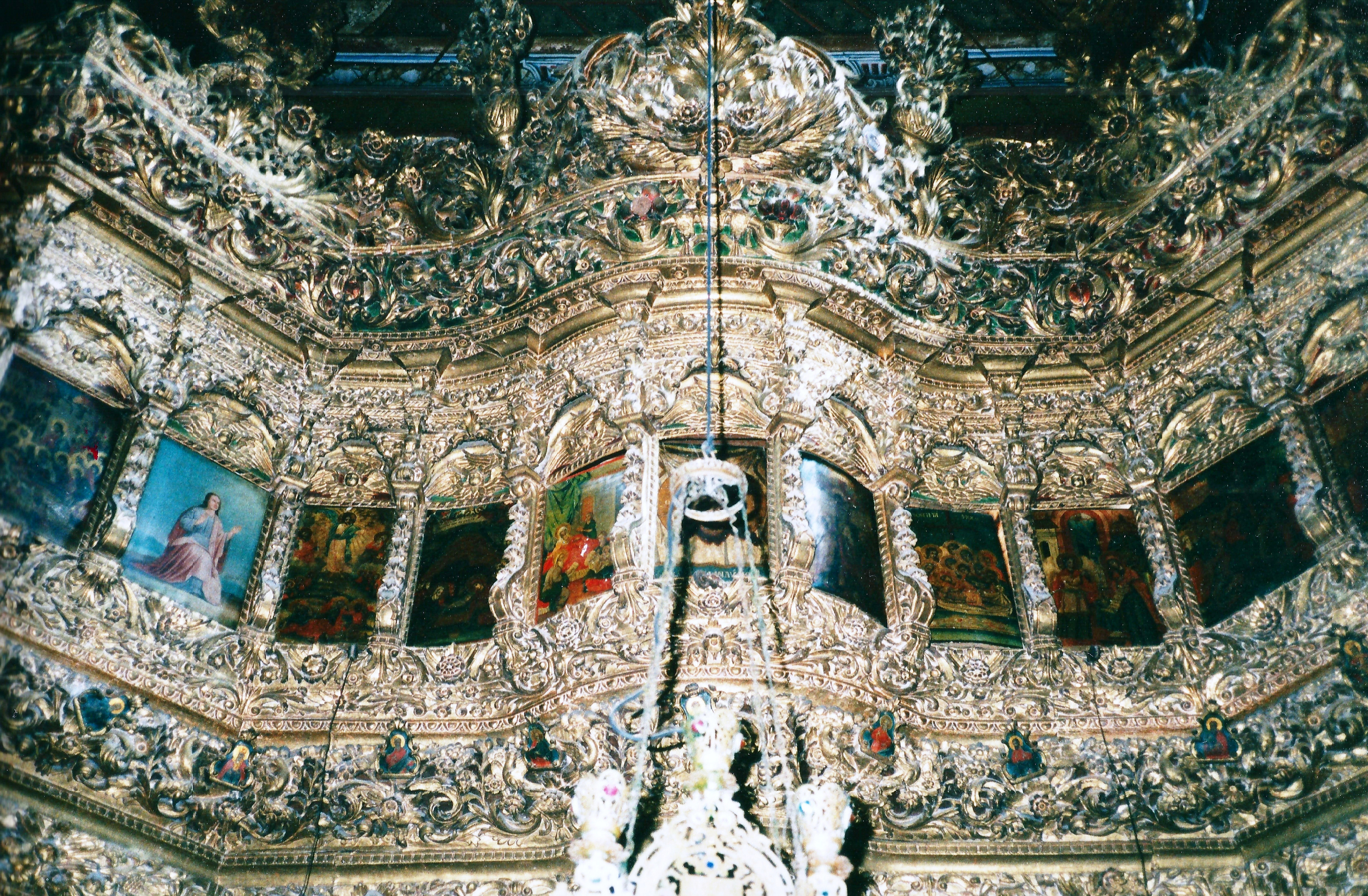
Interior

Founded in 1526 by Saint Ignatios Agallianos, the monastery contains many important relics collected over the years and houses a library which contains many manuscripts and icons. It now has over 2,500 volumes of books and 450 manuscripts and Greek and Ottoman documents.

== See also ==
- Church of Greece
- List of Greek Orthodox monasteries in Greece
