= New Testament minuscule =

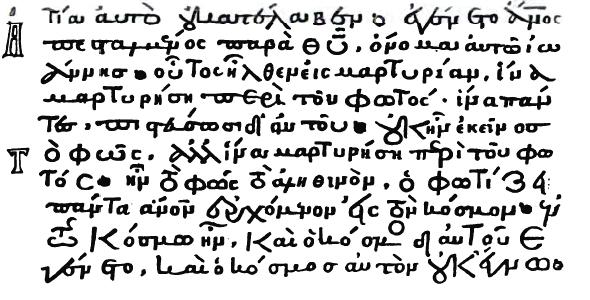
Codex Ebnerianus, Minuscule 105, (12th), John 1:5b-10

A New Testament minuscule is a copy of a portion of the New Testament written in Greek minuscule, a small, cursive Greek language script (developed from Uncial). Most of the minuscules are still written on parchment. Paper was used since the 12th century.

New Testament minuscules are distinct from:

- New Testament papyri — written on papyrus and more ancient than minuscules;
- New Testament uncials — written in uncial script (i.e. all capital letters) also more ancient than minuscules; and,
- New Testament lectionaries — usually written minuscule (but some in uncial) letters and generally contemporary.

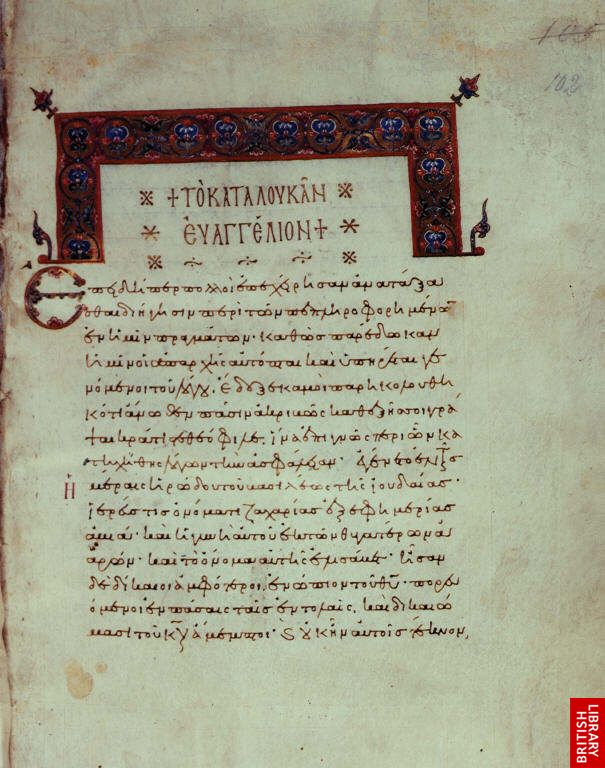
Minuscule 481, Gospel of Luke 1:1-7a

Minuscules codices contain commentaries and other additional matter, like, Prolegomena to the four Gospels, the Epistula ad Carpianum, the treatise of Pseudo-Dorotheus on the Seventy disciples and twelve apostles (82, 93, 117, 459, 613), List of Lord's miracles (e.g. 536), List of Parables of Jesus (e.g. 273, 536), short biographies of the Apostles, or summaries of the journeys of St. Paul (e.g. 468). Since the 9th century some manuscripts have notes with the date and place of the composition of the different NT books. Some manuscripts informed about name of scribe and date of composition of the manuscript, but date usually reckoning from the creation of the world (5508 BC). It was the Byzantine manner. Only in a few minuscule codices is the date reckoned from the birth of Christ.

== Classification of minuscules ==
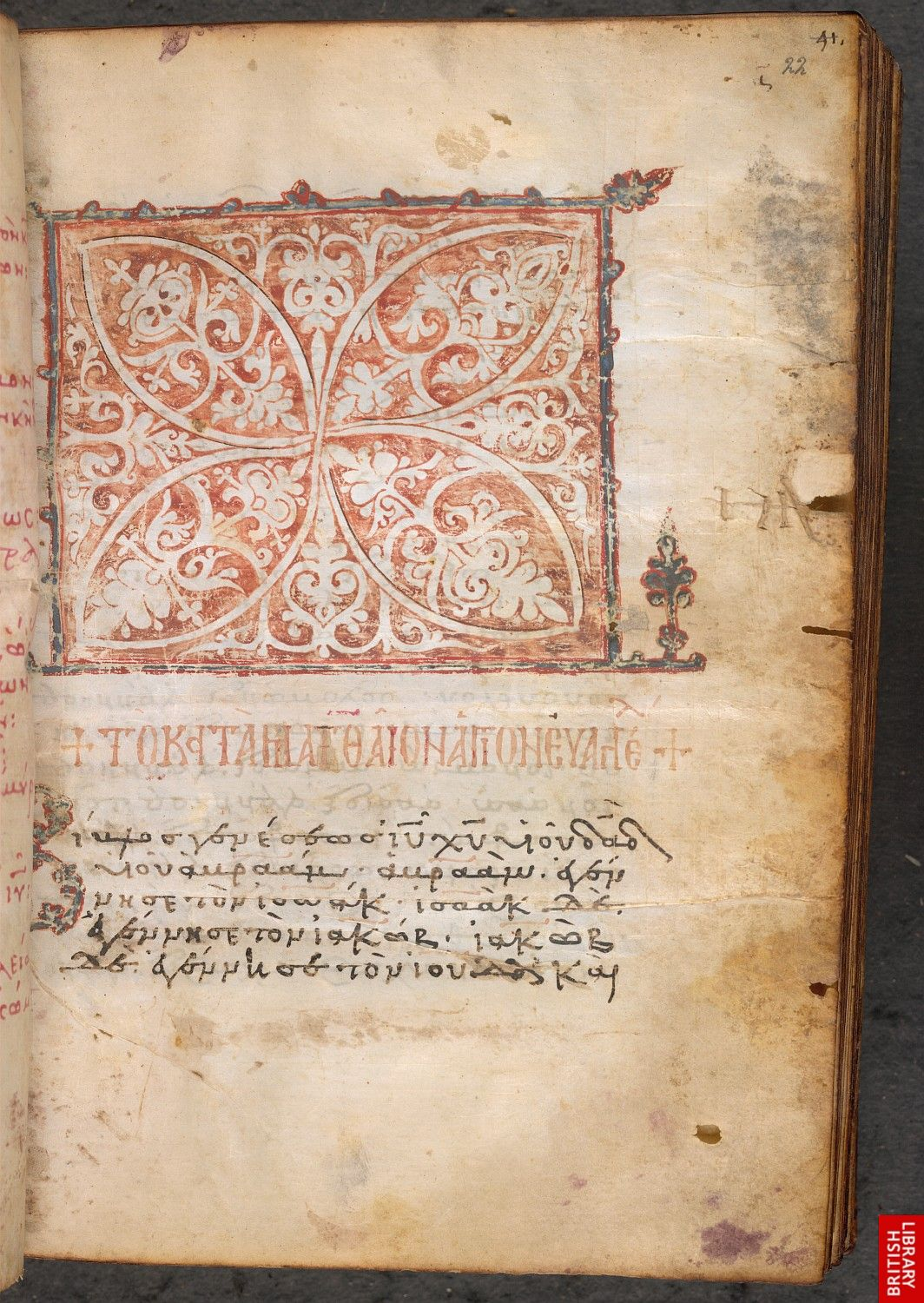
Minuscule 485, beginning of Matthew

Since the time of J. J. Wettstein the minuscules manuscripts have been indicated by Arabic numerals, but the numbers in each of the four groups of the books of the New Testament began with 1, and thus "1" might indicate a book in any of the manuscripts (f.e. 1^{eap}, 1^{r}, 2^{e}, 2^{ap}). Different parts of the same manuscript had different numbers (f.e. 18^{evv}, 113^{Acts}, 132^{Paul}, and 51^{Apoc} belonged to the same manuscript). Only the first manuscript situation was simple, because it had number 1 in Gospels (1^{e}), in Acts and Catholic epistles (1^{a}), and in Pauline epistles (1^{p}). This system was complicated. Scrivener, for instance, enumerated known for him minuscule codices:

- Gospels .... 739
- Acts and Catholic epistles .... 261
- Pauline epistles .... 338
- Apocalypse .... 122

It did not mean that the total number of minuscules was 1460, because some of them belonged to the same manuscripts.

Wettstein's system was improved and corrected by F. H. A. Scrivener, C. R. Gregory, and other scholars. Aland renumbered minuscule manuscripts (1^{r} received number 2814, 2^{ap} received 2815, 4^{ap} received 2816 etc.), and now every minuscule manuscript has a different catalogue number.

Renumbered minuscules:

- 1^{r} received number 2814,
- 2^{ap} received 2815,
- 4^{ap} received 2816,
- 7^{p} received 2817,
- 36^{a} received 2818,
- 753^{b} received 2819,
- 753^{c} received 2820,
- 60^{r} received 2821,
- 1274b^{ap} received 2822,
- 1352b^{ap} received 2824,
- 1674b^{ap} received 2825,
- 1674c^{ap} received 2826,
- 1674d^{ap} received 2827,
- 1681b^{ap} received 2828,
- 1755b^{ap} received 2829,
- 1755c^{ap} received 2830,
- 2306b^{ap} received 2831,
- 2306c^{ap} received 2832,
- 2306d^{ap} received 2833,
- 2306e^{ap} received 2834,
- ℓ 1891^{ap} received 2835.

Wettstein knew 112 minuscule codices of the Gospels, 58 of the Acts, 60 of St. Paul, and 28 of the Apocalypse. Manuscripts of the Gospels with number 260–469 were added to the list by Scholz (1794–1852). Gregory in 1908 knew 2292 all minuscule manuscripts of the New Testament. As of 16 November 2010, there are currently 2911 minuscule codices catalogued by the Institute for New Testament Textual Research (INTF) in Münster.

== Lists of New Testament minuscules ==
- List of New Testament minuscules (1–1000)
- List of New Testament minuscules (1001–2000)
- List of New Testament minuscules (2001–)
- List of New Testament minuscules ordered by Location/Institution

== See also ==
Other lists

- Categories of New Testament manuscripts
- List of New Testament papyri
- List of New Testament uncials
- List of New Testament lectionaries
- List of New Testament Latin manuscripts
- List of the Syriac New Testament manuscripts

Sortable articles

- Paleography
- Biblical manuscript
- Minuscule Greek

== Bibliography ==
- Scrivener, F.H.A., "A Plain Introduction to the Criticism of the New Testament", Fourth edition. Cambridge 1861, London 1894.
- Soden, Hermann von, "Die Schriften des Neuen Testaments, in ihrer ältesten erreichbaren Textgestalt hergestellt auf Grund ihrer Textgeschichte", Berlin 1902–1910.
- Caspar René Gregory, "Die griechischen Handschriften des Neuen Testaments"; Leipzig 1908.
- K. Aland, M. Welte, B. Köster, K. Junack, "Kurzgefasste Liste der griechischen Handschriften des Neuen Testaments", Walter de Gruyter, Berlin, New York 1994, pp. 47–215. ISBN 3-11-011986-2
- K. Aland, B. Aland, "The Text of the New Testament: An Introduction to the Critical Editions and to the Theory and Practice of Modern Text Criticism", trans. E. F. Rhodes, William B. Eerdmans Publishing Company, Grand Rapids, Michigan 1995 (3rd ed.).
