= Kenneth Willis Clark Collection =

The Kenneth Willis Clark Collection of Greek Manuscripts in the David M. Rubenstein Rare Book & Manuscript Library, Duke University contains over one hundred manuscripts — in both roll and codex form — dating from the 9th to the 17th century. The collection as a whole is named in his honor and includes manuscripts collected and donated by Kenneth Clark as well as manuscripts acquired from other sources.

== Description ==
Professor Harvie Branscomb of the Duke Divinity School bought a manuscript of the Greek New Testament in a Munich bookshop. The manuscript after its arrival at the Library became Duke Greek Ms. 1. This was on 19 February 1931, and it was the beginning of the collection. Although the initial intention was only to collect manuscripts of the New Testament, today the collection contains a variety of materials.

In the collection are 27 manuscripts which contain texts of the New Testament. Among this number — Mss. 4, 5, 6, 15, 22, 25, 31, 38, 60, and 64. Ms. 60, also known as Codex Daltonianus, is most notable among this group. Written in the latter half of the 11th century, it contains commentaries to the four Gospels.

There are also some Lectionaries in collection, represented by MSS. 1, 2, 10, 12, 20, 24, 27, 28, 39, 43, 65, 82, 83, 85. Two lectionaries are more notable: Ms 65 and 85. Ms 65 (ℓ 1839) was written in the 11th century. Ms. 85 (ℓ 451), is signed by Clement the Monk who dated it on 20 July, indiction 5, in the year 6560 [i.e., AD 1052]. This signature makes it one of the earliest dated Greek lectionary manuscripts. Another manuscript, Ms. 39, was written by the scribe Lucas. A large-format lectionary written on paper, it was produced between 1626 and 1629.

== See also ==
- Ms. 3
- Ms. 7
- Ms. 16
- Ms. 22
