= Kenneth Willis Clark =

Kenneth Willis Clark (1898–1979) was a professor at Duke University, Greek palaeographer; area of interest: Greek New Testament manuscripts, and author of numerous books.

Clark catalogued the Greek New Testament manuscripts housed in the libraries of the United States and Canada (1937). Clark described and catalogued manuscripts housed in the library of the Saint Catherine's Monastery during his an expedition the Mount Sinai (1952). According to his report two-thirds of that library comprised Greek manuscripts with items in Arabic, Persian, Georgian, Syriac, Ethiopian and Slavonic. He also catalogued the manuscripts housed in the libraries of the Greek and Armenian Patriarchates in Jerusalem (1953).

== Works ==
- Codex 2401 - the Theophanes praxapostolos (1933)
- A Descriptive Catalogue of Greek New Testament Manuscripts in America (1937)
- Eight American praxapostoloi (1941)
- Checklist of Manuscripts in St. Catherine's monastery, Mount Sinai, microfilmed for the Library of Congress, 1950, prepared under the direction of Kenneth W. Clark, general editor of the Mount Sinai Expedition, 1949-50 (1952)
- Checklist of manuscripts in the libraries of the Greek and Armenian Patriarchates in Jerusalem (1953)
- Exploring the manuscripts of Sinai and Jerusalem (1953)
- The making of the Twentieth century New Testament (1955)
- The Posture of the Ancient Scribe, "The Biblical Archaeologist" Vol. 26, No. 2 (May, 1963), pp. 63–72.
- Theological relevance of textual variation in current criticism of the Greek New Testament, "Journal of Biblical Literature", Vol. 85, No. 1 (Mar., 1966), pp. 1–16
- Studies in the history and text of the New Testament in honor of Kenneth Willis Clark (1967)
- Illuminations in manuscripts in St. Catherine's monastery, Mount Sinai (1973)
- The Gentile bias and other essays (1980)

== See also ==
- Kenneth Willis Clark Collection
