= List of New Testament minuscules (2801–2900) =

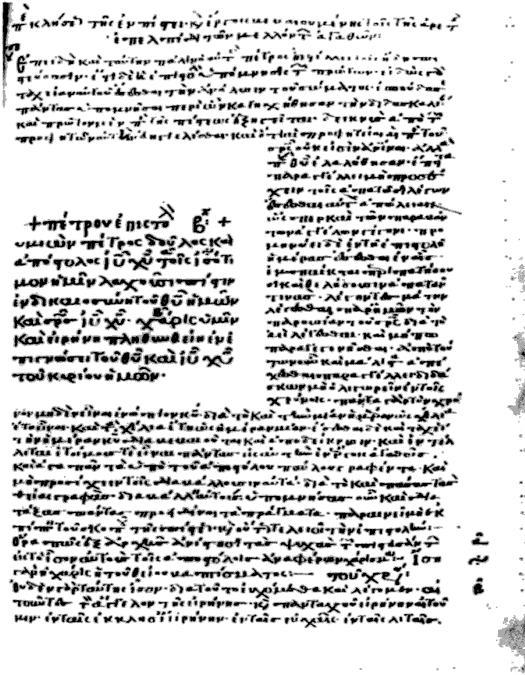
2 Peter 1:1-2 in Minuscule 2818

A New Testament minuscule is a copy of a portion of the New Testament written in a small, cursive Greek script (developed from Uncial).

== Legend ==
- The numbers (#) are the now standard system of Caspar René Gregory, often referred to as the Gregory-Aland numbers.
- Included among the cataloged minuscules are the following types of manuscripts, color coded:

Grey represents continuous text manuscripts containing only New Testament portions
Beige represents manuscripts with New Testament portions and a catena (quotations from church fathers)
Light cyan represents manuscripts of single-author commentaries who included the full Scripture text.
Light red represents manuscripts of single-author commentaries who included both the full Scripture text and a catena.
Light purple represents manuscripts of commentaries where the Scripture text was abridged.
White represents manuscript numbers no longer in use.

- Dates are estimated to the nearest 100 year increment where specific date is unknown.
- Content generally only describes sections of the New Testament: Gospels, The Acts of the Apostles (Acts), Pauline epistles, and so on. Sometimes the surviving portion of a codex is so limited that specific books, chapters or even verses can be indicated. Linked articles, where they exist, generally specify content in detail, by verse.
- Digital images are referenced with direct links to the hosting web pages, with the exception of those at the INTF. The quality and accessibility of the images is as follows:

Gold color indicates high resolution color images available online.
Tan color indicates high resolution color images available locally, not online.
Light tan color indicates only a small fraction of manuscript pages with color images available online.
Light gray color indicates black/white or microfilm images available online.
Light blue color indicates manuscript not imaged, and is currently lost or ownership unknown.
Light pink color indicates manuscript destroyed, presumed destroyed, or deemed too fragile to digitize.
Violet color indicates high resolution ultraviolet images available online.

† Indicates the manuscript has damaged or missing pages.
^{P} Indicates only a portion of the books were included.
^{K} Indicates manuscript also includes a commentary.
^{S} Indicates lost portions of manuscript replaced via supplement of a later hand.
^{abs} (abschrift) Indicates manuscript is copy.
[ ] Brackets around Gregory-Aland number indicate the manuscript belongs to an already numbered manuscript, was found to not be a continuous text manuscript, was found to be written in modern Greek versus Koine Greek, was proved a forgery, or has been destroyed.

== Minuscules 2801–2900 ==
#	Date	Contents	Pages	Institution and refs.	City, State	Country	Images
2801	12th	John^{P}	16	Saint Catherine's Monastery, N. E. M 183	Sinai	Egypt	
2802	11th	Luke^{P}	1	Osiou Gregoriou Monastery, 158 B, fol. 24	Mount Athos	Greece	INTF
2803	14th	Gospels†, Acts†, General Epistles†, Pauline Epistles†	224	Skete of Saint Demetre, 53	Mount Athos	Greece	
2804	13th	Gospels	220	Chrysopodaritissis Monastery, 1	Patras	Greece	INTF
2805	12th/13th	Acts, Pauline epistles, General Epistles	155	Daniel P. Buttafuoco Library	Woodbury, NY	United States	Christie's
2805	12th/13th	Acts, Pauline epistles, General Epistles	155	Daniel P. Buttafuoco Library	Woodbury, NY	United States	INTF
2806	1518	Gospels	354	Saint Vissarionos (Dusan) Monastery, 5	Trikala	Greece	INTF
2807	13th	Hebrews^{P}	>1	National Library of Serbia, RS 657	Belgrade	Serbia	
2808	13th/14th	Gospels	167	Kalymnos Municipal Library, 1	Kalymnos	Greece	INTF
2809	14th	Gospels	300	Kalymnos Municipal Library, 2	Kalymnos	Greece	INTF
2810	1514	Gospels	270	Tatarnis Monastery, 2	Tripotama	Greece	CSNTM
2811	9th-10th	Gospels†	158	School of Theology Library, 1	Boston, MA	USA	INTF
2812	10th	Gospels	596	National Library, Res. 235:302	Madrid	Spain	BDH
2812	10th	Gospels	596	National Library, Res. 235:302	Madrid	Spain	INTF
2813	13th	Luke†, John†	151	Museum of the Bible, GC.MS.000876	Washington, DC	USA	CSNTM
2814	12th	Andreas of Caesarea Commentary of Book of Revelation	94	University Library, Cod. I.1.4.1	Augsburg	Germany	UL, INTF
2815	12th	Acts, General Epistles, Pauline Epistles	216	Basel University Library, A. N. IV. 4	Basel	Switzerland	INTF
2816	15th	Acts, General Epistles, Pauline Epistles	287	Basel University Library, A. N. IV. 5	Basel	Switzerland	INTF, BUL
2817	12th	Pauline epistles	387	Basel University Library, A. N. III. 11	Basel	Switzerland	INTF, BUL
2818	12th	Acts, General Epistles	245	New College, 58	Oxford	United Kingdom	INTF
2819	12th	Matthew 6:6–20	1	National Library, Supplement Grec 1035, 13, fol. 28	Paris	France	INTF
2820	14th	2 Timothy 4:16–22	1	National Library, Supplement Grec 1035, 13, fol. 17	Paris	France	INTF
2821	14th	Revelation	22	Cambridge University Library, Dd. 9.69, fol. 295-316	Cambridge	United Kingdom	INTF
2822	12th	James^{P}, Jude^{P}	2	British Library, Add MS 11860, fol. 3.7	London	United Kingdom	BL
2823	11th	Luke^{P}	1	British Library, Add MS 11860, fol. 8	London	United Kingdom	BL
2824	14th	Revelation†	13	Orthodoxes Patriarchat, Stavru, 94, fol. 236-248	Jerusalem	Israel	LOC, INTF, CSNTM
2825	12th	Mark^{P}	2	St. Panteleimon Monastery, 97a, Nr. 4	Mount Athos	Greece	
2826	12th	Matthew^{P}	2	St. Panteleimon Monastery, 97a, Nr. 5	Mount Athos	Greece	
2827	11th	Matthew^{P}	2	St. Panteleimon Monastery, 97a, Nr. 6	Mount Athos	Greece	
2828	12th	John^{P}	1	Xenophontos Monastery, Ia' ?	Mount Athos	Greece	
2829	12th	Acts^{P}	5	St. Panteleimon Monastery, 98, 2	Mount Athos	Greece	INTF
2830	14th	2 Corinthians^{P}, Galatians^{P}	2	St. Panteleimon Monastery, 98, 3	Mount Athos	Greece	INTF
2831	13th	Gospels†	110	Vatopedi Monastery, 889, p. 17-236	Mount Athos	Greece	INTF
2832	14th	Matthew^{P}	6	Vatopedi Monastery, 889, p. 237-248	Mount Athos	Greece	INTF
2833	11th	Acts^{P}	4	Vatopedi Monastery, 889, p. 249-256	Mount Athos	Greece	INTF
2834	13th	Ephesians^{P}, Colossians^{P}, Hebrews^{P}	3	Vatopedi Monastery, 889, p. 257-262	Mount Athos	Greece	INTF
2835	10th-11th	Matthew† 1:20-10:29	22	Benaki Museum, MS 146	Athens	Greece	CSNTM, INTF
2836	12th	Matthew^{P}	34	The Schøyen Collection, MS 694/1	Oslo	Norway	INTF
2836	12th	Matthew^{P}	34	The Schøyen Collection, MS 694/1	London	United Kingdom	INTF
2837	14th	Matthew^{P}	154	Russian State Archive, F. 1607, No. 23	Moscow	Russia	
2838	15th	Matthew†, Luke†	151	Austrian National Library, Theol. gr. 277, fol. 77-227	Vienna	Austria	
2839	16th	Titus 1:5-2:10; 2:15-3:7	2	Vatican Library, Vat.gr.1190, fol. 1110-1111	Vatican City	Vatican City	DVL
2840	16th	1 Timothy^{P}, 2 Timothy^{P}	19	Royal Library of Belgium, IV 100, fol. 52-70	Brussels	Belgium	
[2841]=1142							
2842	14th	Matthew^{P}	3	Royal Site of San Lorenzo de El Escorial, X. IV. 6, fol. 8-10	San Lorenzo de El Escorial	Spain	
2843	16th	Revelation 1:1-7:17†	8	Orthodoxes Patriarchat, Saba, 373, fol. 392-399	Jerusalem	Israel	INTF
2844	10th	John^{P}	5	J.F. Reed Library, ms 3.(16)	King of Prussia, PA	USA	
2845	15th	Revelation	16	Bodleian Library, MS. Holkham Gr. 30(54), fol. 307-322	Oxford	United Kingdom	INTF
2846	12th	Revelation	18	National Library, Grec 977, fol. 226-243	Paris	France	BnF, INTF
2847	16th	1 John^{P}†, Revelation^{P}†	50	National Library, Grec 1060, fol. 127-176	Paris	France	BnF, INTF
2848	15th	Acts^{P}	44	National Library, Grec 1164, fol. 294-337	Paris	France	BnF
2849	14th-15th	Acts, General Epistles, Pauline Epistles, Revelation	156	Monastery of Longovardas, ms. 27 (724), fol. 1-156	Paros	Greece	
[2850]=2491							
2851	12th	Matthew^{P}	1	St. Panteleimon Monastery, 97,5	Mount Athos	Greece	
2852	13th	Galatians^{P} 6:8-18, Ephesians^{P} 1:1-22	2	The Schøyen Collection, MS 1693	Oslo	Norway	INTF
2852	13th	Galatians^{P} 6:8-18, Ephesians^{P} 1:1-22	2	The Schøyen Collection, MS 1693	London	United Kingdom	INTF
2853	10th-11th	Acts, General Epistles, Pauline Epistles	170	Owner unknown. Last: Basel, Bibliothek G. Zakos			
2854	10th	Gospels†	131	Exarchist Monastery of Saint Mary, A. a. 11.13, fol. 1-131	Grottaferrata	Italy	
2855	12th	Book of Revelation 12:12–13:13	1	The Schøyen Collection, Ms 1906	Oslo	Norway	INTF
2856	12th	Gospels	244	Ecclesiastical Historical and Archival Institute of the Patriarchate of Bulgaria, EHAI 949	Sofia	Bulgaria	
2857	1272	Gospels	305	Kremlin Museum, 11968 oxr. 10567 op.	Moscow	Russia	
2858	12th	Matthew 5:33–6:1; 9:2–15	2	Pushkin Museum, N 4790	Moscow	Russia	
2859	13th	Gospel of Luke 20:1–22:8	6	Pushkin Museum, N 4792	Moscow	Russia	
2860	10th	Gospels	180	The Van Kampen Foundation, VK 901	(Unknown)	USA	CSNTM
2860	10th	Gospels	9	Museum of the Bible, G.C.MS.000376.1-9	Washington, DC	USA	
2860	10th	Gospels	1	Adrian Herren	Pensacola, FL	USA	
2861	1300	Gospels	315	Duke University, Greek MS 064	Durham, NC	USA	DU
2862	1150–1174	Gospels	176	Duke University, Greek MS 084	Durham, NC	USA	DU
2863	12th	Gospels	262	Houghton Library, Harvard University, MS Typ. 294 (fol. 1- 262)	Cambridge, MA	USA	HL
2863	12th	Gospels	262	Houghton Library, Harvard University, MS Typ. 294 (fol. 1- 262)	Cambridge, MA	USA	INTF
2864	11th-12th	Revelation	35	Houghton Library, Harvard University, MS Typ 294 (fol. 263- 297)	Cambridge, MA	USA	INTF
2865	12th	Acts, General Epistles, Pauline Epistles	219	Houghton Library, Harvard University, MS Typ 491 (fol. 1-219)	Cambridge, MA	USA	HL
2865	12th	Acts, General Epistles, Pauline Epistles	219	Houghton Library, Harvard University, MS Typ 491 (fol. 1-219)	Cambridge, MA	USA	INTF
[2866]=2483							
2867	14th	John 1:1-3:29	8	National Library, Grec 194 A, fol. 2-9	Paris	France	BnF
2868	13th	Gospels	276	Romanian Academy, Ms. Gr. 1543	Bucharest	Romania	
2869	11th	Gospels	234	Vatopedi Monastery, Skevophylakion, 1	Mount Athos	Greece	
2870	11th	Gospels	192	Vatopedi Monastery, Skevophylakion, 2	Mount Athos	Greece	
2871	12th	Gospels	127	Vatopedi Monastery, Skevophylakion, 9	Mount Athos	Greece	
2872	11th-12th	Gospels	234	Vatopedi Monastery, Skevophylakion, 10	Mount Athos	Greece	
2873	1281	Gospels	201	Vatopedi Monastery, Skevophylakion, 11	Mount Athos	Greece	
2874	1306	Gospels, Acts, General Epistles, Pauline Epistles	338	Vatopedi Monastery, Skevophylakion, 13	Mount Athos	Greece	
2875	14th	Gospels,	368	Vatopedi Monastery, Skevophylakion, 14	Mount Athos	Greece	
2876	14th	Gospels	183	Vatopedi Monastery, Skevophylakion, 15	Mount Athos	Greece	
2877	14th	Gospels	390	Vatopedi Monastery, Skevophylakion, 17	Mount Athos	Greece	
2878	12th	Luke^{P}	1	Dunham Bible Museum, Houston Baptist University, 09.19	Houston, TX	USA	CSNTM, INTF
2879	12th	Theophylact Commentary on the Gospels	330	Corpus Christi College, Gr. 30	Oxford	United Kingdom	
2880	13th	Luke^{P}, John^{P}	115	Saint Neophytos Monastery, MS 11	Paphos	Cyprus	
2881	11th/12th	Matthew 25:6–15.15–24	1	Yale University Library, Beinecke MS 522	New Haven	USA	CSNTM, INTF, YUL
2882	10th/11th	Gospel of Luke	46	CSNTM	Plano, TX	USA	CSNTM, INTF
2883=[9^{abs}]	15th	Matthew^{P}	118	Bodleian Library, MS. Lyell 95	Oxford	United Kingdom	
2884=[30^{abs}]	15th	Gospels	403	Cambridge University Library, Kk. 5.35	Cambridge	United Kingdom	INTF
2885=[96^{abs}]	1500	John^{P}	71	Castle Library, Ie 14	Krivoklát	Czech Republic	
2886=[205^{abs}]	15th	New Testament	54	Marciana National Library, Gr. Z. 6 (336)	Venice	Italy	INTF
2887=[1160^{abs}]	1888	Theophylact Commentary on the Gospels	537	St. Panteleimon Monastery, 661	Mount Athos	Greece	INTF
2888=[1909^{abs}]	16th	Romans 7:7 - 9:21	103	Bavarian State Library, Cod.graec. 110	Munich	Germany	INTF
2889=[1929^{abs}]	14th	Theophylact Commentary on the Pauline Epistles†	439	Bavarian State Library, Cod.graec. 455	Munich	Germany	BSB, CSNTM, INTF
2890=[1983^{abs}]	13th	Hebrews^{P}	104	Ambrosiana Library, A 241 inf.	Milan	Italy	INTF
2891=[2036^{abs}]	16th	Revelation^{K}	84	Bavarian State Library, Cod.graec. 248	Munich	Germany	INTF
2892	10th	Acts† 7:40-28:31; General Epistles; Romans; 1 Corinthians† 1:24-16:24; 2 Corinthians; Galatians† 1:1-3:5, 4:2-6:18; Ephesians - 1 Thessalonians; 2 Thessalonians 1:1-3:6†; 1 Timothy 1:1-4:8†; Titus† 1:5-3:15; Hebrews	170	The Van Kampen Foundation, VK 908	(Unknown)	USA	CSNTM, INTF
2893	13th	1 Timothy 4:7 - Hebrews 8:8	15	The Van Kampen Foundation, VK 908 fl. 171-185	(Unknown)	USA	CSNTM, INTF
2894	13th	Gospels	312	J. Paul Getty Museum, MS. 65	Malibu, CA	USA	JPGM
2895	17th	Gospels†	288	The Van Kampen Foundation, VK 272	(Unknown)	USA	CSNTM, INTF
2896	11th	Matthew† 6:5-22; Mark	39	The Van Kampen Foundation, VK 862	(Unknown)	USA	CSNTM, INTF
2897	13th	Gospels	220	The Van Kampen Foundation, VK 906	(Unknown)	USA	CSNTM, INTF
2898=[278b]	10th	Matthew† 13:43-17:5	9	National Library, Grec 82, fol. 42-50	Paris	France	BnF, INTF
2899=[858b]	14th	Theophylact Commentary on the Pauline Epistles	250	Vatican Library, Vat.gr.647	Vatican City	Vatican City	INTF
2900	14th	Matthew† 1:17-28:20; Mark; Luke; John	221	Albanian National Archives, ANA 85	Tirana	Albania	CSNTM

[top]

== See also ==
- List of New Testament papyri
- List of New Testament uncials
- List of New Testament minuscules (1–1000)
- List of New Testament minuscules (1001–2000)
- List of New Testament minuscules (2001–)
- List of New Testament minuscules ordered by Location/Institution
- List of New Testament lectionaries

== Bibliography ==
- Aland, Kurt; M. Welte; B. Köster; K. Junack (1994). Kurzgefasste Liste der griechischen Handschriften des Neues Testaments. Berlin, New York: Walter de Gruyter. p. 95. ISBN 3-11-011986-2.
- "Liste Handschriften". Münster: Institute for New Testament Textual Research.
