= Paul Canart =

Belgian librarian and palaeographer (1927–2017)

- Vice Prefect of the Vatican Library
- Installed: February 9, 1994
- Term ended: October 25, 1997
- Predecessor: Mgr José Ruysschaert
- Successor: Dr Ambrogio Maria Piazzoni

Orders
- Ordination: April 1, 1951 by Jozef-Ernest van Roey

Personal details
- Born: October 25, 1927 Cuesmes, Belgium
- Died: September 14, 2017 (aged 89) Brussels, Belgium
- Buried: Forest
- Occupation: Librarian • palaeographer
- Education: KU Leuven (B.Th. • M.A.); Sorbonne University (Ph.D.)
- Alma mater: Sorbonne University

Mgr Paul Georges Lucien Canart (25 October 1927 – 14 September 2017) was a Belgian librarian, palaeographer and Catholic priest who worked at the Vatican Library for nearly sixty years, most notably as Vice Prefect from 1994 to 1997.

== Biography ==
Canart was born in Cuesmes from Georges Achille Bernard (1892–1974) and Marcelle Emilie Luise Canart (née Renders; 1896–1985). He studied at the Catholic University of Leuven, obtaining two baccalauréats (equivalent to B.Th.) — in Thomistic philosophy (1946/1947) and in Theology (1950/1951) — and the licence (M.A.) in Classics (1952/1953). His thesis, supervised by Mgr Augustin Mansion, dealt with the meaning of the term θεῖος [theios] in Plato. During his undergraduate studies, he also entered the local Seminary and was ordained (1951) by Cardinal Jozef-Ernest van Roey (1874–1961), then-Archbishop of Malines. His academic formation was completed with a Ph.D. from the Sorbonne University in 1979, defending a thesis under the title Recherches de paléographie et de philologie byzantines, tutored by Jean Irigoin and judged by Irigoin, Jacques Bompaire (Chair of the committee), José Grosdidier de Matons, Gilbert Dagron, Joseph Mogenet and Jean Darrouzès. He received full marks, the distinction of «très honorable» and the recommendation that the thesis be published.

After a period of teaching in Catholic lyceums in Brussels, on 3 July 1957 he was nominated by Pope Pius XII (through Cardinal Librarian and Archivist Giovanni Mercati) to catalogue the Greek manuscripts of the Vatican collection. The offer caught him off guard because, as he confessed in 2004, before entering the Vatican Library he had never seen a manuscript and his knowledge in Greek palaeography was exclusively theoretical. He also hesitated because, as he himself said in the homily delivered to the mass on the occasion of his ordination's 50th anniversary, he was torn between his Christian faith and spiritual vocation, and his desire to pursue scientific research, which at the time he considered "a layman's job". Canart officially entered the Vatican Library on 1 October 1957, with the start of his appointment delayed by some three months upon his own request. His position, which he initially believed temporary, was soon stabilized.

At the Vatican Library, he was scriptor Graecus (curator of Greek manuscripts) from 1957 and directed the Department of Printed Books (1980–1984) and the Department of Manuscripts (1984–1998). In 1969 he created the Chair of Greek palaeography at the Vatican School of Palaeography and Diplomatics, holding it until 2000. From 1979 to 2000 he also taught at the Vatican School of Library sciences also serving as its Dean (1979–1985). From 9 February 1994 to 25 October 1997 he was Vice Prefect of the Vatican Library, under the term of Leonard Boyle (1984–1997). Canart officially retired on his seventieth birthday, but remained at the Vatican Library for one more year as a consultant, specifically requested by Boyle's successor Card. Raffaele Farina. On 25 October 1998, he ceased from any official duty at the Vatican Library, but continued frequenting it as a private scholar.

From 1993 to 2003 he chaired the Comité international de paléographie grecque, which he also had co-founded in 1980, previously serving as Deputy Chair from 1988 to 1993. He received a number of honours, both ecclesiastical and civil, the last thereof being the Order of Leopold a few weeks before his death.

He had a brother, Jean (born in 1932), and two sisters, nuns Thérèse, of the Sisters of Charity of Jesus and Mary, and Anne-Marie, of the Benedectine nuns of Maredret. In leisure, he was a melomaniac — enjoying opera and prose theatre as well as classical music, Bach in particular — and an avid reader of detective stories and crime and thriller novels, including those of the Salvo Montalbano series by Andrea Camilleri. He died in Brussels in 2017 and was buried in Forest.

== Research activity ==
Canart is recognised as one of the founders of the scientific research trends and methods in Greek palaeography as well as a leading scholar in the field of manuscript cataloguing, a discipline he taught and to which he gave theoretical contributions and guidelines. In fact, he described himself as "d'abord et [...] avant tout un catalogueur de manuscrits grecs" [first and ... foremost, a cataloger of Greek manuscripts].

In his doctoral dissertation — a revision and evaluation of his own researches of 1957–1977 — he defined palaeography and codicology:

French: la paléographie, c'est-à-dire la science de l'écriture, qui étudie de manière raisonnée, à la fois structurale et génétique, le phénomène général de l'écriture, en le replaçant dans son cadre économique, social, politique, idéologique, et la codicologie, ou science du livre manuscrit, qui étudie de la même manière un des produits les plus typiques de la «civilisation de l'écriture».

[palaeography — that is, the science of handwriting, which studies in a reasoned way, at the same time structural and genetic, the general phenomenon of writing, placing it in its economical, social, political, ideological context — and codicology, or the science of the manuscript book, which studies in the same way [as palaeography] one of the most typical products of the «civilization of handwriting»]

— Canart 1980a, p. 569, n. 4

In his researches, he focused on Greek minuscule handwriting from its origins to the Renaissance, and the history of manuscript book as a product of its historical context. Less frequently, he studied Greek hagiography and Byzantine literature.

In his official duties at the Vatican Library, Canart completed the catalogue of Vaticani Graeci 1684–1744, which Ciro Giannelli (1905–1959) had left unfinished, and compiled himself the catalogue of the Greek manuscripts of St. Peter's Archive, of Vaticani Graeci 1745–1962, the second tome of the catalogue of the Barberiniani Graeci (with Leroy and Mogenet) and the catalogue of Greek manuscripts belonged to Cardinal Guglielmo Sirleto (1514–1585) (with Maria Luisa Agati). He also produced a handout of Greek palaeography for his students at the Vatican School of Palaeography, later printed by the School itself. His scholarship in manuscript studies was condensed in a systematic catalogue of scientific publications in the discipline up to 1991.

Canart also edited the facsimile reproduction of Codex Vaticanus (with Carlo Maria Martini), two collections of plates of Greek manuscripts for the study of palaeography, a systematic commentary to Vat. Reg. gr. 1 (a Greek Bible dated to the 10th century), and co-wrote a monograph on codicology. His kleine Schriften were collected and published in two tomes in 2008.

== Publications ==
Full bibliography collected by Agati (2018, pp. 27–44).

=== Books ===
- Canart, P.; Van Camp, J. (1956). Le sense du mot θεῖος ches Platon. Leiden: Presses Universitaires de Louvain. ISBN 978-2-87463-344-7.
- Giannelli, C. (†) (1961). Canart, P. (ed.). Codices Vaticani graeci. Codices 1684–1744. Bibliothecae Apostolicae Vaticanae Codices manuscripti recensiti. Città del Vaticano: Biblioteca Apostolica Vaticana.
- Canart, P.; Martini, C. M. (1965). La Sainte Bible. Le codex Vaticanus graecus 1209 (Codex B). Reproduction en fac-similé sur l'ordre de Sa Sainteté Paul VI. Le Nouveau Testament. Introduction. Città del Vaticano: Biblioteca Apostolica Vaticana.
- Canart, P. (1966). Catalogue des manuscrits grecs de l'Archivio di San Pietro. Studi e Testi, 246. Città del Vaticano: Biblioteca Apostolica Vaticana.
- Canart, P.; Peri, V. (1970). Sussidi bibliografici per i manoscritti greci della Biblioteca Vaticana. Studi e Testi, 261. Città del Vaticano: Biblioteca Apostolica Vaticana.
- Canart, P. (1970). Codices Vaticani graeci. Codices 1745–1962. Bibliothecae Apostolicae Vaticanae Codices manuscripti recensiti. Vol. I. Codicum enarrationes. Città del Vaticano: Biblioteca Apostolica Vaticana.
- Canart, P. (1973). Codices Vaticani graeci. Codices 1745–1962. Bibliothecae Apostolicae Vaticanae Codices manuscripti recensiti. Vol. II. Introductio addenda indices. Città del Vaticano: Biblioteca Apostolica Vaticana.
- Canart, P. (1980). Lezioni paleografia e codicologia greca (PDF). Città del Vaticano: Scuola Vaticana di Paleografia Archivistica e Diplomatica.
- Canart, P.; Leroy, J.; Mogenet, J. (1989). Codices Barberiniani graeci. Bibliothecae Apostolicae Vaticanae Codices manuscripti recensiti. Vol. II. Codices 164–281. Città del Vaticano: Biblioteca Apostolica Vaticana.
- Canart, P. (1991). Paleografia e codicologia greca. Una rassegna bibliografica. Littera antiqua, 7. Città del Vaticano: Biblioteca Apostolica Vaticana.
- Canart, P.; Eleuteri, P., eds. (1991). Scrittura greca nell'umanesimo italiano. Documenti sulle arti del libro, 16. Milan: Il Polifilo.
- Canart, P.; Jacob, A.; Lucà, S.; Perria, L., eds. (1998). Facsimili di codici greci della Biblioteca Vaticana. Exempla scripturarum, 5. Vol. I. Tavole. Città del Vaticano: Biblioteca Apostolica Vaticana.
- Canart, P. (2008). Agati, M. L.; D'Agostino, M. (eds.). Études de paléographie et de codicologie. Studi e Testi, 450–451. Vol. I–II. Città del Vaticano: Biblioteca Apostolica Vaticana. ISBN 9788821008436.
- Canart, P., ed. (2011). La Bible du Patrice Léon: Codex Reginensis Graecus 1. Commentaire codicologique, paléographique, philologique et artistique. Studi e Testi, 463. Città del Vaticano: Biblioteca Apostolica Vaticana. ISBN 978-88-210-0877-1.
- Andrist, P.; Canart, P.; Maniaci, M. (2013). La syntaxe du codex : essai de codicologie structurelle. Bibliologia, 34. Turnhout: Brepols. ISBN 978-2-503-54393-2.
- Agati, M. L.; Canart, P. (†) (2022). I manoscritti greci grammaticali del card. Guglielmo Sirleto (1514-1585): edizione dell'inventario Santamaura e catalogo dei manoscritti identificati. Studi e Testi, 551. Città del Vaticano: Biblioteca Apostolica Vaticana. ISBN 978-88-210-1086-6.

=== Articles ===
- Canart, P. (1959). "Nicéphore Blemmyde et le mémoire adressé aux envoyés de Grégoire IX (Nicée, 1234)". Orientalia Christiana Periodica. 25: 310–325.
- Canart, P. (1961). "Deux fragments inconnus de manuscrits hagiographiques anciens". Analecta Bollandiana. 79: 16–26. doi:10.1484/J.ABOL.4.02468.
- Canart, P. (1961–1962). "Un Crétois scriptor de la Bibliothèque Vaticane: Emmanuel Provataris". Κρητικὰ Χρονικά. 15–16 (2): 84–96.
- Canart, P. (1962a). "Apophtegmes et récits monastiques dans le ms. 33 d'Ochrida". Analecta Bollandiana. 80 (1–2): 22–33. doi:10.1484/J.ABOL.4.01948.
- Canart, P. (1962b). "Michael Synkellos". Lexikon für Theologie und Kirche. Fribourg: Verlag Herder. pp. 400–401.
- Canart, P. (1962c). "Trois manuscrits grecs dans le fonds Patetta de la Bibliothèque Vaticane". Scriptorium. 16 (2): 363–365. doi:10.3406/scrip.1962.3146.
- Canart, P. (1962d). "Un éloge de sainte Euphémie dans le ménologe prémétaphrastique de septembre". Analecta Bollandiana. 80 (3–4): 325–326. doi:10.1484/J.ABOL.4.02064.
- Canart, P. (1962e). "Une nouvelle anthologie monastique : le Vaticanus graecus 2592". Le Muséon. 75: 109–129.
- Canart, P. (1963). "Scribes grecs de la Renaissance. Additions et corrections aux répertoires de Vogel-Gardthausen et de Patrinélis". Scriptorium. 17 (1): 56–82. doi:10.3406/scrip.1963.3165.
- Canart, P. (1964a). "Constantin Rhésinos, théologien populaire et copiste de manuscrits". Studi di bibliografia e di storia in onore di Tammaro de Marinis. Vol. I. Verona: Valdonega. pp. 241–271.
- Canart, P. (1964b). "La deuxième Lettre à Thomas de s. Maxime le Confesseur". Byzantion. 34 (2): 415–445. JSTOR 44169974.
- Canart, P. (1964c). "Les manuscrits copiés par Emmanuel Provataris (1546–1570). Essai d'étude codicologique". Mélanges Eugène Tisserant. Studi e testi, 236. Vol. VI. Città del Vaticano: Biblioteca Apostolica Vaticana. pp. 173–287.
- Canart, P. (1964d). "Nouveaux récits du moine Anastase". Actes du XIIᵉ Congrès International des Études Byzantines. Ochride, 10—16 septembre 1961. Vol. II. Beograd: Comité Yougoslave des Études Byzantines. pp. 263–271.
- Canart, P. (1965a). "Deux autres manuscrits grecs dans le fonds Patetta de la Bibliothèque Vaticane". Scriptorium. 19 (2): 293–296. doi:10.3406/scrip.1965.3250.
- Canart, P. (1965b). "Appendice : Un fragment palimpseste d'un éloge prémétaphrastique de s. Euphémie". In Halkin, F. (ed.). Euphémie de Calcédoine : Légendes byzantines. Subsidia Hagiographica, 41. Bruxelles: Société des Bollandistes. pp. 184–199.
- Canart, P. (1966a). "Le nouveau-né qui dénonce son père. Les avatars d'un conte populaire dans la littérature hagiographique". Analecta Bollandiana. 84 (3–4): 309–333. doi:10.1484/J.ABOL.4.02612.
- Canart, P. (1966b). "Notes sur l'écriture de Nicholas Sophianos". In Vitti, M. (ed.). Nicola Sofianòs e la commedia dei Tre Tiranni di A. Ricchi. Naples: Istituto universitario orientale. pp. 45–47.
- Canart, P. (1966c). "Post-scriptum à «Trois groupes de récits édifiants byzantins»". Byzantion. 36 (2): 382–385. JSTOR 44169212.
- Canart, P. (1966d). "Trois groupes de récits édifiants byzantins". Byzantion. 36 (1): 5–25. JSTOR 44169170.
- Canart, P. (1967a). "Nouveaux inédits de Michel Psellos". Revue des Études Byzantines. 25: 43–60. doi:10.3406/rebyz.1967.1384.
- Canart, P. (1967b). "Symeon Metaphrastes (Logothete)". New Catholic Encyclopedia. Vol. XIII (2nd ed.). Washington, D. C.: The Catholic University of America. p. 875.
- Canart, P. (1967c). "Zigabenus Euthymius". New Catholic Encyclopedia. Vol. XIV (2nd ed.). Washington, D. C.: The Catholic University of America. p. 1120.
- Canart, P. (1969a). "Deux manuscrits hagiographiques dans le fonds Boncompagni-Ludovisi". Analecta Bollandiana. 87 (1–2): 105–108. doi:10.1484/J.ABOL.4.02854.
- Canart, P. (1969b). "Le dossier hagiographique des ss. Baras, Patapios et Raboulas". Analecta Bollandiana. 87 (3–4): 445–459. doi:10.1484/J.ABOL.4.02878.
- Canart, P. (1969c). "Le palimpseste hagiographique du Vaticanus gr. 1810". Analecta Bollandiana. 87 (1–2): 109–114. doi:10.1484/J.ABOL.4.02855.
- Canart, P. (1969d). "Le palimpseste Vaticanus gr. 1876 et la date de la translation de Sainte Euphémie". Analecta Bollandiana. 87 (1–2): 91–104. doi:10.1484/J.ABOL.4.02853.
- Canart, P. (1969e). "Le problème du style d'écriture dit en "as de pique" dans les manuscrits italo-grecs". Atti del 4° Congresso Storico Calabrese. Cosenza: Deputazione di storia patria per la Calabria. pp. 55–69.
- Canart, P. (1969f). "Une épigramme de Théodore Prodrome attribuée à Philostrate". Revue de Philologie, de Littérature et d'Histoire Anciennes. 43: 93–95.
- Canart, P. (1970a). "Alvise Lollino et ses amis grecs". Studi veneziani. 12: 553–587.
- Canart, P. (1970b). "Les inventaires spécialisés de manuscrits grecs". Scriptorium. 24 (1): 112–116. doi:10.3406/scrip.1970.3407.
- Canart, P. (1970c). "Les travaux de Guglielmo Cavallo sur la majuscule grecque". Byzantion. 40 (1): 218–225. JSTOR 44170292.
- Canart, P. (1971a). "En marge de la question aréopagitique. La lettre XI de Denys à Apollophane". Byzantion. 41: 18–27. JSTOR 44170303.
- Canart, P. (1971b). "Florus, martyr d'Illyrie". Dictionnaire d'Histoire et de Géographie Écclesiastique. Vol. XVII. Paris: Letouzey et Ané. pp. 644–645.
- Canart, P. (1971c). "Florent, martyr à Thessalonique". Dictionnaire d'Histoire et de Géographie Écclesiastique. Vol. XVII. Paris: Letouzey et Ané. pp. 585–589.
- Canart, P. (1971d). "Les épigrammes de Thomas Trivizianos". Θησαυρίσματα. 8: 205–248.
- Canart, P. (1971e). "Note sur l'écriture de Michel et Aristobule Apostóles et sur quelques manuscrits attribuables à ce dernier". In Di Lello-Finuoli, A. (ed.). Un esemplare autografo di Arsenio e il Florilegio di Stobeo. Rome: Edizioni dell'Ateneo. pp. 87–101.
- Canart, P. (1972–1973). "Nouveaux manuscrits copiés par Emmanuel Glynzounios". Ἐπετηρὶς Ἑταιρείας τῶν Βυζαντινῶν Σπουδῶν. 39–40: 427–544.
- Canart, P. (1973a). "L'unique exemplaire grec connu de l'œuvre grecque de Thomas Trivizanos". In Maracchi Biagiarelli, B.; Rhodes, D. E. (eds.). Studi offerti a Roberto Ridolfi direttore de «La Bibliofilia». Biblioteca di Bibliografia Italiana, 71. Florence: Leo S. Olschki. pp. 173–195. ISBN 978-88-22-21235-1.
- Canart, P. (1973b). "La carrière ecclesiastique de Jean Nathanaël, chapelain de la communauté grecque de Venise (XVIᵉ siècle)". La Chiesa greca in Italia dall'VIII al XVI secolo. Atti del Convegno Storico Interecclesiale, Bari, 30 aprile - 4 maggio 1969. Italia Sacra, 21. Vol. II. Padova: Antenore. pp. 793–824.
- Canart, P. (1973c). "Recentissimus, non deterrimus. Le texte de la Lettre II de Grégoire de Nysse dans la copie d'Alvise Lollino (cod. Vaticanus gr. 1759)". Zetesis. Bijdragen op het gebied van de klassieke filologie, filosofie, byzantinistiek patrologie en theologie. Album Amicorum aangeboden aan Prof. Dr. Emile De Strijcker naar aanleiding van zijn vijfenzestigste verjaardag. Antwerp – Utrecht: De Nederlandse Boekhandel. pp. 717–731.
- Canart, P. (1974a). "Notes sur quelques manuscrits grecs des bibliothèques de Pologne". In Heller, J. L.; Newman, J. K. (eds.). Serta Turyniana. Studies in Greek Literature and Palaeography in Honor of Alexander Turyn. Urbana – Chicago – London: University of Illinois Press. pp. 547–563.
- Canart, P. (1974b). "Thomas Trivizianos le Crétois et Thomas Trevisan le Vénitien". Πεπραγμένα του Γ' Διεθνούς Κρητολογικού Συνεδρίου (Ρέθυμνον, 18–23 Σεπτεμβρίου 1971). Vol. II. Εν Αθηναΐς: χ. ο. pp. 29–31.
- Canart, P. (1975). "La paléographie grecque et byzantine. Colloque international du Centre national de la Recherche scientifique – Paris, 21-25 octobre 1974". Scriptorium. 29 (2): 167–175. doi:10.3406/scrip.1975.1108.
- Canart, P.; Jacob, A.; Leroy, J. (1976). "Recherches sur les manuscrits grecs de l'Italie méridionale". Actes du XIVᵉ Congrès International des Études Byzantines, Bucarest, 6-12 septembre 1971. Budapest: s.l. pp. 63–66.
- Canart, P. (1977a). "Identification et différenciation de mains à l'époque de la Renaissance". La paléographie grecque et byzantine. Colloques internationaux du C.N.R.S., 559. Paris: Éditions du C.N.R.S. pp. 363–369.
- Canart, P. (1977b). "Jean Nathanaël et le commerce des manuscrits grecs à Venise". In Beck, H. G.; Manoussacas, M.; Pertusi, A. (eds.). Venezia centro di mediazione tra Oriente e Occidente (secoli XV–XVI). Aspetti e problemi. Atti del II Convegno internazionale di Storia della Civiltà veneziana. Civiltà Veneziana. Studi, 32. Vol. II. Florence: Leo S. Olschki. pp. 417–438. ISBN 978-88-22-21416-4.
- Canart, P. (1977c). "Un copiste expansif : Jean Sévère de Lacédémone". In Treu, K.; Dummer, J.; Irmscher, J.; Paschke, F. (eds.). Studia Codicologica. Texte und Untersuchungen zur Geschichte der altchristlichen Literatur, 124. Berlin: Akademie-Verlag. pp. 117–139. doi:10.1515/9783112764671-008. ISBN 978-3-11-276467-1.
- Canart, P. (1977d). "Un style d'écriture livresque dans les manuscrits chypriotes du XIVᵉ siècle: la chypriote "bouclée"". La paléographie grecque et byzantine. Colloques internationaux du C.N.R.S., 559. Paris: Éditions du C.N.R.S. pp. 303–321.
- Canart, P.; Leroy, J. (1977). "Les manuscrits en style de Reggio. Étude paléographique et codicologique". La paléographie grecque et byzantine. Colloques internationaux du C.N.R.S., 559. Paris: Éditions du C.N.R.S. pp. 241–261.
- Canart, P.; Samaran, Ch. (1977). "Description codicologique – terminologie des écritures. Table ronde". La paléographie grecque et byzantine. Colloques internationaux du C.N.R.S., 559. Paris: Éditions du C.N.R.S. pp. 543–561.
- Canart, P. (1977–1979). "Démétrius Damilas, alias le "librarius Florentinus"". Rivista di studi bizantini e neoellenici. 14–16: 281–347.
- Canart, P. (1978). "Le livre grec en Italie méridionale sous les règnes Normand et Souabe : aspects matériels et sociaux". Scrittura e Civiltà. 2: 103–162.
- Canart, P. (1979a). "Le patriarche Méthode de Constantinople copiste à Rome". Palaeographica Diplomatica et Archivistica. Studi in onore di Giulio Battelli. Raccolta di studi e testi, 140. Rome: Edizioni di Storia e Letterature. pp. 343–353.
- Canart, P. (1979b). "Nouvelles recherches et nouveaux instruments de travail dans le domaine de la codicologie". Scrittura e Civiltà. 3: 267–307.
- Canart, P. (1979c). "Une forme particulière de kappa cursif dans quelques souscriptions de manuscrits grecs". In Cockshaw, P.; Garand, M. C.; Jodogne, P. (eds.). Miscellanea codicologica F. Masai dicata. Les publications de «Scriptorium», 8. Vol. I. Gand: Story-Scientia. pp. 115–121.
- Canart, P. (1980a). "De la catalographie à l'histoire du livre. Vingt ans de recherches sur les manuscrits grecs". Byzantion. 50 (2): 563–616. JSTOR 44171382.
- Canart, P. (1980b). "Les papyri grecs de la Bibliothèque Vaticane et du Musée Egyptien du Vatican. Histoire et inventaire". In Pintaudi, R. (ed.). Miscellanea papyrologica. Papyrologica Florentina, 7. Florence: Gonnelli. pp. 371–390.
- Canart, P.; Marcou, G. S. (1980). "Ὁ αὐτόγραφος Νομοκάνων (Νόμιμον) τοῦ Μανουὴλ Μαλαξοῦ". Πρακτικὰ Τῆς Ἀκαδημίας Ἀθηνῶν. 55: 290–303.
- Canart, P. (1981a). "Les cotes du manuscrit palatin de l'Anthologie". Scriptorium. 35 (2): 227–240. doi:10.3406/scrip.1981.1214.
- Canart, P. (1981b). "Les écritures livresques chypriotes du milieu du Xlᵉ siècle au milieu du XIIIᵉ et le style palestino-chypriote epsilon". Scrittura e Civiltà. 5: 17–76.
- Canart, P.; Prato, G. (1981). "Les recueils organisés par Jean Chortasménos et le problème de ses autographes". In Hunger, H. (ed.). Studien zum Patriarchatsregister von Konstantinopel. Österreichischen Akademie der Wissenschaften. Philosophisch-historische Klasse. Sitzungsberichte, 383. Wien: Verlag der Österreichischen Akademie der Wissenschaften. pp. 115–178.
- Canart, P. (1982a). "À propos du Vaticanus Graecus 207. Le recueil scientifique d'un érudit Constantinopolitan du XIIIᵉ siècle et l'emploi du papier "à zig-zag" dans la capitale byzantine". ICS. 7 (2): 271–298. JSTOR 23062400.
- Canart, P. (1982b). "Aspetti materiali e sociali della produzione libraria italo-greca tra Normanni e Svevi?". In Cavallo, G. (ed.). Libri e lettori nel mondo bizantino. Guida storica e critica. Rome – Bari: Laterza. pp. 103–153.
- Canart, P. (1982c). "Cinq manuscrits transférés directement du monastère de Stoudios à celui de Grottaferrata?". In Faraggiana di Sarzana, C.; Mazzucchi, C. M. (eds.). Bisanzio e l'Italia. Raccolta di studi in memoria di Agostino Pertusi. Scienze filologiche e letteratura, 22. Milan: Vita e pensiero. pp. 19–28.
- Canart, P. (1982d). "La collection hagiographique palimpseste du Palatinus graecus 205 et la Passion de S. Georges BHG 670g". Analecta Bollandiana. 100: 87–109. doi:10.1484/J.ABOL.4.01987.
- Canart, P.; Pintaudi, E. (1984). "PSI XVII Congr.5: Un système d'oracles chrétiens (Sortes sanctorum)". Zeitschrift für Papyrologie und Epigraphik. 57: 85–90. JSTOR 20184119.
- Canart, P. (1999). "Observations sur les papiers non filigranés des manuscrits grecs de la Bibliothèque Vaticane". In Zerdoun Bat-Yehouda, M. (ed.). Le papier au Moyen Âge: histoire et techniques. Bibliologia, 19. Vol. 19. Turnhout: Brepols. pp. 55–60. doi:10.1484/M.BIB-EB.3.4843. ISBN 978-2-503-50941-9.
- Canart, P.; Payne, Ph. B. (2000). "The Originality of Text-Critical Symbols in Codex Vaticanus". Novum Testamentum. 42 (2): 105–113. doi:10.1163/156853600506799. JSTOR 1561327.
- Canart, P.; Pintaudi, R. (2004–2005). "Il martirio di san Pasofio. Edizione critica". APapyrol. 16–17: 189–245.
- Canart, P. (2005a). "À propos du Sermo de sanctissimae Dei genitricis virginis Mariae laudibus d'Ephrem le Syrien". Byzantion. 75: 499–500. JSTOR 44173008.
- Canart, P. (2005b). "Cinquante ans à la Bibliothèque vaticane". Le Livre et l'Estampe. 51: 7–28.
- Canart, P. (2005c). "Dans l'orbite du livre médiéval : Deux itinéraires codicologiques". Gazette du Livre Médiéval. 46: 1–11. doi:10.3406/galim.2005.1664.
- Canart, P. (2005d). "L'ornamentazione dei manoscritti greci del Rinascimento: un criterio d'attribuzione da sfruttare?". Rivista di Studi Bizantini e Neoellenici. New Series. 42: 203–222.
- Canart, P. (2006a). "Il registro notarile di Parente di Stupio. Il segno dello zigzag nel manoscritto". In Carrarini, R.; Casetti Brach, C. (eds.). Libri carte. Restauri e analisi diagnostiche. Quaderni, 1. Rome: Istituto Centrale per la Patologia del Libro. pp. 47–53.
- Canart, P. (2006b). "La paléographie est-elle un art ou une science?". Scriptorium. 60 (2): 159–185. doi:10.3406/scrip.2006.3939.
- Canart, P. (2006c). "Les "morceaux choisis" de Psellos du Vaticanus graecus 712". Bollettino dei Classici. 27: 3–14.
- Agati, M. L.; Canart, P. (2006). "Le palimpseste du Vaticanus graecus 770 et du Cryptensis A. Δ. 6 (gr. 389)". Νέα Ῥώμη. 3: 131–156.
- Canart, P. (2007a). "A propos de la collaboration entre copistes byzantins. Note sur le critère des "raccords imparfaits"". S&T. 5: 421–423.
- Canart, P. (2007b). "Consigli fraterni a giovani catalogatori di libri manoscritti". Gazette du Livre Médiéval. 50: 1–13. doi:10.3406/galim.2007.1735.
- Agati, M. L.; Canart, P. (2009). "Copie et reliure dans la Rome des premières décennies du XVIᵉ siècle. Autour du Cardinal's Shop". Scripta. 2: 9–38. JSTOR 26490571.
- Canart, P. (2010a). "La descrizione dei manoscritti greci. Riflessioni di un catalogatore 'tradizionalista'". In Crisci, E.; Maniaci, M.; Orsini, P. (eds.). La descrizione dei manoscritti: esperienze a confronto. Studi e ricerche del Dipartimento di Filologia e Storia, 1. Cassino: Università degli Studi di Cassino e del Lazio meridionale. pp. 71–90. ISBN 978-88-904713-0-8.
- Canart, P. (2010b). "Pour un répertoire des anthologies scolaires commentées de la période des Paléologues". In Bravo García, A.; Pérez Marín, I. (eds.). The Legacy of Bernard de Montfaucon: Three Hunderd Years of Studies on Greek Handwriting: Proceedings of the Seventh International Colloquium of Greek Palaeography (Madrid-Salamanca, 15-20 September 2008). Bibliologia, 31. Vol. 31. Turnhout: Brepols. pp. 449–462. doi:10.1484/M.BIB-EB.3.4545. ISBN 978-2-503-53520-3.
- Canart, P. (2010c). "Un manuscrit provincial de datation problématique (Vat. gr. 2561) et deux épigrammes sur l'évangéliste Matthieu". Νέα Ῥώμη. 7: 317–365.
- Andrist, P.; Canart, P.; Maniaci, M. (2010). "L'analyse structurelle du codex, clef de sa genèse et de son histoire". In Bravo García, A.; Pérez Marín, I. (eds.). The Legacy of Bernard de Montfaucon: Three Hunderd Years of Studies on Greek Handwriting: Proceedings of the Seventh International Colloquium of Greek Palaeography (Madrid-Salamanca, 15-20 September 2008). Bibliologia, 31. Turnhout: Brepols. pp. 289–299. doi:10.1484/M.BIB-EB.3.4533. ISBN 978-2-503-53520-3.
- Canart, P.; di Lorenzo, A. (2015). "Frammenti di un Mineo di agosto nell'Archivio Carrano di Teggiano". Orientalia Christiana Periodica. 81 (1): 17–82.
- Canart, P. (†) (2017). "Manuscrits de Terre d'Otrante inconnus et moins connus". Rudiae. N. S. 3: 13–41. doi:10.1285/i11245344v2017n3p13.

== Fellowships and Honours ==
As listed by Agati (2018, pp. 26–27).

- Chaplain of His Holiness (by Pope Paul VI, 1964).
- Prelate of Honour of His Holiness (by Pope Paul VI, 1976).
- Protonotary apostolic ad instar participantium (by Pope John Paul II, 1998).
- Official of the Order of Leopold (by King Philippe of Belgium, 2017).
- Comité international de paléographie grecque (co-founder, 1980; Deputy Chair, 1988–1993; Chair, 1993–2003).
- Committee of the Holy See for Byzantine Studies (Chair and co-founder, 1978–2011).
- Fellow of the Latinitas Foundation (until 1997).
- Fellow of the Lambert Darchis Foundation (Rome).
- Member of the Commissione Italiana Indici e Cataloghi (until 1998).
- Member of the Commissione Italiana Tutela e Restauro dei Beni Librari (until 1997).
- Member of the Comitato per l'edizione nazionale dei classici greci e latini (Accademia dei Lincei).
- Fellow, Societé belge d'études byzantines.
- Foreign fellow, Accademia dei Lincei (28 July 1987).
- Honorary fellow, Ἐπετηρὶς Ἑταιρείας τῶν Βυζαντινῶν Σπουδῶν (Athens).
- Honorary fellow, Istituto Veneto di Scienze, Lettere e Arti (Venice).

Canart was honoured with a Festschrift for his seventieth birthday and contemporary retirement, in 1997, and three Gedenkschriften following his passing.

== Bibliography ==
- Agati, M. L. (2018). "Paul Canart. Una vita per i manoscritti". Byzantion. 88: 5–44. JSTOR 10.2307/26768989.
- Bougard, F. (2017-09-22). "Décès de Monseigneur Paul Canart". Les carnets de l'IRHT. doi:10.58079/qi14.
- Cacouros, M.; Sautel, J.-H., eds. (2021). Des cahiers à l'histoire de la culture en Byzance: hommage à Paul Canart, codicologue (1927–2017). Orientalia Lovaniensia Analecta, 306 • Bibliothèque de Byzantion, 27. Leuven: Peeters. ISBN 978-90-429-4681-1.
- Cavallo, G. (1967a). "Osservazioni paleografiche sul canone e la cronologia della cosiddetta onciale romana". ASNP. S. II. 36 (3–4): 209–220. JSTOR 24300180.
- Cavallo, G. (1967b). Ricerche sulla maiuscola biblica. Studi e testi di papirologia, 2. Vol. I–II. Florence: Le Monnier.
- D'Agostino, M.; Pieralli, L., eds. (2021). Φιλόδωρος εὐμενείας. Miscellanea di studi in ricordo di Mons. Paul Canart. Littera antiqua, 21. Città del Vaticano: Scuola Vaticana di Paleografia Archivistica e Diplomatica. ISBN 978-88-85054-28-8.
- Lucà, S.; Perria, L., eds. (1997–1999). Ὀπώρα. Studi in onore di mgr Paul Canart per il LXX compleanno. Bollettino della Badia Greca di Grottaferrata (N. S.), 51–53. Vol. I–III. Grottaferrata: Badia Greca di Grottaferrata.
- Maniaci, M. (2017). "Paul Canart (1927-2017)". GLM. 63: 205–106.
- Pasini, C. (2022). "Paul Canart, sessant'anni alla Biblioteca Vaticana". Libri, scritture e testi greci 2022. pp. 25–85.
- Pasini, C.; D'Aiuto, F., eds. (2022). Libri, scritture e testi greci. Giornata di studio in ricordo di mons. Paul Canart organizzata dalla biblioteca apostolica Vaticana e dal comitato Vaticano di Studi bizantini (Città del Vaticano, 21 settembre 2018). Studi e Testi, 554. Città del Vaticano: Biblioteca Apostolica Vaticana. ISBN 978-88-210-1091-0.
- Pasini, C.; D'Aiuto, F. (2022). "Premessa". Libri, scritture e testi greci 2022. pp. 7–8.
- Patrinelis, Ch. G. (1958–1959). "Ἕλληνες κωδικογράφοι τῶν χρόνων τῆς ἀναγεννήσεως". Ἐπετερὶς τῶν Μεσαιωνικοῦ Ἀρχείου. 8–9: 63–125.
- Perria, L. (2011). Γραφίς. Per una storia della scrittura libraria greca (secoli IV a.C. – XVI d.C.). Quaderni di «Νέα Ῥώμη», 1. Roma – Città del Vaticano: Università di Roma «Tor Vergata» – Biblioteca Apostolica Vaticana. ISBN 978-88-210-0887-0.
- Vogel, M.; Gardthausen, V. (1909). Die griechischen Schreiber des Mittelalters und der Renaissance. Zentralblatt für Bibliothekswesen—Beiheft, 33. Leipzig: Harrassowitz.
