= Schøyen Collection =

Private manuscript collections located in Oslo and London

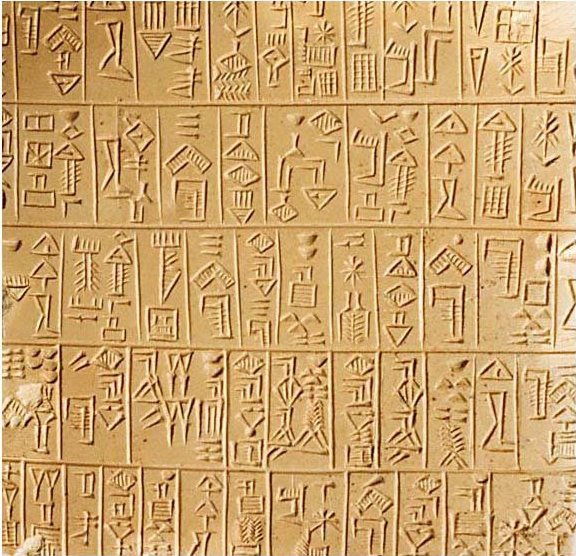
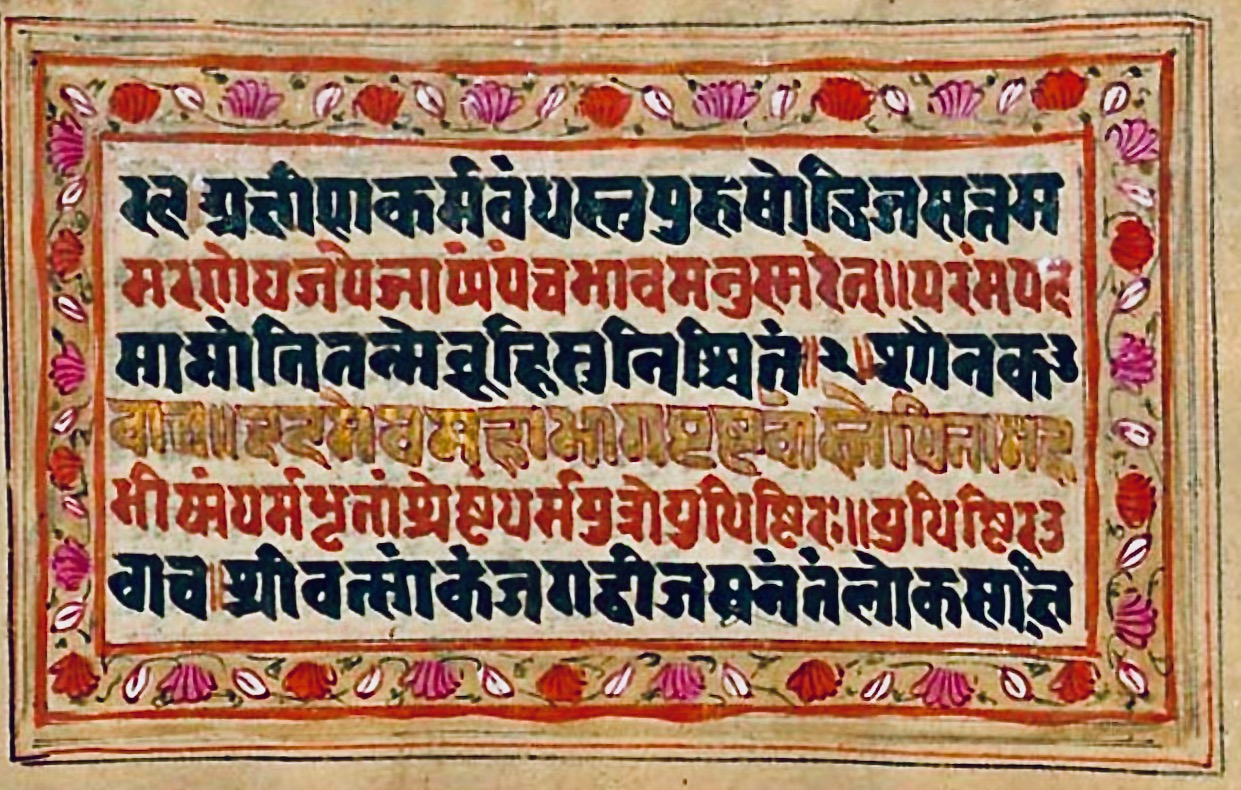
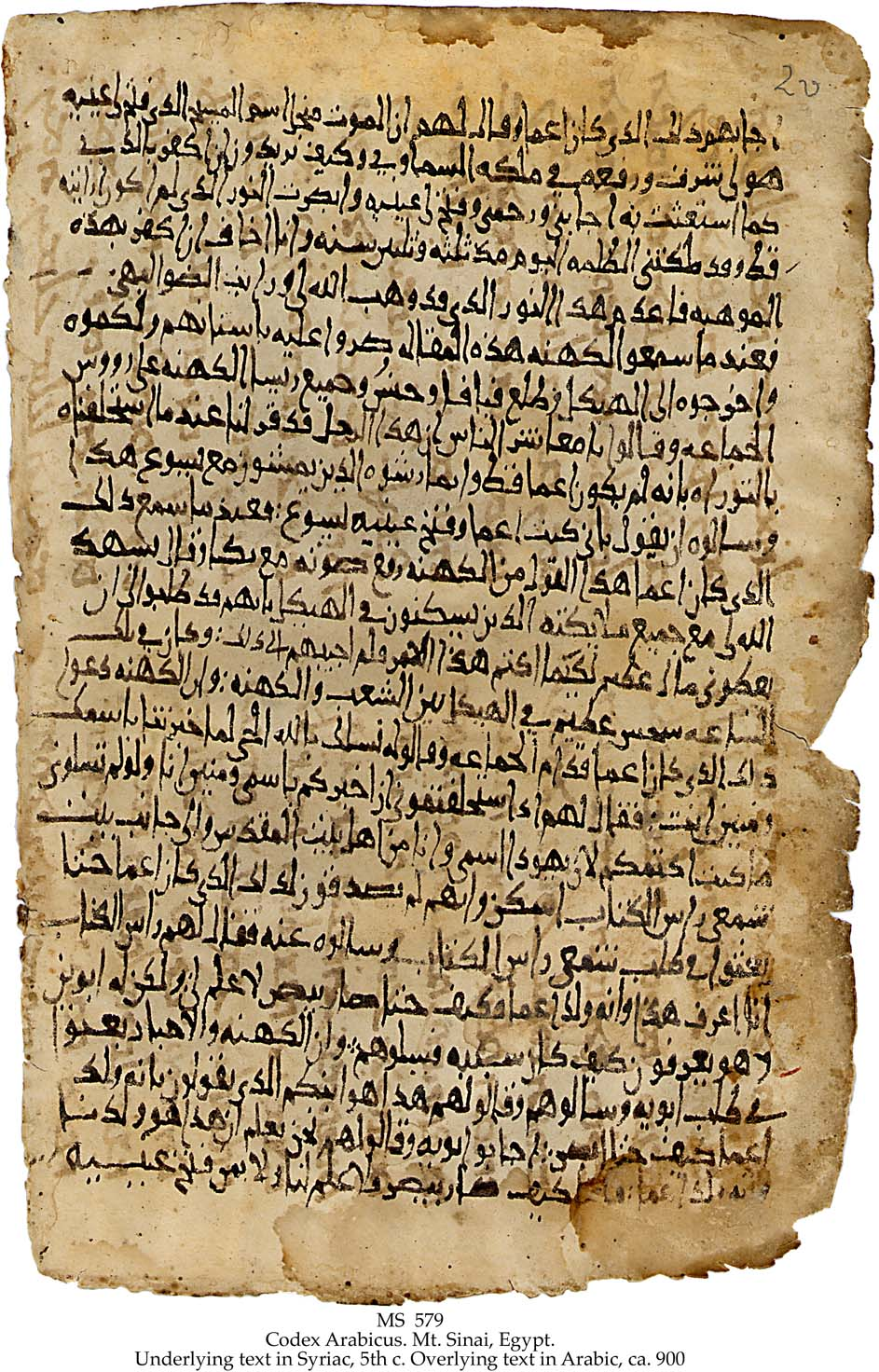
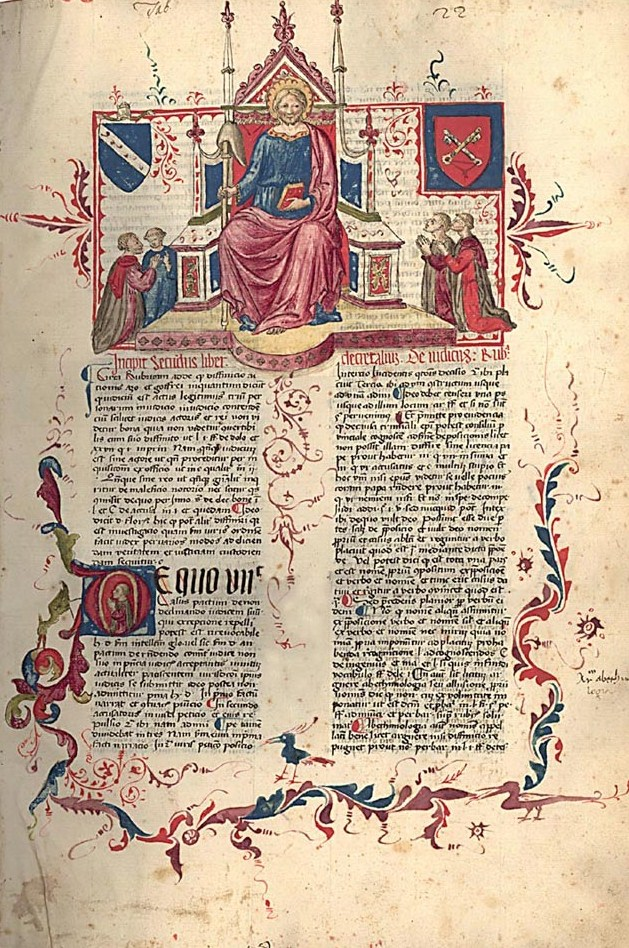
Some manuscript folios in the Schøyen Collection, from 26th-century BC to 15th-century AD texts

The Schøyen Collection is one of the largest private manuscript collections in the world, mostly located in Oslo and London. Formed in the 20th century by the father of current owner Martin Schøyen, it comprises manuscripts of global provenance, spanning 5,000 years of history. It contains more than 13,000 manuscript items; the oldest is about 5,300 years old. There are manuscripts from 134 different countries and territories, representing 120 languages and 185 scripts.

The Collection procures and preserves diverse manuscripts, from all over the world, irrespective of the geography, culture, linguistic, race and religious background. It declares that its interest is in "advancing the study of human culture and civilization" over many millennia. Some of its recent acquisitions have been obtained from the civil war-affected regions of the Middle East and Afghanistan, where warlords and smugglers have destroyed ancient sites to find a buyer for ancient manuscript fragments and artifacts.

== Acquisition concerns ==
Certain items in the Schøyen Collection may have been acquired through the black market transactions which encourage further reckless destruction of ancient sites, illegal abuse of heritage sites, and the financing of terrorists or civil war chieftains. Iraq and Afghanistan, for example, have sought a return of certain recently acquired items in the Schøyen Collection. The Collection states that it "strongly supports a tough regime for cultural protection", makes active effort towards pro-active compliance with the law and is an "ethical private collector in preserving the heritage of all mankind". This concern has also been raised about the provenance of various cuneiform materials held by the Schøyen Collection that are considered by some to be tainted cultural property.

=== Incantation bowls ===
The 654 Aramaic incantation bowls were alleged to belong to Iraq, alleged to have been stolen after August 1990, taken to Jordan, resold by a local art dealer named Ghassan Rihani, and through intermediaries purchased by the Collection. The Schøyen Collection then provided University College London the bowls for an academic study. Activists alleged in 2003 that the items were stolen from Iraq and illegally traded, and it must be returned to Iraq. The University set up a panel to investigate the claims in 2004, and the Schøyen Collection sued the University for the bowls. The Schøyen Collection denied that these bowls were stolen or smuggled, providing official documents issued by the government of Jordan as evidence that the Jordanian source owned it prior to 1965. University College London settled, paid an undisclosed amount in compensation, suppressed its own report on the provenance of the bowls, and returned the items back to the Schøyen Collection.

== Notable manuscripts ==
The Schøyen Collection preserves some of the oldest known archaeological discoveries and manuscripts.

=== Ancient world ===
- MS 1717 (31st century BC), The Kushim Tablet, a Sumerian cuneiform record of beer production, signed by possibly the first example of a person named in writing
- MS 2064 (21st century BC), Ur-Nammu's law-code, a Sumerian text.
- MS 2781 (2000–1600 BC), a Babylonian calendar.
- Tutankhamun's signet ring
- MS 108 "The earliest Greek Alphabet” copper,, Cyprus, ca. 800 BC, 2 tablets, 21x13 cm, single column, (19x10 cm), 20-23 lines in archaic Greek capitals with some North Semitic (Phoenician) letter forms by 2 or more scribes.
- MS 5236, an ancient Greek block print from the 6th century BC
- Ancient Buddhist and Hindu manuscripts likely recovered from recently destroyed Buddhist sites such as Bamiyan in Afghanistan and other Buddhist monastery ruins in northwest Pakistan since the 1990s.
- MS 193 (3rd century AD), The Crosby-Schøyen Codex, biblical manuscript in the Coptic language; it contains: Jonah, 2 Maccabees, 1 Peter, "Peri Pascha" of Melito, and an unidentified Homily. It is thought to be one of the oldest existing books.
- MS 2650 (4th century AD), Codex Schøyen, the oldest Gospel of Matthew in Coptic dialect
- Since 1994, the Schøyen Collection has acquired 115 Dead Sea Scrolls fragments from 15 different scrolls.
- MS 035, Codex Sinaiticus Zosimi Rescriptus, a palimpsest on vellum from Mount Sinai
- MLSC 2, The Descent of Iauar, a Mandaic lead amulet
- Greek papyri, three volumes of which have been edited by Rosario Pintaudi and other scholars.

=== Medieval and modern era ===
- MS 1 (c. 1300), a fragment from a codex of French sermons, in a binding produced by Manuale del Navarro, acquired in 1955
- MS 4457 (1865-1879 AD), Cheyenne Chief Little Shield's Ledger Book recording the Indian War of the Platte River in 1865.
- Manuscripts related to Buddhism, Hinduism, Jainism and Sikhism

== See also ==
- Curse bowl
