= Giovan Battista Alberti =

Italian classical scholars (1930–2014)

Giovan Battista Alberti (1930 – 28 October 2014) was an Italian classical scholar, professor at the University of Florence.

A student of Vittorio Bartoletti and Giorgio Pasquali, Alberti taught Greek Palaeography and Classical Philology at the University of Florence. His main interest was in textual criticism of Greek classics and in their manuscript transmission, with special interest for Apollonius of Rhodes, Herodotus and Thucydides. His monographs include a handbook on textual criticism of Greek and Latin classics, with theoretical remarks, and a complete critical edition of Thucydides. He was thesis advisor to Rosario Pintaudi.

Alberti died on 28 October 2014.

== Publications ==
- Alberti, G. B. (1957). "Questioni tucididee (I–III)". BENC. N. S. 5: 15–23.
- Alberti, G. B. (1957). "Tucidide nella traduzione latina di Lorenzo Valla". SIFC. N. S. 29 (2): 224–249.
- Alberti, G. B. (1958). "Pausania I, iv, 5". Maia. N. S. 10 (3): 1.
- Alberti, G. B. (1958). "Questioni tucididee (IV–VIII)". BENC. N. S. 6: 41–59.
- Alberti, G. B. (1959). "Erodoto nella traduzione latina di Lorenzo Valla". BENC. N. S. 7: 65–84.
- Alberti, G. B. (1959). "Il codice Laurenziano LXX, 6 e la traduzione latina di Erodoto di Lorenzo Valla". Maia. N. S. 11 (4): 315–319.
- Alberti, G. B. (1959). "L'uso di particelle nella formula di correlazione πρῶτον ... ἔπειτα". Maia. N. S. 11 (1): 44–62.
- Alberti, G. B. (1960). "Autografi greci di Lorenzo Valla nel Codice Vaticano greco 122". IMU. 3: 287–290.
- Alberti, G. B. (1960). "Note ad alcuni manoscritti di Erodoto". Maia. N. S. 12 (4): 331–345.
- Alberti, G. B. (1961). "Macrobio e il testo del Somnium Scipionis". SIFC. 33 (2): 163–184.
- Alberti, G. B. (1962). "Questioni tucididee (IX–XII)". BENC. N. S. 10: 27–38.
- Alberti, G. B. (1963). "Le nuove Membranae multinenses con frammenti di Apollonio Rodio ed Anastasio Sinaita". BENC. 11: 15–23.
- Alberti, G. B. (1963). "Note al testo di Tucidide". Maia. N. S. 15 (2): 129–135.
- Alberti, G. B. (1966). "[Herodes], περὶ πολιτείας, 21-22". Maia. N. S. 18 (1): 1.
- Alberti, G. B. (1967). "Questioni tucididee (XIII–XIV)". BENC. N. S. 15: 1–16.
- Alberti, G. B. (1968). "«Recensione chiusa» e «recensione aperta»". SIFC. 40 (1–2): 44–60.
- Alberti, G. B. (1970). "Marsilio Ficino e il codice Riccardiano 581". Rinascimento. S. II. 10: 187–193.
- Alberti, G. B. (1970). "Massimo Planude traduttore del Somnium Scipionis". Studia Florentina Alexandro Ronconi sexagenario oblata. Rome: Edizioni dell'Ateneo. pp. 7–15.
- Alberti, G. B. (1972). "Note alla tradizione manoscritta di Apollonio Rodio". Studi in onore di Quintino Cataudella. Vol. II. Catania: Università. pp. 9–18.
- Alberti, G. B. (1975). "Recenti studi sulla tradizione manoscritta Tucididea". Atene e Roma. N. S. 20: 3–16.
- Alberti, G. B. (1979). Problemi di critica testuale. Florence: La Nuova Italia.
- Alberti, G. B. (1980). "Noterelle Tucididee". Atene e Roma. N. S. 26 (1–2): 15–22.
- Alberti, G. B. (1982). "Ancora sulla famiglia β di Erodoto". Studi in onore di Aristide Colonna. Perugia: Università. pp. 1–6.
- Alberti, G. B. (1982). "Note critico-testuali in margine ad Ennio tragico". Atene e Roma. N. S. 28 (3–4): 160–163.
- Alberti, G. B. (1983). "I papiri e l'"archetipo" di Erodoto". Prometheus. 9 (3): 193–196. doi:10.14601/prometheus-19085.
- Alberti, G. B. (1985). "Lorenzo Valla traduttore di Tucidide". In Cardini, R.; Cesarini Martinelli, L.; Garin, E.; Pascucci, G. (eds.). Tradizione classica e letteratura umanistica: per Alessandro Perosa. Rome: Bulzoni. pp. 243–253.
- Alberti, G. B. (1988). "Ancora sul codice Vat. gr. 2203 di Tucidide". BollClass. 9: 84–88.
- Alberti, G. B. (1994). "Lo stemma codicum di Martino di Braga". In Burini, Cl. (ed.). Paideia cristiana. Studi in onore di Mario Naldini. Rome: Gruppo Editoriale Internazionale. pp. 147–152.
- Alberti, G. B. (1994). "Thuc. VII 27,2". Studi Classici e Orientali. 42: 15–16. JSTOR 24184085.
- Alberti, G. B. (1996). "Il paleotipo di Sofocle". Prometheus. 22 (2): 101–102. doi:10.14601/prometheus-16748.
- Alberti, G. B. (1998). "Ancora sulla tradizione manoscritta erodotea". BollClass. 19: 3–8.
- Alberti, G. B. (1999). "Alcuni recentiores di Erodoto". BollClass. 20: 3–10.
- Alberti, G. B. (2001). "Il paleotipo di Apollonio Rodio". Prometheus. 27 (3): 219–232. doi:10.14601/prometheus-16614.
- Alberti, G. B. (2002). "Noterelle erodotee". BollClass. 23: 3–8.
- Alberti, G. B. (2004). "Puntualizzazioni tucididee". BollClass. 25: 111–120.
- Alberti, G. B. (2005). "Dialogando filologicamente con Timpanaro". In Ghidetti, E.; Pagnini, A. (eds.). Sebastiano Timpanaro e la cultura del secondo Novecento. Raccolta di studi e testi, 222. Rome: Edizioni di Storia e Letteratura. pp. 227–233. doi:10.1400/50843. ISBN 978-88-8-4982-131.
- Alberti, G. B. (2007). "Retractationes erodotee (con qualche precisazione)". Prometheus. 33 (2): 115–116. doi:10.14601/prometheus-19085.
- Alberti, G. B. (2007). "Riflessioni filologiche di un vecchio tucidideo". Prometheus. 33 (3): 277–279. doi:10.14601/prometheus-13032.
- Alberti, G. B. (2010). "Altre note di un vecchio tucidideo". Prometheus. 36 (1): 87–89. doi:10.14601/prometheus-11394.
- Alberti, G. B. (2012). "Precisazioni sullo stemma tucidideo". In Bastianini, G.; Lapini, W.; Tulli, M. (eds.). Harmonia. Scritti di filologia classica in onore di Angelo Casanova. Studi e saggi, 109. Vol. I. Florence: University Press. pp. 9–11. doi:10.1400/205603. ISBN 978-88-6655-172-0.
- Thucydides (1972). Alberti, G. B. (ed.). Historiae. Vol. I. Romae: Typis Officinae Polygraphicae.
- Thucydides (1992). Alberti, G. B. (ed.). Historiae. Vol. II. Romae: Typis Officinae Polygraphicae.
- Thucydides (2000). Alberti, G. B. (ed.). Historiae. Vol. III. Romae: Typis Officinae Polygraphicae.

== Bibliography ==
- Carlini, A. (2019). "Medea Norsa e Vittorio Bartoletti alla Scuola Normale Superiore di Pisa". In Minutoli, D. (ed.). Ricordo di Vittorio Bartoletti a cinquant'anni dalla scomparsa (1967-2017). Margaritae, 4. Florence: Accademia Fiorentina di Papirologia e di Studi sul Mondo Antico. pp. 19–34. ISBN 978-88-908752-6-7.
- Gómez Pallarés, J. (1983). "Review of Alberti 1979". Faventia. 5 (1): 105–107.
- Irigoin, J. (1980). "Review of Alberti 1979". Revue des Études Grecques. 93 (440–441): 281–282. JSTOR 44262503.
- Kleinlogel, A. (1977). "Review of Thucydides 1972". Gnomon. 49 (8): 754–773. JSTOR 27686848.
- Kleinlogel, A. (1998). "Review of Thucydides 1992". Gnomon. 70 (4): 289–299. JSTOR 27692772.
- Kleinlogel, A. (2004). "Review of Thucydides 2000". Gnomon. 76 (1): 4–15. JSTOR 40493929.
- Liénard, E. (1980). "Review of Alberti 1979". L'Antiquité Classique. 49: 479–482. JSTOR 41652080.
- Pintaudi, R. (2014-11-15). "Ricordo di G. B. Alberti" (PDF). Notiziario Italiano di Antichistica: 4–5.
- Tosi, R. (1995). "Review of Thucydides 1992". Eikasmos. 6: 406–412.
- Tosi, R. (2002). "Review of Thucydides 2000". Eikasmos. 11: 441–447.
- Toti, A. (2016). "Ricordo di Giovan Battista Alberti". Maia. N. S. 68 (1): 121–124.
