= Minuscule 278a =

- New Testament manuscript
- Text: Gospels
- Date: 1072
- Script: Greek
- Now at: Bibliothèque nationale de France
- Size: 20.2 cm by 15 cm
- Type: Byzantine text-type
- Category: V
- Note: full marginalia

Minuscule 278a (in the Gregory-Aland numbering), ε 1088 (Soden), is a Greek minuscule manuscript of the New Testament, on parchment. It is dated by a colophon to the year 1072. It has full marginalia.

== Description ==
The codex contains the text of the four Gospels on 305 parchment leaves (20.2 cm by 15 cm), with one lacunae (Matthew 13:43-17:5). The text is written in one column per page, in 21 lines per page.

The text is divided according to the κεφαλαια (chapters), whose numbers are given at the margin, and their τιτλοι (titles of chapters) at the top of the pages. There is also another division according to the smaller Ammonian Sections (in Mark 234, the last section in 16:9), with references to the Eusebian Canons (written below Ammonian Section numbers).

It contains the Epistula ad Carpianum, Eusebian Canon tables, lectionary markings at the margins, synaxaria, Menologion, Armenian inscriptions, and pictures. Matthew 13:43-17:5 was written by another, earlier hand in the 10th century. According to Scrivener it was a later hand. This part now is classified separately and designated by 278b according to the numbering of Gregory-Aland.

== Text ==
The Greek text of the codex is a representative of the Byzantine text-type. Aland placed it in Category V.

According to the Claremont Profile Method it belongs to the cluster Π278 in Luke 1, Luke 10, and Luke 20. To this cluster belong manuscripts 1209 and 1509.

== History ==
The manuscript was written by Methodius, a monk and presbyter. The manuscript was added to the list of New Testament manuscripts by Scholz (1794-1852). It was examined and described by Paulin Martin.

The manuscript is currently housed at the Bibliothèque nationale de France (Gr. 82, fol. 1-41.51-305) in Paris.

== See also ==
- List of New Testament minuscules
- Biblical manuscript
- Textual criticism
- Minuscule 278b
