= Minuscule 278b =

Minuscule 2898
- New Testament manuscript
- Text: Gospel of Matthew 13:43-17:5
- Date: 10th century
- Script: Greek
- Now at: Bibliothèque nationale de France
- Size: 20.2 cm by 15 cm
- Type: Byzantine text-type
- Category: V
- Note: marginalia

Minuscule 278b (in the Gregory-Aland numbering), ε 162 (Soden), is a Greek minuscule manuscript of the New Testament, on parchment. Paleographically it has been assigned to the 10th century. The manuscript has been re-numbered Minuscule 2898. It has marginalia.

== Description ==
The codex contains only the text of the Gospel of Matthew 13:43-17:5 on 9 parchment leaves (20.2 cm by 15 cm). The text is written in one column per page, in 20 lines per page.

The text is divided according to the κεφαλαια (chapters), whose numbers are given at the margin, and their τιτλοι (titles of chapters) at the top of the pages. There is also another text's division according to the smaller Ammonian Sections, with references to the Eusebian Canons (written below Ammonian Section numbers).

== Text ==
The Greek text of the codex is a representative of the Byzantine text-type. Kurt Aland placed it in Category V.

== History ==
The major part of the codex lost, only 9 leaves have survived. They were added to another codex, written in 1072. The two unrelated manuscripts are now designated by the numbers 278, and 2898, having been formerly assigned the numbers 278a and 278b.

The manuscript was once belonged to Mazarin. It was added to the list of New Testament manuscripts by Scholz (1794-1852). It was examined and described by Paulin Martin. C. R. Gregory saw the manuscript in 1885.

The manuscript is currently housed at the Bibliothèque nationale de France (Gr. 82, fol. 42-50) at Paris.

== See also ==
- List of New Testament minuscules
- Biblical manuscript
- Textual criticism
- 278
