= Minuscule 2812 =

- New Testament manuscript
- Text: Gospels
- Date: 10th century
- Script: Greek
- Now at: Biblioteca Nacional de España
- Category: none

Minuscule 2812 (in the Gregory-Aland numbering), is a Greek minuscule manuscript of the New Testament, on 151 parchment leaves (11.9 cm by 9.5 cm). It is dated paleographically to the 10th century.

== Description ==
The codex contains the complete text of the four Gospels. The text is written in one column per page, in 19 lines per page. It contains a commentary.

The Greek text of the codex is not assigned to any Category. It was not examined by the Claremont Profile Method.

Currently the codex is housed at the Biblioteca Nacional de España (Res. 235) at Madrid.

== See also ==
- List of New Testament minuscules (2001–)
- Biblical manuscripts
- Textual criticism
