= Rosario Pintaudi =

Italian papyrologist and archaeologist (born 1947)

Rosario Pintaudi (born 10 November 1947) is an Italian papyrologist and archaeologist, who taught at the University of Messina and directed archaeological excavations at Medinet Madi (1995–2007) and Antinoöpolis (2000–2020).

== Biography ==
Born in Sant'Angelo di Brolo near Messina, his family moved to Florence when he was a child. Pintaudi graduated from the Scuole Pie of the Piarists in 1967 and enrolled in the University of Florence in the same year, studying Greek Paleography under Giovan Battista Alberti and Papyrology under Manfredo Manfredi. In 1970 he travelled to Cairo and worked on the papyri of the Egyptian Museum. He graduated in 1971 with a thesis in Greek Paleography (tutored by Alberti): "L’Etymologicum Parvum: introduzione ed edizione critica"; in the same year he published his first scholarly works and enrolled in the specialized program in Greek Paleography and Papyrology of his alma mater, graduating in 1972 with a thesis in Papyrology: "Testi recuperati dai Papiri Fiorentini (P.Flor. II). Edizione e commento". In 1974 he travelled to Antinoöpolis where the University of Florence had an active archeological mission.

Since 1969 he frequented the Laurentian Library on a daily basis. In 1971, Manfredi and the Library assigned Pintaudi to the restoration, study and publication of the papyri kept at the Laurentian Library. In 1976 he was officially hired by the Library as an external expert. At the same time, he obtained a research grant from the University of Florence, then becoming Researcher; in 1980 he also started working on the Wessely papyri of the Czech National Library in Prague. In 1984 he became Professor of Papyrology at the University of Messina, where he served until his retirement from teaching in 2018.

Pintaudi started three scholarly series, also serving as general editor of each:

- 1975: "Papyrologica Florentina" (Pap. Flor.), started by Pintaudi with Alfiero Manetti (owner of the publishing house Libreria Antiquaria Gonnelli); initially intended to celebrate Gonnelli's hundredth anniversary, it is devoted to the publication of monographs in the fields of papyrology and classical philology.
- 1989: "Analecta Papyrologica" (APapyrol), a scholarly journal devoted to papyrology, published in Messina.
- 2002: "Carteggi di filologi", which edits letters of classical scholars, including that of Domenico Comparetti.

In the period 2001-2025 he was director of "Aegyptus", the scholarly journal of egyptology and papyrology published by the Catholic University of Milan. In 2012, a Festschrift was edited to celebrate his 65th birthday.

=== Prizes ===
- 2004: Praemium Classicum Clavarense.
- 2007: Anassilaos Prize for classical scholarship.
- 2017: Golden medalist of the Associazione Italiana di Cultura Classica.

== Research activity ==
Although some of his early publications technically pertain to the field of Byzantine and Renaissance lexicography, Pintaudi is primarily a papyrologist and an archaeologist. He has restored, edited and published Greek papyri from Italian and European collections, including Florence, London, Vatican City and Prague. He has edited four volumes of papyri of the Laurentian Library and one of the Papiri della Società Italiana, the archive of Aphrodito (from papyri kept at the Vatican Library), three volumes of papyri of the Karl Wessely collection of Prague, two of the Greek papyri of the Martin Schøyen collection (London – Oslo), a volume of ostraka from the Cairo Egyptian Museum (co-edited with Claudio Gallazzi and Klaas Worp) and two of ostraka from Medinet Madi – the second one as a two-parts article published in the scientific journal Chronique d'Égypte –, and a volume of waxed and wooden tablets; additionally, two papyrological miscellanies, three papyrological Festschriften and several pieces published in scholarly journals such as the Zeitschrift für Papyrologie und Epigraphik. Furthermore, he co-edited the catalogue of the Ashburnham manuscripts in the Laurentian library.

In 2010, he promoted and edited the Italian translation of Ulrich Wilcken's Introduction to Papyrology. He also researched the history of his discipline and in Miscellanea Papyrologica (1980, pp. 391–409) he published an important essay on the history of Papyrology in Italy, which started a series of further researches by Pintaudi and others. Other than the 24 volumes (as of 2022) of the "Carteggi di Filologi" series – two of which co-edited by Pintaudi himself –, several minor letter collections were mainly published through «APapyrol», by Pintaudi and others.

In 2000, he and Edda Bresciani re-opened the archaeological mission in Antinoöpolis, at the same time continuing the excavations at Medinet Madi (Narmouthis) until 2007. In 2000 he founded the Accademia Fiorentina di Papirologia e Studi sul Mondo Anrico, a private organization which helps the University of Florence and the Laurentian Library in promoting papyrology in Florence.

As of 2022, he has published more than 600 scholarly works in the field of papyrology. In his earlier years, he occasionally wrote on the classical tradition and the reception of classical literature in Italian Renaissance and on the history of Italian libraries.

== Selected works ==
=== Monographs ===
==== Laurentian Papyri and PSI ====
- Pintaudi, Rosario, ed. (1976). Dai papiri della Biblioteca Medicea Laurenziana di Firenze (P. Laur. I). Pap. Flor., 1. Firenze: Edizioni Gonnelli.
- Pintaudi, Rosario, ed. (1977). Dai papiri della Biblioteca Medicea Laurenziana di Firenze (P. Laur. II). Pap. Flor., 2. Firenze: Edizioni Gonnelli.
- Pintaudi, Rosario, ed. (1979). Dai papiri della Biblioteca Medicea Laurenziana di Firenze (P. Laur. III). Pap. Flor., 5. Firenze: Edizioni Gonnelli.
- Pintaudi, Rosario, ed. (1983). Dai papiri della Biblioteca Medicea Laurenziana di Firenze (P. Laur. IV). Pap. Flor., 12. Firenze: Edizioni Gonnelli.
- Bartoletti, Vittorio; Bastianini, Guido; Messeri, Gabriella; Montanari, Franco; Pintaudi, Rosario, eds. (2008). Papiri greci e latini (PSI, n.ri 1453–1574). Papiri della Società Italiana, 15. Firenze: Istituto Papirologico "G. Vitelli".

==== Schøyen Papyri (London – Oslo) ====
- Pintaudi, Rosario, ed. (2005). Papyri Graecae Schøyen (P. Schøyen I. N.ri 1–25). Pap. Flor., 35. Firenze: Edizioni Gonnelli. ISBN 8874680260.
- Minutoli, Diletta; Pintaudi, Rosario, eds. (2010). Papyri Graecae Schøyen (P. Schøyen II. N.ri 25–34). Pap. Flor., 40. Firenze: Edizioni Gonnelli. ISBN 9788874680320.

==== Wessely Papyri (Prague) ====
- Dostálová, Růžena; Pintaudi, Rosario; Vidman, Ladislav, eds. (1988). Papyri Graecae Wessely Pragenses (P. Prag. I. N.ri 1–117). Pap. Flor., 16. Firenze: Edizioni Gonnelli.
- Dostálová, Růžena; Pintaudi, Rosario; Vidman, Ladislav, eds. (1995). Papyri Graecae Wessely Pragenses (P. Prag. II. N.ri 118–205). Pap. Flor., 26. Firenze: Edizioni Gonnelli. ISBN 8874680171.
- Pintaudi, Rosario; Rathbone, Dominic, eds. (2011). Papyri Wessely Pragenses (P. Prag. III. N.ri 206–249). Pap. Flor., 41. Firenze: Edizioni Gonnelli. ISBN 9788874680344.

==== Ostraka from Cairo and Medinet Madi ====
- Gallazzi, Claudio; Pintaudi, Rosario; Worp, Klaas A., eds. (1986). Ostraka greci del Museo Egizio del Cairo (O. Cair. GPW). Pap. Flor., 14. Firenze: Edizioni Gonnelli.
- Pintaudi, Rosario; Sijpesteijn, Pieter J., eds. (1993). Ostraka greci da Narmuthis (OGN I). Quaderni di Medinet Madi, 2. Pisa: Giardini Editori e Stampatori.
- Menchetti & Pintaudi 2007, Menchetti & Pintaudi 2009.

==== Other papyrological monographs (tablets, Festschriften, miscellanies, Wilcken) ====
- Pintaudi, Rosario, ed. (1980). I Papiri Vaticani Greci dell'Archivio di Aphrodito (P. Vatic. Aphrodito). Documenti e riproduzioni, 3. Città del Vaticano: Biblioteca Apostolica Vaticana.
- Pintaudi, Rosario, ed. (1980). Miscellanea Papyrologica. Pap. Flor., 8. Firenze: Edizioni Gonnelli.
- Pintaudi, Rosario; Sijpesteijn, Pieter J., eds. (1989). Tavolette lignee e cerate di varie collezioni (T. Varie). Pap. Flor., 18. Firenze: Edizioni Gonnelli.
- Capasso, Mario; Messeri Savorelli, Gabriella; Pintaudi, Rosario, eds. (1990). Miscellanea Papyrologica in onore del bicentenario dell'edizione della Charta Borgiana. Pap. Flor., 19. Vol. I–II. Firenze: Edizioni Gonnelli.
- Harrauer, Hermann; Pintaudi, Rosario, eds. (2004). Gedenkschrift Ulrike Horak (P. Horak). Pap. Flor., 34. Firenze: Edizioni Gonnelli. ISBN 8874680252.
- Wilcken, Ulrich (2010). Pintaudi, Rosario (ed.). Fondamenti della papirologia. Bari: Edizioni Dedalo. ISBN 9788822058157.
- Casanova, Angelo; Messeri Savorelli, Gabriella; Pintaudi, Rosario, eds. (2016). e sì d'amici pieno. Omaggio di studiosi italiani a Guido Bastianini per il suo settantesimo compleanno. Pap. Flor., 45. Vol. I–II. Firenze: Edizioni Gonnelli.
- Bastianini, Guido; Maltomini, Francesca; Manetti, Daniela; Minutoli, Diletta; Pintaudi, Rosario, eds. (2020). e me l'ovrare appaga. Papiri e saggi in onore di Gabriella Messeri (P. Messeri). Edizioni dell'«Istituto Papirologico Vitelli», 10. Firenze: Firenze University Press.

==== Archaeological reports ====
- Pintaudi, Rosario, ed. (2008). Antinoupolis I. Scavi e materiali, 1. Firenze: Firenze University Press.
- Bresciani, Edda; Delattre, Alain; Heilporn, Paul; Martin, Alain; Menchetti, Angiolo; Nachtergael, Georges; Pintaudi, Rosario; Silvano, Flora, eds. (2010). Narmouthis 2006. Documents et objets découverts à Médinet Madi en 2006. Monografie di «Egitto e Vicino Oriente», 2. Pisa: Pisa University Press.
- Pintaudi, Rosario, ed. (2011). Antinoupolis II. Scavi e materiali, 2. Firenze: Istituto Papirologico «G. Vitelli».
- Pintaudi, Rosario, ed. (2017). Antinoupolis III. Edizioni dell'Istituto Papirologico «G. Vitelli», 7. Firenze: Firenze University Press.
- Narmouthis 2001. I (2021), Narmouthis 2001. II (2022).

==== History of papyrology and philology and «Carteggi di Filologi» ====
- Morelli, Donato; Pintaudi, Rosario, eds. (1983). Cinquant'anni di papirologia in Italia. Carteggi Breccia – Comparetti – Norsa – Vitelli. Vol. I–II. Naples: Bibliopolis. ISBN 9788870881172.
- Bandini, Angelo Maria (1990). Fantoni, Anna Rita; Pintaudi, Rosario; Tesi, Mario (eds.). Dei principi e dei progressi della Real Biblioteca Mediceo Laurenziana (Ms. Laur. Acquisti e Doni 142). Documenti inediti di cultura toscana, n.s. 3. Firenze: Edizioni Gonnelli.
- Pintaudi, Rosario, ed. (1991). D'Ancona – Vitelli. Con un'Appendice sulle false Carte d'Arborea. Carteggio D'Ancona, 11. Pisa: Scuola Normale Superiore.
- Macconi, Maria Grazia; Pintaudi, Rosario; Squilloni, Antonella, eds. (2002). Catalogo generale del fondo Domenico Comparetti: Carteggio e Manoscritti — Domenico Comparetti e Girolamo Vitelli: Storia di un'amicizia e un dissidio. Carteggi di Filologi, 1. Messina: Università degli Studi – Dipartimento di Filologia e Linguistica. ISBN 8889250003.
- Pintaudi, Rosario, ed. (2002). Un erudito del Settecento: Angelo Maria Bandini. Itinerari eruditi, n.s. 4. Messina: Sicania.
- Bresciani, Edda; Donadoni, Sergio; Fattah, Ahmed Abdel; Minutoli, Diletta; Pintaudi, Rosario; Silvano, Flora, eds. (2003). Annibale Evaristo Breccia in Egitto — Mostra documentaria. Biblioteca Archeologica, 1. Il Cairo: Istituto Italiano di Cultura del Cairo.
- Baldi, Davide; Fantoni, Anna Rita; Pintaudi, Rosario; Tesi, Mario, eds. (2004). Alessandro Pini viaggiatore in Egitto (1681-1683) — Alessandro Pini, De moribus Turcarum. Biblioteca Archeologica, 2. Il Cairo: Istituto Italiano di Cultura del Cairo.
- Di Giglio, Anna; Pintaudi, Rosario, eds. (2022). Gaetano Salvemini nella corrispondenza con Girolamo Vitelli, Medea Norsa, Angelo Segrè, Ermenegildo Pistelli. Carteggi di Filologi, 24. Firenze: Edizioni Gonnelli. ISBN 9788874680573.

==== Catalogue of the Ashburnham manuscripts of the Laurentian Library ====
- Lodi, Teresa; Pintaudi, Rosario, eds. (1983). I codici Ashburnhamiani della Biblioteca Medicea Laurenziana di Firenze. Indici e Cataloghi, 8. Vol. I/7. Rome: Istituto Poligrafico e Zecca dello Stato.
- Lodi, Teresa; Pintaudi, Rosario, eds. (1991). I codici Ashburnhamiani della Biblioteca Medicea Laurenziana di Firenze: Indici. Indici e Cataloghi, 8. Rome: Istituto Poligrafico e Zecca dello Stato.

=== Selected papers ===
- Pintaudi, Rosario, ed. (1973). Etymologicum parvum quod vocatur. Testi e documenti per lo studio dell'antichità, 42. Milano: Cisalpino-Goliardica.
- Pintaudi, Rosario (1973). "Etymologica". Rendiconti dell'Istituto Lombardo. 107: 10–24.
- Pintaudi, Rosario (1975a). "Gli Epimerismi come fonti dell'Etymologicum parvum". Annali della Scuola Normale Superiore di Pisa. Serie III, 5 (1): 167–175. JSTOR 24300657.
- Pintaudi, Rosario (1975b). "L'apografo parigino dell'Etymologicum parvum". Studi Italiani di Filologia Classica. Nuova Serie, 47: 222–235.
- Pintaudi, Rosario (1976a). "Il Platone di Francesco Verino secondo (Laur. acquisti e doni 706)". Rinascimento. Serie II, 16: 241–244.
- Pintaudi, Rosario (1976b). "Lexicon quod Theaeteti vocatur". Jahrbuch der österreichischen Byzantinistik. 25: 105–120.
- Pintaudi, Rosario; Tesi, Mario (1976). "Un nuovo codice laurenziano della traduzione di Tucidide di Lorenzo Valla (Laur. Acquisti e doni 712, già ms. Phillipps 115)". Rinascimento. Serie II, 16: 213–218.
- Ficino, Marsilio (1977). Pintaudi, Rosario (ed.). Lessico greco-latino. Laur. Ashb. 1439. Rome: Edizioni dell’Ateneo e Bizzarri.
- Pintaudi, Rosario (1978). "La polemica Courier - Del Furia a proposito del Laurenziano Gr. Conv. Soppr. 627. Documenti di archivio". Atti e Memorie dell'Accademia Toscana di Scienze e Lettere «La Colombaria». 48: 203–238.
- Pintaudi, Rosario (1979a). "In margine all'edizione critica dell'Etymologicum Genuinum". Annali della Scuola Normale Superiore di Pisa. Serie III, 9 (1): 185–194.
- Pintaudi, Rosario (1979b). "Note codicologiche". Rinascimento. Serie II, 16: 291–310.
- Pintaudi, Rosario; Römer, Cornelia (1981). "Le lettere di Wilamowitz a Vitelli". Annali della Scuola Normale Superiore di Pisa. Serie III, 11 (2): 363–398.
- Canart, Paul; Pintaudi, Rosario (1984). "PSI XVII Congr. 5: Un système d'oracles chrétiens ("Sortes Sanctorum")". Zeitschrift für Papyrologie und Epigraphik. 57: 85–90. JSTOR 20184119.
- Canart, Paul; Pintaudi, Rosario (1986). "Le palimpseste hagiographique grec du Laurentianus 74,17 et la Passion de S. Pansophius d'Alexandrie". Analecta Bollandiana. 104 (1–2): 5–16. doi:10.1484/J.ABOL.4.01497.
- Macconi, Maria Grazia; Pintaudi, Rosario (1990). "Domenico Comparetti – Giuseppe Pitrè. Epistolario. Dalle Carte Comparetti della Facoltà di Lettere e Filosofia dell'Università di Firenze". Atti e Memorie dell'Accademia Toscana di Scienze e Lettere «La Colombaria». 55: 271–307.
- Pintaudi, Rosario (1993). "Documenti per una storia della papirologia in Italia". Analecta Papyrologia. 5: 155–181.
- Pintaudi, Rosario; Minutoli, Diletta (2000). "Medea Norsa ed Angiolo Orvieto". Analecta Papyrologia. 12: 305–370.
- Pintaudi, Rosario (2002–2003). "Dalle lettere e dai libri: recuperi dalle carte di Vittorio Bartoletti". Analecta Papyrologia. 14–15: 257–261.
- Pintaudi, Rosario (2003). "Le Elleniche di Ossirinco. Appunti delle lezioni di storia greca tenute dal prof. G. De Sanctis". Quaderni di Storia. 57: 5–100.
- Canart, Paul; Pintaudi, Rosario (2004–2005). "Il martirio di San Pansofio. Edizione critica". Analecta Papyrologia. 16–17: 189–245.
- Menchetti, Angiolo; Pintaudi, Rosario (2007). "Ostraka greci e bilingui da Narmuthis". Chronique d'Égypte. 82 (163–164): 227–280. doi:10.1484/J.CDE.2.309325.
- Menchetti, Angiolo; Pintaudi, Rosario (2009). "Ostraka greci e bilingui da Narmuthis (II)". Chronique d'Égypte. 84 (167–168): 201–238. doi:10.1484/J.CDE.3.10.
- Pintaudi, Rosario; Minutoli, Diletta (2015). "Epimetron favoriniano. Note sul Περὶ φυγῆς di Favorino nei carteggi G. Mercati – M. Norsa – G. Vitelli". Analecta Papyrologia. 27: 85–127.
- Martin, Alain; Pintaudi, Rosario (2021). "Narmouthis 2001. Documents découverts à Médinet Madi en 2001 (I)". Chronique d'Égypte. 96 (191): 102–113. doi:10.1484/J.CDE.5.128168.
- Martin, Alain; Pintaudi, Rosario (2022). "Narmouthis 2001. Documents découverts à Médinet Madi en 2001 (II)". Chronique d'Égypte. 97 (193–194): 102–113. doi:10.1484/J.CDE.5.134179.

== Bibliography ==
- Harrauer, Hermann (1998–1999). "14 Wilcken-Briefe an Vitelli und 2 Karten an Comparetti". Analecta Papyrologia. 10–11: 213–236.
- Harrauer, Hermann (2000). "Was für köstliche Papyri besitzen sie doch in Florenz! Wilcken-Briefe an Medea Norsa". Analecta Papyrologia. 12: 371–389.
- Harrauer, Hermann (January 2022). "'Laudatio' di Rosario Pintaudi". academia.edu. Pisa – Roma: Fabrizio Serra Editore.
- Menci, Giovanna (2015). "Manfredo Manfredi (1925–2011)". In Capasso, Mario (ed.). Hermae. Scholars and Scholarship in Papyrology. Vol. IV. Pisa – Roma: Fabrizio Serra. pp. 77–81. ISBN 9788862277525.
- Messeri, Gabriella; Malafronte, Rosanna (2022). Biografia e bibliografia di Rosario Pintaudi. Pisa – Roma: Fabrizio Serra.
- Minutoli, Diletta (2002–2003). "Il Carteggio Orvieto-Vitelli". Analecta Papyrologia. 14–15: 323–336.
- Minutoli, Diletta, ed. (2012). Inediti offerti a Rosario Pintaudi per il 65° compleanno (P. Pintaudi). Florence. ISBN 9788874680382.
