= Minuscule 2813 =

- New Testament manuscript
- Text: Luke; John
- Date: 13th century
- Script: Greek
- Now at: Private
- Size: 11.9 cm by 9.5 cm
- Category: none

Minuscule 2813 (in the Gregory-Aland numbering), is a Greek minuscule manuscript of the New Testament, on 151 parchment leaves (11.9 cm by 9.5 cm). Dated paleographically to the 13th century.

== Description ==
The codex contains Luke and John with some lacunae. The text is written in one column per page, in 19 lines per page. It contains a miniature before Gospel of John. It is rubbed. The manuscript was bound with John preceding Luke. The leaves are numbered and according to these numbers Luke preceded John before bounding.

Kurt Aland the Greek text of the codex did not place in any Category. It was not examined by the Claremont Profile Method.

Currently the codex is in private hands.

== See also ==
- List of New Testament minuscules (2001–)
- Textual criticism
