= Little Shield =

Little Shield (Cheyenne language: A-che-kan-koo-eni) was a chieftain of the Northern Cheyenne from 1865 to 1879. He is known for creating a collection of ledger drawings accounting the Indian wars along the North Platte river. Little Shield also fought in the Battle of Little Bighorn, leading the Dog Soldiers.

Following the Battle of the Little Bighorn, the US Army increased attempts to capture the Cheyenne. In 1877, after the Dull Knife Fight, when Crazy Horse surrendered at Fort Robinson, a few Cheyenne chiefs and their people surrendered as well. The Cheyenne chiefs who surrendered at the fort were Dull Knife, Little Wolf, Standing Elk, and Wild Hog, with nearly 1,000 Cheyenne. Later that year Two Moon surrendered at Fort Keogh with 300 Cheyenne. The Cheyenne wanted and expected to live on the reservation with the Sioux in accordance to an April 29, 1868 treaty of Fort Laramie, which Dull Knife, Little Wolf and also Little Shield had signed.

In the fall of 1878 somewhere beyond the North Platte River after crossing into Nebraska the Cheyenne held council and it was discovered that 34 of the original 297 were missing, most had been killed but a few had decided to take other paths to the north. This is where the Cheyenne split into two groups. Those that wished to stop running, including Little Shield, Wild Hog and Left Hand, planned to go with Dull Knife to the Red Cloud Agency. The Cheyenne that decided to keep heading to the Power River country followed Little Wolf. Little Shield lead the remaining Dog Soldiers who had stayed with Dull Knife.

On October 23, 1878, Dull Knife's band of Cheyenne, in a blinding snowstorm, discovered that they were surrounded by the army; the encounter was accidental, neither party having seen the other due to the snow. Dull Knife convinced his band not to attack the soldiers. The army offered some food and a few blankets to the Cheyenne and suggested a move to a better camp nearby at Fort Robinson in northwestern Nebraska. There the army confiscated the Cheyenne ponies but distributed more rations, including sugar and coffee. The next morning after a two-hour council, the Cheyenne agreed to turn over their weapons. However they turned over only the older ones, concealing many. After hearing that Red Cloud and Spotted Tail had been relocated to Pine Ridge, Dull Knife decided, due to the weather and his people's condition, to go to Fort Robinson. The Cheyenne decided that night to take apart their best guns, women hid the barrels under their clothing and the smaller pieces were attached to cloths and moccasins as ornaments. Without telling the Cheyenne, it was determined by November 22 by Carl Schurz, the Secretary of the Interior that the Cheyenne would be returned to the south. That was also the course recommended by General Phillip Sheridan, commander of the Division of Missouri.

When the Cheyenne refused to return to the reservation in the south, bars were put on windows and no rations were given, including wood for heat. On January 9, 1879, Dull Knife still refused to go back south, however Wild Hog and Left Hand had agreed to talk but said their people would not go. Upon hearing this Wild Hog was held as a prisoner and shackled. That night the Cheyenne tried to make a daring escape using the dismantled guns they had hidden upon arriving at the fort. The Cheyenne were immediately followed and many were killed, Little Shield among them.
