= List of New Testament minuscules (1001–2000) =

A New Testament minuscule is a copy of a portion of the New Testament written in a small, cursive Greek script (developed from Uncial).

Below is the list of New Testament minuscules 1001 to 2000. For other related lists, see:

- Lists of New Testament minuscules
- List of New Testament minuscules (1–1000)
- List of New Testament minuscules (2001–3000)

== Legend ==
- The numbers (#) are the now standard system of Caspar René Gregory, often referred to as the Gregory-Aland numbers.
- Included among the cataloged minuscules are the following types of manuscripts, color coded:

Grey represents continuous text manuscripts containing only New Testament portions
Beige represents manuscripts with New Testament portions and a catena (quotations from church fathers)
Light cyan represents manuscripts of single-author commentaries who included the full Scripture text.
Light red represents manuscripts of single-author commentaries who included both the full Scripture text and a catena.
Light purple represents manuscripts of commentaries where the Scripture text was abridged.
White represents manuscript numbers no longer in use.

- Dates are estimated to the nearest 100 year increment where specific date is unknown.
- Content generally only describes sections of the New Testament: Gospels, The Acts of the Apostles (Acts), Pauline epistles, and so on. Sometimes the surviving portion of a codex is so limited that specific books, chapters or even verses can be indicated. Linked articles, where they exist, generally specify content in detail, by verse.
- Digital images are referenced with direct links to the hosting web pages, with the exception of those at the INTF. The quality and accessibility of the images is as follows:

Gold color indicates high resolution color images available online.
Tan color indicates high resolution color images available locally, not online.
Light tan color indicates only a small fraction of manuscript pages with color images available online.
Light gray color indicates black/white or microfilm images available online.
Light blue color indicates manuscript not imaged, and is currently lost or ownership unknown.
Light pink color indicates manuscript destroyed, presumed destroyed, or deemed too fragile to digitize.
Violet color indicates high resolution ultraviolet images available online.

† Indicates the manuscript has damaged or missing pages.
^{P} Indicates only a portion of the books were included.
^{S} Indicates lost portions of manuscript replaced via supplement of a later hand.
^{abs} (abschrift) Indicates manuscript is copy. All of these have now received new numbers from the INTF.
[ ] Brackets around Gregory-Aland number indicate the manuscript belongs to an already numbered manuscript, was formerly numbered as a copy of another manuscript, was found to not be a continuous text manuscript, was found to be written in modern Greek versus Koine Greek, or has been destroyed.

== Minuscules 1001-1100 ==
#	Date	Contents	Pages	Institution and refs.	City, State	Country	Images
1001	13th	Gospels	272	Iviron Monastery, 33	Mount Athos	Greece	INTF
1002	14th	Gospels	219	Iviron Monastery, 51	Mount Athos	Greece	
1003	15th	Gospels, Acts, General Epistles, Pauline Epistles	305	Iviron Monastery, 52	Mount Athos	Greece	INTF
1004	13th	Gospels	191	Iviron Monastery, 334	Mount Athos	Greece	INTF, CSNTM
1005	14th	Gospels	227	Iviron Monastery, 55	Mount Athos	Greece	INTF, CSNTM
1005	14th	Gospels	227	Iviron Monastery, 55	Mount Athos	Greece	Elpenor
1006	11th	Gospels, Revelation	226	Iviron Monastery, 56	Mount Athos	Greece	INTF, CSNTM
1006	11th	Gospels, Revelation	226	Iviron Monastery, 56	Mount Athos	Greece	Elpenor
1007	12th	Gospels	254	Iviron Monastery, 59	Mount Athos	Greece	INTF, CSNTM
1008	13th	Gospels	145	Iviron Monastery, 61	Mount Athos	Greece	INTF, CSNTM
1009	13th	Gospels	230	Iviron Monastery, 63	Mount Athos	Greece	INTF, CSNTM
1010	12th	Gospels	187	Iviron Monastery, 66	Mount Athos	Greece	INTF, CSNTM
1011	1263	Gospels	151	Iviron Monastery, 67	Mount Athos	Greece	INTF, CSNTM
1012	11th	Gospels	239	Iviron Monastery, 68	Mount Athos	Greece	INTF, CSNTM
1013	11th/12th	Gospels	297	Iviron Monastery, 69	Mount Athos	Greece	INTF, CSNTM
1014	11th	Gospels	289	Iviron Monastery, 72	Mount Athos	Greece	INTF, CSNTM
1015	13th	Gospels	644	Iviron Monastery, 75	Mount Athos	Greece	INTF
1016 + [1150]	13th	Luke 1:1-10:42 (Nicetas Catena)	410	National Library, Taphu 466	Athens	Greece	INTF
1016 + [1150]	13th	Luke 11:1-24:53 (Nicetas Catena)	409	Iviron Monastery, 371	Mount Athos	Greece	INTF
1017	1433	Gospels	292	Iviron Monastery, 548	Mount Athos	Greece	INTF
1018	15th	Gospels	224	Iviron Monastery, 549	Mount Athos	Greece	INTF
1019	16th	Gospels	176	Iviron Monastery, 550	Mount Athos	Greece	INTF
1020	14th	Gospels	278	Iviron Monastery, 562	Mount Athos	Greece	INTF
1021	13th	Theophylact Commentary on the Gospels	372	Iviron Monastery, 599	Mount Athos	Greece	INTF, CSNTM
1022	14th	Acts, Pauline epistles, General Epistles	360	Walters Art Museum, Ms. W. 533	Baltimore, MD	USA	WAM
1023	1338	Gospels	271	Iviron Monastery, 608	Mount Athos	Greece	INTF, CSNTM
1024	15th	Gospels	232	Iviron Monastery, 610	Mount Athos	Greece	INTF
1025	14th	Gospels	277	Iviron Monastery, 636	Mount Athos	Greece	INTF
1026	15th	Gospels	170	Iviron Monastery, 641	Mount Athos	Greece	INTF
1027	1492	John of Constantinople Commentary on Matthew†, Mark†, Luke†	449	Iviron Monastery, 647	Mount Athos	Greece	INTF, CSNTM
1028	11th	Matthew†	79	Iviron Monastery, 217	Mount Athos	Greece	INTF, CSNTM
1029	14th	Theophylact Commentary on the Gospels	318	Iviron Monastery, 671	Mount Athos	Greece	INTF
1030	1518	Gospels	160	Iviron Monastery, 342	Mount Athos	Greece	INTF, CSNTM
1031	13th	Luke^{P}†, John^{P}†	53	Iviron Monastery, 719	Mount Athos	Greece	INTF
1032	14th	Gospels †	267	Karakallou Monastery, 19	Mount Athos	Greece	INTF
1032	14th	Gospels †	267	Karakallou Monastery, 19	Mount Athos	Greece	Elpenor
1033	14th	Gospels	212	Karakallou Monastery, 20	Mount Athos	Greece	MAR
1034	13th	Gospels	323	Karakallou Monastery, 31	Mount Athos	Greece	MAR
1034	13th	Gospels	323	Karakallou Monastery, 31	Mount Athos	Greece	Elpenor
1035	13th	Gospels	317	Karakallou Monastery, 34	Mount Athos	Greece	INTF
1036	14th	Gospels	165	Karakallou Monastery, 35	Mount Athos	Greece	INTF
1037	14th	Gospels	306	Karakallou Monastery, 36	Mount Athos	Greece	MAR
1038	14th	Gospels	209	Karakallou Monastery, 37	Mount Athos	Greece	MAR
1039	14th	Gospels	282	Karakallou Monastery, 111	Mount Athos	Greece	INTF
1040	14th	Gospels†, Acts†, General Epistles†, Pauline Epistles†	340	Karakallou Monastery, 121	Mount Athos	Greece	INTF
1041	1293	Matthew and Mark†	142	Karakallou Monastery, 128	Mount Athos	Greece	MAR
1042	14th	Gospels†	322	Karakallou Monastery, 198	Mount Athos	Greece	INTF
1043	14th	Theophylact Commentary on Matthew, John†	81	Konstamonitou Monastery, 1	Mount Athos	Greece	INTF
1044	17th	Gospels	178	Konstamonitou Monastery, 61	Mount Athos	Greece	INTF
1045	11th	Matthew, Mark, Luke	162	Konstamonitou Monastery, 105	Mount Athos	Greece	INTF
1046	12th	Gospels	141	Koutloumousiou Monastery, 67	Mount Athos	Greece	INTF
1047	13th	Gospels †	185	Koutloumousiou Monastery, 68	Mount Athos	Greece	INTF
1048	13th	Gospels	267	Koutloumousiou Monastery, 69	Mount Athos	Greece	INTF
1049	11th	Gospels	203	National Museum of Fine Arts, NMB 1961	Stockholm	Sweden	
1050	1268	Gospels	232	Koutloumousiou Monastery, 71	Mount Athos	Greece	INTF
1051	12th	Gospels	291	Owner unknown, formerly: Koutloumousiou Monastery, 72	Mount Athos	Greece	
1052	13th	Gospels †	267	Koutloumousiou Monastery, 73	Mount Athos	Greece	INTF
1053	13th	Gospels †	218	Koutloumousiou Monastery, 74	Mount Athos	Greece	INTF
1054	11th	Gospels †	351	Koutloumousiou Monastery, 75	Mount Athos	Greece	INTF
1055	10th	Gospels †	190	Koutloumousiou Monastery, 76	Mount Athos	Greece	INTF
1056	11th	Gospels	353	Koutloumousiou Monastery, 77	Mount Athos	Greece	INTF
1056	11th	Gospels	2	Victoria and Albert Museum	London	UK	INTF
1056	11th	Gospels	1	Princeton University Art Museum, 36-11	Princeton, NJ	USA	INTF
1057	13th	Gospels	201	Koutloumousiou Monastery, 78	Mount Athos	Greece	INTF
1058	1145	Gospels, Acts, General Epistles, Pauline Epistles	290	Koutloumousiou Monastery, 90a	Mount Athos	Greece	INTF
1059	15th	Gospels	204	Koutloumousiou Monastery, 278	Mount Athos	Greece	INTF
1060	15th	Gospels	167	Koutloumousiou Monastery, 281	Mount Athos	Greece	INTF
1061	1362	Gospels	258	Koutloumousiou Monastery, 283	Mount Athos	Greece	INTF
1061	1362	Gospels	258	Koutloumousiou Monastery, 283	Mount Athos	Greece	Elpenor
1062	14th	Gospels	269	Koutloumousiou Monastery, 284, fol. 1-269	Mount Athos	Greece	INTF
1063	1674	Gospels	143	Koutloumousiou Monastery, 285	Mount Athos	Greece	INTF
1064	18th	Gospels†, Revelation†	174	Koutloumousiou Monastery, 286	Mount Athos	Greece	INTF
1065	1576	Gospels	199	Koutloumousiou Monastery, 287	Mount Athos	Greece	INTF
1066	10th	Acts†, General Epistles†	145	Koutloumousiou Monastery, 288	Mount Athos	Greece	INTF
1067	14th	Acts^{P}, General Epistles^{P}, Pauline Epistles^{P}	55	Koutloumousiou Monastery, 289	Mount Athos	Greece	INTF
1068	17th	Gospels	200	Koutloumousiou Monastery, 290	Mount Athos	Greece	INTF
1069	13th	Acts, General Epistles, Pauline Epistles	179	Koutloumousiou Monastery, 291	Mount Athos	Greece	INTF
1070	13th	Acts, General Epistles, Pauline Epistles	228	Koutloumousiou Monastery, 293	Mount Athos	Greece	INTF
1071	12th	Gospels	181	Great Lavra Monastery, A' 104	Mount Athos	Greece	INTF, CSNTM
1072	13th	New Testament	411	Great Lavra Monastery, G' 80	Mount Athos	Greece	INTF
1073	10th/11th	Gospels^{S}, Acts	334	Great Lavra Monastery, A' 51	Mount Athos	Greece	INTF, CSNTM
1074	11th	Gospels	201	Great Lavra Monastery, A' 1	Mount Athos	Greece	INTF, CSNTM
1075	14th	New Testament	348	Great Lavra Monastery, L' 195	Mount Athos	Greece	INTF
1076	10th	Gospels	282	Great Lavra Monastery, A' 12	Mount Athos	Greece	INTF, CSNTM
1077	10th	Gospels	264	Great Lavra Monastery, A' 11	Mount Athos	Greece	INTF, CSNTM
1078	10th	Gospels	192	Great Lavra Monastery, A' 16	Mount Athos	Greece	INTF, CSNTM
1079	10th	Gospels	274	Great Lavra Monastery, A' 23	Mount Athos	Greece	INTF, CSNTM
1080	14th	Gospels	411	Great Lavra Monastery, A' 15	Mount Athos	Greece	INTF, CSNTM
1081	12th	Gospels	309	Xeropotamou Monastery, 103	Mount Athos	Greece	MAR
1082	14th	Gospels	284	Xeropotamou Monastery, 105	Mount Athos	Greece	INTF
1083	13th	Gospels	277	Xeropotamou Monastery, 107	Mount Athos	Greece	INTF
1084	14th	Gospels	309	Xeropotamou Monastery, 108	Mount Athos	Greece	INTF
1085	13th	Gospels†	550	Xeropotamou Monastery, 115	Mount Athos	Greece	INTF
1085	13th	Gospels†	550	Xeropotamou Monastery, 115	Mount Athos	Greece	Elpenor
1086	1648	Gospels	304	Xeropotamou Monastery, 123	Mount Athos	Greece	INTF
1087	13th	Gospels	159	Xeropotamou Monastery, 200	Mount Athos	Greece	INTF
1088	16th	Gospels	327	Xeropotamou Monastery, 205	Mount Athos	Greece	INTF
1089	1329	Gospels	201	Xeropotamou Monastery, 221	Mount Athos	Greece	INTF
1090	11th	Gospels	209	Xeropotamou Monastery, 396	Mount Athos	Greece	INTF
1091	12th	Gospels	189	St. Panteleimon Monastery, 25	Mount Athos	Greece	INTF
1092	14th	Gospels	250	St. Panteleimon Monastery, 26	Mount Athos	Greece	INTF
1093	1302	Gospels	190	St. Panteleimon Monastery, 28	Mount Athos	Greece	INTF
1094	13th	New Testament †	272	St. Panteleimon Monastery, 29	Mount Athos	Greece	INTF
1095	14th	Gospels	286	Agiou Pavlou monastery, 4	Mount Athos	Greece	INTF
1096	13th	Gospels	151	Agiou Pavlou monastery, 5	Mount Athos	Greece	INTF
1097	12th	Gospels †	279	Church of Protaton, 41	Mount Athos	Greece	MAR
1098	13th	Luke^{P}, John^{P}	180	Konstamonitou Monastery, 106	Mount Athos	Greece	
1099	14th	Acts, General Epistles, Pauline epistles	229	Dionysiou Monastery, 68	Mount Athos	Greece	INTF
1100	1376	Acts†, General Epistles†, Pauline epistles†	244	Dionysiou Monastery, 75	Mount Athos	Greece	INTF, CSNTM

[top]

== Minuscules 1101–1200 ==
#	Date	Contents	Pages	Institution and refs.	City, State	Country	Images
1101	1660	Acts†, General Epistles†, Pauline epistles†	306	Dionysiou Monastery, 382	Mount Athos	Greece	INTF
1102	14th	Acts, General Epistles, Pauline epistles	197	Docheiariou Monastery, 38	Mount Athos	Greece	INTF
1103	13th	Acts, General Epistles, Pauline Epistles	373	Docheiariou Monastery, 48	Mount Athos	Greece	INTF
1104	1702	Acts, General Epistles, Pauline Epistles	223	Docheiariou Monastery, 136	Mount Athos	Greece	MAR
1105	15th	Acts, General Epistles, Pauline Epistles	338	Docheiariou Monastery, 139	Mount Athos	Greece	MAR
1106	14th	Acts, General Epistles †, Pauline Epistles †	183	Docheiariou Monastery, 147	Mount Athos	Greece	MAR
1107	13th	Acts, General Epistles, Pauline Epistles	194	Esphigmenou Monastery, 63	Mount Athos	Greece	INTF
1108	13th	Acts, General Epistles †, Pauline Epistles †	155	Esphigmenou Monastery, 64	Mount Athos	Greece	
1109	14th	Acts, General Epistles, Pauline Epistles		Owner unknown. Formerly: Esphigmenou Monastery, 65	Mount Athos	Greece	
1110	10th	Gospels	298	Stavronikita Monastery, 43	Mount Athos	Greece	MAR
1111	14th	Gospels	3008	Stavronikita Monastery, 53	Mount Athos	Greece	MAR
1112	12th	Zigabenus Commentary on Mark 12:19 – Luke 10:30	31	Stavronikita Monastery, 54	Mount Athos	Greece	MAR
1113	13th	Gospels	188	Stavronikita Monastery, 56	Mount Athos	Greece	MAR
1114	14th	Gospels	365	Stavronikita Monastery, 70	Mount Athos	Greece	INTF
1115	12th	Acts†, General epistles†, Pauline epistles†	126	Esphigmenou Monastery, 66	Mount Athos	Greece	INTF
1116	15th	Luke^{P}†, John^{P}†,	79	Stavronikita Monastery, 127	Mount Athos	Greece	MAR
1117	14th	Gospels	426	Philotheou Monastery, 5	Mount Athos	Greece	INTF
1118	12th	Gospels	287	Philotheou Monastery, 21	Mount Athos	Greece	INTF
1119	14th	Mark^{P}†, Luke^{P}†, John^{P}†	210	Philotheou Monastery, 22	Mount Athos	Greece	INTF
1120	10th	Gospels	221	Philotheou Monastery, 33	Mount Athos	Greece	INTF
1121	1304	Gospels	345	Philotheou Monastery, 39	Mount Athos	Greece	INTF
1122	13th	Gospels	264	Philotheou Monastery, 41	Mount Athos	Greece	INTF
1123	11th	Gospels	226	Philotheou Monastery, 44	Mount Athos	Greece	INTF
1124	12th	Mark 6:11–16:20; Luke 1:25–16:24	51	Philotheou Monastery, 45	Mount Athos	Greece	INTF
1125	12th	Gospels	192	Philotheou Monastery, 46	Mount Athos	Greece	INTF
1126	13th	Gospels	269	Philotheou Monastery, 47	Mount Athos	Greece	INTF
1127	12th	Gospels, Acts, General Epistles, Pauline Epistles	345	Philotheou Monastery, 48	Mount Athos	Greece	INTF
1128	12th	Matthew† 17:15–28:19, Mark, Luke, John	174	Philotheou Monastery, 51	Mount Athos	Greece	INTF
1129	13th	Matthew† 20:23–28:20, Mark†, Luke†	150	Philotheou Monastery, 53	Mount Athos	Greece	INTF
1130	15th	Theophylact Commentary on the Gospels†	218	Philotheou Monastery, 68	Mount Athos	Greece	INTF
1131	15th	Gospels	295	Philotheou Monastery, 71	Mount Athos	Greece	INTF
1132	15th	Gospels	282	Philotheou Monastery, 72	Mount Athos	Greece	INTF
1133	14th	Gospels †	256	Philotheou Monastery, 74	Mount Athos	Greece	INTF
1134	1671	Gospels	?	Philotheou Monastery, 77	Mount Athos	Greece	
1135	15th	Gospels †	245	Philotheou Monastery, 78	Mount Athos	Greece	INTF
1136	1337	Gospels	260	Philotheou Monastery, 80	Mount Athos	Greece	INTF
1137	13th	Theophylact Commentary on the Gospels†	256	Philotheou Monastery, 86	Mount Athos	Greece	INTF
1138	12th	Gospels	257	Hilandar Monastery, 5	Mount Athos	Greece	INTF
1139	1728	Gospels	235	Hilandar Monastery, 19	Mount Athos	Greece	INTF
1140	1242	Acts, General Epistles, Pauline Epistles	236	Esphigmenou Monastery, 67	Mount Athos	Greece	INTF
1141	11th	Gospels	236	National Archives of Albania, Kod. Br. 4	Tirana	Albania	CSNTM
1142	13th	Gospels	250	Houghton Library, Harvard University, MS Typ 215	Cambridge, MA	USA	HL
1142	13th	Gospels	1	Dumbarton Oaks, acc. no. 58.105, 1 fol. (J. miniat.)	Washington, DC	USA	CSNTM
1143	9th	Gospels	422	National Archives of Albania, No. 2	Tirana	Albania	CSNTM
1144	12th	Gospels	168	Ecumenical Patriarchate, Chalki, Triados, 9 (11)	Istanbul	Turkey	INTF
1144	12th	Gospels	168	Ecumenical Patriarchate, Chalki, Triados, 9 (11)	Istanbul	Turkey	CSNTM
1145	12th	Gospels	300	Ecumenical Patriarchate, Chalki, Triados, 10 (12)	Istanbul	Turkey	INTF
1145	12th	Gospels	300	Ecumenical Patriarchate, Chalki, Triados, 10 (12)	Istanbul	Turkey	CSNTM
1146	14th	Gospels	290	Ecumenical Patriarchate, Chalki, Kamariotissis, 8	Istanbul	Turkey	INTF
1147	1370	Gospels	188	Ecumenical Patriarchate, Chalki, Kamariotissis, 27	Istanbul	Turkey	CSNTM
1147	1370	Gospels	188	Ecumenical Patriarchate, Chalki, Kamariotissis, 27	Istanbul	Turkey	INTF
1148	13th	Gospels	245	Ecumenical Patriarchate, Panaghia 95	Istanbul	Turkey	INTF
1149	13th	Gospels, Acts, General Epistles, Pauline Epistles	461	Ecumenical Patriarchate, Chalki, Kamariotissis, 130 (133)	Istanbul	Turkey	INTF
1149	13th	Gospels, Acts, General Epistles, Pauline Epistles	461	Ecumenical Patriarchate, Chalki, Kamariotissis, 130 (133)	Istanbul	Turkey	CSNTM
[1150] = 1016							
[1151] = 2381		Slavic Tetraevangelium					
1152	1133	Gospels	218	University of Chicago Library, Ms. 129	Chicago	USA	TUOCL
1152	1133	Gospels	218	University of Chicago Library, Ms. 129	Chicago	USA	INTF
[1153] = 2381							
[1154] = 2862							
1155	14th	Gospels†	422	National Library, Taphu 390	Athens	Greece	INTF
1156	1322	Theophylact Commentary on Gospel of Matthew	36	Leimonos Monastery, Ms. Lesbiacus Leimonos 35, fol. 121-156	Kalloni, Lesbos	Greece	LM
1156	1322	Theophylact Commentary on Gospel of Matthew	36	Leimonos Monastery, Ms. Lesbiacus Leimonos 35, fol. 121-156	Kalloni, Lesbos	Greece	INTF
1157	11th	Gospels †	398	Leimonos Monastery, Ms. Lesbiacus Leimonos 67	Kalloni, Lesbos	Greece	LM
1157	11th	Gospels †	398	Leimonos Monastery, Ms. Lesbiacus Leimonos 67	Kalloni, Lesbos	Greece	INTF
1158	15th	Gospels	351	Leimonos Monastery, Ms. Lesbiacus Leimonos 97	Kalloni, Lesbos	Greece	LM
1158	15th	Gospels	351	Leimonos Monastery, Ms. Lesbiacus Leimonos 97	Kalloni, Lesbos	Greece	INTF
1159	14th	Matthew†, Mark† Luke†	178	Leimonos Monastery, Ms. Lesbiacus Leimonos 99	Kalloni, Lesbos	Greece	LM
1159	14th	Matthew†, Mark† Luke†	178	Leimonos Monastery, Ms. Lesbiacus Leimonos 99	Kalloni, Lesbos	Greece	INTF
1160	12th	Matthew, Mark, Luke†	368	Monastery of Saint John the Theologian, 58	Patmos	Greece	INTF
1160	12th	Theophylact Commentary on John	159	Monastery of Saint John the Theologian, 58	Patmos	Greece	INTF
[1160^{abs}]= 2887							
1161	1280	Acts, General Epistles, Pauline Epistles	253	Monastery of Saint John the Theologian, 14	Patmos	Greece	CSNTM
1162	11th	Acts (no commentary), General Epistles, Pauline Epistles	356	Monastery of Saint John the Theologian, 15	Patmos	Greece	INTF
1162	11th	Acts (no commentary), General Epistles, Pauline Epistles	356	Monastery of Saint John the Theologian, 15	Patmos	Greece	CSNTM
1163	1038	Gospels	270	Monastery of Saint John the Theologian, 76	Patmos	Greece	INTF
1163	1038	Gospels	270	Monastery of Saint John the Theologian, 76	Patmos	Greece	CSNTM
1164	11th	Gospels	255	Monastery of Saint John the Theologian, 80	Patmos	Greece	CSNTM
1164	11th	Gospels	255	Monastery of Saint John the Theologian, 80	Patmos	Greece	INTF
1165	1335	Gospels	299	Monastery of Saint John the Theologian, 81	Patmos	Greece	CSNTM
1165	1335	Gospels	299	Monastery of Saint John the Theologian, 81	Patmos	Greece	INTF
1166	10th	Gospels	309	Monastery of Saint John the Theologian, 82	Patmos	Greece	INTF
1166	10th	Gospels	309	Monastery of Saint John the Theologian, 82	Patmos	Greece	CSNTM
1167	11th/12th	Gospels	282	Monastery of Saint John the Theologian, 83	Patmos	Greece	INTF
1168	11th	Gospels	268	Monastery of Saint John the Theologian, 84	Patmos	Greece	INTF
1168	11th	Gospels	268	Monastery of Saint John the Theologian, 84	Patmos	Greece	CSNTM
1169	12th	Gospels †	196	Monastery of Saint John the Theologian, 90	Patmos	Greece	INTF
1170	11th	Gospels †	219	Monastery of Saint John the Theologian, 92	Patmos	Greece	INTF
1171	13th	Gospels	203	Monastery of Saint John the Theologian, 94	Patmos	Greece	INTF
1172	10th	Gospels	344	Monastery of Saint John the Theologian, 95	Patmos	Greece	INTF
1172	10th	Gospels	344	Monastery of Saint John the Theologian, 95	Patmos	Greece	CSNTM
1173	13th	Gospels	253	Monastery of Saint John the Theologian, 96	Patmos	Greece	INTF
1174	11th	Gospels †	157	Monastery of Saint John the Theologian, 97	Patmos	Greece	INTF
1175	10th	Acts†, General Epistles†, Pauline Epistles†	203	Monastery of Saint John the Theologian, 16	Patmos	Greece	INTF
1175	10th	Acts†, General Epistles†, Pauline Epistles†	203	Monastery of Saint John the Theologian, 16	Patmos	Greece	CSNTM
1176 + [2504]	13th	Gospels †	155	Monastery of Saint John the Theologian, 100 leaves, 238 fol. ebda, 739, 55 leaves fol. (Mt 12–23)	Patmos	Greece	INTF
1177	13th	Theophylact Commentary on Luke 11:14–24:53	112	Monastery of Saint John the Theologian, 117	Patmos	Greece	INTF
1178	13th	Zigabenus Commentary on Gospels	451	Monastery of Saint John the Theologian, 203	Patmos	Greece	INTF
1179	1282	Gospels	285	Monastery of Saint John the Theologian, 275	Patmos	Greece	CSNTM
1179	1282	Gospels	285	Monastery of Saint John the Theologian, 275	Patmos	Greece	INTF
1180	15th	Gospels	314	Monastery of Saint John the Theologian, 333	Patmos	Greece	INTF
1181	1368	Gospels	361	Monastery of Saint John the Theologian, 334	Patmos	Greece	INTF
1182	14th	Theophylact Commentary on the Gospels†	324	National Library, 2087	Athens	Greece	INTF
1183	14th	Theophylact Commentary on Mark†, John†	194	National Library, 2111	Athens	Greece	CSNTM
1184	13th	John^{K P}		Owner unknown. Formerly: J. G. Spyriu	Thessaloniki	Greece	
1185	14th	Gospels	258	Saint Catherine's Monastery, Gr. 148	Sinai	Egypt	LOC, CSNTM
1186	12th	Gospels	300	Saint Catherine's Monastery, Gr. 149	Sinai	Egypt	LOC, INTF, CSNTM
1187	11th	Gospels	307	Saint Catherine's Monastery, Gr. 150	Sinai	Egypt	LOC, CSNTM
1188	11th/12th	Gospels	261	Saint Catherine's Monastery, Gr. 151	Sinai	Egypt	LOC, INTF, CSNTM
1189	1346	Gospels	489	Saint Catherine's Monastery, Gr. 152	Sinai	Egypt	LOC, CSNTM
1190	12th	Gospels	421	Saint Catherine's Monastery, Gr. 153	Sinai	Egypt	LOC, INTF, CSNTM
1191	11th/12th	Gospels	247	Saint Catherine's Monastery, Gr. 154	Sinai	Egypt	LOC, INTF, CSNTM
1192	11th	Gospels	243	Saint Catherine's Monastery, Gr. 155	Sinai	Egypt	LOC, INTF, CSNTM
1193	12th	Gospels	192	Saint Catherine's Monastery, Gr. 156	Sinai	Egypt	LOC, CSNTM
1194	11th	Gospels	269	Saint Catherine's Monastery, Gr. 157	Sinai	Egypt	LOC, INTF, CSNTM
1195	11th	Gospels	308	Saint Catherine's Monastery, Gr. 158	Sinai	Egypt	LOC, INTF, CSNTM
1196	14th	Gospels	211	Saint Catherine's Monastery, Gr. 159	Sinai	Egypt	LOC, INTF, CSNTM
1197	12th	Gospels	385	Saint Catherine's Monastery, Gr. 160	Sinai	Egypt	LOC, CSNTM
1198	12th	Gospels	358	Saint Catherine's Monastery, Gr. 161	Sinai	Egypt	LOC, CSNTM
1199	12th	Gospels	308	Saint Catherine's Monastery, Gr. 162	Sinai	Egypt	LOC, CSNTM
1200	12th	Gospels †	279	Saint Catherine's Monastery, Gr. 163	Sinai	Egypt	LOC, INTF, CSNTM

[top]

== Minuscules 1201–1300 ==
#	Date	Contents	Pages	Institution and refs.	City, State	Country	Images
1201	13th	Gospels	245	Saint Catherine's Monastery, Gr. 164	Sinai	Egypt	LOC, INTF, CSNTM
1202	15th	Gospels	422	Saint Catherine's Monastery, Gr. 165	Sinai	Egypt	LOC, CSNTM
1203	10th	Gospels	200	Saint Catherine's Monastery, Gr. 166	Sinai	Egypt	LOC, INTF, CSNTM
1204	12th	Gospels	134	Saint Catherine's Monastery, Gr. 167	Sinai	Egypt	LOC, INTF, CSNTM
1205	13th	Gospels	254	Saint Catherine's Monastery, Gr. 168	Sinai	Egypt	LOC, CSNTM
1205	13th	Gospels	1	National Library of Russia, Gr. 313	Saint Petersburg	Russia	INTF
1206	1247	Gospels†	120	Saint Catherine's Monastery, Gr. 169	Sinai	Egypt	LOC, INTF, CSNTM
1206	1247	Gospels†	1	National Library of Russia, Gr. 308	Saint Petersburg	Russia	INTF
1207	11th	Gospels	285	Saint Catherine's Monastery, Gr. 170	Sinai	Egypt	LOC, INTF, CSNTM
1208	13th	Gospels	257	Saint Catherine's Monastery, Gr. 171	Sinai	Egypt	LOC, CSNTM
1209	1067	Gospels	207	Saint Catherine's Monastery, Gr. 172	Sinai	Egypt	LOC, INTF, CSNTM
1209	1067	Gospels	3	National Library of Russia, Gr. 291	Saint Petersburg	Russia	INTF
1210	11th	Gospels	246	Saint Catherine's Monastery, Gr. 173	Sinai	Egypt	LOC, INTF, CSNTM
1211	11th	Gospels	291	Saint Catherine's Monastery, Gr. 174	Sinai	Egypt	LOC, INTF, CSNTM
1211	11th	Gospels	3	National Library of Russia, Gr. 68	Saint Petersburg	Russia	INTF
1212	11th	Gospels	325	Saint Catherine's Monastery, Gr. 175	Sinai	Egypt	LOC, CSNTM
1213	13th	Gospels	302	Saint Catherine's Monastery, Gr. 176	Sinai	Egypt	LOC, CSNTM
1214	11th	Gospels	305	Saint Catherine's Monastery, Gr. 177	Sinai	Egypt	LOC, CSNTM
1215	13th	Gospels	200	Saint Catherine's Monastery, Gr. 178	Sinai	Egypt	LOC, INTF, CSNTM
1216	11th	Gospels	282	Saint Catherine's Monastery, Gr. 179	Sinai	Egypt	LOC, INTF, CSNTM
1217	1186	Gospels	261	Saint Catherine's Monastery, Gr. 180	Sinai	Egypt	LOC, INTF, CSNTM
1218	12th	Gospels	412	Saint Catherine's Monastery, Gr. 181	Sinai	Egypt	LOC, INTF, CSNTM
1219	11th	Gospels	261	Saint Catherine's Monastery, Gr. 182	Sinai	Egypt	LOC, INTF, CSNTM
1220	10th	Gospels†	125	Saint Catherine's Monastery, Gr. 183	Sinai	Egypt	LOC, CSNTM
1220	10th	Gospels†	3	National Library of Russia, Oct. 153	Saint Petersburg	Russia	INTF
1221	11th	Gospels†	185	Saint Catherine's Monastery, Gr. 184	Sinai	Egypt	LOC, CSNTM
1222	11th	Gospels	167	Saint Catherine's Monastery, Gr. 185	Sinai	Egypt	LOC, CSNTM
1223	10th	Gospels	232	Saint Catherine's Monastery, Gr. 186	Sinai	Egypt	LOC, INTF, CSNTM
1224	12th	Gospels	259	Saint Catherine's Monastery, Gr. 187	Sinai	Egypt	LOC, INTF, CSNTM
1225	10th	Gospels	248	Saint Catherine's Monastery, Gr. 188	Sinai	Egypt	LOC, INTF, CSNTM
1226	13th	Gospels	200	Saint Catherine's Monastery, Gr. 189	Sinai	Egypt	LOC, INTF, CSNTM
1227	12th + 14th	Gospels^{S}	267	Saint Catherine's Monastery, Gr. 190	Sinai	Egypt	LOC, INTF, CSNTM
1228	12th	Matthew 1:1-10:22†, 28:19-20, Luke† 6:3-24:53, John 1:1-20:11†	92	Saint Catherine's Monastery, Gr. 191	Sinai	Egypt	LOC, INTF, CSNTM
1229	13th	Gospels †	331	Saint Catherine's Monastery, Gr. 192	Sinai	Egypt	LOC, INTF, CSNTM
1230	1124	Gospels	328	Saint Catherine's Monastery, Gr. 193	Sinai	Egypt	LOC, INTF, CSNTM
1231 + [572]	12th	Mark 1:34-44; 2:14-8:3; 8:3-9:42.46-50	58	Saint Catherine's Monastery, Gr. 194, 58 fol.	Sinai	Egypt	LOC, INTF, CSNTM
1231 + [572]	12th	Mark 1:34-44; 2:14-8:3; 8:3-9:42.46-50	19	National Library of Russia, Gr. 99, 19 fol.	Saint Petersburg	Russia	INTF
1232	15th	Gospels †	204	Saint Catherine's Monastery, Gr. 195	Sinai	Egypt	LOC, CSNTM
1233	15th	Gospels	206	Saint Catherine's Monastery, Gr. 196	Sinai	Egypt	LOC, CSNTM
1234	14th	Gospels	155	Saint Catherine's Monastery, Gr. 197	Sinai	Egypt	LOC, CSNTM
1235	14th	Gospels	255	Saint Catherine's Monastery, Gr. 198	Sinai	Egypt	LOC, CSNTM
1236	14th	Gospels	162	Saint Catherine's Monastery, Gr. 199	Sinai	Egypt	LOC, INTF, CSNTM
1237	15th	Gospels	289	Saint Catherine's Monastery, Gr. 200	Sinai	Egypt	LOC, INTF, CSNTM
1238 + [2167]	1243	Matthew†, Luke†, John†	131	Saint Catherine's Monastery, Gr. 201	Sinai	Egypt	LOC, INTF, CSNTM
1238 + [2167]	1243	Matthew†, Luke†, John†	1	National Library of Russia, Gr. 396 (John 1:20-38)	Saint Petersburg	Russia	INTF
1239	16th	Gospels	392	Saint Catherine's Monastery, Gr. 203	Sinai	Egypt	LOC, INTF, CSNTM
1240	12th	Theophylact Commentary the Acts, General Epistles, & Pauline Epistles. Gospels (no commentary).	277	Saint Catherine's Monastery, Gr. 259	Sinai	Egypt	LOC, INTF, CSNTM
1241	12th	Gospels, Acts, General Epistles†, Pauline Epistles	193	Saint Catherine's Monastery, Gr. 260	Sinai	Egypt	LOC, CSNTM
1242	13th	Gospels, Acts, General Epistles, Pauline Epistles	273	Saint Catherine's Monastery, Gr. 261	Sinai	Egypt	LOC, INTF, CSNTM
1243	11th	Gospels, Acts, General Epistles, Pauline Epistles	281	Saint Catherine's Monastery, Gr. 262	Sinai	Egypt	LOC, INTF, CSNTM
1244	11th	Acts, General Epistles, Pauline epistles	279	Saint Catherine's Monastery, Gr. 274	Sinai	Egypt	LOC, INTF, CSNTM
1245	12th	Acts, General Epistles, Pauline epistles	344	Saint Catherine's Monastery, Gr. 275	Sinai	Egypt	LOC, INTF, CSNTM
1246	?	Gospels, Acts, General Epistles, Pauline Epistles		Owner unknown. Formerly Saint Catherine's Monastery, Gr. 265	?	?	
1247	15th	Gospels, Acts, General Epistles, Pauline Epistles	344	Saint Catherine's Monastery, Gr. 266	Sinai	Egypt	LOC, INTFCSNTM
1248	14th	New Testament	389	Saint Catherine's Monastery, Gr. 267	Sinai	Egypt	LOC, INTF, CSNTM
1249	1324	Acts†, General Epistles†, Pauline epistles†	313	Saint Catherine's Monastery, Gr. 276	Sinai	Egypt	LOC, CSNTM
1250	15th	Gospels†, Acts†, General Epistles†, Pauline Epistles†	319	Saint Catherine's Monastery, Gr. 269	Sinai	Egypt	LOC, INTF, CSNTM
1251	13th	Gospels†, Acts†, General Epistles†, Pauline Epistles†	268	Saint Catherine's Monastery, Gr. 270	Sinai	Egypt	LOC, INTF, CSNTM
1252	1306	Theophylact Commentary on the Gospels	350	Saint Catherine's Monastery, Gr. 302	Sinai	Egypt	LOC, CSNTM
1253	15th	Gospels†	209	Saint Catherine's Monastery, Gr. 303	Sinai	Egypt	LOC, INTF, CSNTM
1254	14th	Theophylact Commentary on Matthew	88	Saint Catherine's Monastery, Gr. 304	Sinai	Egypt	LOC, CSNTM
1255	13th	Theophylact Commentary on Luke†	321	Saint Catherine's Monastery, Gr. 305	Sinai	Egypt	LOC, CSNTM
1256	13th	Theophylact Commentary on Luke, John	197	Saint Catherine's Monastery, Gr. 306	Sinai	Egypt	LOC, CSNTM
[1257]	11th	Gospels†	251	Burned? Formerly: Evangelical School, Γ' 1	İzmir	Turkey	
[1258]	13th	Gospels	209	Burned? Formerly: Evangelical School, Γ' 2	İzmir	Turkey	
[1259]	15th	Gospels	290	Burned? Formerly: Evangelical School, Γ' 5	İzmir	Turkey	
1260	1460	Matthew	56	Library of the Municipality and of the Etruscan Academy of Cortona, 201	Cortona	Italy	INTF
1261	13th	Theophylact Commentary on the Gospels	345	National Library, Coislin 128	Paris	France	INTF
1262	14th	Theophylact Commentary on the Gospels	317	National Library, Coislin 129	Paris	France	INTF
1263	14th	Theophylact Commentary on the Gospels	435	National Library, Coislin 198	Paris	France	INTF
1264	15th	Luke (Nicetas Catena)	605	National Library, Coislin 201	Paris	France	INTF
1265	13th	Theophylact Commentary on the Gospels†	227	National Library, Coislin 203	Paris	France	BnF
1266	10th/11th	Gospels	433	National Library, Coislin 206	Paris	France	BnF
1267	14th	Theophylact Commentary on John†, Romans-Colossians†	299	National Library, Coislin 207	Paris	France	INTF
1268	13th	Theophylact Commentary on the Gospels	267	British Library, Add MS 19386	London	UK	BL
1268	13th	Theophylact Commentary on the Gospels	267	British Library, Add MS 19386	London	UK	INTF
1269	14th	Gospels	126	Vatican Library, Urb.gr.4	Vatican City	Vatican City	INTF
1270	11th	Acts, General Epistles, Pauline epistles	279	Estense Library, G. 71, α.W.2.7 (II C IV)	Modena	Italy	INTF, CSNTM
1271	14th	Theophylact Commentary on John†	44	National Library, 2110	Athens	Greece	INTF
1272	15th	Gospels†	299	National Library, 136	Athens	Greece	CSNTM
1273	1128	Gospels	200	Public Library, Ms. 29	Auckland	New Zealand	CSNTM
1273	1128	Gospels	200	Public Library, Ms. 29	Auckland	New Zealand	INTF
1274	11th	Matthew, Mark	33	British Library, Add MS 11859 (4 fol.). 11860 (29 fol.)	London	UK	BL
1275	12th	Luke-John†	39	Owner unknown, Formerly: Drew University, Ms. 4	Madison, NJ	USA	
1276	12th	Mark-Luke	79	Owner unknown, Formerly: Drew University, Ms. 5	Madison, NJ	USA	
1277	11th	Acts-2 Timothy†	276	Cambridge University Library, Add. Mss. 3046	Cambridge	UK	INTF
1278	12th	Gospels	352	John Rylands University Library, Gr. Ms. 17	Manchester	UK	INTF
1279	11th	Gospels	213	British Library, Add MS 34107	London	UK	BL
1279	11th	Gospels	213	British Library, Add MS 34107	London	UK	INTF
1280	15th	Gospels	175	British Library, Add MS 34108	London	UK	BL
1281 = [767]	10th	Gospels†	259	Fitzwilliam Museum, McClean Collection	Cambridge	UK	INTF
1282 = [2293]	12th	Gospels†	246	Lutheran School of Theology at Chicago, Gruber Ms. 44	Maywood, IL	USA	CSNTM
1283	14th	Mark 11:25-12:40†	2	Burgerbibliothek, Cod. 579.21, fol. 123, 124	Bern	Switzerland	
1284	12th	John 12:35-13:2†	1	University of Leipzig, Cod. Gr. 72	Leipzig	Germany	INTF
1285	13th	Gospels†	143	University of Göttingen, 8 Cod. Ms. theol. 29 Cim.	Göttingen	Germany	INTF
1286	11th	Gospels†	184	Library of the Serail, 34	Istanbul	Turkey	INTF
1287	13th	Gospels, Acts, General Epistles, Pauline Epistles	450	Owner unknown			
1288	12th/13th	Gospels	325	Vernadsky National Library, Ф. 301 (КДА) 25л	Kiev	Ukraine	INTF
1289	13th	Gospels	212	Newberry Library, Greek MS 2	Chicago	USA	INTF
1290	15th	Gospels†	267	University of Chicago Library, Ms. 46	Chicago	USA	TUOCL
1291	12th	Gospels†	260	National Library, Supplement Grec 1128	Paris	France	BnF, INTF
1292	13th	Gospels, Acts, General Epistles, Pauline Epistles	239	National Library, Supplement Grec 1224	Paris	France	BnF, INTF
1293	11th	Gospels†	270	National Library, Supplement Grec 1225	Paris	France	BnF, INTF
1294	13th	Gospels	249	National Library, Supplement Grec 1226	Paris	France	BnF
1295	9th	Gospels†	171	National Library, Supplement Grec 1257	Paris	France	BnF, INTF
1296	13th	Gospels	249	National Library, Supplement Grec 1258	Paris	France	BnF
1297	1290	Gospels, Acts, General Epistles, Pauline Epistles	319	National Library, Supplement Grec 1259	Paris	France	BnF, INTF
1298	13th	Gospels	232	National Library, Supplement Grec 1260	Paris	France	BnF
1299	13th	Gospels	309	National Library, Supplement Grec 1261	Paris	France	BnF
1300	11th	Gospels†	182	National Library, Supplement Grec 1265	Paris	France	BnF, INTF

[top]

== Minuscules 1301-1400 ==
#	Date	Contents	Pages	Institution and refs.	City, State	Country	Images
1301	12th	Gospels†	173	National Library, Supplement Grec 1266	Paris	France	BnF
1302	12th	Theophylact Commentary on the Gospels	575	Greek Orthodox Patriarchate, 88	Alexandria	Egypt	INTF
1303	1660	Gospels^{K}	431	Riom Library, 9 bis	Riom	France	INTF
1304	13th	Theophylact Commentary on the Gospels	302	Lost: Formerly Panagia Hozoviotissa Monastery, 6	Amorgos	Greece	
1305	1244	Gospels	269	Benaki Museum, MS 69	Athens	Greece	CSNTM
1306	13th	Gospels†	193	Panagia Hozoviotissa Monastery, 2	Amorgos	Greece	INTF
1307	14th	Gospels	204	Lost: Formerly, Panagia Hozoviotissa Monastery, 3	Amorgos	Greece	
1308	13th	Gospels	226	Lost: Formerly, Panagia Hozoviotissa Monastery, 4	Amorgos	Greece	
1309	11th	Gospels	277	State Historical Museum, F. 270. 1a.8 (Gr. 10)	Moscow	Russia	INTF
1310	12th/13th	Gospels†	174	State Historical Museum, S. 4	Moscow	Russia	INTF
1311	1090	Acts, General Epistles, Pauline epistles	330	Berlin State Library, Ham. 625	Berlin	Germany	INTF
1312	11th	Gospels†	264	Library of the Greek Orthodox Patriarchate, Taphos 25	Jerusalem		LOC, INTF, CSNTM
1313	11th	Gospels	212	Library of the Greek Orthodox Patriarchate, Taphos 28	Jerusalem		LOC, INTF, CSNTM
1314	11th	Gospels	295	Library of the Greek Orthodox Patriarchate, Taphos 31	Jerusalem		LOC, INTF, CSNTM
1315	12th	Gospels†, Acts†, General Epistles†, Pauline Epistles†	355	Library of the Greek Orthodox Patriarchate, Taphos 37	Jerusalem		LOC, CSNTM, INTF, CSNTM
1316	12th	Gospels	298	Library of the Greek Orthodox Patriarchate, Taphos 41	Jerusalem		LOC, INTF, CSNTM
1317	11th	Gospels†	248	Library of the Greek Orthodox Patriarchate, Taphos 42	Jerusalem		LOC, INTF, CSNTM
1318	12th	Gospels	275	Library of the Greek Orthodox Patriarchate, Taphos 46	Jerusalem		LOC, INTF, CSNTM
1319	12th	Gospels†, Acts†, General Epistles†, Pauline Epistles†	216	Library of the Greek Orthodox Patriarchate, Taphos 47	Jerusalem		LOC, INTF, CSNTM
1320	11th	Gospels	258	Library of the Greek Orthodox Patriarchate, Taphos 48	Jerusalem		LOC, INTF, CSNTM
1321	11th	Gospels	306	Library of the Greek Orthodox Patriarchate, Taphos 49	Jerusalem		LOC, INTF, CSNTM
1322	11th	Gospels	218	Library of the Greek Orthodox Patriarchate, Taphos 56	Jerusalem		LOC, CSNTM
1323	12th	Gospels	380	Library of the Greek Orthodox Patriarchate, Taphos 59	Jerusalem		LOC, INTF, CSNTM
1324	11th	Gospels	239	Library of the Greek Orthodox Patriarchate, Taphos 60	Jerusalem		LOC, INTF, CSNTM
1325	1724	Gospels	396	Library of the Greek Orthodox Patriarchate, Taphos 62	Jerusalem		LOC, INTF, CSNTM
1326	14th	Gospels	124	Library of the Greek Orthodox Patriarchate, Taphos 139	Jerusalem		LOC, INTF, CSNTM
1327	18th	Gospels (possibly copied from print ed.)	287	Library of the Greek Orthodox Patriarchate, Taphos 149	Jerusalem		LOC, CSNTM
1328	14th	Gospels, Revelation	210	Library of the Greek Orthodox Patriarchate, Sabas 101	Jerusalem		LOC, INTF, CSNTM
1329	12th	Gospels	137	Library of the Greek Orthodox Patriarchate, Sabas 166	Jerusalem		LOC, INTF, CSNTM
1329	12th	Gospels	2	Russian National Library	Saint Petersburg	Russia	INTF
1330	14th	Matthew†, Mark† Luke†	192	Library of the Greek Orthodox Patriarchate, Sabas 200, fol. 1-192	Jerusalem		LOC, CSNTM
1331	14th	Gospels	229	Library of the Greek Orthodox Patriarchate, Sabas 201	Jerusalem		LOC, INTF, CSNTM
1332	11th	Matthew†	239	Library of the Greek Orthodox Patriarchate, Sabas 232	Jerusalem		LOC, INTF, CSNTM
1333	11th	Gospels	189	Library of the Greek Orthodox Patriarchate, Sabas 243	Jerusalem		LOC, INTF, CSNTM
1334	13th/14th	Gospels†	357	Library of the Greek Orthodox Patriarchate, Sabas 244	Jerusalem		LOC, CSNTM
1334	13th/14th	Gospels†	2	Russian National Library, GR. 300	Saint Petersburg	Russia	INTF
1335	12th/13th	Gospels†	192	Library of the Greek Orthodox Patriarchate, Sabas 248	Jerusalem		LOC, INTF, CSNTM
1336 + [2170]	1331-2	Theophylact Commentary on the Gospels	442	Library of the Greek Orthodox Patriarchate, Sabas 262	Jerusalem		LOC, CSNTM
1336 + [2170]	1331-2	Theophylact Commentary on the Gospels	8	Russian National Library, Gr. 407	Saint Petersburg	Russia	INTF
1337	13th	Theophylact Commentary on Gospel of Mark, Gospel of Luke	288	Library of the Greek Orthodox Patriarchate, Sabas 263	Jerusalem		LOC, INTF, CSNTM
1338 + [2154]	12th	Gospels†	220	Library of the Greek Orthodox Patriarchate, Sabas 357	Jerusalem		LOC, INTF, CSNTM
1338 + [2154]	12th	Gospels†	3	Russian National Library, Gr. 295	Saint Petersburg	Russia	INTF
1339	13th	Gospels	331	Library of the Greek Orthodox Patriarchate, Sabas 358	Jerusalem		LOC, CSNTM
1340	11th	Gospels	195	Library of the Greek Orthodox Patriarchate, Sabas 359	Jerusalem		LOC, INTF, CSNTM
1341	12th/13th	Gospels	189	Library of the Greek Orthodox Patriarchate, Sabas 410	Jerusalem		LOC, CSNTM
1342	13th/14th	Gospels	258	Library of the Greek Orthodox Patriarchate, Sabas 411	Jerusalem		LOC, INTF, CSNTM
1343	11th	Gospels †	385	Library of the Greek Orthodox Patriarchate, Sabas 412	Jerusalem		LOC, INTF, CSNTM
1344	12th	Gospels †	219	Library of the Greek Orthodox Patriarchate, Sabas 413	Jerusalem		INTF, CSNTM
1345	14th	Gospels	422	Library of the Greek Orthodox Patriarchate, Sabas 572	Jerusalem		LOC, CSNTM
1346 + [2150]	10th/11th	Gospels	169	Library of the Greek Orthodox Patriarchate, Sabas 606	Jerusalem		LOC, INTF, CSNTM
1346 + [2150]	10th/11th	Gospels	2	National Library of Russia, Gr. 285	Saint Petersburg	Russia	INTF
1347	10th	Gospels †	289	Library of the Greek Orthodox Patriarchate, Sabas 644	Jerusalem		LOC, INTF, CSNTM
1348 + [2169]	15th	Gospels†	389	Library of the Greek Orthodox Patriarchate, Sabas 645	Jerusalem		LOC, CSNTM
1348 + [2169]	15th	Gospels†	4	National Library of Russia, Gr. 400	Saint Petersburg	Russia	INTF
1349	11th	Gospels†	130	Library of the Greek Orthodox Patriarchate, Stavros 45	Jerusalem		LOC, INTF, CSNTM
1350	12th	Gospels	311	Library of the Greek Orthodox Patriarchate, Stavros 46	Jerusalem		LOC, INTF, CSNTM
1351	10th	Gospels†	183	Library of the Greek Orthodox Patriarchate, Stavros 74	Jerusalem		LOC, INTF, CSNTM
1352	13th	Gospels, Acts, General Epistles, Pauline Epistles	235	Library of the Greek Orthodox Patriarchate, Stavros 94	Jerusalem		LOC, INTF, CSNTM
1353	12th/13th	Gospels	254	Library of the Greek Orthodox Patriarchate, Stavros 95	Jerusalem		LOC, INTF, CSNTM
1354	14th	Gospels, Acts, General Epistles, Pauline Epistles	237	Library of the Greek Orthodox Patriarchate, Stavros 101	Jerusalem		LOC, INTF, CSNTM
1355	12th	Gospels	330	Library of the Greek Orthodox Patriarchate, Stavros 104	Jerusalem		LOC, INTF, CSNTM
1356	14th	Gospels	303	Walters Art Museum, Ms. W. 532	Baltimore, MD	United States	WAM
1356	14th	Gospels	303	Walters Art Museum, Ms. W. 532	Baltimore, MD	United States	INTF, CSNTM
1357	10th	Gospels	192	Princeton University, Scheide Library, Scheide Ms. 70	Princeton, NJ	United States	INTF
1357	10th	Gospels	192	Princeton University, Scheide Library, Scheide Ms. 70	Princeton, NJ	United States	SL
1358	11th/12th	Gospels	258	Church of the Holy Sepulchre, Skevophylakion, 15	Jerusalem		INTF
1359 = [2327]	12th	Gospels, Acts, General Epistles, Pauline Epistles	336	National Library, Supplement Grec 1335	Paris	France	BnF, CSNTM
1360	12th	Acts, General Epistles, Pauline epistles	321	National Library, 207	Athens	Greece	CSNTM
1360	12th	Acts, General Epistles, Pauline epistles	321	National Library, 207	Athens	Greece	CSNTM (28)
1360	12th	Acts, General Epistles, Pauline epistles	7	Odesa National Scientific Library, 555	Odesa	Ukraine	INTF
1361	1156	Gospels	342	Museum of the Bible, G.C.MS.000484	Washington, DC	United States	CSNTM
1362	1539	Gospels	213	Zoodochos Pigi Monastery (Hagias), 53	Andros	Greece	INTF
1363	14th	Gospels	226	Zoodochos Pigi Monastery (Hagias), 56	Andros	Greece	INTF
1364	12th	Gospels	348	Library of the Greek Orthodox Patriarchate, Nea Syllogi (Photiu), 23	Jerusalem		LOC, INTF, CSNTM
1365	12th	Gospels	226	Library of the Greek Orthodox Patriarchate, Nea Syllogi (Photiu), 28	Jerusalem		LOC, INTF, CSNTM
1366	13th	Luke, John	127	Vatican Library, Ross.211	Vatican City	Vatican City	INTF
1367	15th	Gospels, Acts, General Epistles, Pauline Epistles	133	National Library, 1882	Athens	Greece	CSNTM
[1368] = 807							
[1369] = 2097							
1370	1542	John	295	Berlin State Library, Phil. 1420	Berlin	Germany	INTF
1371	16th/17th	Gospels, Pauline epistles	68	Berlin State Library, Phil. 1422	Berlin	Germany	INTF
1372	13th	Gospels†	278	National Library, Taphu 369	Athens	Greece	INTF
1373	11th	Gospels†	260	Turkish Historical Society, 26	Ankara	Turkey	INTF
1374	16th	Theophylact Commentary on Matthew, Mark	239	Berlin State Library, Phill. 1465	Berlin	Germany	INTF
1375	12th	Gospels	239	Russian State Library, F. 304/W.28 (Gr. 11)	Moscow	Russia	INTF
[1376]=1521							
1377	14th	Gospels	288	Ecclesiastical Byzantine Museum of Mytilene	Mytilene, Lesbos	Greece	EBMM
1377	14th	Gospels	288	Ecclesiastical Byzantine Museum of Mytilene	Mytilene, Lesbos	Greece	INTF
[1378]	10th	Gospels	349	Burnt? Formerly Lesbos, Mytilini, Symeon			
1379	10th	Gospels†	193	High School, 41	Mytilene, Lesbos	Greece	
1380	13th	Gospel of John^{P}	7	Jagiellonian Library, Graec. Qu. 68, fol. 1-7	Kraków	Poland	
1381	16th	Gospel of Matthew, John	286	Owner unknown, formerly: St. Nicholas Monastery, 2	Andros	Greece	
1382	14th	Gospels, Acts, General Epistles, Pauline Epistles	527	St. Nicholas Monastery, 26	Andros	Greece	
1383	15th	Gospels	250	Panachrantos Monastery, 11	Andros	Greece	INTF
1384	11th	New Testament†	296	Panachrantos Monastery, 13	Andros	Greece	INTF
1385	12th	Gospels	304	Monastery of Saint John the Theologian, 274	Patmos	Greece	INTF
1386	12th	Matthew, Mark, Luke, John 1:1-18:27†	241	Monastery of Saint John the Theologian, 276	Patmos	Greece	CSNTM
1386	12th	Matthew, Mark, Luke, John 1:1-18:27†	241	Monastery of Saint John the Theologian, 276	Patmos	Greece	INTF
1387	15th/16th	Theophylact Commentary on the Gospels†	378	Monastery of Saint John the Theologian, 360	Patmos	Greece	INTF
1388	15th	Gospels	167	Monastery of Saint John the Theologian, 698	Patmos	Greece	INTF
1389	15th	Gospels	254	Monastery of Saint John the Theologian, 699	Patmos	Greece	INTF
1390	14th	Gospels, Acts, General Epistles, Pauline Epistles	294	Stavronikita Monastery, 45	Mount Athos	Greece	MAR
1391	13th	Gospels	251	Pantokratoros Monastery, 34	Mount Athos	Greece	INTF
1392	10th	Gospels	328	Pantokratoros Monastery, 39	Mount Athos	Greece	INTF, CSNTM
1393	12th	Gospels	88	Pantokratoros Monastery, 45	Mount Athos	Greece	INTF, CSNTM
1394	1301	Gospels	345	Pantokratoros Monastery, 47	Mount Athos	Greece	INTF, CSNTM
1395	1366	Gospels	374	Borowski Collection (formerly Pantokratoros Monastery, 48)	Toronto	Canada	INTF, CSNTM
1396	14th	Gospels	271	Pantokratoros Monastery, 51	Mount Athos	Greece	INTF
1397	14th	Gospels	284	Pantokratoros Monastery, 52	Mount Athos	Greece	INTF
1397	14th	Gospels	2	Princeton University, y1956-118	Princeton,NJ	United States	PUAM
1398	13th	Gospels†, Acts†, General Epistles†, Pauline Epistles†	276	Pantokratoros Monastery, 56	Mount Athos	Greece	INTF
1399	13th	Gospels†	158	Pantokratoros Monastery, 57	Mount Athos	Greece	INTF
1400	13th	Gospels, Acts, General Epistles, Pauline Epistles	374	Pantokratoros Monastery, 58	Mount Athos	Greece	INTF

[top]

== Minuscules 1401-1500 ==
#	Date	Contents	Pages	Institution and refs.	City, State	Country	Images
1401	12th	Gospels †	220	Pantokratoros Monastery, 59	Mount Athos	Greece	INTF
1402	12th	Gospels	235	Pantokratoros Monastery, 60	Mount Athos	Greece	INTF
1403	14th	Gospels	163	Pantokratoros Monastery, 62	Mount Athos	Greece	INTF, CSNTM
1404	13th	Gospels, Acts, General Epistles, Pauline Epistles	547	Pantokratoros Monastery, 234	Mount Athos	Greece	INTF, CSNTM
1404	13th	Gospels, Acts, General Epistles, Pauline Epistles	547	Pantokratoros Monastery, 234	Mount Athos	Greece	Elpenor
1405	15th	Acts, General Epistles, Pauline epistles	273	National Library 208	Athens	Greece	CSNTM
1405	15th	Acts, General Epistles, Pauline epistles	273	National Library 208	Athens	Greece	INTF
1406	13th	Gospels	183	Esphigmenou Monastery, 207	Mount Athos	Greece	INTF
1407	13th	Gospels†	249	Docheiariou Monastery 43	Mount Athos	Greece	INTF
1408	12th	Gospels	271	Docheiariou Monastery 44	Mount Athos	Greece	INTF
1409	14th	Gospels†, Acts†, General Epistles†, Pauline Epistles†	226	Xeropotamou Monastery 244	Mount Athos	Greece	INTF
1410	14th	Gospels	274	National Library 92	Athens	Greece	CSNTM
1410	14th	Gospels	274	National Library 92	Athens	Greece	INTF
1411	11th	Commentary on the Gospel of Luke†, Gospel of John†	163	National Library 95	Athens	Greece	CSNTM
1412	10th	Matthew†, Luke†, John†	224	National Library 98	Athens	Greece	CSNTM
1412	10th	Matthew†, Luke†, John†	224	National Library 98	Athens	Greece	INTF
1413	11th	Gospels	231	National Library 113	Athens	Greece	CSNTM
1413	11th	Gospels	231	National Library 113	Athens	Greece	INTF
1414	16th	Gospels †	288	National Library 120	Athens	Greece	CSNTM
1414	16th	Gospels †	288	National Library 120	Athens	Greece	INTF
1415	12th	Gospels	189	National Library 123	Athens	Greece	CSNTM
1415	12th	Gospels	189	National Library 123	Athens	Greece	INTF
1416	12th	Gospels	181	National Library 128	Athens	Greece	CSNTM
1416	12th	Gospels	181	National Library 128	Athens	Greece	CSNTM (2)
1417	14th	Matthew, Mark, Luke	220	National Library 132	Athens	Greece	CSNTM
1417	14th	Matthew, Mark, Luke	220	National Library 132	Athens	Greece	CSNTM (3)
1417	14th	Matthew, Mark, Luke	220	National Library 132	Athens	Greece	INTF
1418	12th	Gospels	150	National Library 135	Athens	Greece	CSNTM
1419	15th	Gospels†	245	National Library 139	Athens	Greece	CSNTM
1420	13th	Matthew†, Mark†, Luke†	69	Basel University Library A. N. IV. 5a	Basel	Switzerland	INTF
1420	13th	Matthew†, Mark†, Luke†	2	Russian Academy of Sciences Hist. Inst. 44/669	Saint Petersburg	Russia	INTF
1421	10th	Gospels	285	The Schøyen Collection Ms 675	Oslo	Norway	SC
1421	10th	Gospels	285	The Schøyen Collection Ms 675	Oslo	Norway	INTF
1422	10th/11th	Gospels	385	Charles University in Prague XXV B 7	Prague	Czech Republic	INTF
1423	11th	Gospels	352	Duke University, KW Clark, Gk Ms 60	Durham, NC	USA	DU
1423	11th	Gospels	352	Duke University, KW Clark, Gk Ms 60	Durham, NC	USA	INTF
1424	9th/10th	New Testament	337	Kosinitza Monastery, returned by Lutheran School of Theology at Chicago, Gruber, 152)	Drama	Greece	CSNTM
1425	1125	Gospels, Acts, General Epistles, Pauline Epistles	269	Center for Slavic and Byzantine Studies, 358 (Looted from Kosinitza Monastery in 1917)	Sofia	Bulgaria	INTF
1426	10th	Gospels	316	Center for Slavic and Byzantine Studies, 338	Sofia	Bulgaria	INTF
1427	14th	Gospels	360	Center for Slavic and Byzantine Studies, 132	Sofia	Bulgaria	INTF
1428	1285	Gospels	315	Center for Slavic and Byzantine Studies, 339 (Looted from Kosinitza Monastery in 1917)	Sofia	Bulgaria	INTF
1429	11th	Gospels	222	Kosinitza Monastery, returned by Museum of the Bible, (MOTB.MS.000352)	Drama	Greece	Christie's
1430	11th	Gospels†	199	Owner unknown, formerly: Looted from Kosinitza Monastery in 1917, (220)			
1431	1471	Gospels	213	Center for Slavic and Byzantine Studies, 326	Sofia	Bulgaria	INTF
1432	12th	Gospels	224	Bible Museum, Ms. 3	Münster	Germany	CSNTM, INTF
1433	12th	Gospels†, Acts†, General Epistles†, Pauline Epistles†	267	Formerly, Skete of Saint Andrew, 9 (destroyed)	Mount Athos	Greece	
1434	12th	Gospels	167	Vatopedi Monastery, 886	Mount Athos	Greece	INTF
1435	11th	Gospels	404	Vatopedi Monastery, 937	Mount Athos	Greece	INTF
1436	13th	Gospels	212	Vatopedi Monastery, 942	Mount Athos	Greece	INTF
1437	12th	Luke	160	Vatopedi Monastery, 248	Mount Athos	Greece	INTF
1438	11th	Gospels	340	Vatopedi Monastery, 960	Mount Athos	Greece	INTF, CSNTM
1439	11th	Gospels	328	Great Lavra Monastery, A' 2	Mount Athos	Greece	INTF, CSNTM
1440	13th	Gospels†	206	Great Lavra Monastery, A' 3	Mount Athos	Greece	INTF
1441	12th	Gospels	210	Great Lavra Monastery, A' 4	Mount Athos	Greece	INTF
1442	13th	Gospels	301	Great Lavra Monastery, A' 5	Mount Athos	Greece	INTF
1443	1047	Gospels	308	Great Lavra Monastery, A' 6	Mount Athos	Greece	INTF, CSNTM
1444	11th	Gospels	349	Great Lavra Monastery, A' 7	Mount Athos	Greece	INTF, CSNTM
1445	1323	Gospels	278	Great Lavra Monastery, A' 8	Mount Athos	Greece	INTF, CSNTM
1446	13th	Gospels	187	Great Lavra Monastery, A' 9	Mount Athos	Greece	INTF
1447	1337	Gospels	230	Great Lavra Monastery, A' 10	Mount Athos	Greece	INTF, CSNTM
1448	12th	Gospels, Acts, General Epistles, Pauline Epistles	256	Great Lavra Monastery, A' 13	Mount Athos	Greece	INTF, CSNTM
1449	11th	Gospels†	319	Great Lavra Monastery, A' 14	Mount Athos	Greece	INTF, CSNTM
1450	12th	Gospels	274	Great Lavra Monastery, A' 17	Mount Athos	Greece	INTF
1451	12th/13th	Gospels†	254	Great Lavra Monastery, A' 18	Mount Athos	Greece	INTF
1452	992	Gospels	266	Great Lavra Monastery, A' 19	Mount Athos	Greece	CSNTM
1453	12th	Gospels	207	Great Lavra Monastery, A' 20	Mount Athos	Greece	INTF
1454	12th	Gospels	256	Great Lavra Monastery, A' 21	Mount Athos	Greece	INTF
1455	11th/12th	Gospels	283	Great Lavra Monastery, A' 22	Mount Athos	Greece	INTF, CSNTM
1456	13th	Gospels†, Acts†, General Epistles†, Pauline Epistles†	227	Great Lavra Monastery, A' 24	Mount Athos	Greece	INTF
1457	12th/13th	Gospels†	254	Great Lavra Monastery, A' 25	Mount Athos	Greece	INTF
1458	10th	Gospels	323	Great Lavra Monastery, A' 26	Mount Athos	Greece	INTF, CSNTM
1459	12th	Gospels†	214	Great Lavra Monastery, A' 27	Mount Athos	Greece	INTF
1460	12th	Gospels	263	Great Lavra Monastery, A' 28	Mount Athos	Greece	INTF
1461	13th	Gospels	332	Great Lavra Monastery, A' 29	Mount Athos	Greece	INTF
1462	14th	Gospels	265	Great Lavra Monastery, A' 31	Mount Athos	Greece	INTF
1463	13th	Gospels	213	Great Lavra Monastery, A' 32	Mount Athos	Greece	INTF
1464	12th/13th	Gospels	292	Great Lavra Monastery, A' 33	Mount Athos	Greece	INTF
1465	13th	Gospels	308	Great Lavra Monastery, A' 34	Mount Athos	Greece	INTF
1466	1270	Gospels	233	Great Lavra Monastery, A' 35	Mount Athos	Greece	INTF, CSNTM
1467	14th	Gospels	343	Great Lavra Monastery, A' 36	Mount Athos	Greece	INTF
1468	13th	Gospels	245	Great Lavra Monastery, A' 37	Mount Athos	Greece	INTF
1469	13th	Gospels†	174	Great Lavra Monastery, A' 38	Mount Athos	Greece	INTF
1470	11th	Gospels	215	Great Lavra Monastery, A' 39	Mount Athos	Greece	INTF, CSNTM
1471	13th	Gospels	396	Great Lavra Monastery, A' 40	Mount Athos	Greece	INTF
1472	13th	Gospels	306	Great Lavra Monastery, A' 41	Mount Athos	Greece	INTF
1473	11th	Gospels	227	Great Lavra Monastery, A' 42	Mount Athos	Greece	INTF
1474	12th	Gospels	416	Great Lavra Monastery, A' 44	Mount Athos	Greece	INTF
1474	12th	Gospels	2	Walters Art Museum, Ms. W. 530d,e	Baltimore, MD	USA	WAM
1475	12th	Gospels	279	Great Lavra Monastery, A' 45	Mount Athos	Greece	INTF
1476	1333	Gospels	349	Great Lavra Monastery, A' 46	Mount Athos	Greece	INTF, CSNTM
1477	13th	Gospels	286	Great Lavra Monastery, A' 47	Mount Athos	Greece	INTF
1478	11th/12th	Gospels†	229	Great Lavra Monastery, A' 48	Mount Athos	Greece	INTF, CSNTM
1479	13th	Gospels	266	Great Lavra Monastery, A' 49	Mount Athos	Greece	INTF
1480	14th	Gospels	243	Great Lavra Monastery, A' 50	Mount Athos	Greece	INTF
1481	12th	Gospels	222	Great Lavra Monastery, A' 52	Mount Athos	Greece	INTF
1482	1304	Gospels, Acts, General Epistles, Pauline Epistles	395	Great Lavra Monastery, A' 54	Mount Athos	Greece	INTF
1483	11th	Gospels	272	Great Lavra Monastery, A' 57	Mount Athos	Greece	INTF, CSNTM
1484	13th	Gospels	299	Great Lavra Monastery, A' 59	Mount Athos	Greece	INTF
1485	12th	Gospels	227	Great Lavra Monastery, A' 60	Mount Athos	Greece	INTF
1486	1098	Gospels	239	Great Lavra Monastery, A' 61	Mount Athos	Greece	INTF, CSNTM
1487	13th	Gospels	275	Great Lavra Monastery, A' 62	Mount Athos	Greece	INTF
1488	14th	Gospels	271	Great Lavra Monastery, A' 63	Mount Athos	Greece	INTF
1489	12th	Gospels	287	Great Lavra Monastery, A' 64	Mount Athos	Greece	INTF
1490	12th	Gospels, Acts, General Epistles, Pauline Epistles	309	Great Lavra Monastery, A' 65	Mount Athos	Greece	INTF
1491	13th	Gospels	195	Great Lavra Monastery, A' 66	Mount Athos	Greece	INTF
1492	1342	Gospels	343	Great Lavra Monastery, A' 67	Mount Athos	Greece	INTF, CSNTM
1493	14th	Gospels	182	Great Lavra Monastery, A' 68	Mount Athos	Greece	INTF
1494	13th	Gospels	267	Great Lavra Monastery, A' 69	Mount Athos	Greece	INTF
1495	14th	Gospels, General Epistles, Pauline Epistles†	263	Great Lavra Monastery, A' 73	Mount Athos	Greece	INTF
1496	13th	Gospels	287	Great Lavra Monastery, A' 74	Mount Athos	Greece	INTF
1497	13th	Gospels	348	Great Lavra Monastery, A' 75	Mount Athos	Greece	INTF
1498	13th	Gospels	217	Great Lavra Monastery, A' 76	Mount Athos	Greece	INTF
1498	13th	Gospels	2	Walters Art Museum, Ms. W. 530f,g	Baltimore, MD	USA	WAM
1498	13th	Gospels	1	H.R. Willoughby, Ms. 2	Chicago, IL	USA	INTF
1498	13th	Gospels	1	National School of Fine Arts	Paris	France	INTF
1499	13th	Gospels	230	Great Lavra Monastery, A' 77	Mount Athos	Greece	INTF
1500	9th	Matthew† 4:18-28:20, Mark 1:1-15:16†	156	Great Lavra Monastery, A' 78	Mount Athos	Greece	INTF

[top]

== Minuscules 1501-1600 ==
#	Date	Contents	Pages	Institution and refs.	City, State	Country	Images
1501	13th	Gospels, Acts, General Epistles, Pauline Epistles	202	Great Lavra Monastery, Λ' 79	Mount Athos	Greece	INTF
1502	13th	Gospels	408	Great Lavra Monastery, Λ' 87	Mount Athos	Greece	INTF
1503	1317	New Testament	263	Great Lavra Monastery, Λ' 99	Mount Athos	Greece	INTF, CSNTM
1504	14th	Luke†, John†	93	Great Lavra Monastery, Λ' 109	Mount Athos	Greece	INTF
1505	12th	Gospels, Acts, General Epistles, Pauline Epistles	273	Great Lavra Monastery, B' 26	Mount Athos	Greece	INTF, CSNTM
1506	1320	Gospels^{K}, Romans^{K}, 1 Corinthians 1:1-4:15^{K}†	338	Great Lavra Monastery, B' 89	Mount Athos	Greece	INTF
1507	10th	Gospels†	252	Great Lavra Monastery,B' 113	Mount Athos	Greece	INTF, CSNTM
1508	15th	Gospels†, Acts†, General Epistles†, Pauline Epistles†	449	Great Lavra Monastery, Γ' 30	Mount Athos	Greece	INTF
1509	13th	Matthew† 17:25-28:20, Mark - Acts, Pauline Epistles, General Epistles	332	Great Lavra Monastery, B' 53	Mount Athos	Greece	INTF
1510	11th	Gospels†	211	Great Lavra Monastery, Γ' 48	Mount Athos	Greece	INTF, CSNTM
1511	13th	Gospels	138	Great Lavra Monastery, Γ' 49	Mount Athos	Greece	INTF
1512	14th	Gospels†	136	Great Lavra Monastery, Γ' 50	Mount Athos	Greece	INTF
1513	11th	Gospels†	169	Great Lavra Monastery, Γ' 53	Mount Athos	Greece	INTF, CSNTM
1514	11th	Gospels	261	Great Lavra Monastery, Γ' 54	Mount Athos	Greece	INTF, CSNTM
1515	13th	Gospels†	164	Great Lavra Monastery, Γ' 55	Mount Athos	Greece	INTF
1516	14th	Theophylact Commentary on Matthew†, John†	104	Great Lavra Monastery, Γ' 56	Mount Athos	Greece	INTF
1517	11th	Gospels†	265	Great Lavra Monastery, Γ' 58	Mount Athos	Greece	INTF, CSNTM
[1518] = 1896							
1519	11th	Gospels	179	Great Lavra Monastery, Γ' 100	Mount Athos	Greece	INTF, CSNTM
1520	11th	Luke†, John†	80	Great Lavra Monastery, Γ' 101	Mount Athos	Greece	INTF, CSNTM
1521	1084	Gospels, Acts, General Epistles, Pauline Epistles	253	Dumbarton Oaks, Ms. 3, acc. no. 62.35, fol. 88-253, 255-341	Washington, DC	USA	HL
1521	1084	Gospels, Acts, General Epistles, Pauline Epistles	1	Cleveland Museum of Art, Acc. 50.154, 1 fol. (fol. 254, 1 Peter 1:1-21)	Cleveland, OH	USA	CMA
1521	1084	Gospels, Acts, General Epistles, Pauline Epistles	1	The State Tretyakov Gallery, 2580, fol. 187bis (John 1:1-26)	Moscow	Russia	INTF
[1522] = 1890							
1523	13th/14th	Theophylact Commentary on 1 John, 2 John, 3 John, Jude, Romans, 2 Corinthians - Colossians	153	Austrian National Library, Cod. Theol. gr. 141	Vienna	Austria	INTF, CSNTM
1524	14th	Theophylact Commentary on Acts, General Epistles, Pauline epistles	331	Austrian National Library, Cod. Theol. gr. 150	Vienna	Austria	INTF, CSNTM
1525	13th	Acts†, General Epistles†, Pauline epistles†	187	Jagiellonian Library, Graec. Qu. 57, fol. 101-187	Kraków	Poland	
1526	12th	Acts, James	48	National Library, Grec 906	Paris	France	BnF, INTF
1527	14th	Matthew^{K}†, Mark^{K}†, Luke^{K}†	229	Formerly, Skete of Saint Andrew, 29 (destroyed)	Mount Athos	Greece	
1528	1136	Gospels	278	Princeton University Library, Garrett MS. 3	Princeton	USA	CSNTM, PUL
1528	1136	Gospels	278	Princeton University Library, Garrett MS. 3	Princeton	USA	INTF
1529	12th	Gospels	282	Formerly, Skete of Saint Andrew, 709 (destroyed)	Mount Athos	Greece	
1530	12th/13th	Gospels	329	Princeton University Library, Garrett MS. 2	Princeton, NJ	USA	CSNTM PUL
1530	12th/13th	Gospels	329	Princeton University Library, Garrett MS. 2	Princeton, NJ	USA	INTF
1531	11th/12th	Gospels	258	Walters Art Museum, Ms. W. 526	Baltimore, MD	USA	WAM
1532	14th/15th	Gospels	232	Vatopedi Monastery, 1209	Mount Athos	Greece	INTF
1533	1236	Theophylact Commentary on the Gospels	409	Vatopedi Monastery, 244	Mount Athos	Greece	INTF, CSNTM
1534	14th	Theophylact Commentary on the Gospels†	443	Vatopedi Monastery, 246	Mount Athos	Greece	INTF
1535	15th	Gospels	325	Vatopedi Monastery, 247, fol. 1-325	Mount Athos	Greece	INTF
1536	13th	Theophylact Commentary on the Gospels	404	Vatopedi Monastery, 249	Mount Athos	Greece	INTF
1537	15th	Theophylact Commentary on Mark, Luke	267	Vatopedi Monastery, 250	Mount Athos	Greece	INTF
1538	13th/14th	Gospels	284	Vatopedi Monastery, 882	Mount Athos	Greece	INTF
1539	12th	Gospels	339	Vatopedi Monastery, 884	Mount Athos	Greece	INTF, CSNTM
1540	11th/12th	Gospels	298	Vatopedi Monastery, 885	Mount Athos	Greece	INTF, CSNTM
1541	13th	Gospels	398	Vatopedi Monastery, 887	Mount Athos	Greece	INTF
1542	12th/13th	Gospels†	241	Vatopedi Monastery, 897	Mount Athos	Greece	INTF, CSNTM
1543	1355	Gospels	237	Vatopedi Monastery, 898	Mount Athos	Greece	INTF, CSNTM
1544	14th	Gospels	219	Vatopedi Monastery, 899	Mount Athos	Greece	INTF
1545	11th	Gospels	302	Vatopedi Monastery, 900	Mount Athos	Greece	INTF, CSNTM
1546	1263	Gospels	157	Vatopedi Monastery, 896	Mount Athos	Greece	INTF, CSNTM
1547	1339	Gospels†	255	Vatopedi Monastery, 901	Mount Athos	Greece	INTF, CSNTM
1548	1359	Gospels†, Acts†, General Epistles†, Pauline Epistles†	350	Vatopedi Monastery, 902	Mount Athos	Greece	INTF, CSNTM
1549	13th/14th	Gospels	372	Vatopedi Monastery, 905	Mount Athos	Greece	INTF
1550	13th/14th	Gospels	245	Vatopedi Monastery, 910	Mount Athos	Greece	INTF
1551	13th	Gospels, Revelation	264	Vatopedi Monastery, 913	Mount Athos	Greece	INTF
1552	13th/14th	Gospels†	299	Vatopedi Monastery, 914	Mount Athos	Greece	INTF
1553	14th	Gospels	340	Vatopedi Monastery, 915	Mount Athos	Greece	INTF
1554	14th	Gospels†	305	Vatopedi Monastery, 917	Mount Athos	Greece	INTF, CSNTM
1555	13th	Gospels	298	Vatopedi Monastery, 918	Mount Athos	Greece	INTF
1556	1068	Gospels	251	Vatopedi Monastery, 919	Mount Athos	Greece	INTF, CSNTM
1557	1293	Gospels	264	Vatopedi Monastery, 920	Mount Athos	Greece	INTF, CSNTM
1558	13th/14th	Gospels	225	Vatopedi Monastery, 921	Mount Athos	Greece	INTF, CSNTM
1559	14th	Gospels	257	Vatopedi Monastery, 922	Mount Athos	Greece	INTF
1560	14th	Gospels†	292	Vatopedi Monastery, 923	Mount Athos	Greece	INTF
1561	12th/13th	Gospels†	226	Vatopedi Monastery, 926	Mount Athos	Greece	INTF, CSNTM
1562	12th	Gospels†	322	Vatopedi Monastery, 928	Mount Athos	Greece	INTF
1563	13th	Gospels†, Acts, General Epistles, Romans - Colossians 1:18†	307	Vatopedi Monastery, 929	Mount Athos	Greece	INTF, CSNTM
1564	1300	Gospels†	291	Vatopedi Monastery, 930	Mount Athos	Greece	INTF, CSNTM
1565	13th	Gospels†	272	Vatopedi Monastery,931	Mount Athos	Greece	INTF
1566	11th/12th	Gospels†	128	Vatopedi Monastery, 932	Mount Athos	Greece	INTF, CSNTM
1567	13th	Gospels†	184	Vatopedi Monastery, 933	Mount Athos	Greece	INTF
1568	14th	Gospels†	137	Vatopedi Monastery, 934	Mount Athos	Greece	INTF
1569	1307	Gospels†	157	Vatopedi Monastery,935	Mount Athos	Greece	INTF, CSNTM
1570	11th	Gospels	352	Vatopedi Monastery, 936	Mount Athos	Greece	INTF, CSNTM
1571	13th/14th	Gospels†	258	Vatopedi Monastery, 927	Mount Athos	Greece	INTF
1572	1304	Gospels	230	Vatopedi Monastery, 938	Mount Athos	Greece	INTF, CSNTM
1573	12th/13th	Gospels†, Acts†, General Epistles†, Pauline Epistles†	359	Vatopedi Monastery, 939	Mount Athos	Greece	INTF, CSNTM
1574	14th	Gospels†	229	Vatopedi Monastery, 940	Mount Athos	Greece	INTF
1575	13th	Gospels	408	Vatopedi Monastery, 941	Mount Athos	Greece	INTF
1576	13th	Gospels	274	Vatopedi Monastery, 943	Mount Athos	Greece	INTF
1577	1303	Gospels	282	Vatopedi Monastery, 944	Mount Athos	Greece	INTF, CSNTM
1578	13th	Gospels	189	Vatopedi Monastery, 945	Mount Athos	Greece	INTF
1579	11th	Gospels	265	Vatopedi Monastery, 946	Mount Athos	Greece	INTF, CSNTM
1580	13th/14th	Gospels†	129	Vatopedi Monastery, 947	Mount Athos	Greece	INTF
1581	14th	Gospels	329	Vatopedi Monastery, 948	Mount Athos	Greece	INTF
1582	948	Gospels	287	Vatopedi Monastery, 949	Mount Athos	Greece	INTF, CSNTM
1583	12th	Gospels	201	Vatopedi Monastery, 950	Mount Athos	Greece	INTF, CSNTM
1584	14th	Gospels	256	Vatopedi Monastery, 951	Mount Athos	Greece	INTF
1585	13th	Gospels	295	Vatopedi Monastery, 953	Mount Athos	Greece	INTF
1586	13th	Gospels	332	Vatopedi Monastery, 954	Mount Athos	Greece	INTF
1587	13th	Gospels†	230	Vatopedi Monastery, 955	Mount Athos	Greece	INTF
1588	13th	Gospels	241	Vatopedi Monastery, 956	Mount Athos	Greece	INTF
1589	12th	Gospels	329	Vatopedi Monastery, 957	Mount Athos	Greece	INTF
1590	12th	Gospels	138	Vatopedi Monastery, 958	Mount Athos	Greece	INTF
1591	1579	Gospels†	298	Vatopedi Monastery, 952	Mount Athos	Greece	MAR
1592	1445	Gospels	424	Vatopedi Monastery, 959	Mount Athos	Greece	INTF, CSNTM
1593	13th	Matthew† 14:6-28:20, Mark - John	113	Vatopedi Monastery, 961	Mount Athos	Greece	INTF
1594	1284	Gospels†, Acts†, General Epistles†, Pauline Epistles†	362	Vatopedi Monastery, 962	Mount Athos	Greece	INTF, CSNTM
1595	13th	Gospels, Acts, General Epistles, Pauline Epistles	295	Vatopedi Monastery,964	Mount Athos	Greece	INTF
1596	13th	Gospels	263	Vatopedi Monastery, 965	Mount Athos	Greece	INTF
1597	1289	New Testament	515	Vatopedi Monastery, 966	Mount Athos	Greece	INTF, CSNTM
1598	14th	Gospels†, Acts†, General Epistles†, Pauline Epistles†	344	Vatopedi Monastery, 967	Mount Athos	Greece	INTF
1599	14th	Gospels†, Acts†, General Epistles†, Pauline Epistles†	352	Vatopedi Monastery, 963	Mount Athos	Greece	INTF
1600	14th	Gospels	274	Vatopedi Monastery, 970	Mount Athos	Greece	INTF

[top]

== Minuscules 1601-1700 ==
#	Date	Contents	Pages	Institution and refs.	City, State	Country	Images
1601	13th	Gospels†	119	Vatopedi Monastery, 971	Mount Athos	Greece	INTF
1602	14th	Gospels	223	Vatopedi Monastery, 974	Mount Athos	Greece	INTF
1603	12th	Gospels	244	Vatopedi Monastery, 975	Mount Athos	Greece	INTF
1604	13th	Gospels	215	Vatopedi Monastery, 976	Mount Athos	Greece	INTF
1605	1342	Gospels	212	Vatopedi Monastery, 978, fol. 3-214	Mount Athos	Greece	INTF, CSNTM
1606	13th	Gospels	186	Vatopedi Monastery, 979	Mount Athos	Greece	INTF
1607	11th	Mark†, Luke†	127	Vatopedi Monastery, 891	Mount Athos	Greece	INTF, CSNTM
1608	14th	Gospels†	144	Iviron Monastery, 635	Mount Athos	Greece	INTF
1609	13th	Gospels, Acts, General Epistles, Pauline Epistles	387	Great Lavra Monastery, A' 90	Mount Athos	Greece	INTF
1610	1463	Acts†, General Epistles†, Pauline Epistles†	246	National Library, 209	Athens	Greece	CSNTM
1611	10th	Acts, General Epistles, Pauline Epistles, Revelation	312	National Library, 94	Athens	Greece	CSNTM
1611	10th	Acts, General Epistles, Pauline Epistles, Revelation	312	National Library, 94	Athens	Greece	INTF
1612	12th	Gospels†	158	Great Lavra Monastery, G' 29	Mount Athos	Greece	INTF
1613	12th	Theophylact Commentary on Gospel of Matthew, John	277	Great Lavra Monastery, D' 85	Mount Athos	Greece	INTF
1614	1324	Gospels†	195	Great Lavra Monastery, E' 117, fol. 1-195	Mount Athos	Greece	INTF, CSNTM
1615	16th	Gospels	302	Great Lavra Monastery, E' 140	Mount Athos	Greece	INTF
1616	15th	Theophylact Commentary on the Gospels†	358	Great Lavra Monastery, E' 149	Mount Athos	Greece	INTF
1617	15th	New Testament	362	Great Lavra Monastery, E' 157	Mount Athos	Greece	INTF
1618	14th	Gospels†, Acts†, General Epistles†, Pauline Epistles†	175	Great Lavra Monastery, E' 164	Mount Athos	Greece	INTF
1619	14th	Gospels†, Acts†, General Epistles†, Pauline Epistles†	215	Great Lavra Monastery, E' 175	Mount Athos	Greece	INTF
1620	14th	Gospels	191	Great Lavra Monastery, E' 179, fol. 1-191	Mount Athos	Greece	INTF
1621	14th	Gospels†	186	Great Lavra Monastery, E' 181	Mount Athos	Greece	INTF
1622	14th	Gospels†, Acts†, General Epistles†, Pauline Epistles†	352	Great Lavra Monastery, W' 1	Mount Athos	Greece	INTF
1623	14th	Gospels	215	Great Lavra Monastery, W' 5	Mount Athos	Greece	INTF
1624	15th	Gospels	293	Great Lavra Monastery, W' 9	Mount Athos	Greece	INTF
1625	15th	Gospels	318	Great Lavra Monastery, W' 12	Mount Athos	Greece	INTF
1626	15th	Gospels, Acts, General Epistles, Pauline Epistles, Revelation 1:1-9:15†	272	Great Lavra Monastery, W' 16	Mount Athos	Greece	INTF
1627	16th	Gospels	452	Great Lavra Monastery, W' 19	Mount Athos	Greece	INTF
1628	1400	Theophylact Commentary on Gospels, Acts, General Epistles, Pauline Epistles	260	Great Lavra Monastery, W' 20	Mount Athos	Greece	INTF, CSNTM
1629	1653	Gospels†	86	Great Lavra Monastery, W' 102	Mount Athos	Greece	INTF
1630	1314	Gospels	340	Great Lavra Monastery, W' 107	Mount Athos	Greece	INTF, CSNTM
1631	18th	Gospel of Matthew†	140	Great Lavra Monastery, W' 111	Mount Athos	Greece	INTF
1632	14th	Gospels	269	Great Lavra Monastery, W' 113	Mount Athos	Greece	INTF
1633	14th	Gospels	206	Great Lavra Monastery, W' 118	Mount Athos	Greece	INTF
1634	14th	Gospels	257	Great Lavra Monastery, W' 125	Mount Athos	Greece	INTF
1635	15th	Gospels	151	Great Lavra Monastery, W' 127	Mount Athos	Greece	INTF
1636	15th	Gospels†, Acts†, General Epistles†, Pauline Epistles†	298	Great Lavra Monastery, W' 139	Mount Athos	Greece	INTF
1637	1328	New Testament	294	Great Lavra Monastery, W' 141	Mount Athos	Greece	INTF
1638	14th	Gospels†	232	Great Lavra Monastery, L' 101	Mount Athos	Greece	INTF
1639	17th	Gospels	340	Great Lavra Monastery, L' 119	Mount Athos	Greece	INTF
1640	18th	Gospels	275	Great Lavra Monastery, L' 120	Mount Athos	Greece	INTF
1641	15th	Gospels	184	Great Lavra Monastery, L' 121	Mount Athos	Greece	INTF
1642	1278	Gospels, Acts, General Epistles, Pauline Epistles	321	Great Lavra Monastery, L' 128	Mount Athos	Greece	INTF
1643	14th	Gospels†, Acts†, General Epistles†, Pauline Epistles†	444	Great Lavra Monastery, L' 134	Mount Athos	Greece	INTF
1644	17th	Matthew† 20:2-28:20, Mark, Luke, John	225	Great Lavra Monastery, L' 147	Mount Athos	Greece	INTF
1645	1303	Gospels	353	Great Lavra Monastery, L' 169	Mount Athos	Greece	INTF
1646	1172	Gospels, Acts, General Epistles, Pauline Epistles	343	Great Lavra Monastery, L' 173	Mount Athos	Greece	INTF
1647	1274	Gospels	146	Great Lavra Monastery, L' 174, fol. 5-150	Mount Athos	Greece	INTF
1648	15th	Gospels†	245	Great Lavra Monastery, L' 175	Mount Athos	Greece	INTF
1649	15th	Gospels, Acts, General Epistles, Pauline Epistles	358	Great Lavra Monastery, L' 182	Mount Athos	Greece	INTF
1650	14th	Gospels†	245	Great Lavra Monastery, L' 184	Mount Athos	Greece	INTF
1651	15th	Gospels†	324	Great Lavra Monastery, Q' 80	Mount Athos	Greece	INTF
1652	16th	New Testament†	506	Great Lavra Monastery, Q' 152	Mount Athos	Greece	INTF
1653	15th	Gospels	214	Great Lavra Monastery, H' 48	Mount Athos	Greece	INTF
1654	1326	Matthew† 9:16-28:20, Mark, Luke, John	208	Great Lavra Monastery, H' 54	Mount Athos	Greece	INTF
1655	14th	Gospels†	171	Great Lavra Monastery, H' 63	Mount Athos	Greece	INTF
1656	15th	Gospels†, Acts†, General Epistles†, Pauline Epistles†	294	Great Lavra Monastery, H' 64	Mount Athos	Greece	INTF
1657	14th	Gospels†	276	Great Lavra Monastery, H' 79	Mount Athos	Greece	INTF
1658	14th	Gospels†	204	Great Lavra Monastery, H' 82	Mount Athos	Greece	INTF
1659	14th	Gospels†	246	Great Lavra Monastery, H' 89	Mount Athos	Greece	INTF
1660	14th	Gospels†	177	Great Lavra Monastery, H' 159	Mount Athos	Greece	INTF
1661	14th	Gospels†, Acts†, General Epistles†, Pauline Epistles†	173	Great Lavra Monastery, H' 163	Mount Athos	Greece	INTF
1662	10th	Matthew†, Mark† Luke†	124	St. Panteleimon Monastery, 8	Mount Athos	Greece	INTF
1663	10th	Gospels†	271	St. Panteleimon Monastery, 9	Mount Athos	Greece	INTF
1664	13th	Gospels	195	St. Panteleimon Monastery, 10	Mount Athos	Greece	INTF
1665	12th	Gospels	245	St. Panteleimon Monastery, 11	Mount Athos	Greece	INTF
1666	13th	Gospels†	288	St. Panteleimon Monastery, 13	Mount Athos	Greece	INTF
1667	1309	Gospels	232	St. Panteleimon Monastery, 14	Mount Athos	Greece	INTF
1668	11th	Gospels†, Acts†, General Epistles†, Pauline Epistles†	184	St. Panteleimon Monastery, 15	Mount Athos	Greece	INTF
1669	12th	Mark†, Luke†	89	St. Panteleimon Monastery, 16	Mount Athos	Greece	INTF
1670	14th	Gospels†	174	St. Panteleimon Monastery, 34	Mount Athos	Greece	INTF
1671	14th	Gospels	226	St. Panteleimon Monastery, 35	Mount Athos	Greece	INTF
1672	11th	Gospels †	220	St. Panteleimon Monastery, 36	Mount Athos	Greece	INTF
1672	11th	Gospels †	16	Vernadsky National Library, F. 310 (Samml. Nejin), 151	Kyiv	Ukraine	INTF
1673	12th	Luke† - Hebrews†	152	St. Panteleimon Monastery, 94	Mount Athos	Greece	INTF
1674	16th	Gospel of John^{P}	1	St. Panteleimon Monastery, 97a, Nr. 3	Mount Athos	Greece	INTF
1675	14th	Matthew† 2:5-28:20, Mark, Luke, John	225	St. Panteleimon Monastery, 101	Mount Athos	Greece	INTF
1676	1354	Gospels	224	St. Panteleimon Monastery, 176	Mount Athos	Greece	INTF
1677	13th	Theophylact Commentary on the Gospels†	390	St. Panteleimon Monastery, 271	Mount Athos	Greece	INTF
1678	14th	Theophylact and Zigabenus Commentary on the New Testament	334	St. Panteleimon Monastery, 770	Mount Athos	Greece	INTF
1679	15th	Gospels†	172	St. Panteleimon Monastery, 771	Mount Athos	Greece	INTF
1680	16th	Gospels	229	St. Panteleimon Monastery, 1061	Mount Athos	Greece	INTF
1681	12th	Matthew, Mark, Luke	?	Xenophontos Monastery, Ia' ?	Mount Athos	Greece	
1682	16th	Matthew, Mark, Luke	226	Vlatades Monastery, 58	Thessaloniki	Greece	INTF
1683	12th	Gospel of Luke	41	Vlatades Monastery, 82	Thessaloniki	Greece	INTF
1684	11th	Gospels	246	Center for Slavic and Byzantine Studies, 177	Sofia	Bulgaria	INTF
1685	13th	Gospels, Revelation	230	Byzantine and Christian Museum, 155	Athens	Greece	INTF
1685	13th	Gospels, Revelation	230	Byzantine and Christian Museum, 155	Athens	Greece	CSNTM
1686	1418	Gospels	344	National Library, 2603	Athens	Greece	CSNTM
1687	12th	Gospels	281	Byzantine and Christian Museum 156	Athens	Greece	INTF
1687	12th	Gospels	281	Byzantine and Christian Museum 156	Athens	Greece	CSNTM
1688	14th	Gospels	184	Byzantine and Christian Museum 157	Athens	Greece	INTF
1689	1200	Gospels	197	Academy of Sciences of the Czech Republic 1 TG 3	Prague	Czech Republic	INTF, CSNTM
1690	15th	Gospels	314	National Library, 2495	Athens	Greece	CSNTM
1691	11th	Gospels	265	National Library, 2507	Athens	Greece	CSNTM
1691	11th	Gospels	265	National Library, 2507	Athens	Greece	CSNTM (1)
1692	12th	Gospels	231	National Library, 2423	Athens	Greece	CSNTM
1692	12th	Gospels	231	National Library, 2423	Athens	Greece	INTF
1693	11th	Gospels	268	Princeton University Library, Scheide MS.1	Princeton	USA	INTF
1694	13th	Gospels	304	National Library, 2510	Athens	Greece	CSNTM
1695	1311	Gospels	248	National Library, 2499	Athens	Greece	CSNTM
1695	1311	Gospels	248	National Library, 2499	Athens	Greece	INTF
1696	12th	Gospels	257	Timiou Prodromou Monastery	Serres	Greece	
1696	12th	Gospels	1	Walters Art Museum, Ms. W. 530a	Baltimore, MD	USA	WAM
1697	13th	Gospels	234	National Library, 2509	Athens	Greece	CSNTM
1698	14th	Gospels†	238	National Library, 2508	Athens	Greece	CSNTM
1699	1359	Gospels	299	National Library, 2606	Athens	Greece	CSNTM
1700	1623	Gospels	231	National Library, 2408	Athens	Greece	CSNTM

[top]

== Minuscules 1701-1800 ==
#	Date	Contents	Pages	Institution and refs.	City, State	Country	Images
1701	10th/11th	Gospels†	265	Yale University Library, Beinecke MS 150	New Haven, CT	USA	YUL, INTF
1701	10th/11th	Gospels†	265	Yale University Library, Beinecke MS 150	New Haven, CT	USA	CSNTM
1702	1560	Gospels, Acts, General Epistles, Pauline Epistles	314	Konstamonitou Monastery, 6	Mount Athos	Greece	INTF
1703	14th	Gospels	187	Koutloumousiou Monastery, 279	Mount Athos	Greece	INTF
1704	1541	New Testament	490	Koutloumousiou Monastery, 356	Mount Athos	Greece	INTF
1705	1400	Gospels	239	State Archive, Kod. Br 38	Tirana	Albania	CSNTM
1706	13th-16th	Acts? General Epistles?	411	State Archive, Koder-Trapp 18	Tirana	Albania	
1707	14th	Theophylact Commentary on Gospel of John	603	State Archive, Kod. Br 12	Tirana	Albania	CSNTM
1708	?	Gospels	250	Owner Unknown			
1709	12th	John^{P}	54	State Archive, Kod. Br 19, fol. 141-194	Tirana	Albania	CSNTM, INTF
[1710]=1142							
1711	1416	Gospels	149	Owner Unknown			
1712	15th	Gospels†	105	Leimonos Monastery, Ms. Lesbiacus Leimonos 141	Lesbos	Greece	LM
1713	15th	Gospels	251	Leimonos Monastery, Ms. Lesbiacus Leimonos 145	Lesbos	Greece	LM
1714	12th	Matthew, Mark, Luke	136	Leimonos Monastery, Ms. Lesbiacus Leimonos 227	Lesbos	Greece	LM
1715	12th	Gospels†	225	Leimonos Monastery, Skeuophylakion 2	Lesbos	Greece	
1716	12th/13th	Gospels	293	High School	Mytilene, Lesbos	Greece	
1717	13th	Acts, General Epistles, Pauline epistles	301	Vatopedi Monastery, 850	Mount Athos	Greece	INTF
1718	12th	Acts, General Epistles, Pauline epistles	124	Vatopedi Monastery, 851	Mount Athos	Greece	INTF
1719	1287	Acts, General Epistles, Pauline Epistles, Revelation	212	Vatopedi Monastery, 852	Mount Athos	Greece	INTF
1720	10th	Acts, General Epistles, Pauline Epistles	353	Vatopedi Monastery, 853	Mount Athos	Greece	INTF
1721	17th	Acts, General Epistles, Pauline Epistles	550	Vatopedi Monastery, 863	Mount Athos	Greece	INTF
1722	13th	Acts, General Epistles, Pauline Epistles	239	Vatopedi Monastery, 864	Mount Athos	Greece	INTF
1723	14th	Acts†, General Epistles†, Pauline Epistles†	269	Vatopedi Monastery, 858	Mount Athos	Greece	INTF
1724	11th/12th	Acts†, General Epistles†, Pauline Epistles†	143	Vatopedi Monastery, 865	Mount Athos	Greece	INTF
1725	1367	Acts, General Epistles, Pauline Epistles	229	Vatopedi Monastery, 859	Mount Athos	Greece	INTF
1726	14th	Acts†, General Epistles†, Pauline Epistles†	223	Vatopedi Monastery, 860	Mount Athos	Greece	INTF
1727	13th	Acts, General Epistles, Pauline Epistles	240	Vatopedi Monastery, 861	Mount Athos	Greece	INTF
1728	13th	Acts†, General Epistles†, Pauline Epistles†, Revelation†	134	Vatopedi Monastery, 862	Mount Athos	Greece	INTF
1729	15th	Acts†, General Epistles^{P}†, Pauline Epistles^{P}†	209	Vatopedi Monastery, 968	Mount Athos	Greece	INTF
1730	11th	Acts†, General Epistles^{P}†, Pauline Epistles^{P}†	222	Vatopedi Monastery, 972	Mount Athos	Greece	INTF
1731	13th	Acts†, General Epistles†, Pauline Epistles†	153	Vatopedi Monastery, 973	Mount Athos	Greece	INTF
1732	1384	Acts, General Epistles, Pauline Epistles, Revelation	193	Great Lavra Monastery, A' 91	Mount Athos	Greece	INTF
1733	14th	Acts, General Epistles, Pauline Epistles, Revelation	303	Great Lavra Monastery, B' 5	Mount Athos	Greece	INTF
1734	1015	Acts†, General Epistles†, Pauline Epistles†, Revelation	233	Great Lavra Monastery, B' 18	Mount Athos	Greece	INTF
1735	10th	Acts, General Epistles†, Pauline Epistles†	189	Great Lavra Monastery, B' 42	Mount Athos	Greece	INTF
1736	13th	Acts, General Epistles, Pauline Epistles	237	Great Lavra Monastery, B' 45	Mount Athos	Greece	INTF
1737	12th	Acts, General Epistles, Pauline Epistles	271	Great Lavra Monastery, B' 56	Mount Athos	Greece	INTF
1738	11th	Acts†, General Epistles^{P}†, Pauline Epistles^{P}†	164	Great Lavra Monastery, B' 61	Mount Athos	Greece	INTF
1739	10th	Acts, General Epistles, Pauline Epistles	102	Great Lavra Monastery, B' 184	Mount Athos	Greece	INTF
1740	12th	Acts, General Epistles, Pauline Epistles, Revelation	307	Great Lavra Monastery, B' 80	Mount Athos	Greece	INTF
1741	14th	Acts†, General Epistles†, Pauline Epistles†	220	Great Lavra Monastery, G' 57	Mount Athos	Greece	INTF
1742	13th	Acts, General Epistles, Pauline epistles	259	Great Lavra Monastery, G' 75	Mount Athos	Greece	INTF
1743	12th	Acts, General Epistles, Pauline epistles	221	Great Lavra Monastery, G' 78	Mount Athos	Greece	INTF
1744	14th + 16th	Acts†, General Epistles†, Pauline epistles†	269	Great Lavra Monastery, W' 8	Mount Athos	Greece	INTF
1745	15th	Acts†, General Epistles†, Pauline Epistles†, Revelation	237	Great Lavra Monastery, W' 49	Mount Athos	Greece	INTF
1746	14th	Acts, General Epistles, Pauline Epistles, Revelation	248	Great Lavra Monastery, W' 114	Mount Athos	Greece	INTF
1747	14th	Acts†, General Epistles^{P}†, Pauline Epistles^{P}†	210	Great Lavra Monastery, W' 128	Mount Athos	Greece	INTF
1748	1662	Acts, General Epistles, Pauline epistles	234	Great Lavra Monastery, W' 131	Mount Athos	Greece	INTF
1749	16th	Acts, General Epistles, Pauline epistles	362	Great Lavra Monastery, W' 137	Mount Athos	Greece	INTF
1750	15th	Acts, General Epistles, Pauline epistles	298	Great Lavra Monastery, L' 118	Mount Athos	Greece	INTF
1751	1479	Acts, General Epistles, Pauline epistles	168	Great Lavra Monastery, K' 190, fol. 1-168	Mount Athos	Greece	INTF
1752	12th	Acts†, General Epistles†, Pauline Epistles†	306	St. Panteleimon Monastery, 24	Mount Athos	Greece	INTF
1753	14th	Acts, General Epistles, Pauline epistles	324	St. Panteleimon Monastery, 66	Mount Athos	Greece	INTF
1754	12th	Acts†, General Epistles†, Pauline Epistles†	239	St. Panteleimon Monastery, 68	Mount Athos	Greece	INTF
1755	11th	2 Timothy†, Titus, Philemon†	4	St. Panteleimon Monastery, 98,1	Mount Athos	Greece	INTF
1756	10th	Acts†, Pauline epistles^{P}†	25	St. Panteleimon Monastery, 99,1	Mount Athos	Greece	INTF
1757	15th	Acts†, General Epistles†, Pauline Epistles†, Revelation†	183	Leimonos Monastery, Ms. Lesbiacus Leimonos 132	Kalloni, Lesbos	Greece	LM
1757	15th	Acts†, General Epistles†, Pauline Epistles†, Revelation†	183	Leimonos Monastery, Ms. Lesbiacus Leimonos 132	Kalloni, Lesbos	Greece	INTF
1758	13th	Acts†, General Epistles†, Pauline Epistles†	205	Leimonos Monastery, Ms. Lesbiacus Leimonos 195	Kalloni, Lesbos	Greece	LM
1758	13th	Acts†, General Epistles†, Pauline Epistles†	205	Leimonos Monastery, Ms. Lesbiacus Leimonos 195	Kalloni, Lesbos	Greece	INTF
1759	13th	Acts†, General Epistles†, Pauline Epistles†	252	Vlatades Monastery, 68 (32)	Thessaloniki	Greece	INTF
1760	12th	Acts†, General Epistles†, Pauline Epistles†, Revelation†	381	Center for Slavic and Byzantine Studies, 176 (Serres, Prodromu, gæ 23)	Sofia	Bulgaria	INTF
1761	14th	Acts, General Epistles, Pauline Epistles	250	National Library 2521	Athens	Greece	CSNTM
1762	14th	Acts†, General Epistles†, Pauline Epistles^{P}†	175	National Library 2489	Athens	Greece	CSNTM
1763	15th	Acts†, General Epistles†, Pauline Epistles†	277	National Library 2450	Athens	Greece	CSNTM
1764	12th	Acts	99	National Archives of Albania Kod. Br. 17	Tirana	Albania	CSNTM, INTF
1765	14th	Acts, General Epistles, Pauline Epistles	252	British Library Add MS 33214	London	UK	BL
1765	14th	Acts, General Epistles, Pauline Epistles	252	British Library Add MS 33214	London	UK	INTF
1766	1344	Acts, General Epistles, Pauline Epistles	104	Center for Slavic and Byzantine Studies, 279 (Looted from Kosinitza Monastery in 1917)	Sofia	Bulgaria	INTF
1767	15th	Acts†, General Epistles†, Pauline Epistles†	237	Iviron Monastery, 642	Mount Athos	Greece	INTF
1768	1519	Acts, General Epistles, Pauline Epistles	249	Iviron Monastery, 643	Mount Athos	Greece	INTF
1769	14th	1 Corinthians† – Revelation†	209	Iviron Monastery, 648	Mount Athos	Greece	INTF
1770	11th	Pauline epistles^{P}†	93	Great Lavra Monastery, Γ' 63	Mount Athos	Greece	INTF
1771	14th	1 Corinthians† 14:36-15:58—Hebrews, Revelation	105	Great Lavra Monastery, E' 177	Mount Athos	Greece	INTF
1772	14th	2 Corinthians† – Hebrews†	141	Great Lavra Monastery, L' 172	Mount Athos	Greece	INTF
1773	14th	Revelation	188	Vatopedi Monastery, 17	Mount Athos	Greece	INTF
1774	15th	Revelation†	13	Great Lavra Monastery, Q' 187, fol. 1-13	Mount Athos	Greece	INTF
1775	1847	Revelation	275	St. Panteleimon Monastery, 110	Mount Athos	Greece	INTF
[1776]	1791	Revelation copied from printed edition.	410	St. Panteleimon Monastery, 71	Mount Athos	Greece	INTF
1777	19th	Revelation†	68	St. Panteleimon Monastery, 23	Mount Athos	Greece	INTF
1778	15th	Revelation† 1:9-22:21	177	Vlatades Monastery, 35	Thessaloniki	Greece	INTF
1779	1344	Gospels	134	Center for Slavic and Byzantine Studies, 217 (Looted from Kosinitza Monastery in 1917)	Sofia	Bulgaria	INTF
1780	c. 1200	Partial Theophylact Commentary New Testament	198	Duke University, KW Clark, Gk Ms 1	Durham, NC	USA	DU
1780	c. 1200	Partial Theophylact Commentary New Testament	198	Duke University, KW Clark, Gk Ms 1	Durham, NC	USA	INTF
1781	11th + 12th	Gospels	219	Center for Slavic and Byzantine Studies, 252 (Looted from Kosinitza Monastery in 1917)	Sofia	Bulgaria	INTF
1782	14th	Gospels	326	Owner unknown, (Looted from Kosinitza Monastery in 1917)			
1783	14th	Gospels	227	Center for Slavic and Byzantine Studies, 274 (Looted from Kosinitza Monastery in 1917)	Sofia	Bulgaria	INTF
1784	13th/14th	Gospels	245	Center for Slavic and Byzantine Studies, 328 (Looted from Kosinitza Monastery in 1917)	Sofia	Bulgaria	INTF
1785	13th/14th	New Testament	388	Owner unknown, (Looted from Kosinitza Monastery in 1917)			
1786	15th	Gospels	331	Center for Slavic and Byzantine Studies, 365 (Looted from Kosinitza Monastery in 1917)	Sofia	Bulgaria	INTF
1787	11th/12th	Gospels	129	Center for Slavic and Byzantine Studies, 59 (Looted from Kosinitza Monastery in 1917)	Sofia	Bulgaria	INTF
1788	14th/15th	Gospels	295	Center for Slavic and Byzantine Studies, 289	Sofia	Bulgaria	INTF
1789	13th/14th	Gospels	271	Center for Slavic and Byzantine Studies, 227 (Looted from Kosinitza Monastery in 1917)	Sofia	Bulgaria	INTF
1790	13th/14th	Gospels	211	Center for Slavic and Byzantine Studies, 281 (Looted from Kosinitza Monastery in 1917)	Sofia	Bulgaria	INTF
1791	14th	Gospels	425	Center for Slavic and Byzantine Studies, 260 (Looted from Kosinitza Monastery in 1917)	Sofia	Bulgaria	INTF
1792	13th	Gospels	285	Center for Slavic and Byzantine Studies, 251 (Looted from Kosinitza Monastery in 1917)	Sofia	Bulgaria	INTF
[1793]=2856							
1794	13th	Gospels	310	Center for Slavic and Byzantine Studies, 351 (Looted from Kosinitza Monastery in 1917)	Sofia	Bulgaria	INTF
[1795]=905							
[1796]							
1797	1226	Gospels	175	Gennadius Library, Ms. 1.5	Athens	Greece	CSNTM, INTF
1798	12th	Theophylact Commentary on the Pauline epistles	337	Franzoniana Library, 24	Genoa	Italy	INTF
1799	12th/13th	Acts†, General Epistles†, Pauline Epistles†	133	Firestone Library, Garrett 8	Princeton, NJ	USA	Firestone Library
1800	12th	Gospels†	183	National Library of Russia, Gr. 183	Saint Petersburg	Russia	INTF

[top]

== Minuscules 1801-1900 ==
#	Date	Contents	Pages	Institution and refs.	City, State	Country	Images
1801	11th	Gospels†	248	Owner unknown, formerly: Trapezunt, Sumela 1			
1802 = 2335	1668	Gospels	438	Archaeological Museum, 7	Ankara	Turkey	INTF
1803	12th	Gospels†	304	Archaeological Museum, 470, 1	Ankara	Turkey	INTF
1804	12th	Gospels†	336	Archaeological Museum, 470, 5	Ankara	Turkey	INTF
1805	12th	Gospels	188	Owner unknown, formerly: Trapezunt, Sumela, 21			
1806	14th	Revelation	44	Owner unknown, formerly: Trapezunt, Sumela 41			
1807	12th	Gospels	194	Gennadius Library, 259	Athens	Greece	CSNTM, INTF
1808	13th	Gospels	213	Museum Hagia Sophia, 11664	Istanbul	Turkey	INTF
1809	14th	Acts†, General Epistles†, Pauline Epistles†	117	Owner unknown, formerly: Trapezunt, Sumela, 56			
1810	11th	Gospels	324	Owner unknown, formerly: Trapezunt, Sumela 61			
1811	11th	Gospels†	266	Owner unknown, formerly: Trapezunt, Sumela 74			
1812	11th	Gospels	219	Byzantine and Christian Museum, 147a	Athens	Greece	
1813	12th	Gospels	235	Duke University, Gk MS 25	Durham, NC	USA	DU
1813	12th	Gospels	235	Duke University, Gk MS 25	Durham, NC	USA	INTF
1814	15th	Gospels†	487	Braidense National Library, AF. XIV. 15	Milan	Italy	INTF
[1815] = 2127							
1816	10th	Gospels	202	Queriniana Library, A. VI. 26	Brescia	Italy	INTF
1817	11th	Chrysostom Commentary on Galatians through Colossians	283	Vatican Library, Vat.gr.551	Vatican City	Vatican City	INTF
1818	12th	Chrysostom Commentary on Hebrews	155	Vatican Library, Vat.gr.552	Vatican City	Vatican City	DVL, INTF
1819	15th	Cyril Commentary on John†	355	Vatican Library, Vat.gr.592	Vatican City	Vatican City	INTF
1820	15th	Cyril Commentary on John	296	Vatican Library, Vat.gr.593	Vatican City	Vatican City	INTF
1821	1117	Luke (Nicetas Catena)	320	Vatican Library, Vat.gr.1611	Vatican City	Vatican City	DVL
1821	1117	Luke (Nicetas Catena)	320	Vatican Library, Vat.gr.1611	Vatican City	Vatican City	INTF
1822	12th	Luke (Nicetas Catena)	295	Vatican Library, Vat.gr.1642	Vatican City	Vatican City	DVL, INTF
1823	15th	Gospel of Matthew† 2:6-28:20, Mark, Luke, John	366	Vatican Library, Vat.gr.2316	Vatican City	Vatican City	INTF
1824	17th	Revelation^{K}	184	The Vatican Library, Ott.gr.126, fol. 544-642; Ott.gr.127, fol. 1-85	Vatican City	Vatican City	DVL,
1824	17th	Revelation^{K}	184	The Vatican Library, Ott.gr.126, fol. 544-642; Ott.gr.127, fol. 1-85	Vatican City	Vatican City	INTF
[1825]							
1826	12th	Matthew† 20:19-26:59, Luke^{P} 22:43-45, John^{P} 13:3-17	24	Lutheran School of Theology at Chicago, Gruber 122	Maywood, IL	USA	CSNTM
1826	12th	Matthew† 26:59-28:20, Mark 1:1-16:6†	57	Russian National Academy of Sciences Library, K'pel 79	Saint Petersburg	Russia	INTF
1827	1295	Acts† 1:16-28:31, General Epistles, Pauline Epistles†	195	National Library, 131	Athens	Greece	CSNTM
1827	1295	Acts† 1:16-28:31, General Epistles, Pauline Epistles†	195	National Library, 131	Athens	Greece	INTF
1828	11th	Acts, General Epistles, Pauline Epistles, Revelation 1:1-18:22†	327	National Library, 91	Athens	Greece	CSNTM
1828	11th	Acts, General Epistles, Pauline Epistles, Revelation 1:1-18:22†	327	National Library, 91	Athens	Greece	INTF
1829	10th	Acts^{S}†, General Epistles	86	National Library, 105	Athens	Greece	CSNTM
1829	10th	Acts^{S}†, General Epistles	86	National Library, 105	Athens	Greece	INTF
1830	15th	Acts, General Epistles, Pauline Epistles	224	National Library, 129	Athens	Greece	CSNTM
1830	15th	Acts, General Epistles, Pauline Epistles	224	National Library, 129	Athens	Greece	INTF
1831	14th	Acts, General Epistles†, Pauline Epistles†	356	National Library, 119	Athens	Greece	CSNTM
1831	14th	Acts, General Epistles†, Pauline Epistles†	356	National Library, 119	Athens	Greece	INTF
1832	14th	Acts† 7:35-28:31, General Epistles†, Pauline Epistles†	220	National Library, 89	Athens	Greece	CSNTM
1832	14th	Acts† 7:35-28:31, General Epistles†, Pauline Epistles†	220	National Library, 89	Athens	Greece	INTF
[1833]	1580	Acts		Burnt. Formerly: Zakynthos, Stadtbibl., Katrames 10			
1834	1301	Acts, Pauline epistles, General Epistles	327	National Library of Russia, Gr. 225	Saint Petersburg	Russia	
1835	11th	Revelation†	30	Royal Site of San Lorenzo de El Escorial, T. III. 17, fol. 159-174.177-189	San Lorenzo de El Escorial	Spain	INTF
1835	11th	Acts†, General Epistles†	63	National Library, 4588	Madrid	Spain	BDH
1836	10th	1 John^{P}† - 2 Thessalonians^{P}†	139	Exarchist Monastery of Saint Mary, A. b. 1	Grottaferrata	Italy	INTF
1837	10th	Acts, General Epistles, Pauline Epistles	181	Exarchist Monastery of Saint Mary, A. b. 3	Grottaferrata	Italy	INTF
1838	11th	Acts, General Epistles, Pauline Epistles†	193	Exarchist Monastery of Saint Mary, A. b. 6	Grottaferrata	Italy	INTF
1839	13th	Commentary on Acts†, General Epistles†, Pauline Epistles†	224	University Library, 40	Messina	Italy	INTF
1840	16th	Zigabenus Commentary on General Epistles, Pauline Epistles	456	Casanata Library, 1395	Rome	Italy	INTF
1841	9th/10th	Acts†, General Epistles†, Pauline Epistles†, Revelation†	204	Leimonos Monastery, Ms. Lesbiacus Leimonos 55	Kalloni, Lesbos	Greece	LM
1841	9th/10th	Acts†, General Epistles†, Pauline Epistles†, Revelation†	204	Leimonos Monastery, Ms. Lesbiacus Leimonos 55	Kalloni, Lesbos	Greece	INTF
1842	13th/14th	Acts, General Epistles	105	Vatican Library, Vat.gr.652	Vatican City	Vatican City	DVL, INTF
1843	13th	Acts, General Epistles, Pauline Epistles	398	Vatican Library, Vat.gr.1208	Vatican City	Vatican City	DVL
1843	13th	Acts, General Epistles, Pauline Epistles	398	Vatican Library, Vat.gr.1208	Vatican City	Vatican City	INTF
1844	16th	1 John - Jude	50	Vatican Library, Vat.gr.1227, fol. 256-305	Vatican City	Vatican City	INTF
1845	10th	Acts, General Epistles, Pauline Epistles	247	Vatican Library, Vat.gr.1971	Vatican City	Vatican City	DVL, INTF
1846	11th	Acts†, General Epistles†, Pauline Epistles†	125	Vatican Library, Vat.gr.2099	Vatican City	Vatican City	INTF
1847	11th	Acts, General Epistles, Pauline Epistles	351	Vatican Library, Pal.gr.38	Vatican City	Vatican City	HU
1847	11th	Acts, General Epistles, Pauline Epistles	351	Vatican Library, Pal.gr.38	Vatican City	Vatican City	INTF
1848	15th	Acts, General Epistles, Pauline Epistles^{P}	268	National Library, Grec 108, Grec 109, Grec 110, Grec 111	Paris	France	BnF, INTF
1848	15th	Acts, General Epistles, Pauline Epistles^{P}	39	Vatican Library, Reg.gr.76	Vatican City	Vatican City	INTF
1849	1069	Acts, General Epistles, Pauline Epistles, Revelation	286	Marciana National Library, Gr. II,114 (1107)	Venice	Italy	INTF
1850	12th	Acts, General Epistles, Pauline Epistles	147	Cambridge University Library, Add. Mss. 6678	Cambridge	UK	INTF
1851	10th	Acts†, General Epistles†, Pauline Epistles†	229	Linköping Diocesan Library, T. 14	Linköping	Sweden	LDL
1851	10th	Acts†, General Epistles†, Pauline Epistles†	229	Linköping Diocesan Library, T. 14	Linköping	Sweden	INTF
1852	13th	Acts† 9:33-28:31, General Epistles†, Pauline Epistles†, Revelation	182	Uppsala University, Gr. 11	Uppsala	Sweden	UU
1852	13th	Acts† 9:33-28:31, General Epistles†, Pauline Epistles†, Revelation	182	Uppsala University, Gr. 11	Uppsala	Sweden	INTF
1853	12th	Acts, General Epistles, Pauline Epistles	227	Esphigmenou Monastery, 68	Mount Athos	Greece	INTF
1854	11th	Acts, General Epistles, Pauline Epistles, Revelation	319	Iviron Monastery, 25	Mount Athos	Greece	INTF
1855	13th	Acts, General Epistles, Pauline Epistles	209	Iviron Monastery,37	Mount Athos	Greece	INTF
1856	14th	Acts†, General Epistles†, Pauline Epistles†	180	Iviron Monastery,57	Mount Athos	Greece	INTF
1857	13th	Acts, General Epistles, Pauline Epistles, Revelation	198	Iviron Monastery, 60, fol. 1-198	Mount Athos	Greece	INTF
1858	13th	Acts†, General Epistles†, Pauline Epistles†	152	Konstamonitou Monastery, 108	Mount Athos	Greece	INTF
1858	13th	Acts†, General Epistles†, Pauline Epistles†	16	Library of the Russian Academy of Sciences, Dmitr. 33	Saint Petersburg	Russia	INTF
1859	14th	Acts, General Epistles, Revelation (no commentary)	145	Koutloumousiou Monastery, 82	Mount Athos	Greece	INTF
1860	13th	Acts, General Epistles, Pauline Epistles	329	Koutloumousiou Monastery, 83	Mount Athos	Greece	INTF
1861	16th	Acts†, General Epistles†, Pauline Epistles†	206	Koutloumousiou Monastery, 275	Mount Athos	Greece	INTF
1862	9th/10th/11th	Acts, General Epistles, Pauline Epistles, Revelation	429	Agiou Pavlou Monastery, 2	Mount Athos	Greece	INTF
1862	9th/10th/11th	Acts, General Epistles, Pauline Epistles, Revelation	429	Agiou Pavlou Monastery, 2	Mount Athos	Greece	Elpenor
1863	12th	Acts, General Epistles, Pauline Epistles	205	Church of Protaton, 32	Mount Athos	Greece	INTF
1864	13th	Acts, General Epistles, Pauline Epistles, Revelation	144	Stavronikita Monastery, 52	Mount Athos	Greece	MAR
1865	13th	Acts, General Epistles, Pauline Epistles, Revelation	315	Philotheu Monastery, 38	Mount Athos	Greece	INTF
[1866] = ℓ 1591							
1867	12th	Acts†, General Epistles†, Pauline Epistles†	207	Griechisches Patriarchat, 117 (5)	Alexandria	Egypt	INTF
1868	12th	Acts, General Epistles, Pauline Epistles	289	Ecumenical Patriarchate, Triados 14 (16)	Istanbul	Turkey	INTF
1868	12th	Acts, General Epistles, Pauline Epistles	289	Ecumenical Patriarchate, Triados 14 (16)	Istanbul	Turkey	CSNTM
1869	1688	Acts, General Epistles, Pauline Epistles	191	Ecumenical Patriarchate, Theo. School of Chalki 9	Istanbul	Turkey	INTF
1869	1688	Acts, General Epistles, Pauline Epistles	191	Ecumenical Patriarchate, Theo. School of Chalki 9	Istanbul	Turkey	CSNTM
1870	11th	Acts, General Epistles, Revelation	298	Ecumenical Patriarchate, Theo. School of Chalki 9	Istanbul	Turkey	INTF
1870	11th	Acts, General Epistles, Revelation	298	Ecumenical Patriarchate, Theo. School of Chalki 9	Istanbul	Turkey	CSNTM
1871	10th	Acts† (no commentary), General Epistles†	215	Ecumenical Patriarchate, Theo. School of Chalki 9	Istanbul	Turkey	INTF
1871	10th	Acts† (no commentary), General Epistles†	215	Ecumenical Patriarchate, Theo. School of Chalki 9	Istanbul	Turkey	CSNTM
1872	12th	Acts, General Epistles, Revelation	233	Ecumenical Patriarchate, Theo. School of Chalki 9	Istanbul	Turkey	INTF
1872	12th	Acts, General Epistles, Revelation	233	Ecumenical Patriarchate, Theo. School of Chalki 9	Istanbul	Turkey	CSNTM
1873	13th	Acts, General Epistles, Pauline Epistles	379	Gennadius Library, MS 1.8	Athens	Greece	CSNTM, INTF
1874	10th	Acts, General Epistles, Pauline Epistles	191	Saint Catherine's Monastery, 273	Sinai	Egypt	INTF
1875	10th	Acts, General Epistles, Pauline Epistles†	181	National Library, 149	Athens	Greece	CSNTM
1875	10th	Acts, General Epistles, Pauline Epistles†	181	National Library, 149	Athens	Greece	INTF
1876	15th	Acts, General Epistles, Pauline Epistles, Revelation 1:1-21:27†	276	Saint Catherine's Monastery, Gr. 279	Sinai	Egypt	LOC, INTF, CSNTM
1877	14th	Acts, General Epistles, Pauline Epistles	321	Saint Catherine's Monastery, Gr. 280	Sinai	Egypt	LOC, INTF, CSNTM
1878	11th	Romans - 2 Corinthians	298	Saint Catherine's Monastery, Gr. 281	Sinai	Egypt	LOC, INTF, CSNTM
1879	11th	Galatians - Hebrews	357	Saint Catherine's Monastery, Gr. 282	Sinai	Egypt	LOC, INTF, CSNTM
1880	10th	Acts, General Epistles, Pauline Epistles†	241	Saint Catherine's Monastery, Gr. 283	Sinai	Egypt	LOC, INTF, CSNTM
1881	14th	Romans† - Hebrews†, 1 Peter† - Jude	126	Saint Catherine's Monastery, Gr. 300	Sinai	Egypt	LOC, INTF, CSNTM
1882	15th	Romans - Philemon, General Epistles	132	Sainte-Geneviève Library, 3399	Paris	France	INTF
1883	16th	Acts	97	Marciana National Library, Gr. II,61 (955), fol. 200-296	Venice	Italy	INTF
1884	16th	Acts	121	Gotha Research Library, Chart. B 1767	Gotha	Germany	INTF
1885	1101	Acts, General Epistles (no commentary), Pauline Epistles	396	National Library, Supplement Grec 1262	Paris	France	BnF, INTF
1885	1101	Acts, General Epistles (no commentary), Pauline Epistles	3	Russian National Library, Gr. 321	Saint Petersburg	Russia	
1886	14th	Acts, General Epistles, Pauline Epistles	292	National Library, Supplement Grec 1263	Paris	France	BnF, INTF
1887	12th	Acts	?	Panagia Hozoviotissa Monastery, 5?	Amorgos	Greece	
1888	11th	Acts, General Epistles, Pauline Epistles, Revelation	280	Patriarchate of Jerusalem, Taphos, 38	Jerusalem		LOC, INTF, CSNTM
1889	12th	Acts†, General Epistles†, Pauline Epistles†	140	Patriarchate of Jerusalem, Taphos, 43	Jerusalem		LOC, INTF, CSNTM
1890	14th	Acts†, General Epistles†, Pauline Epistles†	268	Patriarchate of Jerusalem, Taphos 462	Jerusalem		LOC, INTF, CSNTM
1891	10th	Acts, General Epistles, Pauline Epistles	233	Patriarchate of Jerusalem, Sabas, 107	Jerusalem		LOC, INTF, CSNTM
1892	14th	Acts, General Epistles, Pauline Epistles	280	Patriarchate of Jerusalem, Sabas, 204	Jerusalem		LOC, INTF, CSNTM
1893	12th	Acts†, General Epistles†, Pauline Epistles†, Revelation†	166	Patriarchate of Jerusalem, Sabas, 665	Jerusalem		LOC, INTF, CSNTM
1894	12th	Acts†, General Epistles, Pauline Epistles†	263	Patriarchate of Jerusalem, Sabas 676	Jerusalem		LOC, INTF, CSNTM
1895	9th	Acts†	349	Patriarchate of Jerusalem, Stavros 25	Jerusalem		LOC, INTF, CSNTM
1896	14th/15th	Acts, Pauline Epistles (without Galatians)†	274	Patriarchate of Jerusalem, Stavros 37	Jerusalem		LOC, INTF, CSNTM
1897	12th/13th	Acts, Pauline Epistles	186	Patriarchate of Jerusalem, Stavros 57	Jerusalem		LOC, INTF, CSNTM
[1898] = 1875							
1899	14th	Acts†, Pauline Epistles†	112	Monastery of Saint John the Theologian, 664	Patmos	Greece	INTF
1900	9th	Pauline Epistles†	270	Pantokratoros Monastery, 28	Mount Athos	Greece	INTF

[top]

== Minuscules 1901-2000 ==
#	Date	Contents	Pages	Institution and refs.	City, State	Country	Images
1901	1524	Gospels	296	Monastery of Saint John the Theologian, 635	Patmos	Greece	INTF
1902	14th	Acts†, Pauline Epistles†	297	Esphigmenou Monastery, 198	Mount Athos	Greece	INTF
1903	1636	Acts, Pauline Epistles, Revelation	250	Xeropotamou Monastery, 243	Mount Athos	Greece	INTF
1904	11th	Acts†, Pauline Epistles^{P}†,	35	Koutloumousiou Monastery, 86	Mount Athos	Greece	INTF
1905	10th	Pauline Epistles†	251	National Library, Coislin 27	Paris	France	INTF
1906	1056	Pauline Epistles	272	National Library, Coislin 28	Paris	France	INTF
1907	11th	Pauline epistles†	169	Cambridge University Library, Ff. 1.30	Cambridge	UK	INTF
1907	11th	Pauline epistles†	170	Magdalen College, Gr. 7	Oxford	UK	DB
1907	11th	Pauline epistles†	170	Magdalen College, Gr. 7	Oxford	UK	INTF
1908	11th	Pauline epistles	255	Bodleian Library, Roe 16	Oxford	UK	INTF
1909	12th	Romans 7:7 - 16:24 (Nicetas Catena)	359	Bavarian State Library, Cod.graec. 412	Munich	Germany	BSB, INTF
[1909^{abs}]= 2888							
1910	11th/12th	Galatians - Hebrews	312	National Library, Coislin 204	Paris	France	INTF
1911	16th	Pauline epistles	233	British Library, Harley MS 5552	London	UK	BL
1911	16th	Pauline epistles	233	British Library, Harley MS 5552	London	UK	INTF
1912	10th	Pauline Epistles (without Titus and Philemon)	170	Victor Emmanuel III National Library, Cod. Neapol. ex Vind. 8	Naples	Italy	INTF
1913	13th	Theophylact Commentary on the Pauline epistles†	85	Leipzig University Library, Cod. Gr. 16, fol. 1-85	Leipzig	Germany	INTF
1914	12th	Pauline epistles	266	Vatican Library, Vat.gr.761	Vatican City	Vatican	INTF
1915	10th	Romans, 1 Corinthians, 2 Corinthians	411	Vatican Library, Vat.gr.762	Vatican City	Vatican	INTF
1916	11th	Pauline epistles	177	Vatican Library, Vat.gr.765	Vatican City	Vatican	INTF
1917	12th	Pauline epistles	249	Vatican Library, Vat.gr.766	Vatican City	Vatican	INTF
1918	14th	Romans - 1 Timothy†, Revelation†	60	Vatican Library, Vat.gr.1136	Vatican City	Vatican	INTF
1918	14th	Romans - 1 Timothy†, Revelation†	4	Vatican Library, Vat.gr.1882	Vatican City	Vatican	DVL
1919	11th	Pauline Epistles	426	Laurentian Library, Plut.10.04	Florence	Italy	BML, INTF
1920	10th	Pauline Epistles	285	Laurentian Library, Plut.10.06	Florence	Italy	BML, INTF
1921	11th	Pauline Epistles	270	Laurentian Library, Plut.10.07	Florence	Italy	BML, INTF
1922	13th	Pauline Epistles	260	Laurentian Library, Plut.10.19	Florence	Italy	BML, INTF
1923	11th	Pauline Epistles	369	Marciana National Library, Gr. Z. 33 (423)	Venice	Italy	INTF
1924	11th	Pauline Epistles	332	Marciana National Library, Gr. Z. 34 (349)	Venice	Italy	INTF
1925	11th	2 Corinthians - Hebrews	159	Marciana National Library, Gr. Z. 35 (343)	Venice	Italy	INTF
1926	12th	Theophylact Commentary on 1 Corinthians, 2 Corinthians	462	State Historical Museum, V. 97, S. 305	Moscow	Russia	INTF
1927	10th	Pauline Epistles	241	State Historical Museum, V. 94, S. 98	Moscow	Russia	INTF
1928	15th	Theophylact Commentary on Romans†	41	State Historical Museum, V. 418, S. 363, fol. 117-157	Moscow	Russia	INTF
1929	1387	Theophylact Commentary on the Pauline Epistles†	381	Bavarian State Library, Cod.graec. 504	Munich	Germany	BSB, CSNTM, INTF
[1929^{abs}]= 2889							
1930	16th	Theophylact Commentary on the Pauline Epistles	488	Bavarian State Library, Cod.graec. 35	Munich	Germany	INTF
1931	16th	Pauline Epistles	168	National Library, Grec 126	Paris	France	INTF
1932	11th	Pauline Epistles†	227	National Library, Grec 222	Paris	France	BnF, INTF
1933	1045	Pauline Epistles	273	National Library, Grec 223	Paris	France	BnF, INTF
1934	11th	Pauline Epistles, Revelation	274	National Library, Grec 224	Paris	France	BnF, INTF
1935	16th	Theophylact Commentary on Romans - 2 Thessalonians	401	National Library, Grec 225	Paris	France	BnF, INTF
1936	16th	Chrysostom Commentary on Romans 1:1 - 6:11	96	National Library, Grec 226	Paris	France	BnF
1937	16th	1 Corinthians	213	National Library, Grec 227	Paris	France	BnF, INTF
1938	13th	Hebrews (Nicetas Catena)	391	National Library, Grec 238	Paris	France	BnF, INTF
1939	16th	Theodoret Commentary on the Pauline Epistles	261	National Library, Grec 849	Paris	France	BnF, INTF
1940	16th	1 Thessalonians - Hebrews	71	Formerly, Turin National University Library, C.VI.29 (destroyed)	Turin	Italy	
1941	13th	Pauline Epistles†	241	Ambrosiana Library, B 6 inf.	Milan	Italy	INTF
1942	12th	Chrysostom Commentary on Romans - 1 Thessalonians†	175	Ambrosiana Library, A 51 /b sup.	Milan	Italy	INTF
1943	14th	Theophylact Commentary on the Pauline Epistles	341	Ambrosiana Library, F 125 sup.	Milan	Italy	INTF
[1944] = 2288							
1945	13th	Theodoret Commentary on the Pauline Epistles	137	Vatican Library, Vat.gr.1649	Vatican City	Vatican	INTF
1946	11th	1 Corinthians - Hebrews†	181	Vatican Library, Ott.gr.31	Vatican City	Vatican	DVL
1946	11th	1 Corinthians - Hebrews†	181	Vatican Library, Ott.gr.31	Vatican City	Vatican	INTF
1947	15th	Theophylact Commentary on the Pauline Epistles†	198	Vatican Library, Ott.gr.61	Vatican City	Vatican	DVL
1947	15th	Theophylact Commentary on the Pauline Epistles†	198	Vatican Library, Ott.gr.61	Vatican City	Vatican	INTF
1948	15th	Pauline Epistles, Revelation	187	Vatican Library, Ott.gr.176	Vatican City	Vatican	DVL
1948	15th	Pauline Epistles, Revelation	187	Vatican Library, Ott.gr.176	Vatican City	Vatican	INTF
1949	15th	Romans 1:1 - 9:1	144	Vatican Library, Ott.gr.356	Vatican City	Vatican	DVL
1949	15th	Romans 1:1 - 9:1	144	Vatican Library, Ott.gr.356	Vatican City	Vatican	INTF
1950	14th	Theophylact Commentary on the Pauline Epistles†	279	Vatican Library, Chig.R.V.32	Vatican City	Vatican	INTF
1951	12th	Pauline Epistles	158	Vatican Library, Chig.R.VIII.55	Vatican City	Vatican	INTF
1952	14th	Pauline Epistles	267	Vatican Library, Barb.gr.503	Vatican City	Vatican	INTF
1953	13th	Romans 1:1 - 1 Corinthians 1:12	70	Austrian National Library, Theol. gr. 166, fol. 1-70	Vienna	Austria	INTF
1954	10th	Pauline Epistles^{P}	62	Central Library, I. E. 11	Palermo	Italy	INTF
1955	11th	Pauline Epistles, Revelation†	144	Lambeth Palace, MS1186	London	UK	INTF
1956	13th	Pauline Epistles	198	British Library, Add MS 7142	London	UK	BL
1956	13th	Pauline Epistles	198	British Library, Add MS 7142	London	UK	INTF
1957	15th	Hebrews 9:14-13:25, Revelation	9	Vatican Library, Vat.gr.1209	Vatican City	Vatican	DVL, INTF
1958	15th	Pauline Epistles	171	Biblioteca Riccardiana, 85	Florence	Italy	INTF
1959	15th	Pauline Epistles	157	Leiden University Library, B. P. Gr. 66	Leiden	Netherlands	INTF
1960	14th	Pauline Epistles	103	Drew University, MS 1	Madison, NJ	USA	CSNTM
1961	14th	Theophylact Commentary on the Pauline Epistles	418	British Library, Arundel MS 534	London	UK	BL
1961	14th	Theophylact Commentary on the Pauline Epistles	418	British Library, Arundel MS 534	London	UK	INTF
1962	11th/12th	Chrysostom Commentary on the Pauline Epistles†	227	Austrian National Library, Theol. gr. 157	Vienna	Austria	INTF
1963	16th	Theodoret Commentary on the Pauline Epistles	262	Library of Study and Conservation, Ms. 169	Besançon	France	INTF
1964	15th	Theophylact Commentary on Romans 1:11 - 5:18; 7:5 - 16:27; 1 Corinthians 1:1-23; Hebrews	262	National Library, Grec 224 A	Paris	France	INTF
1965	14th	Theophylact Commentary on Romans 16:2-13; Colossians 1:1-4; 2 Timothy 2:19-4:22; Hebrews 1:1-2	11	National Library, Supplement Grec 1001, fol. 3.3a-12	Paris	France	INTF
1966	13th	Gospels	271	Monastery of Saint John the Theologian, 87	Patmos	Greece	INTF
1967	15th	Theodoret Commentary on Romans 1:1 - 2:26	14th	Vatican Library, Ott.gr.74, fol. 267-280	Vatican City	Vatican	DVL
1968	11th	Colossians; 1 Thessalonians	2	Vatican Library, Pal.gr.423, fol. 7.8	Vatican City	Vatican	INTF
1969	13th	Chrysostom Commentary on the Pauline Epistles	357	National Library, Coislin 29	Paris	France	INTF
1970	12th	Pauline Epistles†	177	National Library, Coislin 30	Paris	France	INTF
1971	12th	Pauline Epistles	348	National Library, Coislin 95	Paris	France	INTF
1972	13th	Pauline Epistles	227	National Library, Coislin 217	Paris	France	BnF, INTF
1973	13th	Theophylact Commentary on the Pauline Epistles	319	National Library, NLG 96	Athens	Greece	CSNTM
1974	12th	Romans - 2 Thessalonians†	152	Royal Site of San Lorenzo de El Escorial, X. IV. 15	San Lorenzo de El Escorial	Spain	INTF
1975	14th	Ephesians^{K}† 5:8 - 1 Thessalonians^{K} 2:16†	19	University Library, 2378	Bologna	Italy	INTF
1976	13th	Theophylact Commentary on Philippians† - Hebrews†	143	Laurentian Library, Plut.06.08	Florence	Italy	BML, INTF
1977	14th	Theophylact Commentary on the Pauline Epistles†	602	Laurentian Library, Plut.10.09	Florence	Italy	BML, INTF
1978	15th	Theophylact Commentary on the Pauline Epistles	529	Laurentian Library, Plut.11.07	Florence	Italy	BML, INTF
1979	16th	Theophylact Commentary on the Pauline Epistles	136	Laurentian Library, Conv.Soppr.21	Florence	Italy	BML, CSNTM, INTF
1980	11th	Pauline Epistles† (Portions of NT text abridged)	316	Ambrosiana Library, A 62 inf.	Milan	Italy	INTF
1981	11th	Pauline Epistles†	190	Ambrosiana Library, C 295 inf.	Milan	Italy	INTF
1982	11th	Pauline Epistles†	323	Ambrosiana Library, D 541 inf.	Milan	Italy	INTF
1983	13th	Hebrews (Nicetas Catena)	268	Ambrosiana Library, E 2 inf.	Milan	Italy	INTF
[1983^{abs}] = 2890							
1984	14th	Theophylact Commentary on the Pauline Epistles	436	Victor Emmanuel III National Library, Ms. II. B. 23	Naples	Italy	INTF
1985	16th	Theophylact Commentary on the Pauline Epistles	562	Victor Emmanuel III National Library, Ms. II. B. 24, fol. 354-925	Naples	Italy	INTF
1986	12th	Pauline Epistles†	189	Vatican Library, Barb.gr.574	Vatican City	Vatican	INTF
1987	14th	Theophylact Commentary on the Pauline Epistles†	531	Casanata Library, 1298	Rome	Italy	INTF
1988	12th	Theophylact Commentary on Romans-Ephesians†	380	Vatican Library, Vat.gr.549	Vatican City	Vatican	INTF
[1989]							
[1990]							
1991	13th	Theophylact Commentary on the Pauline Epistles	204	Vatican Library, Vat.gr.646	Vatican City	Vatican	INTF
1992	1232	Theophylact Commentary on the Pauline Epistles	338	Vatican Library, Vat.gr.648	Vatican City	Vatican	INTF
1993	11th	1 Corinthians-Ephesians†	93	Vatican Library, Vat.gr.692	Vatican City	Vatican	INTF
1994	16th	Theophylact Commentary on Romans, 1 Corinthians, 2 Corinthians, Ephesians, 1 Timothy, 2 Timothy, Hebrews	437	Vatican Library, Vat.gr.1222	Vatican City	Vatican	INTF
1995	15th	Theophylact Commentary on the Pauline Epistles†	294	Vatican Library, Vat.gr.2180	Vatican City	Vatican	INTF
1996	15th	Theodoret Commentary on the Pauline Epistles	294	Vatican Library, Ott.gr.17	Vatican City	Vatican	INTF
1997	10th	Pauline Epistles†	268	Vatican Library, Pal.gr.10	Vatican City	Vatican	HU
1997	10th	Pauline Epistles†	268	Vatican Library, Pal.gr.10	Vatican City	Vatican	INTF
1998	10th	Pauline Epistles	181	Vatican Library, Vat.gr.204	Vatican City	Vatican	DVL
1998	10th	Pauline Epistles	181	Vatican Library, Vat.gr.204	Vatican City	Vatican	INTF
1999	14th	Theodoret Commentary on the Pauline Epistles	196	Marciana National Library, Gr. Z. 36 (350)	Venice	Italy	INTF
2000	14th	Theophylact Commentary on the Pauline Epistles	360	Koutloumousiou Monastery, 129s	Mount Athos	Greece	INTF

[top]

== See also ==
- List of New Testament papyri
- List of New Testament uncials
- List of New Testament minuscules (1–1000)
- List of New Testament minuscules (2001–)
- List of New Testament minuscules ordered by Location/Institution
- List of New Testament lectionaries
- List of New Testament amulets

=== Lists of minuscules (1001–2000) ===
- List of New Testament minuscules (1001–1100)
- List of New Testament minuscules (1101–1200)
- List of New Testament minuscules (1201–1300)
- List of New Testament minuscules (1301–1400)
- List of New Testament minuscules (1401–1500)
- List of New Testament minuscules (1501–1600)
- List of New Testament minuscules (1601–1700)
- List of New Testament minuscules (1701–1800)
- List of New Testament minuscules (1801–1900)
- List of New Testament minuscules (1901–2000)

== Bibliography ==
- Aland, Kurt; M. Welte; B. Köster; K. Junack (1994). Kurzgefasste Liste der griechischen Handschriften des Neues Testaments. Berlin, New York: Walter de Gruyter. p. 95. ISBN 3-11-011986-2.
- "Liste Handschriften". Münster: Institute for New Testament Textual Research.
- Parpulov, Georgi (2021). Catena Manuscripts of the Greek New Testament (PDF). Piscataway New Jersey: Gorgias Press. p. 241. ISBN 978-1-4632-4260-2.
