= Minuscule 1073 =

- New Testament manuscript
- Text: Gospels, Acts
- Date: 10th/11th century
- Script: Greek
- Now at: Great Lavra
- Size: 22 cm by 17 cm
- Type: Byzantine text-type
- Category: V

Minuscule 1073 (in the Gregory-Aland numbering), δ97 (von Soden), is a 10th or 11th-century Greek minuscule manuscript of the New Testament on parchment. The manuscript has survived in complete condition. It contains additional non-biblical matter. There is no marginalia.

== Description ==
The codex contains the text of the four Gospels and the Book of Acts on 334 parchment leaves (size 22 cm by 17 cm). The original part of the codex with the text of Matthew 1:1-6:1 (folios 1-9) was lost. It was supplied by a later hand on paper.

The text is written in one column per page, 23 lines per page.

It has additional non-biblical material by John Chrysostom and Gregory of Nazianzus (On Pascha) at the end of the codex.

== Text ==
The Greek text of the codex is a representative of the Byzantine text-type. Hermann von Soden included it to the textual family K^{x} (standard Byzantine text). Kurt Aland placed the text of the codex in Category V.

According to the Claremont Profile Method it represents the textual family K^{x} in Luke 1, Luke 10, and Luke 20.

It lacks the spurious texts of Matthew 16:2b–3 (Signs of the times) and the Pericope Adulterae (John 7:53-8:11). The text of Matthew 16:2b-3 was added by a later hand in the margin.

== History ==
- C. R. Gregory dated the manuscript to the 11th century. Currently the manuscript is dated by the INTF to the 10th or 11th century.
- The manuscript was added to the list of New Testament manuscripts by Gregory (1073^{e} and 285^{a}). C. R. Gregory saw it in 1886. In 1908 Gregory gave it the siglum 1073.
- Currently the manuscript is housed at the Great Lavra (A' 51), at Mount Athos.

== See also ==
- List of New Testament minuscules
- Biblical manuscript
- Textual criticism
