= Minuscule 1080 =

- New Testament manuscript
- Text: Gospels
- Date: 14th century
- Script: Greek
- Now at: Great Lavra
- Size: 19.5 cm by 13.5 cm
- Type: Byzantine text-type
- Category: V
- Note: marginalia

Minuscule 1080 (in the Gregory-Aland numbering), A^{312} (von Soden), is a 9th-century Greek minuscule manuscript of the New Testament on parchment. The manuscript has not survived in complete condition.

== Description ==
The codex contains the text of the four Gospels with a commentary on 411 parchment leaves (size 19.5 cm by 13.5 cm). The Gospel of Mark does not have a commentary.

The text is written in one column per page, 20 lines per page.

The text is divided according to chapters (κεφαλαια), whose numbers are given at the margin, and their titles (τιτλοι) at the top of the pages. There is also a division according to the Ammonian Sections (in Mark 233 Sections, the last in 16:8), with references to the Eusebian Canons (written in the same line with Ammonian Section numbers). It has some illustrations.

== Text ==
The Greek text of the codex is a representative of the Byzantine text-type. Hermann von Soden included it to the textual family A^{b}. Kurt Aland placed the Greek text of the codex in Category V.

According to the Claremont Profile Method it represents the textual family K^{x} in Luke 1, and Luke 20. In Luke 10 it has a mixture of the Byzantine families. It is close to Codex Athous Dionysiou.

It lacks the text of Matthew 16:2b–3 (Signs of the times) (added by a later hand it in the margin) and the Pericope Adulterae (John 7:53-8:11).

== History ==
C. R. Gregory dated the manuscript to the 9th or 10th century. Currently the manuscript is dated by the INTF to the 9th century.

The manuscript was added to the list of New Testament manuscripts by Gregory (1080^{e}). C. R. Gregory saw it in 1886. In 1908 Gregory gave it the siglum 1080.

Currently the manuscript is housed at the Great Lavra (A' 15), at Mount Athos.

== See also ==
- List of New Testament minuscules
- Minuscule 1093
- Textual criticism
