= Minuscule 1152 =

- New Testament manuscript
- Text: Gospels
- Date: May 4, 1133
- Script: Greek
- Found: Édhessa, Greece (Macedonia)
- Now at: The University of Chicago Library
- Size: 125 x 98 mm
- Type: Byzantine text-type
- Category: none

Minuscule 1152 (in the Gregory-Aland numbering), also known as the Nicolaus Gospels, or Goodspeed Ms. Grk. 11. It is a Greek minuscule manuscript of the four Gospels, dated paleographically May 4, 1133.

== Description ==
The codex contains the complete text of the four Gospels, and contains 15th century Lectionary tables of Synaxarion and Menologion.

It is currently housed at the University of Chicago Library(Ms. 129).

== History ==
It was written in Édhessa, Greece (Macedonia), on May 4, 1133.

== See also ==
- List of New Testament minuscules (1001–2000)
- Purple parchment
- Textual criticism
