= Minuscule 1074 =

- New Testament manuscript
- Text: Gospels
- Date: 11th century
- Script: Greek
- Now at: Great Lavra
- Size: 22 cm by 17 cm
- Type: Byzantine text-type
- Category: V
- Note: marginalia

Minuscule 1074 (in the Gregory-Aland numbering), ε2007 (von Soden), is an 11th-century Greek minuscule manuscript of the New Testament on parchment. The manuscript has not survived in complete condition. It has some marginalia.

== Description ==
The codex contains the text of the four Gospels on 201 parchment leaves (size 22 cm by 17 cm), with two lacunae at the end (John 19:35-20:31; 21:17-21).

The text is written in one column per page, 26 lines per page.

The text of the Gospels is divided according to the small Ammonian Sections, whose numbers are given at the margin, without references to the Eusebian Canons, but it has a Harmony to the four Gospels in the bottom margin. There is no another system division in this manuscript (according to the κεφαλαια). It also has lectionary markings in the margin for liturgical use.

== Text ==
The Greek text of the codex is a representative of the Byzantine text-type. Hermann von Soden included it to the textual family K^{x}. Kurt Aland placed the Greek text of the codex in Category V.

According to the Claremont Profile Method it represents the textual family K^{x} in Luke 1, and Luke 20. In Luke 10 it has a mixture of the Byzantine families.

It lacks the text of Matthew 16:2b–3 (Signs of the times).

== History ==
C. R. Gregory dated the manuscript to the 11th century. Currently the manuscript is dated by the INTF to the 11th century.

The manuscript was added to the list of New Testament manuscripts by Gregory (1074^{e}). C. R. Gregory saw it in 1886. In 1908 Gregory gave it the siglum 1074.

Currently the manuscript is housed at the Great Lavra (A' 1), at Mount Athos.

== See also ==
- List of New Testament minuscules
- Biblical manuscript
- Textual criticism
