= List of New Testament minuscules (1101–1200) =

A New Testament minuscule is a copy of a portion of the New Testament written in a small, cursive Greek script (developed from Uncial).

== Legend ==
- The numbers (#) are the now standard system of Caspar René Gregory, often referred to as the Gregory-Aland numbers.
- Included among the cataloged minuscules are the following types of manuscripts, color coded:

Grey represents continuous text manuscripts containing only New Testament portions
Beige represents manuscripts with New Testament portions and a catena (quotations from church fathers)
Light cyan represents manuscripts of single-author commentaries who included the full Scripture text.
Light red represents manuscripts of single-author commentaries who included both the full Scripture text and a catena.
Light purple represents manuscripts of commentaries where the Scripture text was abridged.
White represents manuscript numbers no longer in use.

- Dates are estimated to the nearest 100 year increment where specific date is unknown.
- Content generally only describes sections of the New Testament: Gospels, The Acts of the Apostles (Acts), Pauline epistles, and so on. Sometimes the surviving portion of a codex is so limited that specific books, chapters or even verses can be indicated. Linked articles, where they exist, generally specify content in detail, by verse.
- Digital images are referenced with direct links to the hosting web pages, with the exception of those at the INTF. The quality and accessibility of the images is as follows:

Gold color indicates high resolution color images available online.
Tan color indicates high resolution color images available locally, not online.
Light tan color indicates only a small fraction of manuscript pages with color images available online.
Light gray color indicates black/white or microfilm images available online.
Light blue color indicates manuscript not imaged, and is currently lost or ownership unknown.
Light pink color indicates manuscript destroyed, presumed destroyed, or deemed too fragile to digitize.
Violet color indicates high resolution ultraviolet images available online.

† Indicates the manuscript has damaged or missing pages.
^{P} Indicates only a portion of the books were included.
^{K} Indicates manuscript also includes a commentary.
^{S} Indicates lost portions of manuscript replaced via supplement of a later hand.
^{abs} (abschrift) Indicates manuscript is copy.
[ ] Brackets around Gregory-Aland number indicate the manuscript belongs to an already numbered manuscript, was found to not be a continuous text manuscript, was found to be written in modern Greek versus Koine Greek, was proved a forgery, or has been destroyed.

== Minuscules 1101–1200 ==
#	Date	Contents	Pages	Institution and refs.	City, State	Country	Images
1101	1660	Acts†, General Epistles†, Pauline epistles†	306	Dionysiou Monastery, 382	Mount Athos	Greece	INTF
1102	14th	Acts, General Epistles, Pauline epistles	197	Docheiariou Monastery, 38	Mount Athos	Greece	INTF
1103	13th	Acts, General Epistles, Pauline Epistles	373	Docheiariou Monastery, 48	Mount Athos	Greece	INTF
1104	1702	Acts, General Epistles, Pauline Epistles	223	Docheiariou Monastery, 136	Mount Athos	Greece	MAR
1105	15th	Acts, General Epistles, Pauline Epistles	338	Docheiariou Monastery, 139	Mount Athos	Greece	MAR
1106	14th	Acts, General Epistles †, Pauline Epistles †	183	Docheiariou Monastery, 147	Mount Athos	Greece	MAR
1107	13th	Acts, General Epistles, Pauline Epistles	194	Esphigmenou Monastery, 63	Mount Athos	Greece	INTF
1108	13th	Acts, General Epistles †, Pauline Epistles †	155	Esphigmenou Monastery, 64	Mount Athos	Greece	
1109	14th	Acts, General Epistles, Pauline Epistles		Owner unknown. Formerly: Esphigmenou Monastery, 65	Mount Athos	Greece	
1110	10th	Gospels	298	Stavronikita Monastery, 43	Mount Athos	Greece	MAR
1111	14th	Gospels	3008	Stavronikita Monastery, 53	Mount Athos	Greece	MAR
1112	12th	Zigabenus Commentary on Mark 12:19 – Luke 10:30	31	Stavronikita Monastery, 54	Mount Athos	Greece	MAR
1113	13th	Gospels	188	Stavronikita Monastery, 56	Mount Athos	Greece	MAR
1114	14th	Gospels	365	Stavronikita Monastery, 70	Mount Athos	Greece	INTF
1115	12th	Acts†, General epistles†, Pauline epistles†	126	Esphigmenou Monastery, 66	Mount Athos	Greece	INTF
1116	15th	Luke^{P}†, John^{P}†,	79	Stavronikita Monastery, 127	Mount Athos	Greece	MAR
1117	14th	Gospels	426	Philotheou Monastery, 5	Mount Athos	Greece	INTF
1118	12th	Gospels	287	Philotheou Monastery, 21	Mount Athos	Greece	INTF
1119	14th	Mark^{P}†, Luke^{P}†, John^{P}†	210	Philotheou Monastery, 22	Mount Athos	Greece	INTF
1120	10th	Gospels	221	Philotheou Monastery, 33	Mount Athos	Greece	INTF
1121	1304	Gospels	345	Philotheou Monastery, 39	Mount Athos	Greece	INTF
1122	13th	Gospels	264	Philotheou Monastery, 41	Mount Athos	Greece	INTF
1123	11th	Gospels	226	Philotheou Monastery, 44	Mount Athos	Greece	INTF
1124	12th	Mark 6:11–16:20; Luke 1:25–16:24	51	Philotheou Monastery, 45	Mount Athos	Greece	INTF
1125	12th	Gospels	192	Philotheou Monastery, 46	Mount Athos	Greece	INTF
1126	13th	Gospels	269	Philotheou Monastery, 47	Mount Athos	Greece	INTF
1127	12th	Gospels, Acts, General Epistles, Pauline Epistles	345	Philotheou Monastery, 48	Mount Athos	Greece	INTF
1128	12th	Matthew† 17:15–28:19, Mark, Luke, John	174	Philotheou Monastery, 51	Mount Athos	Greece	INTF
1129	13th	Matthew† 20:23–28:20, Mark†, Luke†	150	Philotheou Monastery, 53	Mount Athos	Greece	INTF
1130	15th	Theophylact Commentary on the Gospels†	218	Philotheou Monastery, 68	Mount Athos	Greece	INTF
1131	15th	Gospels	295	Philotheou Monastery, 71	Mount Athos	Greece	INTF
1132	15th	Gospels	282	Philotheou Monastery, 72	Mount Athos	Greece	INTF
1133	14th	Gospels †	256	Philotheou Monastery, 74	Mount Athos	Greece	INTF
1134	1671	Gospels	?	Philotheou Monastery, 77	Mount Athos	Greece	
1135	15th	Gospels †	245	Philotheou Monastery, 78	Mount Athos	Greece	INTF
1136	1337	Gospels	260	Philotheou Monastery, 80	Mount Athos	Greece	INTF
1137	13th	Theophylact Commentary on the Gospels†	256	Philotheou Monastery, 86	Mount Athos	Greece	INTF
1138	12th	Gospels	257	Hilandar Monastery, 5	Mount Athos	Greece	INTF
1139	1728	Gospels	235	Hilandar Monastery, 19	Mount Athos	Greece	INTF
1140	1242	Acts, General Epistles, Pauline Epistles	236	Esphigmenou Monastery, 67	Mount Athos	Greece	INTF
1141	11th	Gospels	236	National Archives of Albania, Kod. Br. 4	Tirana	Albania	CSNTM
1142	13th	Gospels	250	Houghton Library, Harvard University, MS Typ 215	Cambridge, MA	USA	HL
1142	13th	Gospels	1	Dumbarton Oaks, acc. no. 58.105, 1 fol. (J. miniat.)	Washington, DC	USA	CSNTM
1143	9th	Gospels	422	National Archives of Albania, No. 2	Tirana	Albania	CSNTM
1144	12th	Gospels	168	Ecumenical Patriarchate, Chalki, Triados, 9 (11)	Istanbul	Turkey	INTF
1144	12th	Gospels	168	Ecumenical Patriarchate, Chalki, Triados, 9 (11)	Istanbul	Turkey	CSNTM
1145	12th	Gospels	300	Ecumenical Patriarchate, Chalki, Triados, 10 (12)	Istanbul	Turkey	INTF
1145	12th	Gospels	300	Ecumenical Patriarchate, Chalki, Triados, 10 (12)	Istanbul	Turkey	CSNTM
1146	14th	Gospels	290	Ecumenical Patriarchate, Chalki, Kamariotissis, 8	Istanbul	Turkey	INTF
1147	1370	Gospels	188	Ecumenical Patriarchate, Chalki, Kamariotissis, 27	Istanbul	Turkey	CSNTM
1147	1370	Gospels	188	Ecumenical Patriarchate, Chalki, Kamariotissis, 27	Istanbul	Turkey	INTF
1148	13th	Gospels	245	Ecumenical Patriarchate, Panaghia 95	Istanbul	Turkey	INTF
1149	13th	Gospels, Acts, General Epistles, Pauline Epistles	461	Ecumenical Patriarchate, Chalki, Kamariotissis, 130 (133)	Istanbul	Turkey	INTF
1149	13th	Gospels, Acts, General Epistles, Pauline Epistles	461	Ecumenical Patriarchate, Chalki, Kamariotissis, 130 (133)	Istanbul	Turkey	CSNTM
[1150] = 1016							
[1151] = 2381		Slavic Tetraevangelium					
1152	1133	Gospels	218	University of Chicago Library, Ms. 129	Chicago	USA	TUOCL
1152	1133	Gospels	218	University of Chicago Library, Ms. 129	Chicago	USA	INTF
[1153] = 2381							
[1154] = 2862							
1155	14th	Gospels†	422	National Library, Taphu 390	Athens	Greece	INTF
1156	1322	Theophylact Commentary on Gospel of Matthew	36	Leimonos Monastery, Ms. Lesbiacus Leimonos 35, fol. 121-156	Kalloni, Lesbos	Greece	LM
1156	1322	Theophylact Commentary on Gospel of Matthew	36	Leimonos Monastery, Ms. Lesbiacus Leimonos 35, fol. 121-156	Kalloni, Lesbos	Greece	INTF
1157	11th	Gospels †	398	Leimonos Monastery, Ms. Lesbiacus Leimonos 67	Kalloni, Lesbos	Greece	LM
1157	11th	Gospels †	398	Leimonos Monastery, Ms. Lesbiacus Leimonos 67	Kalloni, Lesbos	Greece	INTF
1158	15th	Gospels	351	Leimonos Monastery, Ms. Lesbiacus Leimonos 97	Kalloni, Lesbos	Greece	LM
1158	15th	Gospels	351	Leimonos Monastery, Ms. Lesbiacus Leimonos 97	Kalloni, Lesbos	Greece	INTF
1159	14th	Matthew†, Mark† Luke†	178	Leimonos Monastery, Ms. Lesbiacus Leimonos 99	Kalloni, Lesbos	Greece	LM
1159	14th	Matthew†, Mark† Luke†	178	Leimonos Monastery, Ms. Lesbiacus Leimonos 99	Kalloni, Lesbos	Greece	INTF
1160	12th	Matthew, Mark, Luke†	368	Monastery of Saint John the Theologian, 58	Patmos	Greece	INTF
1160	12th	Theophylact Commentary on John	159	Monastery of Saint John the Theologian, 58	Patmos	Greece	INTF
[1160^{abs}]= 2887							
1161	1280	Acts, General Epistles, Pauline Epistles	253	Monastery of Saint John the Theologian, 14	Patmos	Greece	CSNTM
1162	11th	Acts (no commentary), General Epistles, Pauline Epistles	356	Monastery of Saint John the Theologian, 15	Patmos	Greece	INTF
1162	11th	Acts (no commentary), General Epistles, Pauline Epistles	356	Monastery of Saint John the Theologian, 15	Patmos	Greece	CSNTM
1163	1038	Gospels	270	Monastery of Saint John the Theologian, 76	Patmos	Greece	INTF
1163	1038	Gospels	270	Monastery of Saint John the Theologian, 76	Patmos	Greece	CSNTM
1164	11th	Gospels	255	Monastery of Saint John the Theologian, 80	Patmos	Greece	CSNTM
1164	11th	Gospels	255	Monastery of Saint John the Theologian, 80	Patmos	Greece	INTF
1165	1335	Gospels	299	Monastery of Saint John the Theologian, 81	Patmos	Greece	CSNTM
1165	1335	Gospels	299	Monastery of Saint John the Theologian, 81	Patmos	Greece	INTF
1166	10th	Gospels	309	Monastery of Saint John the Theologian, 82	Patmos	Greece	INTF
1166	10th	Gospels	309	Monastery of Saint John the Theologian, 82	Patmos	Greece	CSNTM
1167	11th/12th	Gospels	282	Monastery of Saint John the Theologian, 83	Patmos	Greece	INTF
1168	11th	Gospels	268	Monastery of Saint John the Theologian, 84	Patmos	Greece	INTF
1168	11th	Gospels	268	Monastery of Saint John the Theologian, 84	Patmos	Greece	CSNTM
1169	12th	Gospels †	196	Monastery of Saint John the Theologian, 90	Patmos	Greece	INTF
1170	11th	Gospels †	219	Monastery of Saint John the Theologian, 92	Patmos	Greece	INTF
1171	13th	Gospels	203	Monastery of Saint John the Theologian, 94	Patmos	Greece	INTF
1172	10th	Gospels	344	Monastery of Saint John the Theologian, 95	Patmos	Greece	INTF
1172	10th	Gospels	344	Monastery of Saint John the Theologian, 95	Patmos	Greece	CSNTM
1173	13th	Gospels	253	Monastery of Saint John the Theologian, 96	Patmos	Greece	INTF
1174	11th	Gospels †	157	Monastery of Saint John the Theologian, 97	Patmos	Greece	INTF
1175	10th	Acts†, General Epistles†, Pauline Epistles†	203	Monastery of Saint John the Theologian, 16	Patmos	Greece	INTF
1175	10th	Acts†, General Epistles†, Pauline Epistles†	203	Monastery of Saint John the Theologian, 16	Patmos	Greece	CSNTM
1176 + [2504]	13th	Gospels †	155	Monastery of Saint John the Theologian, 100 leaves, 238 fol. ebda, 739, 55 leaves fol. (Mt 12–23)	Patmos	Greece	INTF
1177	13th	Theophylact Commentary on Luke 11:14–24:53	112	Monastery of Saint John the Theologian, 117	Patmos	Greece	INTF
1178	13th	Zigabenus Commentary on Gospels	451	Monastery of Saint John the Theologian, 203	Patmos	Greece	INTF
1179	1282	Gospels	285	Monastery of Saint John the Theologian, 275	Patmos	Greece	CSNTM
1179	1282	Gospels	285	Monastery of Saint John the Theologian, 275	Patmos	Greece	INTF
1180	15th	Gospels	314	Monastery of Saint John the Theologian, 333	Patmos	Greece	INTF
1181	1368	Gospels	361	Monastery of Saint John the Theologian, 334	Patmos	Greece	INTF
1182	14th	Theophylact Commentary on the Gospels†	324	National Library, 2087	Athens	Greece	INTF
1183	14th	Theophylact Commentary on Mark†, John†	194	National Library, 2111	Athens	Greece	CSNTM
1184	13th	John^{K P}		Owner unknown. Formerly: J. G. Spyriu	Thessaloniki	Greece	
1185	14th	Gospels	258	Saint Catherine's Monastery, Gr. 148	Sinai	Egypt	LOC, CSNTM
1186	12th	Gospels	300	Saint Catherine's Monastery, Gr. 149	Sinai	Egypt	LOC, INTF, CSNTM
1187	11th	Gospels	307	Saint Catherine's Monastery, Gr. 150	Sinai	Egypt	LOC, CSNTM
1188	11th/12th	Gospels	261	Saint Catherine's Monastery, Gr. 151	Sinai	Egypt	LOC, INTF, CSNTM
1189	1346	Gospels	489	Saint Catherine's Monastery, Gr. 152	Sinai	Egypt	LOC, CSNTM
1190	12th	Gospels	421	Saint Catherine's Monastery, Gr. 153	Sinai	Egypt	LOC, INTF, CSNTM
1191	11th/12th	Gospels	247	Saint Catherine's Monastery, Gr. 154	Sinai	Egypt	LOC, INTF, CSNTM
1192	11th	Gospels	243	Saint Catherine's Monastery, Gr. 155	Sinai	Egypt	LOC, INTF, CSNTM
1193	12th	Gospels	192	Saint Catherine's Monastery, Gr. 156	Sinai	Egypt	LOC, CSNTM
1194	11th	Gospels	269	Saint Catherine's Monastery, Gr. 157	Sinai	Egypt	LOC, INTF, CSNTM
1195	11th	Gospels	308	Saint Catherine's Monastery, Gr. 158	Sinai	Egypt	LOC, INTF, CSNTM
1196	14th	Gospels	211	Saint Catherine's Monastery, Gr. 159	Sinai	Egypt	LOC, INTF, CSNTM
1197	12th	Gospels	385	Saint Catherine's Monastery, Gr. 160	Sinai	Egypt	LOC, CSNTM
1198	12th	Gospels	358	Saint Catherine's Monastery, Gr. 161	Sinai	Egypt	LOC, CSNTM
1199	12th	Gospels	308	Saint Catherine's Monastery, Gr. 162	Sinai	Egypt	LOC, CSNTM
1200	12th	Gospels †	279	Saint Catherine's Monastery, Gr. 163	Sinai	Egypt	LOC, INTF, CSNTM

[top]

== See also ==
- List of New Testament papyri
- List of New Testament uncials
- List of New Testament minuscules (1–1000)
- List of New Testament minuscules (1001–2000)
- List of New Testament minuscules (2001–)
- List of New Testament minuscules ordered by Location/Institution
- List of New Testament lectionaries

== Bibliography ==
- Aland, Kurt; M. Welte; B. Köster; K. Junack (1994). Kurzgefasste Liste der griechischen Handschriften des Neues Testaments. Berlin, New York: Walter de Gruyter. p. 95. ISBN 3-11-011986-2.
- "Liste Handschriften". Münster: Institute for New Testament Textual Research.
