= List of New Testament lectionaries (1001–1500) =

A New Testament Lectionary is a handwritten copy of a lectionary, or book of New Testament Bible readings. Lectionaries may be written in majuscule or minuscule Greek letters, on parchment, papyrus, vellum, or paper.

Lectionaries which have the Gospels readings are called Evangeliaria or Evangelistaria, those which have the Acts or Epistles, Apostoli or Praxapostoli. They appear from the 6th century.

Gregory in 1909 enumerated 2234 lectionaries. To the present day 2484 lectionary manuscripts have been catalogued by the (INTF) in Münster.

Below is the list of lectionary 1001 to 1500. For other related lists, see:

- List of New Testament lectionaries
- List of New Testament lectionaries (1–500)
- List of New Testament lectionaries (501–1000)
- List of New Testament lectionaries (1501–2000)

== Legend ==
- The numbers (#) are the now standard system of Caspar René Gregory (Gregory–Aland).
- Dates are estimated to the nearest century (except lectionaries dated by scribes which are shown in the Date column).
- Content only the Gospel lessons (Evangelistarion), and other lessons from the rest of the NT apart from Revelation (Apostolos). Sometimes the surviving portion of a codex is so limited that specific books, chapters or even verses can be indicated. Linked articles, where they exist, generally specify content in detail, by verse.
- Digital images are referenced with direct links to the hosting web pages. The quality and accessibility of the images is as follows:

Gold color indicates high resolution color images available online.
Tan color indicates high resolution color images available locally, not online.
Light tan color indicates only a small fraction of manuscript pages with color images available online.
Light gray color indicates black/white or microfilm images available online.
Light blue color indicates manuscript not imaged, and is currently lost or ownership unknown.
Light pink color indicates manuscript destroyed, presumed destroyed, or deemed too fragile to digitize.
Violet color indicates high resolution ultraviolet images available online.

Contents Legend:
† Indicates the manuscript has damaged or missing pages.
^{P} Indicates only a portion of the original book remains.
^{K} Indicates manuscript also includes commentary notes.
^{sel} Indicates contents include Scripture readings for selected days only.
^{e} Indicates contents include weekday Scripture readings.
^{esk} Indicates contents include weekday Scripture readings from Easter to Pentecost and Saturday/Sunday readings for other weeks.
^{sk} Indicates contents include only Saturday and Sunday Scripture readings.
^{Lit} Indicates Liturgical book containing an assortment of New Testament texts.
^{PsO} Indicates a Psalter with Biblical Odes.
[ ] Brackets around Gregory-Aland number indicate the number is no longer is use.

Script Legend:
ΑΩ indicates Majuscule script
αω indicates Minuscule script
P^{U} indicates manuscript is a palimpsest and script is the text under the later script.
P^{O} indicates manuscript is a palimpsest and script is the text over the prior script.

== List of named or notable lectionaries ==
=== Lectionaries 1001–1100 ===
#	Date	Contents	Script	Pages	Institution	City, State	Country	Images
ℓ 1001	11th	†Gospels^{esk}	αω	223	Patriarchate of Jerusalem, Saba 84	Jerusalem	Israel	CSNTM
ℓ 1001	11th	†Gospels^{esk}	αω	6	Russian National Library, Gr. 307	Saint Petersburg	Russia	
ℓ 1002	12th	Gospels^{esk}	αω	176	Patriarchate of Jerusalem, Saba 104	Jerusalem	Israel	CSNTM
ℓ 1003	1019	Gospels^{esk}	αω	224	Patriarchate of Jerusalem, Saba 144	Jerusalem	Israel	CSNTM
ℓ 1003	1019	Gospels^{esk}	αω	4	Russian National Library, Gr. 287	Saint Petersburg	Russia	
ℓ 1004	11th	Gospels^{e}	αω	290	Patriarchate of Jerusalem, Saba 152	Jerusalem	Israel	CSNTM
ℓ 1005	13th	Gospels^{esk}	αω	134	Patriarchate of Jerusalem, Saba 153	Jerusalem	Israel	
ℓ 1005	13th	Gospels^{esk}	αω	2	Russian National Library, Gr. 309	Saint Petersburg	Russia	
ℓ 1006	11th	†Gospels^{esk}	αω	205	Patriarchate of Jerusalem, Saba 154	Jerusalem	Israel	
ℓ 1007	13th	†Gospels^{esk}	αω	229	Patriarchate of Jerusalem, Saba 178	Jerusalem	Israel	CSNTM
ℓ 1008=[ℓ1421]	1628	Gospels^{e}	αω	551	Patriarchate of Jerusalem, Saba 186 & 187	Jerusalem	Israel	
ℓ 1008=[ℓ1421]	1628	Gospels^{e}	αω	2	Russian National Library, Gr. 402	Saint Petersburg	Russia	
ℓ 1009	13th	†Gospels^{esk}	αω	538	Patriarchate of Jerusalem, Saba 188	Jerusalem	Israel	CSNTM
ℓ 1009	13th	†Gospels^{esk}	αω	2	Russian National Library, Gr. 401	Saint Petersburg	Russia	
ℓ 1010	13th	†Gospels^{e}	αω	320	Patriarchate of Jerusalem, Saba 202	Jerusalem	Israel	CSNTM
[ℓ 1011]=ℓ 1424								
ℓ 1012	14th	Gospels + Apostles^{esk}	αω	307	Patriarchate of Jerusalem, Saba 205	Jerusalem	Israel	CSNTM
ℓ 1013	1184	Gospels^{e}	αω	215	Patriarchate of Jerusalem, Saba 235	Jerusalem	Israel	CSNTM
ℓ 1013	1184	Gospels^{e}	αω	1	Russian National Library, Gr. 299	Saint Petersburg	Russia	
ℓ 1014	10th	†Gospels^{e}	αω	272	Patriarchate of Jerusalem, Saba 236	Jerusalem	Israel	CSNTM
ℓ 1015	13th	†Gospels^{e}	αω	207	Patriarchate of Jerusalem, Saba 245	Jerusalem	Israel	CSNTM
[ℓ 1016]=ℓ 1419								
ℓ 1017	12th	Gospels^{Lit}	αω	396	Patriarchate of Jerusalem, Saba 257	Jerusalem	Israel	
ℓ 1018	13th	†Gospels^{esk}	αω	126	Patriarchate of Jerusalem, Saba 356	Jerusalem	Israel	
ℓ 1018	13th	†Gospels^{esk}	αω	2	Russian National Library, Gr. 312	Saint Petersburg	Russia	
ℓ 1019	11th	Gospels^{esk}	αω	227	Patriarchate of Jerusalem, Saba 360	Jerusalem	Israel	CSNTM
ℓ 1019	11th	Gospels^{esk}	αω	2	Russian National Library, Gr. 284	Saint Petersburg	Russia	
ℓ 1020	12th	Gospels^{P}	αω	8	Patriarchate of Jerusalem, Saba 605, fol. 74-81	Jerusalem	Israel	CSNTM
ℓ 1021	12th	Gospels + Apostles^{esk}	αω	182	Patriarchate of Jerusalem, Saba 612	Jerusalem	Israel	CSNTM
ℓ 1022	1535	Gospels^{e}	αω	298	Patriarchate of Jerusalem, Stavru 9	Jerusalem	Israel	CSNTM
ℓ 1023	11th	†Gospels^{esk}	αω	370	Patriarchate of Jerusalem, Stavru 26	Jerusalem	Israel	CSNTM
ℓ 1024	11th	†Gospels^{esk}	αω	397	Patriarchate of Jerusalem, Stavru 44	Jerusalem	Israel	CSNTM
ℓ 1025	13th	†Gospels^{esk}	αω	101	Patriarchate of Jerusalem, Stavru 51	Jerusalem	Israel	CSNTM
ℓ 1026	1647	Gospels^{e}	αω	1	Chester Beatty Library, CBL W 143.4.13	Dublin	Ireland	CSNTM
ℓ 1026	1647	Gospels^{e}	αω	261	Patriarchate of Jerusalem, Anastaseos 1	Jerusalem	Israel	CSNTM
ℓ 1027	1610	Gospels^{e}	αω	14	Chester Beatty Library, CBL W 143.4.4–12, 14, 15; 143.5.1, 2, 4	Dublin	Ireland	CSNTM
ℓ 1027	1610	Gospels^{e}	αω	294	Patriarchate of Jerusalem, Anastaseos 2	Jerusalem	Israel	CSNTM
ℓ 1027	1610	Gospels^{e}	αω	1	University Library, Collect. Dortmond 140	Amsterdam	Netherlands	
ℓ 1028	1633	Gospels^{e}	αω	234	Patriarchate of Jerusalem, Anastaseos 3	Jerusalem	Israel	CSNTM
ℓ 1029	1594	Gospels^{e}	αω	425	Walters Art Museum, Ms. W. 535	Baltimore, MD	United States	WAM
ℓ 1030	1596	Gospels^{e}	αω	1	Chester Beatty Library, CBL W 143.5.3	Dublin	Ireland	CSNTM
ℓ 1030	1596	Gospels^{e}	αω	512	Patriarchate of Jerusalem, Anastaseos 5	Jerusalem	Israel	CSNTM
ℓ 1030	1596	Gospels^{e}	αω	4	Morgan Library & Museum, MS M. 654.1-4	New York, NY	United States	
ℓ 1030	1596	Gospels^{e}	αω	2	Princeton University Art Museum, y1954-67 and y1954-68	Princeton , NJ	United States	
ℓ 1030	1596	Gospels^{e}	αω	1	University of Toronto Malcove Collection, MS 82.446	Toronto	Canada	
ℓ 1031	16th	Gospels^{e}	αω	3	Chester Beatty Library, CBL W 143.4.1, 2, 3	Dublin	Ireland	CSNTM
ℓ 1031	16th	Gospels^{e}	αω	265	Patriarchate of Jerusalem, Monê Abraham 7	Jerusalem	Israel	CSNTM
ℓ 1032	15th	Gospels^{e}	αω	440	Patriarchate of Jerusalem, Anastaseos 8	Jerusalem	Israel	CSNTM
ℓ 1033	1152	Gospels^{e}	αω	233	Patriarchate of Jerusalem, Anastaseos 9	Jerusalem	Israel	CSNTM
ℓ 1034	16th	Gospels^{e}	αω	220	Patriarchate of Jerusalem, Anastaseos 10	Jerusalem	Israel	CSNTM
ℓ 1035	13th	Gospels^{e}	αω	252	Patriarchate of Jerusalem, Anastaseos 11	Jerusalem	Israel	CSNTM
ℓ 1036	1596	Gospels^{e}	αω	446	Patriarchate of Jerusalem, Skevophylakion 1	Jerusalem	Israel	
ℓ 1037	1642	Gospels^{e}	αω	343	Patriarchate of Jerusalem, Skevophylakion 3	Jerusalem	Israel	
ℓ 1038	12th	Gospels^{esk}	αω	304	Patriarchate of Jerusalem, Nea Syllogi (Photiu), 1	Jerusalem	Israel	CSNTM
ℓ 1039	11th	Gospels^{e}	αω	322	Patriarchate of Jerusalem, Nea Syllogi (Photiu), 2	Jerusalem	Israel	CSNTM
ℓ 1040	13th	Gospels^{P}	αω	13	Patriarchate of Jerusalem, Nea Syllogi (Photiu), 53	Jerusalem	Israel	CSNTM
[ℓ 1041]								
[ℓ 1042]								
ℓ 1043	5th	Gospels^{P}	ΑΩ	5	Austrian National Library, Pap. G 2324	Vienna	Austria	CSNTM
ℓ 1044	10th	Gospels^{sel}	ΑΩ	156	Central University Library, Ms. IV. 34	Iasi	Romania	
ℓ 1045	16th	Gospels^{sk}	αω	200	Owner Unknown			
ℓ 1046	1542	Gospels + Apostles^{Lit}	αω	211	Vatican Library, Reg. gr. Pii II 34	Vatican City	Vatican City	INTF
ℓ 1047	1620	Gospels	αω	89	National Library of Greece	Athens	Greece	
ℓ 1048	11th	Gospels^{P}	αω	2	Patriarchate of Jerusalem, Saba 572	Jerusalem	Israel	CSNTM
ℓ 1049	12th	†Gospels^{e}	αω	229	Panachrantos Monastery, 1	Andros	Greece	
ℓ 1050	12th	Gospels^{esk}	αω	184	Panachrantos Monastery, 3	Andros	Greece	
ℓ 1051	1522	†Gospels^{esk}	αω	296	Panachrantos Monastery, 15	Andros	Greece	
ℓ 1052	16th	Gospels + Apostles^{e}	αω	385	Monastery of Saint John the Theologian, 557	Patmos	Greece	
ℓ 1053	13th	Luke 24:25-35; John 1:35-50	αω	2	British Library, Add MS 19392B	London	United Kingdom	BL
ℓ 1054	1595	Gospels^{e}	αω	273	Stavronikita Monastery, 97	Mount Athos	Greece	
ℓ 1055	14th	Gospels^{e}	αω	408	Pantokratoros Monastery, 10	Mount Athos	Greece	
ℓ 1056	13th	Gospels^{e}	αω	211	Pantokratoros Monastery, 29	Mount Athos	Greece	LoC
ℓ 1057	14th	Gospels^{sk}	αω	246	Pantokratoros Monastery, 35	Mount Athos	Greece	
ℓ 1058	13th	†Gospels^{e}	αω	242	Pantokratoros Monastery, 36	Mount Athos	Greece	
ℓ 1059	14th	†Gospels^{esk}	αω	222	Pantokratoros Monastery, 55	Mount Athos	Greece	
ℓ 1060	14th	Gospels^{P}	αω	25	Pantokratoros Monastery, 158, fol. 1-25	Mount Athos	Greece	
ℓ 1061	17th	Gospels + Apostles^{Lit}	αω	20	Owner Unknown			
ℓ 1062	15th	Gospels + Apostles^{Lit-P}	αω	298	National Library of Greece, NLG 848	Athens	Greece	CSNTM
ℓ 1063	15th	Gospels + Apostles^{Lit-P}	αω	244	National Library of Greece, 851	Athens	Greece	
[ℓ 1064]=ℓ 1890								
ℓ 1065	11th	Gospels	αω	141	Benaki Museum, TA 144	Athens	Greece	CSNTM
ℓ 1066	11th	†Gospels^{esk}	αω	261	Tenri Central Library, 193. 5-i 28 C 113	Tenri, Nara	Japan	
ℓ 1067	11th	Gospels^{e}	αω	297	Benaki Museum, TA 316 (protheke 30,3)	Athens	Greece	CSNTM
ℓ 1068	11th	Gospels	αω	399	Center for Slavic & Byzantine Studies, D. gr. 157	Sofia	Bulgaria	
ℓ 1069	9th	Gospels	αω	249	Center for Slavic & Byzantine Studies, D. gr. 272	Sofia	Bulgaria	
ℓ 1070	12th/14th	Gospels	αω P^{O}	184	Center for Slavic & Byzantine Studies, D. gr. 150	Sofia	Bulgaria	
ℓ 1071	13th/ 14th	Gospels	αω P^{O}	302	Center for Slavic & Byzantine Studies, D gr. 350	Sofia	Bulgaria	
ℓ 1072	16th	Gospels	αω	185	Center for Slavic & Byzantine Studies, D. gr. 018	Sofia	Bulgaria	
ℓ 1073	10th	†Gospels^{esk}	αω	161	Great Lavra Monastery, A' 30	Mount Athos	Greece	INTF
ℓ 1074	1290	†Gospels^{esk}	αω	123	Great Lavra Monastery, A' 43	Mount Athos	Greece	
ℓ 1075	1032	†Gospels^{esk}	αω	279	Great Lavra Monastery, A' 53	Mount Athos	Greece	INTF
ℓ 1076	10th	†Gospels^{esk}	ΑΩ	212	Great Lavra Monastery, A' 55	Mount Athos	Greece	INTF
ℓ 1077	10th	†Gospels^{esk}	ΑΩ	199	Great Lavra Monastery, A' 56	Mount Athos	Greece	INTF
ℓ 1078	1240	Gospels^{esk}	αω	158	Great Lavra Monastery, A' 71	Mount Athos	Greece	
ℓ 1079	14th	Gospels^{e}	αω	294	Great Lavra Monastery, A' 72	Mount Athos	Greece	INTF
ℓ 1080	13th	†Gospels^{esk}	αω	119	Great Lavra Monastery, A' 80	Mount Athos	Greece	
ℓ 1081	12th	†Gospels^{esk}	αω	173	Great Lavra Monastery, A' 81	Mount Athos	Greece	
ℓ 1082	10th	Gospels^{(e)sk}	ΑΩ	194	Great Lavra Monastery, A' 82	Mount Athos	Greece	INTF
ℓ 1083	13th	Gospels^{esk}	αω	265	Great Lavra Monastery, A' 83	Mount Athos	Greece	
ℓ 1084	1292	Gospels^{e}	αω	288	Great Lavra Monastery, A' 84	Mount Athos	Greece	
ℓ 1085	14th	†Gospels^{esk}	αω	188	Great Lavra Monastery, A' 85	Mount Athos	Greece	
ℓ 1086	11th	†Gospels^{esk}	ΑΩ	326	Great Lavra Monastery, A' 86	Mount Athos	Greece	INTF
ℓ 1087	1307	Apostles	αω	236	Center for Slavic & Byzantine Studies, D. gr. 029	Sofia	Bulgaria	
ℓ 1088	16th	Apostles	αω	216	Center for Slavic & Byzantine Studies, D. gr. 332	Sofia	Bulgaria	
ℓ 1089	11th/12th	Apostles	αω	210	Center for Slavic & Byzantine Studies, D. gr. 196	Sofia	Bulgaria	
ℓ 1090	1505	Apostles	αω	?	Owner Unknown			
ℓ 1091	10th	†Gospels^{esk}	ΑΩ	304	Great Lavra Monastery, A' 92	Mount Athos	Greece	INTF
ℓ 1092	13th	Gospels^{e}	αω	190	Great Lavra Monastery, A' 93	Mount Athos	Greece	INTF
ℓ 1093	12th	Gospels^{esk}	αω	231	Great Lavra Monastery, A' 94	Mount Athos	Greece	
ℓ 1094	13th	Gospels^{e}	αω	207	Great Lavra Monastery, A' 95	Mount Athos	Greece	
ℓ 1095	13th	†Gospels^{esk}	αω	86	Great Lavra Monastery, A' 96	Mount Athos	Greece	
ℓ 1096	10th	†Gospels^{esk}	ΑΩ	222	Great Lavra Monastery, A' 97	Mount Athos	Greece	INTF
ℓ 1097	13th	Gospels^{e}	αω	295	Great Lavra Monastery, A' 98	Mount Athos	Greece	INTF
ℓ 1098	12th	Gospels^{esk}	αω	283	Great Lavra Monastery, A' 100	Mount Athos	Greece	
ℓ 1099	13th	Gospels^{e}	αω	287	Great Lavra Monastery, A' 101	Mount Athos	Greece	
ℓ 1100	10th	†Gospels^{esk}	ΑΩ	188	Great Lavra Monastery, A' 102	Mount Athos	Greece	INTF

[top]

=== Lectionaries 1101–1200 ===
#	Date	Contents	Script	Pages	Institution	City, State	Country	Images
ℓ 1101	12th	Gospels^{sel}	αω	182	Great Lavra Monastery, A' 103	Mount Athos	Greece	
ℓ 1102	13th	Gospels^{e}	αω	339	Great Lavra Monastery, A' 105	Mount Athos	Greece	
ℓ 1103	13th	†Gospels^{esk}	αω	195	Great Lavra Monastery, A' 106	Mount Athos	Greece	
ℓ 1104	13th	Gospels^{esk}	αω	168	Great Lavra Monastery, A' 107	Mount Athos	Greece	
ℓ 1105	10th	Gospels^{P}	ΑΩ	53	Great Lavra Monastery, A' 108	Mount Athos	Greece	
ℓ 1106	12th	†Gospels^{esk}	αω	189	Great Lavra Monastery, A' 110	Mount Athos	Greece	
ℓ 1107	14th	Gospels^{e}	αω	402	Great Lavra Monastery, A' 111	Mount Athos	Greece	
ℓ 1108	14th	Gospels^{e}	αω	300	Great Lavra Monastery, A' 112	Mount Athos	Greece	
ℓ 1109	1367	Gospels^{e}	αω	351	Great Lavra Monastery, A' 113	Mount Athos	Greece	
ℓ 1110	14th	†Gospels^{esk}	αω	232	Great Lavra Monastery, A' 114	Mount Athos	Greece	
ℓ 1111	14th	Gospels^{esk}	αω	273	Great Lavra Monastery, A' 115	Mount Athos	Greece	
ℓ 1112	13th	Gospels^{e}	αω	125	Great Lavra Monastery, A' 116"	Mount Athos	Greece	
ℓ 1113	12th	Gospels^{e}	αω	273	Great Lavra Monastery, A' 117	Mount Athos	Greece	
ℓ 1114	13th	Gospels^{e}	αω	397	Great Lavra Monastery, A' 118	Mount Athos	Greece	
ℓ 1115	14th	†Gospels^{esk}	αω	293	Great Lavra Monastery, A' 119	Mount Athos	Greece	
ℓ 1116	14th	†Gospels^{esk}	αω	217	Great Lavra Monastery, A' 120	Mount Athos	Greece	
ℓ 1117	12th	†Gospels^{esk}	αω	166	Great Lavra Monastery, Γ' 110	Mount Athos	Greece	
ℓ 1118	12th	†Gospels^{esk}	αω	155	Great Lavra Monastery, A' 70	Mount Athos	Greece	
ℓ 1119	14th	†Gospels^{esk}	αω	126	Formerly, Skete of Saint Andrew, 704 (destroyed)	Mount Athos	Greece	
ℓ 1120	13th/14th	†Gospels^{esk}	αω	164	University Classical Seminar, Ms. 75	Thessaloniki	Greece	
ℓ 1120	13th/14th	†Gospels^{esk}	αω	1	Columbia University, Rare Book and Manuscript Library, Plimpton MS 11	New York, NY	United States	CSNTM
ℓ 1121	13th	†Gospels^{e}	αω	250	Formerly, Skete of Saint Andrew, 756 (destroyed)	Mount Athos	Greece	
ℓ 1122	14th	†Gospels^{esk}	αω	213	Formerly, Skete of Saint Andrew, 778 (destroyed)	Mount Athos	Greece	
ℓ 1123	14th	Apostles^{e}	αω	268	Vatopedi Monastery, 854	Mount Athos	Greece	
ℓ 1124	14th	Apostles^{e}	αω	315	Vatopedi Monastery, 855	Mount Athos	Greece	
ℓ 1125	14th	Apostles^{e}	αω	254	Vatopedi Monastery, 856	Mount Athos	Greece	
ℓ 1126	12th	Gospels + Apostles^{sel}	αω	283	Vatopedi Monastery, 866	Mount Athos	Greece	INTF
ℓ 1127	12th	Gospels^{e}	αω	277	Vatopedi Monastery, 879	Mount Athos	Greece	
ℓ 1128	13th	Gospels^{e}	αω	401	Vatopedi Monastery, 880	Mount Athos	Greece	
ℓ 1129	13th	Gospels^{esk}	αω	282	Vatopedi Monastery, 881	Mount Athos	Greece	
ℓ 1130	13th	Gospels^{esk}	αω	237	Vatopedi Monastery, 883	Mount Athos	Greece	
ℓ 1131	13th	Gospels^{e}	αω	235	Vatopedi Monastery, 903	Mount Athos	Greece	INTF
ℓ 1132	1353	Gospels^{e}	αω	463	Vatopedi Monastery, 904	Mount Athos	Greece	
ℓ 1133	13th	†Gospels^{esk}	αω	187	Vatopedi Monastery, 906	Mount Athos	Greece	
ℓ 1134	12th	Gospels^{esk}	αω	165	Vatopedi Monastery, 907	Mount Athos	Greece	
ℓ 1135	14th	Gospels^{e}	αω	337	Vatopedi Monastery, 908	Mount Athos	Greece	INTF
ℓ 1136	13th	†Gospels^{esk}	αω	204	Vatopedi Monastery, 909	Mount Athos	Greece	
ℓ 1137	13th	Gospels^{esk}	αω	156	Vatopedi Monastery, 911	Mount Athos	Greece	
ℓ 1138	13th	†Gospels^{e}	αω	212	Vatopedi Monastery, 912	Mount Athos	Greece	
ℓ 1139	16th	Gospels + Apostles^{sel}	αω	352	Vatopedi Monastery, 916	Mount Athos	Greece	
ℓ 1140	12th	Gospels^{esk}	αω	168	Vatopedi Monastery, 924	Mount Athos	Greece	
ℓ 1141	1105	Gospels + Apostles^{e}	αω	216	Vatopedi Monastery, 925	Mount Athos	Greece	CSNTM
ℓ 1142	14th	Gospels + Apostles^{Lit}	αω	332	Vatopedi Monastery, 984	Mount Athos	Greece	
ℓ 1143	12th	†Gospels^{sk}	αω	104	Vatopedi Monastery, 969	Mount Athos	Greece	
ℓ 1144	1503	Apostles	αω	?	Owner Unknown			
ℓ 1145	16th	†Gospels^{esk}	αω	154	Dionysiou Monastery, 588	Mount Athos	Greece	
ℓ 1146	12th	†Apostles^{e}	αω	82	Koutloumousiou Monastery, 90 β'	Mount Athos	Greece	
ℓ 1147	16th	Gospels^{e}	αω	248	Koutloumousiou Monastery, 288	Mount Athos	Greece	
ℓ 1148	1562	Gospels^{e}	αω	245	Koutloumousiou Monastery, 289	Mount Athos	Greece	
ℓ 1149	1576	Gospels^{e}	αω	250	Koutloumousiou Monastery, 291	Mount Athos	Greece	
ℓ 1150	1697	Gospels^{e}	αω	261	Koutloumousiou Monastery, 293	Mount Athos	Greece	INTF
ℓ 1151	14th	†Apostles^{esk}	αω	93	Great Lavra Monastery, B' 41	Mount Athos	Greece	
ℓ 1152	13th	†Apostles^{esk}	αω	135	Great Lavra Monastery, B' 62	Mount Athos	Greece	
ℓ 1153	14th	Apostles^{e}	αω	287	Great Lavra Monastery, B' 74, fol. 1-287	Mount Athos	Greece	INTF
ℓ 1154	12th	†Apostles^{e}	αω	143	Great Lavra Monastery, B' 79	Mount Athos	Greece	INTF
ℓ 1155	14th	Apostles^{esk}	αω	216	Great Lavra Monastery, B' 85	Mount Athos	Greece	
ℓ 1156	14th	†Apostles	αω	268	Great Lavra Monastery, B' 90	Mount Athos	Greece	INTF
ℓ 1157	13th	Gospels + Apostles^{ek}	αω	179	Great Lavra Monastery, Γ' 6	Mount Athos	Greece	
ℓ 1158	15th	Gospels + Apostles^{esk}	αω	230	Great Lavra Monastery, Γ' 85	Mount Athos	Greece	
ℓ 1159	1331	Apostles^{e}	αω	277	Great Lavra Monastery, Γ' 123	Mount Athos	Greece	INTF
ℓ 1160	13th	†Gospels^{esk}	αω	137	Koutloumousiou Monastery, 648	Mount Athos	Greece	
ℓ 1161	15th	Gospels^{k-K}	αω	234	Great Lavra Monastery, E' 133	Mount Athos	Greece	
ℓ 1162	15th	Gospels^{e}	αω	322	Great Lavra Monastery, E' 138	Mount Athos	Greece	
ℓ 1163	14th	Apostles^{P}	αω	25	Koutloumousiou Monastery, 284, fol. 270-294 (fol. 1-269: 1062)	Mount Athos	Greece	
ℓ 1164	1564	Apostles^{esk}	αω	135	Ecumenical Patriarchate, Chalki, Kamariotissis, 88	Istanbul	Turkey	
ℓ 1165	16th	Gospels^{e}	αω	432	Great Lavra Monastery, Ω' 130	Mount Athos	Greece	
ℓ 1166	1620	Gospels^{esk}	αω	237	Great Lavra Monastery, Ω' 140	Mount Athos	Greece	
ℓ 1167	1653	Gospels^{sk}	αω	162	Great Lavra Monastery, Ω' 142	Mount Athos	Greece	
ℓ 1168	1624	Gospels^{e}	αω	451	Great Lavra Monastery, Ω' 145	Mount Athos	Greece	
ℓ 1169	1654	Gospels^{e}	αω	217	Great Lavra Monastery, Ω' 146	Mount Athos	Greece	
ℓ 1170	17th	†Gospels + Apostles^{esk}	αω	93	Great Lavra Monastery, Λ' 110	Mount Athos	Greece	
ℓ 1171	16th	Apostles^{esk}	αω	161	Great Lavra Monastery, Λ' 124	Mount Athos	Greece	
ℓ 1172	1354	Gospels + Apostles^{sel}	αω	160	Great Lavra Monastery, Λ' 127	Mount Athos	Greece	
ℓ 1173	15th	†Apostles^{esk}	αω	167	Great Lavra Monastery, Λ' 130	Mount Athos	Greece	
ℓ 1174	16th	†Apostles^{esk}	αω	105	Great Lavra Monastery, Λ' 132	Mount Athos	Greece	
ℓ 1175	16th	Apostles^{sk}	αω	305	Great Lavra Monastery, Λ' 133	Mount Athos	Greece	
ℓ 1176	14th	Gospels^{esk}	αω	164	Great Lavra Monastery, Λ' 177	Mount Athos	Greece	
ℓ 1177	14th	†Apostles^{e}	αω	93	Great Lavra Monastery, K' 80, fol. 1-93	Mount Athos	Greece	
ℓ 1178	11th	Apostles^{e}	αω	298	Monastery of Saint John the Theologian, 11	Patmos	Greece	INTF
ℓ 1179	15th	†Apostles^{esk}	αω	261	Great Lavra Monastery, H' 66	Mount Athos	Greece	
ℓ 1180	15th	†Gospels^{esk}	αω	234	Great Lavra Monastery, H' 164	Mount Athos	Greece	
ℓ 1181	1654	Apostles^{e}	αω	251	Great Lavra Monastery, H' 171	Mount Athos	Greece	
ℓ 1182	14th	Gospels^{esk}	αω	270	St. Panteleimon Monastery, 12	Mount Athos	Greece	
ℓ 1183	12th	Gospels^{esk}	αω	175	St. Panteleimon Monastery, 31	Mount Athos	Greece	
ℓ 1184	14th	†Gospels^{esk}	αω	87	St. Panteleimon Monastery, 38	Mount Athos	Greece	
ℓ 1185	13th	Gospels^{P}	αω	24	St. Panteleimon Monastery, 39	Mount Athos	Greece	
ℓ 1186	14th	†Gospels^{esk}	αω	129	St. Panteleimon Monastery, 63	Mount Athos	Greece	
ℓ 1187	13th	†Gospels^{e}	αω	117	St. Panteleimon Monastery, 64	Mount Athos	Greece	
ℓ 1188	14th	Apostles^{e}	αω	255	St. Panteleimon Monastery, 67	Mount Athos	Greece	INTF
ℓ 1189	14th	†Apostles^{esk}	αω	128	St. Panteleimon Monastery, 69	Mount Athos	Greece	
ℓ 1190	10th	Gospels^{P}	ΑΩ	2	St. Panteleimon Monastery, 96, 1	Mount Athos	Greece	
ℓ 1191	12th	Gospels^{P}	αω	5	St. Panteleimon Monastery, 97,1	Mount Athos	Greece	
ℓ 1192	11th	Apostles^{P}	αω	1	St. Panteleimon Monastery, 98 A' 1	Mount Athos	Greece	
ℓ 1193	9th	Gospels^{P}	ΑΩ P^{U}	18	St. Panteleimon Monastery, 100	Mount Athos	Greece	
ℓ 1194	15th	Gospels^{e}	αω	286	St. Panteleimon Monastery, 102	Mount Athos	Greece	
ℓ 1195	16th	Apostles^{esk}	αω	140	St. Panteleimon Monastery, 103	Mount Athos	Greece	
ℓ 1196	16th	Apostles^{e}	αω	269	St. Panteleimon Monastery, 104	Mount Athos	Greece	
ℓ 1197	15th	Apostles^{e}	αω	262	St. Panteleimon Monastery, 105	Mount Athos	Greece	
ℓ 1198	15th	Apostles^{esk}	αω	188	St. Panteleimon Monastery, 106	Mount Athos	Greece	
ℓ 1199	1547	Apostles^{esk}	αω	144	St. Panteleimon Monastery, 107	Mount Athos	Greece	
ℓ 1200	15th	Gospels^{e}	αω	491	St. Panteleimon Monastery, 216	Mount Athos	Greece	

[top]

=== Lectionaries 1201–1300 ===
#	Date	Contents	Script	Pages	Institution	City, State	Country	Images
ℓ 1201	15th	Gospels^{sk}	αω	202	St. Panteleimon Monastery, 761	Mount Athos	Greece	
ℓ 1202	1577	Apostles^{P}	αω	1	Philotheou Monastery, 1840 (76)	Mount Athos	Greece	
ℓ 1203	16th	†Apostles^{e}	αω	?	Xenophontos Monastery, 223	Mount Athos	Greece	
ℓ 1204	11th	Gospels^{P}	αω	50	National Archives of Albania, Kod. Br. 6	Tirana	Albania	CSNTM
[ℓ 1205]								
[ℓ 1206]								
ℓ 1207	1181	Gospels	αω	40	National Archives of Albania, Kod. Br. 21	Tirana	Albania	CSNTM
ℓ 1208	?	Gospels	αω	204	Owner unknown			
[ℓ 1209]								
ℓ 1210	1588	Gospels + Apostles^{Lit}	αω	139	Leimonos Monastery, 100	Kalloni, Lesbos	Greece	
ℓ 1211	15th	Apostles^{esk}	αω	139	Leimonos Monastery, 137	Kalloni, Lesbos	Greece	LM
ℓ 1212	1562	Gospels^{P}	αω	184	Leimonos Monastery, 146	Kalloni, Lesbos	Greece	
ℓ 1213	17th	Gospels^{Lit-P}	αω	192	Leimonos Monastery, 221	Kalloni, Lesbos	Greece	
ℓ 1214	10th	†Gospels^{esk}	ΑΩ P^{U}	159	National Library of Greece, NLG 2112	Athens	Greece	CSNTM
ℓ 1214	10th	†Gospels^{esk}	ΑΩ P^{U}	159	National Library of Greece, NLG 2112	Athens	Greece	CSNTM
ℓ 1215	15th	Gospels^{esk}	αω	279	National Library of Greece, NLG 2114	Athens	Greece	CSNTM
ℓ 1216	9th	Gospels^{esk}	ΑΩ	?	Owner Unknown			
ℓ 1217	12th	Gospels^{e}	αω	325	Byzantine and Christian Museum, 162	Athens	Greece	
ℓ 1218	14th	Apostles^{e}	αω	247	Vlatades Monastery, 2	Thessaloniki	Greece	
ℓ 1219	13th	Gospels^{esk}	αω	139	Vlatades Monastery, 24	Thessaloniki	Greece	
ℓ 1220	1281	Gospels^{e}	αω	202	Vlatades Monastery, 45	Thessaloniki	Greece	
ℓ 1221	14th	†Apostles^{e}	αω	155	Vlatades Monastery, 51	Thessaloniki	Greece	
ℓ 1222	11th	Gospels^{esk}	αω	174	National Library of Greece, NLG 2552	Athens	Greece	CSNTM
ℓ 1222	11th	Gospels^{esk}	αω	1	Walters Art Museum, Ms. W. 530a	Baltimore, MD	United States	WAM
ℓ 1223	13th	†Gospels^{e}	αω	353	National Library of Greece, NLG 2540	Athens	Greece	CSNTM
ℓ 1224	12th	†Gospels^{e}	αω	322	National Library of Greece, NLG 2513	Athens	Greece	CSNTM
ℓ 1225	14th	Gospels^{e}	αω	359	National Library of Greece, NLG 2546	Athens	Greece	CSNTM
ℓ 1226	14th	†Gospels^{e}	αω	122	National Library of Greece, NLG 2549	Athens	Greece	CSNTM
ℓ 1227	12th	Apostles^{e}	αω	235	National Library of Greece, NLG 2551	Athens	Greece	CSNTM
ℓ 1228	12th	Gospels^{esk}	αω	201	National Library of Greece, NLG 2525	Athens	Greece	CSNTM
ℓ 1228	12th	Gospels^{esk}	αω	201	National Library of Greece, NLG 2525	Athens	Greece	CSNTM
ℓ 1229	12th	†Gospels^{esk}	αω	200	National Library of Greece, NLG 2557	Athens	Greece	CSNTM
ℓ 1230	1388	Apostles^{e}	αω	256	National Library of Greece, NLG 2532	Athens	Greece	CSNTM
ℓ 1231	10th	Gospels^{esk}	αω	174	Princeton University Libraries, Scheide M2	Princeton, NJ	United States	
ℓ 1232	14th	†Gospels^{esk}	αω	272	National Library of Greece, NLG 2398, fol. 3-274	Athens	Greece	CSNTM
ℓ 1232	14th	†Gospels^{esk}	αω	272	National Library of Greece, NLG 2398, fol. 3-274	Athens	Greece	CSNTM
ℓ 1233	13th	†Gospels + Apostles^{esk}	αω	310	National Library of Greece, NLG 2493	Athens	Greece	CSNTM
ℓ 1234	14th	Gospels^{sel}	αω P^{O}	11	British Library, Add MS 32643, ff. 185–195	London	United Kingdom	BL
ℓ 1235	14th	†Gospels^{esk}	αω P^{O}	159	National Library of Greece, NLG 2112	Athens	Greece	CSNTM
ℓ 1235	14th	†Gospels^{esk}	αω P^{O}	159	National Library of Greece, NLG 2112	Athens	Greece	CSNTM
ℓ 1236	13th	Gospels^{e}	αω	295	National Library of Greece, NLG 4173	Athens	Greece	
ℓ 1237	12th	Gospels	αω	189	Center for Slavic & Byzantine Studies, D. gr. 133	Sofia	Bulgaria	
ℓ 1238	11th/12th	Gospels	αω	233	Center for Slavic & Byzantine Studies, D. gr. 204	Sofia	Bulgaria	
ℓ 1239	14th	Gospels	αω	128	Center for Slavic & Byzantine Studies, D. gr. 337	Sofia	Bulgaria	
ℓ 1240	11th	Gospels	αω	?	National Historical Museum, Gr. 1	Sofia	Bulgaria	
ℓ 1241	14th	Gospels	αω	314	Center for Slavic & Byzantine Studies, D. gr. 054	Sofia	Bulgaria	
ℓ 1242	12th	Apostles	αω	213	Center for Slavic & Byzantine Studies, D. gr. 091	Sofia	Bulgaria	
ℓ 1243	13th	Apostles	αω	?	Owner Unknown			
ℓ 1244	13th	Gospels	αω	?	Owner Unknown			
ℓ 1245	14th	Gospels	αω	190	Center for Slavic & Byzantine Studies, D. gr. 092	Sofia	Bulgaria	
ℓ 1246	13th	Apostles	αω	?	Owner Unknown			
ℓ 1247	13th	Gospels	αω	?	Owner Unknown			
ℓ 1248	11th	Gospels	αω	210	Center for Slavic & Byzantine Studies, D. gr. 235	Sofia	Bulgaria	
ℓ 1249	11th	†Gospels^{e}	αω	189	Center for Slavic & Byzantine Studies, D. gr. 228	Sofia	Bulgaria	
ℓ 1250	13th	Apostles	αω	139	Center for Slavic & Byzantine Studies, D. gr. 293	Sofia	Bulgaria	
ℓ 1251	13th	Apostles	αω	101	Center for Slavic & Byzantine Studies, D. gr. 214	Sofia	Bulgaria	
ℓ 1252	11th	Apostles	αω	133	Center for Slavic & Byzantine Studies, D. gr. 165	Sofia	Bulgaria	
ℓ 1253	16th	Apostles	αω	365	Center for Slavic & Byzantine Studies, D. gr. 264	Sofia	Bulgaria	
ℓ 1254	16th	Apostles	αω	134	Center for Slavic & Byzantine Studies, D. gr. 304	Sofia	Bulgaria	
ℓ 1255	16th	Apostles	αω	302	Center for Slavic & Byzantine Studies, D. gr. 263	Sofia	Bulgaria	
ℓ 1256	13th	Gospels^{esk}	αω	186	University Library, Gr. 73	Uppsala	Sweden	UU
ℓ 1257	13th	Gospels	αω	?	Owner Unknown			
ℓ 1258	11th	Apostles	αω	227	Center for Slavic & Byzantine Studies, D. gr. 216	Sofia	Bulgaria	
ℓ 1259	12th	†Gospels^{e}	αω	123	University of Birmingham Cadbury Research Library, Braithwaite 4	Birmingham	United Kingdom	
[ℓ 1260]								
ℓ 1261	11th	Gospels^{esk}	αω	319	National Library of Turkey, Gr. 03	Ankara	Turkey	
ℓ 1262	11th	†Gospels	αω	250	National Library of Turkey, Gr. 06	Ankara	Turkey	
ℓ 1263	17th	Apostles	αω	133	Owner Unknown			
ℓ 1264	13th	†Gospels^{esk}	αω	133	Queriniana Library, A. III. 10	Brescia	Italy	
ℓ 1265	1257	Gospels^{e}	αω	209	Sainte-Geneviève Library, A. III. 12	Paris	France	
ℓ 1266	12th	†Gospels^{esk}	αω	462	Queriniana Library, D. II. 14	Brescia	Italy	
ℓ 1267	11th	Gospels^{P}	ΑΩ	8	Saint Catherine's Monastery, Harris App. 12; N. E. Sp. MG 8	Sinai	Egypt	CSNTM
ℓ 1268	11th	Gospels^{P}	ΑΩ	2	Saint Catherine's Monastery, Harris App. 13	Sinai	Egypt	CSNTM
ℓ 1269	10th	Gospels^{P}	ΑΩ	6	Saint Catherine's Monastery, Harris App. 14	Sinai	Egypt	CSNTM
ℓ 1270	10th	Gospels^{P}	ΑΩ	2	Saint Catherine's Monastery, Harris App. 15	Sinai	Egypt	CSNTM
[ℓ 1271]								
ℓ 1272	10th	Gospels^{P}	ΑΩ P^{U}	1	Saint Catherine's Monastery, Harris App. 19	Sinai	Egypt	CSNTM
[ℓ 1273]								
ℓ 1274	11th	Gospels^{esk}	αω	226	Owner Unknown			
ℓ 1275	12th	†Gospels^{e}	αω	218	Historical Archives, 2	Rhodos	Greece	
ℓ 1276	9th	Gospels^{P}	αω P^{U}	5 Frg	Cambridge University Library, Taylor-Schechter Collection 16, 93	Cambridge	United Kingdom	
ℓ 1277	15th	Gospels + Apostles^{sk}	αω	75	Dionysiou Monastery, 319, fol. 245-319	Mount Athos	Greece	INTF
ℓ 1278	16th	Apostles^{e}	αω	190	National Library of Greece, 2113	Athens	Greece	
ℓ 1279	11th	Apostles^{e}	αω	253	St. Panteleimon Monastery, 86	Mount Athos	Greece	
ℓ 1280	1474	Apostles^{e}	αω	223	National Library of Greece, NLG 2117	Athens	Greece	CSNTM
ℓ 1281	1454	Apostles^{e}	αω	399	Saint Catherine's Monastery, Gr. 296	Sinai	Egypt	CSNTM
ℓ 1282	1515	Apostles^{e}	αω	326	Saint Catherine's Monastery, Gr. 297	Sinai	Egypt	CSNTM
ℓ 1283	1551	Apostles^{e}	αω	292	Saint Catherine's Monastery, Gr. 298	Sinai	Egypt	CSNTM
ℓ 1284	16th	Apostles^{e}	αω	205	Saint Catherine's Monastery, Gr. 299	Sinai	Egypt	CSNTM
ℓ 1285	14th	Apostles^{Lit}	αω	55	Exarchist Monastery of Saint Mary, G. b. 18	Grottaferrata	Italy	
ℓ 1286	11th	Apostles^{P}	αω	1	Exarchist Monastery of Saint Mary, A. d. 5, fol. 162	Grottaferrata	Italy	
ℓ 1287	13th	Apostles^{Lit}	αω P^{O}	36	Exarchist Monastery of Saint Mary, A. d. 6	Grottaferrata	Italy	
ℓ 1288	12th	Apostles^{Lit}	αω	118	Exarchist Monastery of Saint Mary, A. d. 9	Grottaferrata	Italy	
ℓ 1289	1544	Apostles^{sel}	αω	18	Vatican Library, Reg. gr. 70	Vatican City	Vatican City	
ℓ 1290	12th	Apostles^{e}	αω	97	Panagia Hozoviotissa Monastery	Amorgos	Greece	
ℓ 1291	14th	†Apostles^{e}	αω	194	Patriarchate of Jerusalem, Epiph. of the Jordan 1	Jerusalem	Israel	CSNTM
ℓ 1292	14th	†Apostles^{esk}	αω	75	Patriarchate of Jerusalem, Epiph. of the Jordan 6	Jerusalem	Israel	CSNTM
ℓ 1293	15th	†Apostles^{e}	αω	90	Patriarchate of Jerusalem, Epiph. of the Jordan 7	Jerusalem	Israel	CSNTM
ℓ 1294	14th	Apostles^{esk}	αω	296	Patriarchate of Jerusalem, Taphu 285	Jerusalem	Israel	CSNTM
ℓ 1295	13th	Apostles^{esk}	αω	271	Patriarchate of Jerusalem, Saba 85	Jerusalem	Israel	CSNTM
ℓ 1296	1556	Apostles^{e}	αω	295	Patriarchate of Jerusalem, Saba 145	Jerusalem	Israel	CSNTM
ℓ 1296	1556	Apostles^{e}	αω	2	Russian National Library, Gr. 404	Saint Petersburg	Russia	
ℓ 1297	1421	Apostles^{e}	αω	245	Patriarchate of Jerusalem, Saba 222	Jerusalem	Israel	CSNTM
ℓ 1298	11th	Apostles^{esk}	αω	183	Patriarchate of Jerusalem, Saba 266	Jerusalem	Israel	CSNTM
ℓ 1299	15th	Apostles^{e}	αω	389	Patriarchate of Jerusalem, Saba 296	Jerusalem	Israel	CSNTM
ℓ 1300	11th	†Apostles^{esk}	αω	156	Patriarchate of Jerusalem, Stavru 67	Jerusalem	Israel	CSNTM

[top]

=== Lectionaries 1301–1400 ===
#	Date	Contents	Script	Pages	Institution	City, State	Country	Images
ℓ 1301	14th	Apostles^{Lit}	αω	155	Jagiellonian Library, Graec. fol. 48. IV	Kraków	Poland	
ℓ 1302	14th	Apostles^{P}	αω	2	Jagiellonian Library, Graec. qu. 13	Kraków	Poland	
ℓ 1303	14th	Apostles^{Lit}	αω	?	National Library of Greece	Athens	Greece	
ℓ 1304	14th	Apostles^{e}	αω	267	Monastery of Saint John the Theologian, 13	Patmos	Greece	
ℓ 1305	16th	†Apostles^{e}	αω	258	Monastery of Saint John the Theologian, 640	Patmos	Greece	
[ℓ 1306]								
ℓ 1307	15th	Apostles^{esk}	αω	146	National Library of Greece, NLG 116	Athens	Greece	CSNTM
ℓ 1308	15th	Apostles^{esk}	αω	76	National Library of Greece, NLG 144	Athens	Greece	CSNTM
ℓ 1309	15th	†Apostles^{esk}	αω	124	Koutloumousiou Monastery, 372	Mount Athos	Greece	
ℓ 1310	15th	Gospels + Apostles^{Lit}	αω	119	Greek Orthodox Patriarchate, 112	Alexandria	Egypt	INTF
ℓ 1311	12th	Apostles^{P}	αω	3	State Historical Museum, Sinod. gr. 485 (Vlad. 008) fol. 196-198	Moscow	Russia	
ℓ 1312	13th	Apostles^{Lit}	αω	201	National Library, Grec 308	Paris	France	BnF
ℓ 1313	14th	Apostles^{P}	αω	1	National Library, Grec 922, fol. A	Paris	France	BnF
ℓ 1314	15th	Apostles^{P}	αω	2	National Library, Supplement Grec 804, fol. 88-89	Paris	France	INTF
ℓ 1315	12th	Apostles^{P}	αω	4	National Library of Greece, NLG 294	Athens	Greece	CSNTM
ℓ 1316	11th	Apostles^{P}	αω P^{U}	2	Exarchist Monastery of Saint Mary, G. b. 21, fol. 4.5	Grottaferrata	Italy	
ℓ 1317	9th	Gospels^{P}	ΑΩ P^{U}	2	British Library, Add MS 36823, fol. 17. 18	London	United Kingdom	BL
ℓ 1318	13th	Gospels^{P}	αω	2	Congregational Library & Archives, MS Pratt 115	Boston, MA	United States	
ℓ 1319	14th	Gospels^{P}	αω	4	British Library, Add MS 25881 (pages 400-403)	London	United Kingdom	
ℓ 1320	10th	Gospels^{P}	ΑΩ	4	Dionysiou Monastery, 23, fol. 1-2, 220-221	Mount Athos	Greece	
ℓ 1321	14th	Gospels^{P}	αω	1	National Library of Greece	Athens	Greece	
ℓ 1322	13th	Gospels^{P}	αω	1	National and University Library, Ms. 1.901	Strasbourg	France	INTF
ℓ 1323	13th	Gospels^{P}	αω	5	Jagiellonian Library, Graec. fol. 45. VI	Kraków	Poland	
ℓ 1324	12th	Gospels^{P}	αω	2	Zoodochos Pigi Monastery (Hagias), 74 (Einband)	Andros	Greece	
ℓ 1325	1600	Gospels^{Lit-P}	αω	8	Zograf Monastery, 27	Mount Athos	Greece	
ℓ 1326	12th	Gospels^{P}	αω	1	Patriarchate of Jerusalem, Saba 704, 10	Jerusalem	Israel	CSNTM
ℓ 1327	12th	Gospels^{P}	αω	2	Patriarchate of Jerusalem, Saba 704, 11	Jerusalem	Israel	CSNTM
ℓ 1328	10th	Gospels^{P}	ΑΩ	1	Greek Orthodox Patriarchate, 34	Alexandria	Egypt	
ℓ 1329	13th	Gospels^{P}	αω	4	Greek Orthodox Patriarchate, 24 (Einband)	Alexandria	Egypt	
ℓ 1330	1601	Gospels + Apostles^{Lit}	αω	213	Greek Orthodox Patriarchate, 217	Alexandria	Egypt	
ℓ 1331	16th	Gospels + Apostles^{Lit}	αω	177	Greek Orthodox Patriarchate, 46	Alexandria	Egypt	
ℓ 1332	14th	Gospels^{P}	αω	2	Greek Orthodox Patriarchate, 115	Alexandria	Egypt	
ℓ 1333	15th	Apostles^{e}	αω	329	Greek Orthodox Patriarchate, 170	Alexandria	Egypt	
ℓ 1334	13th	†Apostles^{e}	αω	87	Greek Orthodox Patriarchate, 134	Alexandria	Egypt	
ℓ 1335	14th	Gospels^{P}	αω	8	Greek Orthodox Patriarchate	Alexandria	Egypt	
ℓ 1336	15th	Gospels + Apostles^{Lit}	αω	92	Greek Orthodox Patriarchate, 457	Alexandria	Egypt	
ℓ 1337	12th	Gospels^{P}	αω	2	Greek Orthodox Patriarchate, 78	Alexandria	Egypt	
ℓ 1338	16th	Apostles^{P}	αω	1	Greek Orthodox Patriarchate, 218	Alexandria	Egypt	
ℓ 1339	10th	Gospels^{P}	ΑΩ	2	Greek Orthodox Patriarchate, 110	Alexandria	Egypt	
ℓ 1340	12th	Gospels^{P}	αω	2	Greek Orthodox Patriarchate, 42	Alexandria	Egypt	
ℓ 1341	10th	Gospels^{P}	ΑΩ	1	Greek Orthodox Patriarchate, 327	Alexandria	Egypt	
ℓ 1342	12th	Gospels^{P}	αω	4	Greek Orthodox Patriarchate, 380	Alexandria	Egypt	
ℓ 1343	13th	Gospels + Apostles^{Lit}	αω	151	Greek Orthodox Patriarchate, 157	Alexandria	Egypt	
ℓ 1344	14th	Gospels^{Lit}	αω	48	Greek Orthodox Patriarchate, 104	Alexandria	Egypt	
ℓ 1345	9th	Gospels^{PsO}	ΑΩ	3	Herzog August Library, Codd. Weissenburg. 86, fol. 216-218	Wolfenbüttel	Germany	INTF
ℓ 1346	10th	Gospels^{PsO}	ΑΩ	318	Bodleian Library, Auct. D. 4. 1	Oxford	United Kingdom	
ℓ 1347	6th	Gospels^{PsO}	ΑΩ	404	Capitol Library, 1	Verona	Italy	
ℓ 1348	7th	Gospels^{PsO}	ΑΩ	223	Central Library, RP 1	Zurich	Switzerland	
ℓ 1349	9th	Gospels^{PsO}	ΑΩ	171	Abbey library of Saint Gall, Cod. Sang. 17	St. Gallen	Switzerland	e-codices
ℓ 1350	9th	Gospels^{PsO}	ΑΩ	318	Russian State Library, Φ. 201 18B (gr. 3)	Moscow	Russia	
ℓ 1351	9th	Gospels^{PsO}	ΑΩ	66	Library of the Arsenal, 8407	Paris	France	INTF
ℓ 1352	9th	Gospels^{PsO}	ΑΩ	303	Turin National University Library, B.VII.30	Turin	Italy	INTF
[ℓ 1353]=ℓ 962								
ℓ 1354	6th	Gospels^{P}	ΑΩ	1	Cambridge University Library, Add. Mss. 1875	Cambridge	United Kingdom	
ℓ 1355	9th	Gospels^{P}	ΑΩ	1	Bodleian Library, Gr. liturg. c. 1	Oxford	United Kingdom	
ℓ 1356	11th	†Apostles^{esk}	αω	131	Saint Catherine's Monastery, Gr. 284	Sinai	Egypt	CSNTM
ℓ 1357	15th	Apostles^{P}	αω	20	British Library, MS Harley 5731, fol. 183-202	London	United Kingdom	BL
ℓ 1358	9th	Gospels^{P}	ΑΩ	3	National Library, Grec 290, fol. 1-3	Paris	France	INTF
ℓ 1359	14th	Gospels + Apostles^{sel}	αω	(scroll)	Esphigmenou Monastery, 34	Mount Athos	Greece	
[ℓ 1360]	14th	Gospels + Apostles^{Lit-P}	αω	244	Manuscript destroyed			
ℓ 1361	18th	Gospels^{Lit}	αω	?	Esphigmenou Monastery, 237	Mount Athos	Greece	
ℓ 1362	17th	Gospels + Apostles^{Lit}	αω	55	Docheiariou Monastery, 218	Mount Athos	Greece	
ℓ 1363	16th	Gospels + Apostles^{Lit}	αω	69	Docheiariou Monastery, 259	Mount Athos	Greece	
ℓ 1364	12th	†Apostles^{e}	αω	227	Saint Catherine's Monastery, Gr. 285	Sinai	Egypt	CSNTM
ℓ 1365	12th	Apostles^{esk}	αω	276	Saint Catherine's Monastery, Gr. 288	Sinai	Egypt	CSNTM
ℓ 1366	12th	Apostles^{e}	αω	214	Russian State Library, Φ. 173 I 281 (gr. 23)	Moscow	Russia	
ℓ 1367	14th	Apostles^{P}	αω	65	Russian State Library, Φ. 173 I 370 (gr. 177)	Moscow	Russia	
ℓ 1368	11th	†Gospels^{esk}	αω	329	State Historical Museum, Sinod. gr. 470	Moscow	Russia	
ℓ 1369	1371	Gospels^{e}	αω	328	Russian State Library, Φ. 304 III 26	Moscow	Russia	
ℓ 1370	13th	†Gospels^{esk}	αω	147	Russian National Library, Gr. 510	Saint Petersburg	Russia	
ℓ 1371	14th	Gospels + Apostles^{e}	αω	271	Monastery of Saint John the Theologian, 98	Patmos	Greece	
ℓ 1372	14th	Gospels^{P}	αω	2	American Bible Society	Philadelphia, PA	United States	CSNTM
ℓ 1372	14th	Gospels^{P}	αω	15	Trinity College, Watkinson Library Ms. 2	Hartford, CT	United States	CSNTM
ℓ 1373	12th	†Gospels^{e}	αω	219	Trinity College, Watkinson Library Ms. 1	Hartford, CT	United States	
ℓ 1374	12th	Gospels^{esk}	αω	191	National Library of Greece, 72	Athens	Greece	CSNTM
ℓ 1375	10th	Gospels^{P}	ΑΩ	1	Owner Unknown			
ℓ 1376	9th/10th	Gospels^{P}	αω	4	Pechersk Lavra, 2278-2279; KV-1328, KN-1504	Kiev	Ukraine	
ℓ 1377	14th	Gospels + Apostles^{P}	αω P^{O}	2	Vernadsky National Library, F. 301 (KDA), 20 p	Kiev	Ukraine	
ℓ 1378	11th	Gospels^{P}	αω	2	Pechersk Lavra, 2274; KV-1326, KN-1502	Kiev	Ukraine	
ℓ 1379	10th/11th	Gospels^{P}	αω	15	Vernadsky National Library, F. 301 (KDA), 22 l	Kiev	Ukraine	
ℓ 1380	11th	Gospels^{e}	αω	285	Vernadsky National Library, F. 301 (KDA), 23 l	Kiev	Ukraine	
ℓ 1381	10th/11th	†Gospels^{e}	αω	250	Vernadsky National Library, F. 301 (KDA), 21 l	Kiev	Ukraine	
ℓ 1382	13th	Gospels^{esk}	αω	123	Vernadsky National Library, F. 301 (KDA), 24 l	Kiev	Ukraine	
ℓ 1383	11th/12th	†Gospels^{e}	αω	99	Russian State Archives, F. 201, Nr. 191	Moscow	Russia	
ℓ 1384	10th	Gospels^{P}	ΑΩ	2	Russian State Library, Φ. 270 70 (gr. 166.3)	Moscow	Russia	
ℓ 1385	10th	Gospels^{P}	ΑΩ	2	Russian State Library, Φ. 270 70 (gr. 166.4)	Moscow	Russia	
ℓ 1386	10th	Gospels^{P}	ΑΩ	2	State Historical Museum, Sinod. gr. 313 (Vlad. 185) fol. 238.239	Moscow	Russia	
ℓ 1387	16th	Gospels^{Lit}	αω	135	State Historical Museum, Sinod. gr. 486 (Vlad. 271)	Moscow	Russia	
ℓ 1388	14th	Gospels + Apostles^{Lit}	αω	199	State Historical Museum, Sinod. gr. 217 (Vlad. 282)	Moscow	Russia	
ℓ 1389	12th	Gospels^{P}	αω	3	State Historical Museum, Sinod. gr. 191 (Vlad. 341), fol. A 1.133	Moscow	Russia	
ℓ 1390	11th	Gospels^{sel}	αω	114	State Historical Museum, Sinod. gr. 511	Moscow	Russia	
ℓ 1391	1033	Gospels^{e}	αω	398	Russian National Library, Ф. № 573/ Б I 2	Saint Petersburg	Russia	
ℓ 1392	9th	Gospels^{P}	ΑΩ	3	Russian National Library, Ф. № 573/ Б I 5 (fol. 1-303: l 1552)	Saint Petersburg	Russia	
ℓ 1393	12th	†Gospels^{esk}	αω	160	Russian National Library, Ф. № 573/ Б I 7	Saint Petersburg	Russia	
ℓ 1394	11th	†Gospels^{esk}	αω	244	Russian National Library, Ф. № 573/ Б I 6	Saint Petersburg	Russia	
ℓ 1395	9th	John 19:14-20	ΑΩ	1	Russian National Library, Ф. № 906 /Gr. 25	Saint Petersburg	Russia	INTF
[ℓ 1396]	12th	Apostles^{e}	αω	186	Manuscript destroyed			
ℓ 1397	9th	Gospels^{P}	ΑΩ	1	Russian National Library, Gr. 194	Saint Petersburg	Russia	
[ℓ 1398]								
[ℓ 1399]								
[ℓ 1400]								

[top]

=== Lectionaries 1401–1500 ===
#	Date	Contents	Script	Pages	Institution	City, State	Country	Images
ℓ 1401 + [ℓ 857]	1039	Gospels^{esk}	αω	206	Saint Catherine's Monastery, Gr. 223	Sinai	Egypt	CSNTM
ℓ 1401 + [ℓ 857]	1039	Gospels^{esk}	αω	1	Russian National Library, Gr. 289	Saint Petersburg	Russia	
[ℓ 1402]								
ℓ 1403	11th	Gospels^{P}	ΑΩ	1	Russian National Library, Gr. 293	Saint Petersburg	Russia	
ℓ 1404	10th	Gospels^{P}	ΑΩ	2	Russian National Library, Gr. 294	Saint Petersburg	Russia	
ℓ 1405 + [ℓ 868]	1119	Gospels^{esk}	αω	173	Saint Catherine's Monastery, Gr. 234	Sinai	Egypt	CSNTM
ℓ 1405 + [ℓ 868]	1119	Gospels^{esk}	αω	1	Russian National Library, Gr. 297	Saint Petersburg	Russia	
[ℓ 1406]								
[ℓ 1407]								
ℓ 1408 + [ℓ 999]	12th	Gospels^{esk}	αω	180	Patriarchate of Jerusalem, Saba 64	Jerusalem	Israel	CSNTM
[ℓ 1409]								
ℓ 1410 + [ℓ 1005]	1274	Gospels^{esk}	αω	126	Patriarchate of Jerusalem, Saba 153	Jerusalem	Israel	CSNTM
ℓ 1410 + [ℓ 1005]	1274	Gospels^{esk}	αω	2	Russian National Library, Gr. 309	Saint Petersburg	Russia	
[ℓ 1411]								
ℓ 1412 + [ℓ 1018]	13th	†Gospels^{esk}	αω	126	Patriarchate of Jerusalem, Saba 356	Jerusalem	Israel	CSNTM
ℓ 1412 + [ℓ 1018]	13th	†Gospels^{esk}	αω	2	Russian National Library, Gr. 312	Saint Petersburg	Russia	
[ℓ 1413]								
[ℓ 1414]								
[ℓ 1415]								
ℓ 1416	13th	1 Peter 1:1-9, 13-19; 2 Peter 2:11-24	αω	2	Russian National Library, Gr. 325	Saint Petersburg	Russia	INTF
ℓ 1417	10th	Gospels^{P}	αω P^{U}	8	Russian National Library, Gr. 367	Saint Petersburg	Russia	
[ℓ 1418]								
ℓ 1419 + [ℓ 1016]	12th	Gospels^{esk}	αω	94	Patriarchate of Jerusalem, Saba 246	Jerusalem	Israel	CSNTM
ℓ 1419 + [ℓ 1016]	12th	Gospels^{esk}	αω	8	Russian National Library, Gr. 399	Saint Petersburg	Russia	
[ℓ 1420]								
[ℓ 1421]=ℓ 1008								
[ℓ 1422]								
[ℓ 1423]								
ℓ 1424 + [ℓ 1011]	1634	Gospels + Apostles^{sk}	αω	335	Patriarchate of Jerusalem, Saba 203	Jerusalem	Israel	CSNTM
ℓ 1424 + [ℓ 1011]	1634	Gospels + Apostles^{sk}	αω	2	Russian National Library, Gr. 406	Saint Petersburg	Russia	
ℓ 1425	12th	†Gospels^{sk}	αω	113	Russian National Library, Gr. 504	Saint Petersburg	Russia	
ℓ 1426	1180	†Gospels^{esk}	αω	152	Russian National Library, Gr. 512	Saint Petersburg	Russia	
ℓ 1427	14th	†Gospels^{esk}	αω	172	Russian National Library, Gr. 516	Saint Petersburg	Russia	
ℓ 1428	13th	†Apostles^{e}	αω	305	Russian National Library, Gr. 542	Saint Petersburg	Russia	
ℓ 1429	10th	Gospels^{P}	ΑΩ P^{U}	14	Russian National Library, Gr. 645	Saint Petersburg	Russia	
ℓ 1430	11th	Gospels + Apostles^{P}	αω	82	Russian National Library, Gr. 656	Saint Petersburg	Russia	
ℓ 1431	15th	Gospels + Apostles^{Lit}	αω	238	Russian Academy of Sciences Historical Institute, Inostr. Q N° 016	Saint Petersburg	Russia	
ℓ 1432	13th	Gospels^{P}	αω	2	Russian Academy of Sciences Historical Institute, Inostr. F N° 005 (Frg A)	Saint Petersburg	Russia	
ℓ 1433	12th/13th	Gospels	αω	173	National Archives of Albania, Kod. Br. 22	Tirana	Albania	CSNTM
ℓ 1434	14th	Gospels	αω	151	National Archives of Albania, Kod. Br. 9	Tirana	Albania	CSNTM
[ℓ 1435]=0234								
ℓ 1436	15th	Gospels + Apostles^{e}	αω	211	Saint Catherine's Monastery, Gr. 268	Sinai	Egypt	CSNTM
ℓ 1437	14th	Gospels^{k-K}	αω	499	Patriarchate of Jerusalem, Taphu 132	Jerusalem	Israel	CSNTM
ℓ 1438	12th	Gospels^{P}	αω	4	Patriarchate of Jerusalem, Taphu 49	Jerusalem	Israel	CSNTM
ℓ 1439	12th	†Apostles^{esk}	αω	155	Saint Catherine's Monastery, Gr. 289	Sinai	Egypt	CSNTM
ℓ 1440	1251	Apostles^{e}	αω	230	Saint Catherine's Monastery, Gr. 290	Sinai	Egypt	CSNTM
ℓ 1441	13th	Apostles^{e}	αω	213	Saint Catherine's Monastery, Gr. 291	Sinai	Egypt	CSNTM
ℓ 1442	11th	Apostles^{esk}	αω	159	Saint Catherine's Monastery, Gr. 292	Sinai	Egypt	CSNTM
ℓ 1443	11th	Apostles^{esk}	ΑΩ	145	Saint Catherine's Monastery, Gr. 293	Sinai	Egypt	CSNTM
ℓ 1443	11th	Apostles^{esk}	ΑΩ	2	Russian National Library, Gr. 318	Saint Petersburg	Russia	
[ℓ 1444]								
[ℓ 1445]	16th	†Gospels	αω	136	Manuscript destroyed			
[ℓ 1446]	12th	Gospels^{esk}	αω	215	Manuscript destroyed			
ℓ 1447	12th	Gospels^{e}	αω	387	Mega Spileo Monastery, 17	Kalavryta	Greece	
[ℓ 1448]	1269	Gospels^{e}	αω	193	Manuscript destroyed			
[ℓ 1449]	12th	Gospels	αω	205	Manuscript destroyed			
[ℓ 1450]	1172	Gospels^{esk}	αω	177	Manuscript destroyed			
[ℓ 1451]	15th	†Gospels^{e}	αω	270	Manuscript destroyed			
[ℓ 1452]	11th	Gospels^{e}	αω	314	Manuscript destroyed			
[ℓ 1453]	11th	Gospels^{esk}	αω	222	Manuscript destroyed			
[ℓ 1454]	12th	†Gospels^{e}	αω	261	Manuscript destroyed			
[ℓ 1455]	11th	Gospels^{esk}	αω	150	Manuscript destroyed			
[ℓ 1456]	11th	Gospels^{esk}	αω	259	Manuscript destroyed			
[ℓ 1457]	12th	Gospels + Apostles^{Lit}	αω	155	Manuscript destroyed			
[ℓ 1458]	15th	Gospels^{esk}	αω	355	Manuscript destroyed			
[ℓ 1459]	16th	Gospels^{esk}	αω	298	Manuscript destroyed			
[ℓ 1460]	15th	†Gospels^{esk}	αω	314	Manuscript destroyed			
[ℓ 1461]	15th	†Gospels^{e}	αω	195	Manuscript destroyed			
ℓ 1462	1170	†Gospels^{e}	αω	148	Museum of Ecclesiastical Art, 1	Sparta	Greece	
ℓ 1463	1706	Gospels^{e}	αω	337	Museum of Ecclesiastical Art, 3	Sparta	Greece	
ℓ 1464	1652	Gospels^{e}	αω	338	Museum of Ecclesiastical Art, 4	Sparta	Greece	
ℓ 1465	17th	Gospels^{esk}	αω	190	Museum of Ecclesiastical Art, 28	Sparta	Greece	
ℓ 1466	18th	†Gospels^{esk}	αω	159	Museum of Ecclesiastical Art, 47	Sparta	Greece	
ℓ 1467	11th	Gospels + Apostles^{Lit}	αω	217	Patriarchate of Jerusalem, Stavru 15	Jerusalem	Israel	CSNTM
ℓ 1468	13th	Gospels + Apostles^{Lit}	αω	45	Patriarchate of Jerusalem, Saba 143, fol. 80-124	Jerusalem	Israel	CSNTM
ℓ 1469	15th	Gospels + Apostles^{Lit}	αω	137	Patriarchate of Jerusalem, Saba 382	Jerusalem	Israel	
ℓ 1470	14th	Gospels + Apostles^{k}	αω	287	Saint Catherine's Monastery, Gr. 263	Sinai	Egypt	CSNTM
ℓ 1471	15th	Gospels + Apostles^{k}	αω	158	Saint Catherine's Monastery, Gr. 264	Sinai	Egypt	CSNTM
[ℓ 1472]								
ℓ 1473	1582	Gospels + Apostles^{P}	αω	105	Manuscript destroyed			
ℓ 1474	1193	Gospels	αω	276	Manuscript destroyed			
ℓ 1475	16th	Gospels + Apostles^{Lit}	αω	83	Church of Protaton, 61	Mount Athos	Greece	
ℓ 1476	9th	†Gospels^{esk}	ΑΩ	345	St. Panteleimon Monastery	Mount Athos	Greece	
ℓ 1477	1597	Gospels + Apostles^{Lit}	αω	172	St. Panteleimon Monastery, 1212	Mount Athos	Greece	
ℓ 1478	14th	†Gospels^{esk}	αω	92	University Library, Ms. 5512	St. Andrews	United Kingdom	CSNTM
ℓ 1479	11th	Gospels^{P}	αω	2	School, 69	Mileä	Greece	
ℓ 1480	17th	Gospels^{P}	αω	27	Owner Unknown			
ℓ 1481	12th	†Gospels^{e}	αω	296	Russian Academy of Sciences Historical Institute, RAIK 077	Saint Petersburg	Russia	
ℓ 1482	12th	†Gospels^{esk}	αω	?	Owner Unknown			
ℓ 1483	12th	†Gospels^{sk}	αω	123	Russian Academy of Sciences Historical Institute, RAIK 080	Saint Petersburg	Russia	
ℓ 1484	12th	Gospels^{P}	αω	10	Russian Academy of Sciences Historical Institute, RAIK 081	Saint Petersburg	Russia	
ℓ 1485	10th	Gospels^{P}	ΑΩ	2	Russian Academy of Sciences Historical Institute, RAIK 003 + 067	Saint Petersburg	Russia	INTF
ℓ 1486	17th	†Gospels^{e}	αω	207	Russian Academy of Sciences Historical Institute, RAIK 088	Saint Petersburg	Russia	
ℓ 1487	15th	†Apostles^{e}	αω	124	Russian Academy of Sciences Historical Institute, RAIK 091	Saint Petersburg	Russia	
ℓ 1488	12th	Gospels^{esk}	αω	130	Russian Academy of Sciences Historical Institute, RAIK 078	Saint Petersburg	Russia	
[ℓ 1489]								
ℓ 1490	12th	Apostles^{Lit}	αω	192	British Library, Add MS 36600	London	United Kingdom	
ℓ 1491	11th	†Gospels^{esk}	αω	219	British Library, Add MS 36751	London	United Kingdom	BL
ℓ 1492	11th	†Gospels^{esk}	αω	229	British Library, Add MS 37004	London	United Kingdom	BL
ℓ 1493	11th	Gospels^{esk}	αω	147	British Library, Add MS 37005	London	United Kingdom	BL
ℓ 1494	12th	Gospels^{e}	αω	195	British Library, Add MS 37006	London	United Kingdom	BL
ℓ 1495	12th	Gospels^{esk}	αω	318	British Library, Add MS 37007	London	United Kingdom	BL
ℓ 1496	1413	Gospels^{e}	αω	397	British Library, Add MS 37008	London	United Kingdom	BL
ℓ 1497	14th	Gospels^{e}	αω	365	British Library, Egerton MS 2808	London	United Kingdom	INTF
ℓ 1498	1299	Gospels^{esk}	αω	300?	Owner Unknown			
ℓ 1499	11th	†Gospels^{e}	αω	267	John Rylands University Library of Manchester, Gr. Ms. 9	Manchester	United Kingdom	
ℓ 1500	12th/13th	Gospels^{PsO}	αω	284	John Rylands University Library of Manchester, Gr. Ms. 11	Manchester	United Kingdom	

[top]

== See also ==
Lists

- Categories of New Testament manuscripts
- List of New Testament papyri
- List of New Testament uncials
- List of New Testament minuscules
- List of New Testament Latin manuscripts

Articles

- Novum Testamentum Graece
- Biblical manuscript
- Palaeography
- Textual criticism

== Bibliography ==
- Dr. Peter M. Head. The Early Greek Bible Manuscript Project: New Testament Lectionary Manuscripts.
- K. Aland, M. Welte, B. Köster, K. Junack, Kurzgefasste Liste der griechischen Handschriften des Neuen Testaments, Walter de Gruyter, Berlin, New York 1994, pp. 219 ff.
- Aland, Kurt; Barbara Aland (1995). The Text of the New Testament: An Introduction to the Critical Editions and to the Theory and Practice of Modern Textual Criticism. Translated by Erroll F. Rhodes (2nd ed.). Grand Rapids, Michigan: William B. Eerdmans Publishing Co. ISBN 0-8028-4098-1.
- Seid, Timothy. "A Table of Greek Manuscripts". Interpreting Ancient Manuscripts. Retrieved June 22, 2007.
- Black M., Aland K., Die alten Übersetzungen des Neuen Testaments, die Kirchenväterzitate und Lektionare: der gegenwärtige Stand ihrer Erforschung und ihre Bedeutung für die griechische Textgeschichte, Wissenschaftliche Beirat des Instituts für neutestamentliche Textforschung, Berlin 1972.
- Carroll D. Osburn, The Greek Lectionaries of the New Testament, in. The Text of the New Testament in Contemporary Research, ed. Bart D. Ehrman and Michael W. Holmes, William B. Eerdmans Publishing Company, Grand Rapids 1995, pp. 61–74.
