= Fire of Rome (192) =

Conflagation in Ancient Rome

In 192 AD, a fire destroyed a large portion of central Rome, including numerous warehouses and at least three libraries on the Palatine Hill and Trajan's Forum. Libraries destroyed included the Palatine library, the Domus Tiberiana library, and the Templum Pacis library. The fire burned for days and spread throughout many sections of the city until it was extinguished by rain. The fire was memorialized by the Roman historians Cassius Dio and Herodian, as well as the physician Galen in his text Peri Alypias, which was lost and then rediscovered in 2005 in a monastery in Thessaloniki; Galen's text illuminated the full intellectual loss and destruction due to the fire. Other authors and contemporaries of Galen recorded immense losses from the fire, such as the grammarian Philides who lost so many books and manuscripts in the fire that he wasted away from grief and died.

== Background ==
In 192 AD, Rome was still recovering from the lingering effects of the Antonine Plague, which had begun in 160 AD. In a 15-year period, roughly 10% of the empire, an estimated 5–10 million people, died of disease. Although the Antonine Plague had ended by 180, a similar plague-like disease broke out in 189. In the aftermath of this epidemic and under the rule of the emperor Commodus, Galen had become a prominent figure in Roman medicine and society.

== Sources ==
Cassius Dio's account of the fire describes it as a portent that started before the death of Commodus, as does Herodian, who put a greater emphasis on the associated omens and considered the fire to the be the "worst portent of all", given the total destruction of the Templum Pacis, the "largest and most beautiful building in the city", and the entire sacred precinct. The fire reached as far as the north side of the Palatine Hill. Herodian stated that the fire lasted three days and was only extinguished by "a godsend rain".

The fire began at night in a dwelling (although Herodian offers alternative causes of lightning or an earthquake) and spread to the Templum Pacis and then spread to storehouses that contained Egyptian and Arabian wares and objects. The temple of Vesta was also destroyed, which exposed the statue of Pallas Athena until the Vestal Virgins seized it, carried it down the Via Sacra, and relocated it to the imperial palace.

=== Galen ===
Galen's treatise Peri Alypias was composed in response to the 192 AD fire, which helped solidify its date. Galen discussed the fire as a recent event that happened "at the end of winter", "two months" before Galen had planned to move some of his books, which were lost, to Campania. The details of Peri Alypias include a list of surgical tools that Galen owned which were destroyed in the fire, details of daily life under the rule of Commodus, and minutiae of courtly life. Galen himself was not in Rome when the fire occurred.

== Aftermath ==
The fire occurred at the end of the rule of Commodus, whose behaviour was viewed by later historians, including Dio Cassius, as highly transgressive.

Galen wrote that none of his friends had a copy of the two already published bookrolls of Peri Alypias, which had been stored in the warehouses (Latin: horrea) along the Via Sacra, and destroyed. He was encouraged by his followers and supporters to rewrite the treatise entirely and eventually did.

== See also ==
- Antonine Plague
