= P95 =

P95 or p95 may refer to:

- Embraer P-95 Bandeirulha, a maritime patrol aircraft of the Brazilian Air Force
- HMAS Bandolier (P 95), a patrol boat of the Royal Australian Navy
- HMS Virulent (P95), a submarine of the Royal Navy
- Papyrus 95, a biblical manuscript
- Ruger P95, a 1996 pistol model
- P95, a NIOSH air filtration rating
- P95, a state regional road in Latvia
- P95, the 95th percentile
