= List of archives in Albania =

The Declaration of Independence in 1912 and the subsequent formation of the Independent Albanian State created framework conditions for the organizing and safekeeping of documents. For the first time, the assessment of documents and their administration and preservation is reflected in the highest normative act of the state, enacted in the Provisional Kanun of the Vlora Government (22 November 1913).

== List of archives ==
Abbr.	Name of archive	Founded
DPA	General Directorate of Archives	8 June 1949
AQSHF	Central State Film Archive	10 April 1947
—	Presidential Archive	29 June 1993
—	Parliament Archive	15 April 1991
—	Ministry of Foreign Affairs Archive
—	Ministry of Internal Affairs Archive	21 March 1964
AQFA	Armed Forces Archive	21 March 1964
—	Justice System Archive	17 December 2014
—	State Intelligence Service Archive	2 July 1991
AQTN	Technical Construction Archive	26 July 1993
—	Social Insurance Archive	19 November 2004
AIDSSH	Sigurimi Archive	30 March 2015

== History of the archives ==
The first document stored in the Central State Archive, which deals with efforts to create a Central Archive, is the decision dated 2 January 1932 of the High State Council for reviewing the draft-regulation for the registration of important events. In this draft-regulation, it was foreseen the creation of a General State Archive.

=== World War II ===
World War II slowed the initiatives undertaken by state authorities for the creation of a centralized system of archives. During this period, documents and records were preserved and managed by the administration of the institution which they belonged to. This collection of documents and records enabled the creation of a large archival database, which became the foundation of a future Central State Archive.

=== Communism ===
Efforts to create a central archive continued after the war. In 1947, the "Documentary Archive of the Institute" was created at the Institute of Studies. It collected a considerable amount of historical documents kept by state institutions or individuals, thus taking on the attributes of a Central Archive, but not with all the features of such an entity.

The Central State Archive was finally established as a central body, although subordinated to the Institute of Studies, by the Council of Ministers Order No. 21, dated 8 June 1949.

== See also ==
- List of archives
- List of libraries in Albania
- List of museums in Albania
