= Justice System Archive (Albania) =

Arkivi Shtetëror i Sistemit Gjyqësor
- Location: Tirana, Albania
- Type: Archives
- Established: 17 December 2014
- Director: Leonard Busho
- Website: ashsgj.gov.al

The State Archive of the Justice System (Albanian: Arkivi Shtetëror i Sistemit Gjyqësor) is an institution in Albania's Ministry of Justice tasked with maintaining, processing and administering judicial documents which are subject to archiving procedures by the courts.

ASHSGJ ensures the management of court archives and is responsible for the use, maintenance, preservation, transfer and destruction of files, registers and other court documents, as well as providing data access to any concerned subjects.

== See also ==
- List of archives in Albania
