= Albanian Armed Forces Central Archive =

Arkivi Qendror i Forcave të Armatosura
- Location: Tirana, Albania
- Type: Military archive
- Established: 21 March 1964

The Central Archive of the Armed Forces (AQFA) (Albanian: Arkivi Qendror i Forcave të Armatosura) was created by Council of Ministers decree No. 89, dated March 21, 1964.

== History ==
The foundation for the establishment of AQFA was a collection of military documents drafted by the country's political and military formations during the National Liberation War, as well as the activities of the Albanian Armed Forces in the first two decades of the post-war period.

On the day of the Liberation of Tirana, on 17 November 1944, the General Staff of the National Liberation Army, by an order sent to the Army Corps, commanded a commission to be formed by a member of the National Liberation General Council, who would receive handing over all the official documents of the Albanian state, the ministries, the municipalities, the police, the quisling army, and have them safeguarded by the Armed Forces.

These documents constituted the basis for creating a national archive fund, and thereafter the creation of future institutions that would enrich, systematize, maintain, and make use of these documents.

== See also ==
- List of archives in Albania
