= National Library of Albania =

- Biblioteka Kombëtare e Shqipërisë

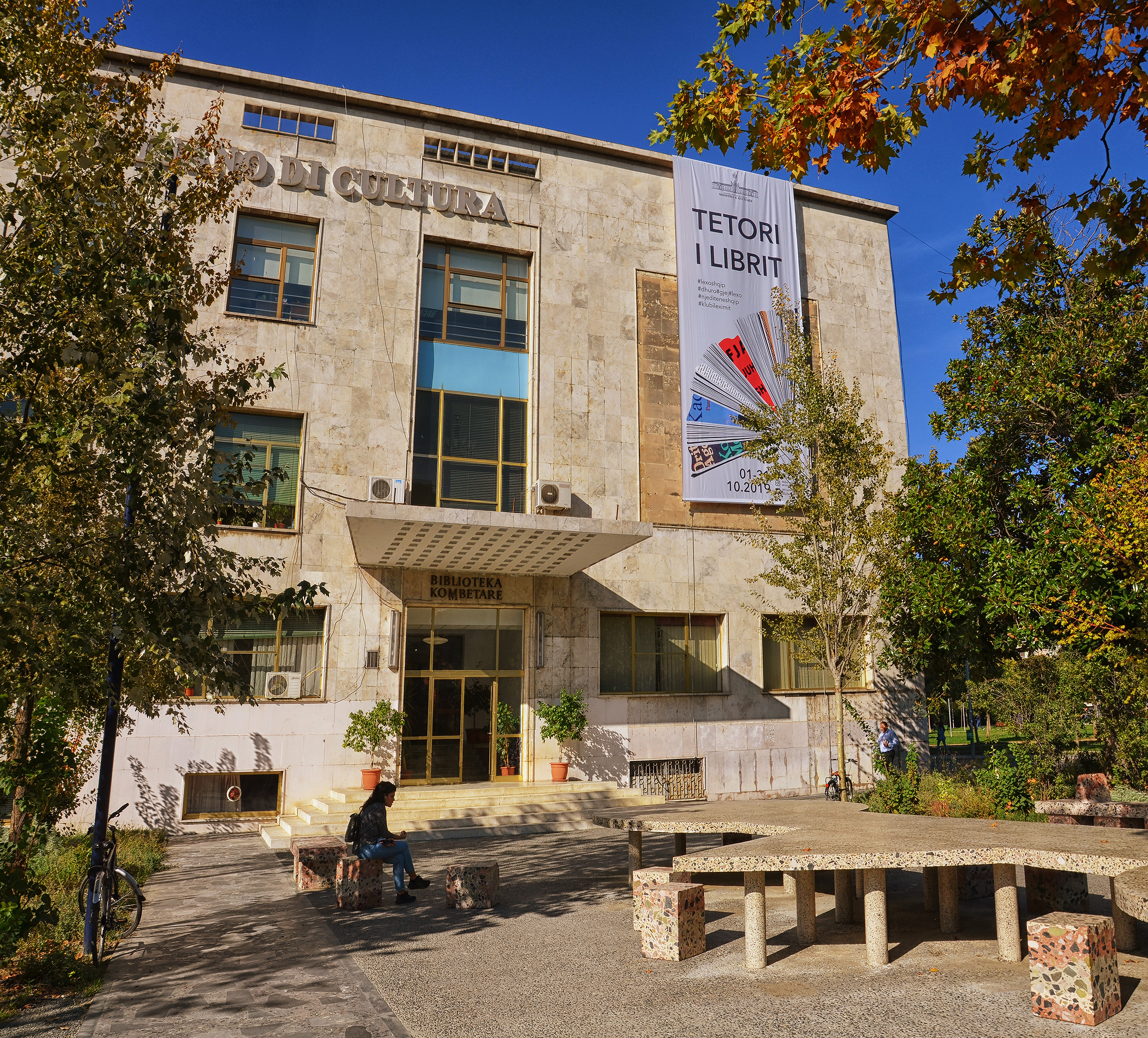
- National Library building in 2019
- 41.328564515813724°N 19.82089598407398°E
- Location: Skanderbeg Square 9, 1001 Tirana, Albania
- Established: 1922 (104 years ago)

Collection
- Items collected: books, journals, newspapers, magazines, maps, atlases, microforms
- Size: 1M items

Other information
- Director: Persida Asllani
- Website: www.bksh.al

The National Library of Albania (Albanian: Biblioteka Kombëtare e Shqipërisë) is Albania's national library headquartered in the country's capital, Tirana. It was founded in 1920 and inaugurated on December 10, 1922.

== History ==
The Library Commission of Albania began planning the National Library of Albania (NLA) as early as 1917 before its creation on July 10, 1920. The NLA is the primary national cultural institution and the oldest in the Albanian State. By the end of World War II, the NLA was housed in multiple locations across Albania. In 1966, it was relocated to its current place in Tirana. Between 1917 and 1995, the collections grew from 3,000 to nearly 1 million items. As keeper of national heritage, the NLA's mission is to "collect, process, restore, preserve and to make available to the public the written cultural heritage of the Albanian people."

With the fall of communism in the 1990s, the NLA enacted new policies to overturn restricted and limited access to information and library materials. During this time, the automated library system was first introduced in Albania as most institutions lacked technology.

The NLA currently occupies two buildings and is organized and functions under the authority of the Ministry of Tourism, Culture, Youth and Sports. At the national level it organizes library education and continuing professional education, and is the study research centre in the field of librarianship, the cataloguing in publications centre, the national ISBN Agency, and the only preservation and restoration centre for special collections. Its archive comprises a total of 1,169.767 books, periodicals, maps, atlases, microfilms and other library materials. The special collections are valuable for national as well as European culture.

The library is open 72 hours a week to anyone over 16 years old. Users can borrow library materials or use them in the reading rooms. The library's website enables the users to search a directory as well as services, such as the OPAC, digitized catalogues, and the digital collections. The NLA organizes exhibitions, book promotions, conferences and so on. First enacted in 1922 and later revised in 1992, the NLA became the archival repository for all Albanian publications by the Legal Deposit Law. As a legal deposit institution the NLA publishes the National Bibliography. For the national library network it publishes the scientific-cultural review Bibliothecae, textbooks, professional guides, and manuals.

== Librarianship ==
Since 1969, the NLA has been home to the National School of Librarianship. Until the University of Tirana created a master's program for Library and Information Science in 2009, the National School of Librarianship was the only program in Albania to offer education for information professionals.

== Organizations ==
The NLA is a member of IFLA, LIBER, CENL, CDNL, The European Library and has been invited officially to become a partner in the World Digital Library.

In an effort to promote library and technology development, Albania established the Library of the Albanian Assembly in 1992 and partnered with the EIFL in 2020.

== See also ==
- National Archives of Albania
