= Technical Construction Archive (Albania) =

Archive of construction project files

Arkivi Qendror Teknik i Ndërtimit
- Interactive map of Arkivi Qendror Teknik i Ndërtimit
- 41.3205°N 19.8055°E
- Location: Tirana, Albania
- Type: Archives
- Established: 26 July 1993
- Director: Gjergj Thomai
- Website: www.aqtn.gov.al

The Central Technical Construction Archive (AQTN) was established on July 26, 1993 in Tirana, Albania. It gathered technical construction projects of former institutes (ISP, N.GJ.GJ, ISPUK, ISPUN, ISPU) which belonged to Albania's former Ministry of Construction fund, materials from the Municipality of Tirana and KRRTSH decisions. AQTN's documentary archive has over 45,000 files and 556,000 pages, with the first document dating back to 1911 "Reconstruction of Buna Bridge". The main task of the archive is to preserve, maintain and manage the technical documentation in the field of construction to meet the requirements of private and public entities for technical documentation at its disposal.

== See also ==
- List of archives in Albania
