= Papyrus 95 =

- New Testament manuscript
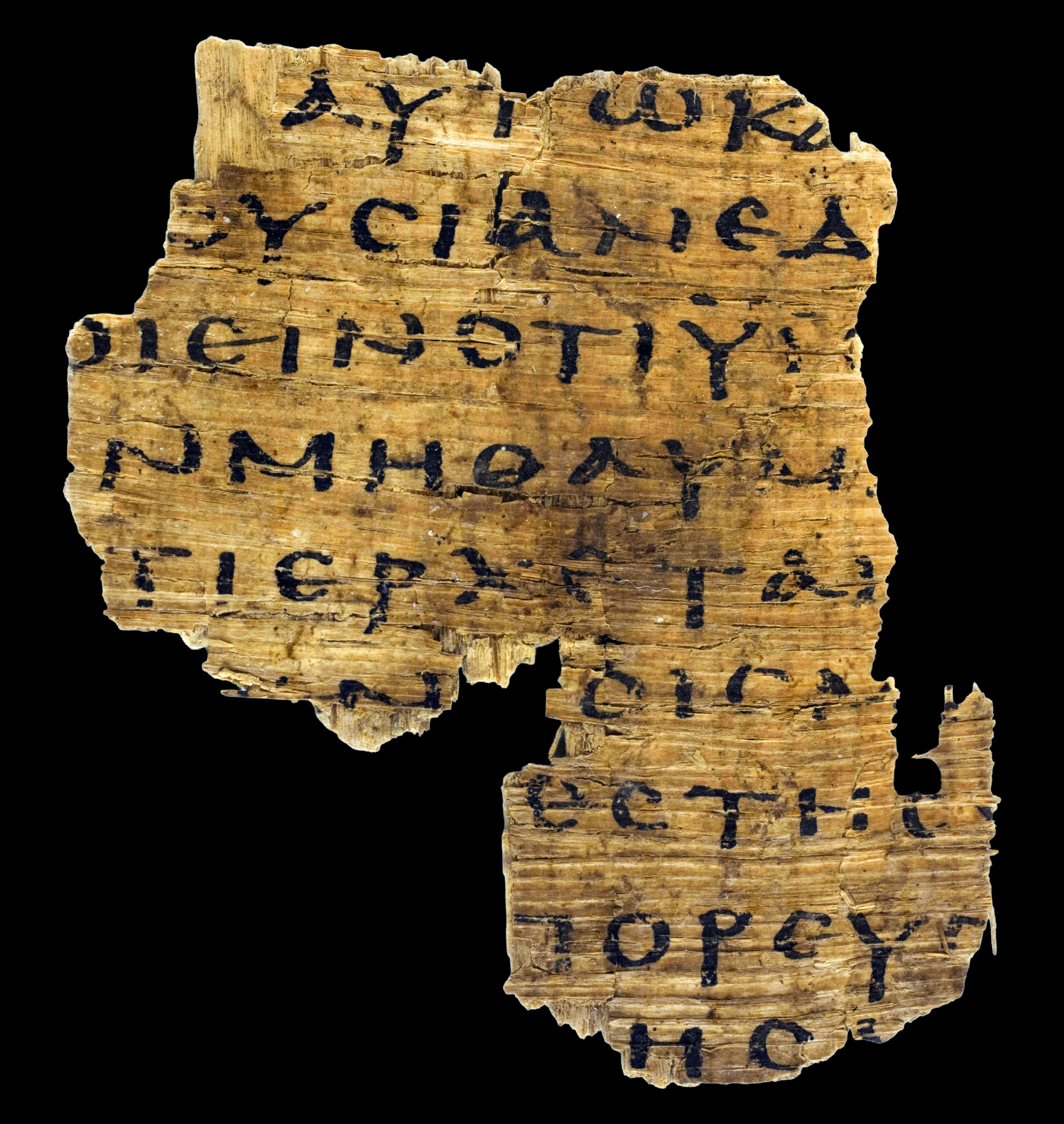
- Recto, John 5:26-29
- Name: P. Laur. PL II/31
- Sign: 𝔓^{95}
- Text: John 5:26-29,36-38
- Date: 3rd century
- Script: Greek
- Now at: Universita Degli Studi di Milano
- Cite: J. Lenaerts, Un papyrus de l’Évangile de Jean : PL II/31, Chronique d’ Egypte 60 (1985), pp. 117-120
- Size: [12] x [24] cm
- Type: Alexandrian text-type
- Category: I

Papyrus 95 is an early copy of the New Testament in Greek. It is a papyrus manuscript of the Gospel of John in a fragmentary condition. It is designated by the siglum 𝔓^{95} in the Gregory-Aland numbering of New Testament manuscripts. The surviving texts of John are verses 5:26-29,36-38. Using the study of comparative writing styles (palaeography), it has been assigned to the early 3rd century.

== Description ==
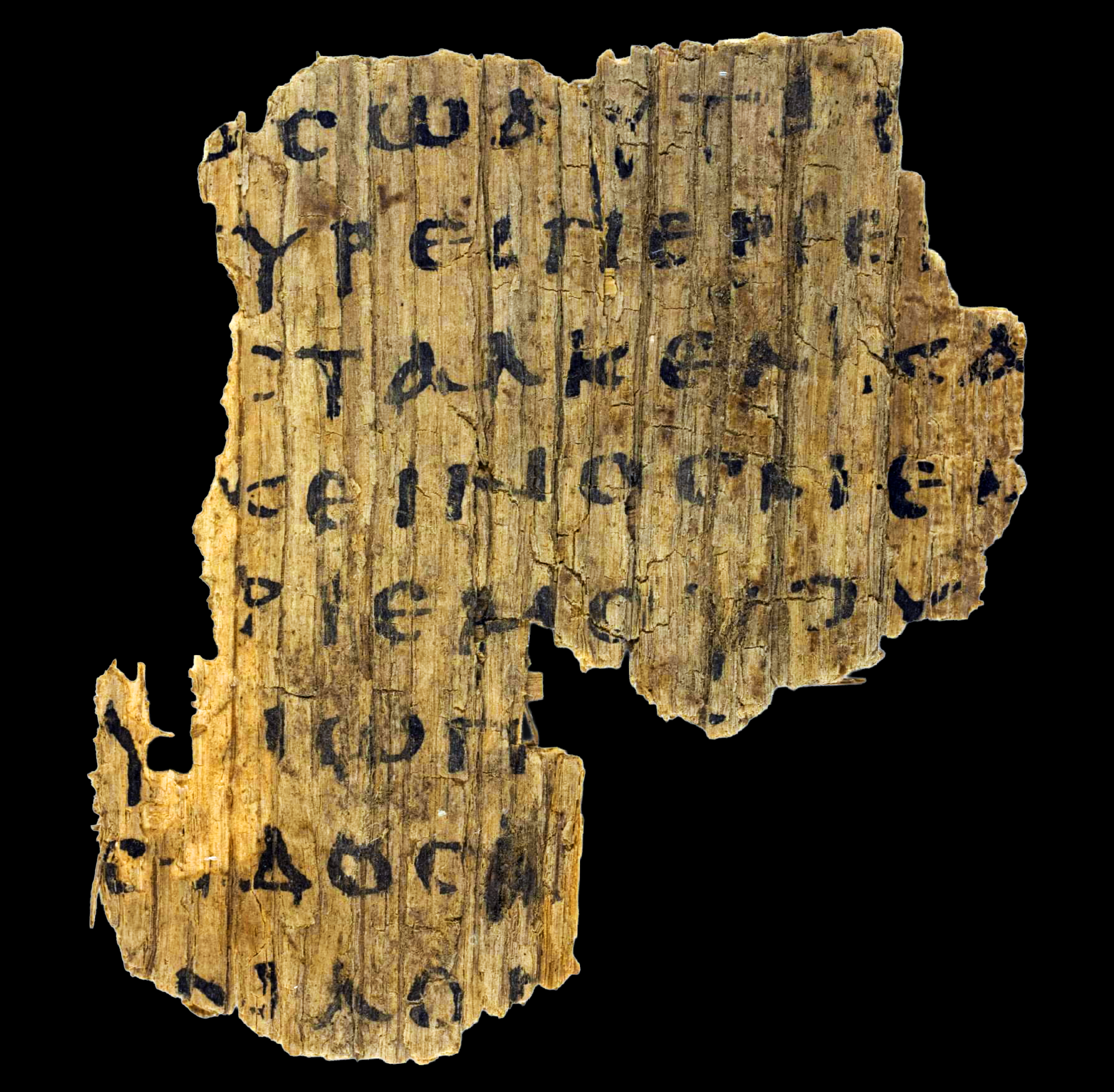
Verso, John 5:36-38

The writing is in 35 lines per page. The fragment should have the word πατήρ contracted (known as a nomen sacrum) in two places, however the place where these would appear is missing due to the fragmentary nature of the manuscript. The manuscript is currently housed at the Biblioteca Medicea Laurenziana (PL II/31) at Florence.

== Text ==
The Greek text of this manuscript is considered a representative of the Alexandrian text-type. Papyrologist and biblical scholar Philip Comfort describes it as proto-Alexandrian, though the extant portion is too fragmentary for certainty. It has not yet been placed in any of the Categories of New Testament manuscripts.

== Textual variants ==
- 5:27 Word-spacing analysis indicates that 10-14 letters intruded between the first two words of the verse
- 5:28: ακουσουσιν (akousousin, 'shall hear' (future tense)) becomes ακουσαντες (akousantes, 'have heard' (aorist aspect, participle)).
- 5:36: omits second 'αυτα' (auta, these) through possible homoeoteleuton.

== See also ==
- List of New Testament papyri

== Images ==
- Digital Images of 𝔓^{95} online at the CSNTM
- Description with Greek text.
