= AIDSSH (Albania) =

Albanian public entity which handles State Security documents

Authority for Information on Former State Security Documents
- Autoriteti për Informimin mbi Dokumentet e ish-Sigurimit të Shtetit
- Official logo

Government agency overview
- Formed: 22 May 2015 (11 years ago)
- Jurisdiction: Assembly of Albania
- Headquarters: Njësia Administrative nr. 4, Rruga e Dibrës, Garnizoni “Skënderbej”, Tirana, Albania
- Government agency executive: Gentiana Sula, Director
- Website: aidssh.al

The Authority for Information on Former State Security Documents (Albanian: Autoriteti për Informimin mbi Dokumentet e ish-Sigurimit të Shtetit – AIDSSH) is a public, independent, legal entity in the Republic of Albania, responsible for the collection, administration, processing and use of former State Security documents and any information related to them. The authority is headquartered in Tirana and is financed primarily by the state budget and other legal sources.

== Overview ==
The Authority for Information on Former State Security Documents was established by presidential decree on 22 May 2015 as a collegial body with powers and responsibilities in accordance with the provisions of Law no. 45/2015, titled "On the right to information about the documents of the former State Security of the People's Socialist Republic of Albania".

It collects, stores, administers and uses the documents of the former Directorate of State Security (Sigurimi), in compliance with this law, using as necessary the information provided by the Central Register of Civil Status.

The authority takes measures for the temporary proscription of the use of these documents when the prosecution or the courts determine that their use may damage the investigative activity, the criminal prosecution, the progress or the conclusion of a registered criminal proceeding.

== See also ==
- Sigurimi
- General Directorate of Archives
