= Vlatades Monastery =

14th Century Byzantine Monastery

Coordinates: 40.6418°N 22.9545°E

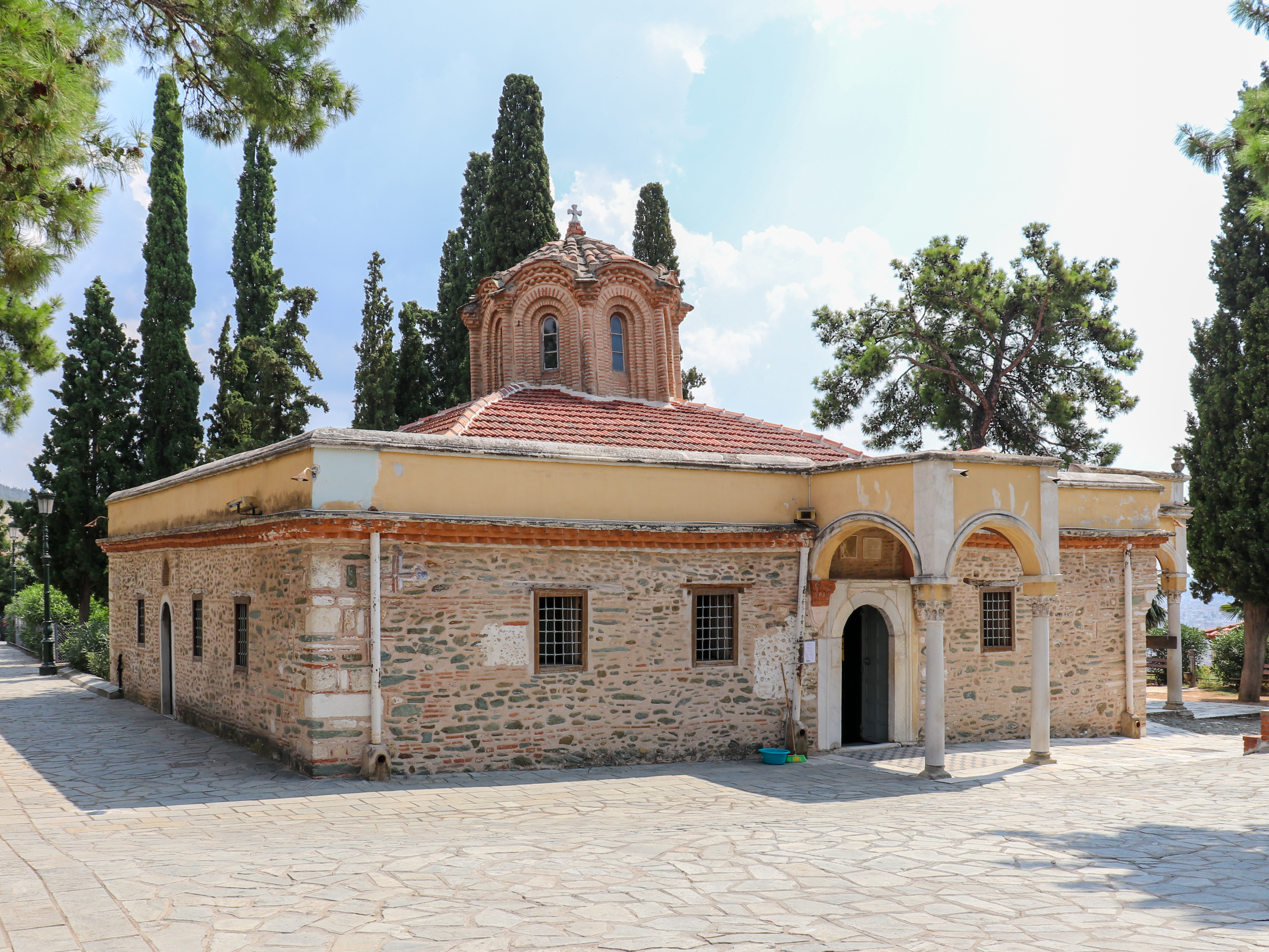
Exterior view

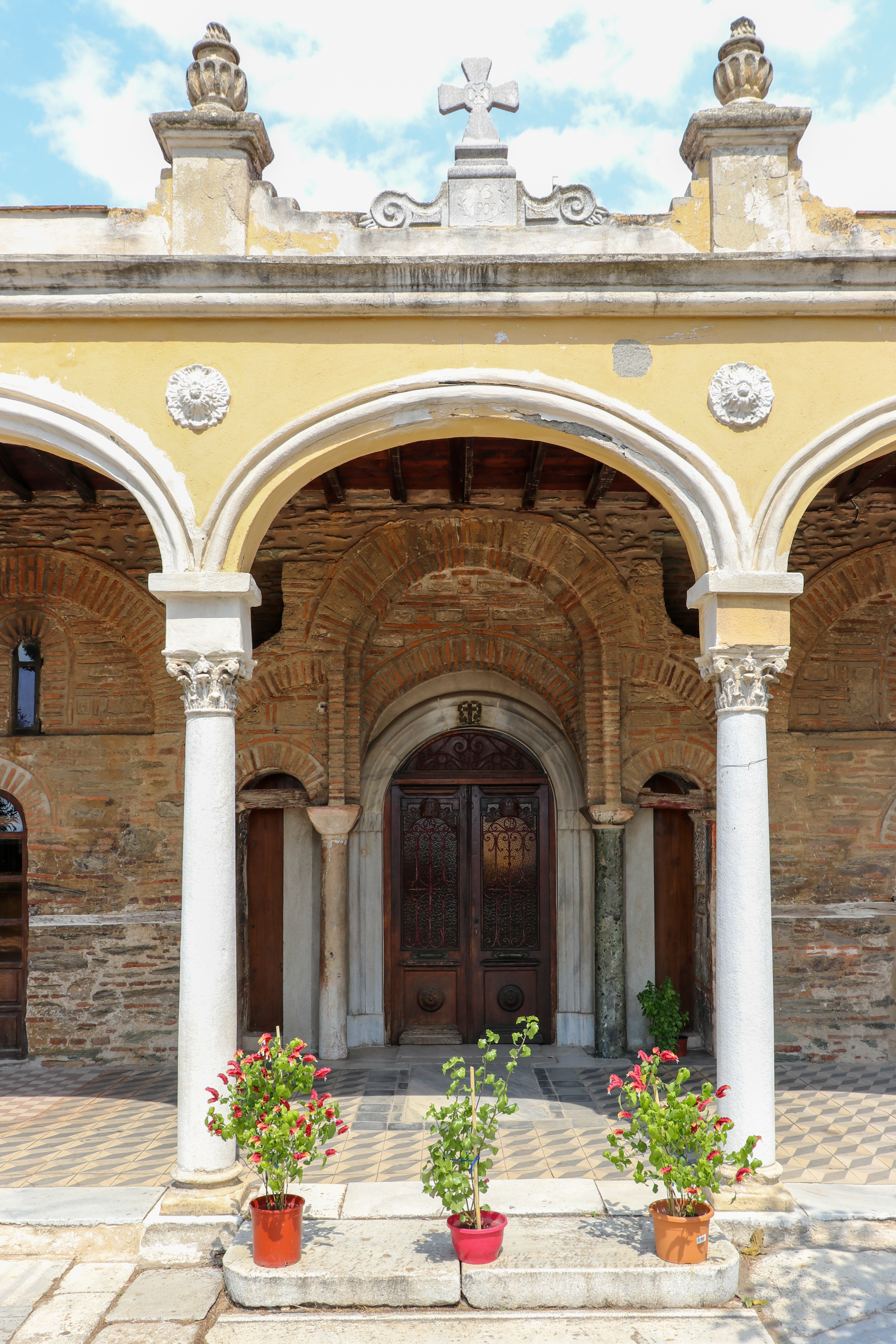
Entrance

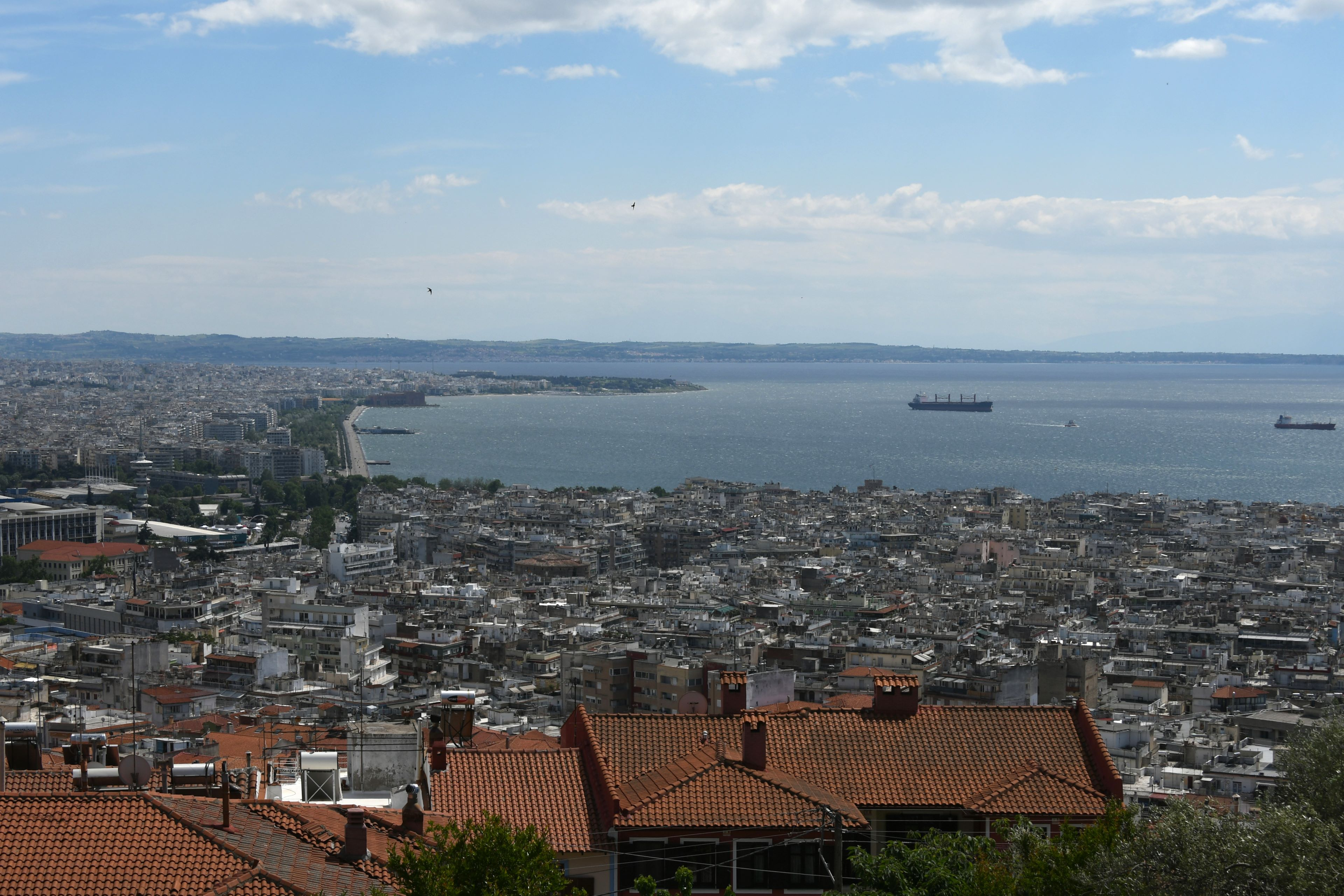
View from the monastery

Vlatades Monastery or Vlatadon Monastery (Greek: Μονή Βλατάδων) is a monastery in Ano Poli, Thessaloniki, Greece. Built in the 14th century during the late era of the Byzantine Empire, it is a UNESCO World Heritage Site along with 14 other Paleochristian and Byzantine monuments of Thessaloniki because of its Byzantine architecture and importance of Thessaloniki during early and medieval Christianity. It is believed to have been built on the former site of Jason's house. The Vlatades Monastery was spared from pillage during the siege of Thessalonica (1422-1430), as its monks cooperated with the Ottoman troops during the battle for the city. During Ottoman rule, it was granted privileged status on the orders of Sultan Murad II. In 2005, a manuscript of Galen's Peri Alypias was discovered in the monastery's library.
