= Peri Alypias =

Ancient philosophical writing genre

Peri Alypias (Ancient Greek: Περὶ Ἀλυπίας, lit. 'On Consolation from Grief'), also known as De indolentia, is a treatise composed by Galen after a massive fire in the centre of Rome in 192 AD. Galen's original Greek text was considered lost until it was discovered in 2005 in the library of the Vlatadon Monastery in Thessaloniki by then-PhD student Antoine Pietrobelli.

Prior to its rediscovery, Galen's Peri Alypias was only known from fragmentary references and quotes in Arabic and Hebrew, and the title was mentioned in Galen's On My Own Books (De Libris Propiis).

== History ==
Although the inspiration for Galen's Peri Alypias was the fire of Rome in 192 AD and the loss of many of Galen's books, the genre of writing on the prevention and cures of grief date back to 5th century BC Greece with Antiphon the Sophist's Peri Alypias, as described by Plutarch. Other treatises under the same name or genre include those (now lost) by Eratosthenes of Cyrene and another by Diogenes of Babylon, a preserved Greek text by Maximus of Tyre, the third book of Cicero's Tusculanae Disputationes, and Plutarch's On Tranquility of Mind.

Galen's Peri Alypias was written as a letter to an anonymous friend in Galen's hometown of Pergamon describing the destruction of his books and surgical tools in the fire of 192 and how he endured their losses. It accounts for Galen's losses as a practicing physician and offers remedies rooted in Stoicism, including a frugal life, disdain for human affairs, preparation for loss, rejection of politics, and an insistence upon logic and proof over subjective opinion. Galen provides a list of where his books were located, their fate in the fire, and an account of the books owned by others that were also destroyed which Galen had re-edited and commented upon. Books destroyed included those by Aristotle, Anaxagoras, Andromachus, and Theophrastus. Most distressingly, he reported the loss of his pharmakon (recipes for drugs, remedies, and prescriptions).

Galen's work was likely written in the early months of 193 AD, after the death of the emperor Commodus, as Peri Alypias includes critical remarks of his policies. Comparable use of letter writing as a conventional form for works that addressing the "therapy of emotions" can be found in Plutarch and Seneca.

Galen recorded the treatise in his De Libris Propiis among his other works on ethics. Parts of it survived in translations into Arabic, from Syriac, and into Hebrew in the 12th and 13th centuries. There is evidence that Galen's Peri Alypias was read by Arab and Iranian philosophers, including Al-Kindi, Hunayn ibn Ishaq, and Abu Bakr al-Razi, in the 9th and 10th centuries. A letter of Al-Kindi's, On Dispelling Sorrow, survives from the 9th century and a chapter of Razi's Spiritual Medicine is devoted to the topic. The last evidence of Galen's work, prior to its rediscovery, was in the 13th century by a physician named Joseph ben Judah ibn Aknin. None of the translations of Galen's work into Syriac and Arabic survive today.

== Rediscovery ==
In 2005, Antoine Pietrobelli discovered a Galenic manuscript in the library of Vlatades Monastery that contained four Galenic items, one of which was the entire text of Peri Alypias. As of 2022, at least seven editions or translations of Peri Alypias have been published in English, French, Greek, and Italian. The Greek text had been copied from an unknown original in the decade prior to the fall of Constantinople by Andreiôménos, a student of John Argyropoulos at the Xenon of the Krall, a hospital in Constantinople. The British medical historian Vivian Nutton has stated that the discovery of the manuscript in Thessaloniki "must rank with one of the most spectacular finds ever of ancient literature".
