= General Directorate of Civil Status (Albania) =

Government agency of Albania

- Drejtoria e Përgjithshme e Gjendjes Civile
- Official logo

Government agency overview
- Formed: 1 April 1929 (97 years ago)
- Jurisdiction: Council of Ministers
- Headquarters: Tirana, Albania
- Minister responsible: Bledar Çuçi, Ministry of Internal Affairs
- Government agency executive: Vangjush Stavro, Director General

The General Directorate of Civil Status (Albanian: Drejtoria e Përgjithshme e Gjendjes Civile – DPGjC) is the agency in charge of civil records in Albania.
