= Center for the Study of New Testament Manuscripts =

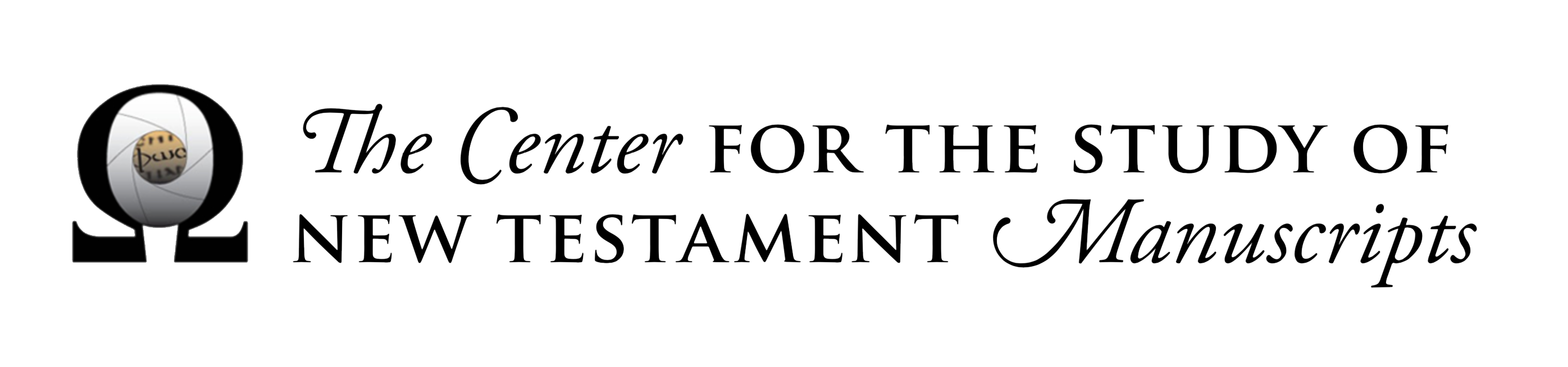
- Abbreviation: CSNTM
- Formation: 13 September 2002
- Founder: Daniel B. Wallace
- Legal status: 501(c)(3)
- Location: Plano, TX
- Executive Director: Daniel B. Wallace
- Chairman of the Board: Michael W. Holmes
- Parent organization: Center for the Research of Early Christian Documents
- Website: csntm.org

The Center for the Study of New Testament Manuscripts (CSNTM) is a 501(c)(3) non-profit organization whose mission is to digitally preserve Greek New Testament manuscripts. Toward that end, CSNTM takes digital photographs of manuscripts at institutions, libraries, museums, monasteries, universities, and archives around the world. The images produced are freely accessible on the Center's website—a searchable library of Greek New Testament manuscripts. With more than 50,000 users examining manuscripts in their digital library each year, the Center's digitization work facilitates a partnership between manuscript owners, archivists, and researchers around the world.

== Background ==
New Testament scholar and professor Daniel B. Wallace founded CSNTM in September 2002 to utilize emerging technologies to photograph and fully archive all known Greek New Testament manuscripts. The Center is based in Plano, Texas. As of 2019, the CSNTM has collaborated with more than 45 institutions on 4 continents to produce nearly 300,000 images from approximately 700 New Testament manuscripts. In the process, they have discovered over 75 New Testament manuscripts that were previously unknown. Their online library features images or links to more than 1,700 manuscripts.

== Equipment ==
CSNTM uses 50.6-megapixel Canon EOS 5DS cameras mounted on a customized Graz Traveller's Conservation Copy Stand for its standard digitization projects. The Traveller's Conservation Copy Stand is specially designed for digitally preserving fragile materials.

In 2018, CSNTM acquired Multispectral Imaging (MSI) technology from MegaVision and has adapted the Graz system to make this technology portable as well.

== GA 2882 ==
In October 2005, the Center for the Study of New Testament Manuscripts acquired a tenth or eleventh century minuscule of the Gospel of Luke on parchment. It was later catalogued as Gregory–Aland 2882.

== Select major projects ==
=== Biblioteca Medicea Laurenziana (2011) ===
In November 2011, CSNTM traveled to the Biblioteca Medicea Laurenziana (BML) in Florence, Italy. The phenomenal library, founded by the Medici family and designed by none other than Michelangelo himself, holds over 2500 papyri, 11,000 total manuscripts, and 128,000 printed texts. Through this trip, CSNTM added new images of 28 manuscripts from the BML.

This BML collection contains papyri, majuscules, minuscules, and lectionaries. Highlights from the expedition include GA Lect 117 (an eleventh-century lectionary, written entirely in gold letters), GA 620 (features Paul's epistles after the book of Revelation—a very rare phenomenon), and GA 367 (one of only sixty complete Greek New Testament manuscripts known to exist).

=== Chester Beatty Library (2013) ===
Over the course of a four-week expedition in July–August 2013, a six-person team from CSNTM digitized all the Greek biblical papyri at the Chester Beatty Library in Dublin, Ireland. The Chester Beatty Papyri, published in the 1930s and 1950s, are some of the oldest and most important biblical manuscripts known to exist. Housed at the CBL, they have attracted countless visitors every year. It is safe to say that the only Greek biblical manuscripts that might receive more visitors are Codex Sinaiticus and Codex Alexandrinus—both on display at the British Library.

The New Testament papyri at the CBL include P46 (the oldest manuscript of Paul's letters—dated c. AD 200), P45 (the oldest manuscript of Mark's Gospel, with portions of the other Gospels and Acts—3rd century), and P47 (the oldest manuscript of Revelation—3rd century). One or two of the Old Testament papyri are as old as the 2nd century AD. CSNTM photographed each manuscript against white and black backgrounds, every image being over 120 megabytes, and some of the photographs revealing text that had not been seen before. Besides the papyri, CSNTM also digitized all of the Greek New Testament manuscripts at the CBL as well as several others, including some early apocryphal texts. The total number of images came to more than 5100.

=== University of Michigan (2014) ===
In July 2014, CSNTM traveled to the University of Michigan in Ann Arbor, Michigan to digitize their portion of P46. This was part of a combined project that virtually reunited P46, since it is housed in two separate locations (University of Michigan & Chester Beatty Library). The University's preservation department is known around the world for their work in papyrological preservation.

=== National Library of Greece (2015–2016) ===
CSNTM completed one of their largest digitization projects at the National Library of Greece (NLG) in Athens. Beginning in 2015 and continuing into 2016, roughly forty-five people worked for months intermittently at the National Library digitizing their entire collection of Greek New Testament manuscripts. This collection is one of the largest in the world and has a multitude of priceless artifacts.

Over 150,000 pages of manuscripts were digitized (more than 300 manuscripts), and about 200,000 pages were examined—the difference due to the fact that several of the artifacts were deemed not to be New Testament manuscripts or were too fragile to digitize. In the process, 21 manuscripts unknown to the Institute for New Testament Textual Research (INTF) in Münster, Germany were digitized.

=== National Centre of Manuscripts (2018) ===
In the summer of 2018, CSNTM traveled to Tbilisi, Georgia to digitize five manuscripts housed at the National Centre of Manuscripts. Foremost among these manuscripts was Codex Koridethi (Θ), a 9th-century majuscule manuscript of the Gospels, but also early majuscules 0211 and 0240 of the Gospels and Paul's letters, respectively. 0240 is a palimpsest that required digitization utilizing multispectral imaging. Alongside these three manuscripts, two lectionaries were also digitized.

=== Heidelberg University (2018) ===
Following the expedition in Tbilisi, CSNTM digitized manuscripts at Heidelberg University's Institute for Papyrology. Once again, the multispectral imaging camera was used to capture images of three very early manuscripts: P40, 0166, and 0187. These three manuscripts contain portions of the Gospels, Acts, and Paul and date between the 3rd and 6th centuries.

== Complete list of projects ==
=== Europe ===
- Bible Museum, Münster, Westphalia, Germany (2002–2003)
- Tübingen University Library, Tübingen, Germany (2003)
- Ecumenical Patriarchate, Istanbul, Turkey (2004)
- Monastery of St. John the Theologian, Patmos, Greece (2006–2008)
- National Archives; Tirana, Albania (2007–2008)
- University of Glasgow Library, Glasgow, Scotland (2008)
- St Andrews University Library, St Andrews, Scotland (2008)
- De Hamel Collection, Cambridge, England (2008)
- Christ's College, Cambridge, England (2008)
- Clare College, Cambridge, England (2008)
- Tyndale House, Cambridge, England (2008)
- Arundel Castle, England (2008)
- Leicestershire Record Office, Leicester, England (2008)
- Bavarian State Library, Munich, Germany (2009)
- Benaki Museum, Athens, Greece (2009)
- National Historical Museum, Historical and Ethnological Society, Athens, Greece (2009).
- Private Collection, United Kingdom (2009)
- Byzantine and Christian Museum, Athens, Greece (2010–2011)
- Museum of Literature, Iasi, Romania (2010)
- Biblioteca Medicea Laurenziana, Florence, Italy (2011)
- Gennadius Library, American School of Classical Studies, Athens, Greece (2012)
- University of Athens Historical Museum, Athens, Greece (2012)
- Zagora Historical Library, Athens, Greece (2012–2013)
- Chester Beatty Library, Dublin, Ireland (2013)
- National Library of Greece, Athens, Greece (2014–16)
- University of Edinburgh, Edinburgh, Scotland (2016)
- Tatarnis Monastery, Tripotamon, Greece (2017)
- Panagias Monastery, Proussos, Greece (2017)
- Hellenic Parliament, Athens, Greece (2018)
- Byzantine Museum of Ioannina, Ioannina, Greece (2018)
- Institute for Papyrology, Heidelberg University, Heidelberg, Germany (2018)

=== Asia ===
- National Centre of Manuscripts, Tbilisi, Republic of Georgia (2018)

=== Australia ===
- Macquarie University, Sydney, Australia (2009)
- Auckland Public Library, Auckland, New Zealand (2009)

=== North America ===
- Charles C. Ryrie Private Collection, Dallas, Texas, USA (2003–2004)
- Private Collection, Dallas, TX (2003)
- Private Collection, Pennsylvania (2005)
- The Scriptorium, Orlando, Florida, USA (2008)
- Gruber Collection, Lutheran School of Theology at Chicago, Chicago, Illinois, USA (2010)
- Bridwell Library, Southern Methodist University, Dallas, Texas, USA (2010) (2019)
- Drew University, Madison, New Jersey, USA (2012)
- Trinity College, Hartford, Connecticut, USA (2012)
- American Bible Society, New York City, New York, USA (2012)
- New York Public Library, Rare Books and Manuscripts Division, New York City, New York, USA (2012)
- University of Michigan, Ann Arbor, Michigan, USA (2008) (2014)
- Southwestern Baptist Theological Seminary, Fort Worth, Texas, USA (2014)
- Houston Baptist University, Houston, Texas, USA (2019)
- Southern Baptist Theological Seminary, Louisville, Kentucky, USA (2019)

== See also ==
- Institute for New Testament Textual Research
- Textual Criticism
- Digital Humanities
