= Minuscule 1143 =

- New Testament manuscript
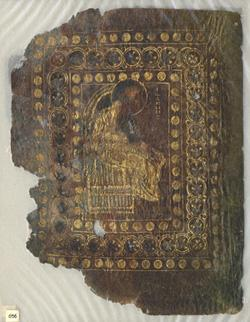
- John Evangelist
- Text: Gospels
- Date: 9th century
- Script: Greek
- Found: Berat
- Now at: National Archives of Albania
- Size: 24 x 19 cm
- Type: Byzantine text-type
- Category: none

Minuscule 1143 (in the Gregory-Aland numbering), ε 1035 (von Soden), also known as the Beratinus 2 (Albanian: Kodiku i Beratit nr. 2), or Codex Aureus Anthimi (The Golden Book of Anthimos). It is a Greek minuscule manuscript of the New Testament on purple parchment, dated paleographically to the 9th century. This is one of the seven “purple codices” in the world to have survived to the present day, and one of the two known purple minuscules (Minuscule 565 is the other) written with a gold ink.

== Description ==
The codex contains the complete text of the four Gospels, on 420 purple parchment leaves (24 by 19 cm). The text is written in one column per page, 17 lines per page, in gold. It is written in early minuscule, but some parts of the codex in semi-uncial, and titles in uncial letters. The codex contains simple miniatures, mainly geometrical figures, without any direct Christian symbols. There are also ornaments on the metal cover.

In terms of style and age, it is comparable to the Empress Theodora's Codex.

The text is divided according to the κεφαλαια (chapters), whose numerals are given at the margin. There is also a division according to the smaller Ammonian Sections, with references to the Eusebian Canons.

It contains tables of the κεφαλαια (tables of contents) before each Gospel.

== Text ==
The Greek text of the codex is a representative of the Byzantine text-type. Kurt Aland did not place it in any Category. It was not examined by the Claremont Profile Method.

== History ==
The origin of this manuscript has been and remains the subject of debate. It was found in a church of Berat, and became known after publication written by bishop of Berat “Description abrégée et historique de la sainte métropole de Belgrade, aujourd’hui Berat” (Corfu, 1868). It was examined by Pierre Batiffol.

Formerly the codex was located in a church in Berat. Since 1971, it has been housed in the National Archives of Albania (No. 2) at Tirana. Codex Beratinus 2 now is registered with the UNESCO as a world treasure.

== See also ==
- List of New Testament minuscules (1001–2000)
- Purple parchment
- Textual criticism
