= General Directorate of Archives (Albania) =

Archive in Tirana, Albania

- Drejtoria e Përgjithshme e Arkivave
- Interactive map of General Directorate of Archives
- 41°20′09″N 19°48′47″E
- Location: Tirana, Albania
- Type: National archives
- Established: 8 June 1949
- Director: Ardit Bido
- Website: www.arkiva.gov.al

The General Directorate of Archives (Albanian: Drejtoria e Përgjithshme e Arkivave) is the national archive of the Republic of Albania, located in Tirana. Under the former control of the Party of Labour of Albania, the directorate houses the papers of the former People's Socialist Republic of Albania, and papers that were held by citizens prior to the regime. Completely modernized to archival standards as of 2004, with help from the Swiss Federal Archives, the archives also houses the Codex Beratinus and the Codex Beratinus II.

== History ==
During the country's time as the People's Socialist Republic of Albania, the collections and facilities fell into disrepair. Collections catalogues were written by hand, and the archives had no formal collection management system. Upon the fall of the regime, the archives were looted.

In 1994, the archives was contacted by the Swiss Federal Archives, who offered aid in conserving collections and updating the facilities. For ten years, ending in 2004, the Swiss contributed 1.9 million Swiss francs to the archives. The archives also started to significantly expand their collections. The Swiss funds went to digitizing almost two million records from card catalogues and to create an online search system for the records. The search system was released online in 2017.

In 2003, the archives hosted the second Islamic Civilization in the Balkans conference.

== Collections ==
There are two primary archives locations, the primary being in Tirana, and the second being district archives throughout the country. The archives receives almost 25,000 requests from the public and approximately 100 academics and students visit the facility yearly for materials and research. In 2011, the archives became a partner with the World Digital Library.

The Albanian National Archives collects private archives, including content from political organizations, Albanian organizations located outside of the country, national exhibitions and aid agencies. The Tirana location houses the archives of the Party of Labour of Albania. The archives also holds deeds and contracts, which were placed in the archives when property was taken from landowners by the Party of Labour. Specific collections include correspondence between the People's Socialist Republic of Albania and the Swiss Communist Party.

Notable pieces in the collections include the Codex Beratinus and Codex Beratinus II, both which are listed in the Memory of the World Register. The archives also holds the Elbasan Gospel Manuscript, which is a primary document for those interested in the Elbasan alphabet.

== See also ==
- National Library of Albania
- List of national archives
- List of archives in Albania
- AIDSSH
