= List of New Testament minuscules (1001–1100) =

A New Testament minuscule is a copy of a portion of the New Testament written in a small, cursive Greek script (developed from Uncial).

== Legend ==
- The numbers (#) are the now standard system of Caspar René Gregory, often referred to as the Gregory-Aland numbers.
- Included among the cataloged minuscules are the following types of manuscripts, color coded:

Grey represents continuous text manuscripts containing only New Testament portions
Beige represents manuscripts with New Testament portions and a catena (quotations from church fathers)
Light cyan represents manuscripts of single-author commentaries who included the full Scripture text.
Light red represents manuscripts of single-author commentaries who included both the full Scripture text and a catena.
Light purple represents manuscripts of commentaries where the Scripture text was abridged.
White represents manuscript numbers no longer in use.

- Dates are estimated to the nearest 100 year increment where specific date is unknown.
- Content generally only describes sections of the New Testament: Gospels, The Acts of the Apostles (Acts), Pauline epistles, and so on. Sometimes the surviving portion of a codex is so limited that specific books, chapters or even verses can be indicated. Linked articles, where they exist, generally specify content in detail, by verse.
- Digital images are referenced with direct links to the hosting web pages, with the exception of those at the INTF. The quality and accessibility of the images is as follows:

Gold color indicates high resolution color images available online.
Tan color indicates high resolution color images available locally, not online.
Light tan color indicates only a small fraction of manuscript pages with color images available online.
Light gray color indicates black/white or microfilm images available online.
Light blue color indicates manuscript not imaged, and is currently lost or ownership unknown.
Light pink color indicates manuscript destroyed, presumed destroyed, or deemed too fragile to digitize.
Violet color indicates high resolution ultraviolet images available online.

† Indicates the manuscript has damaged or missing pages.
^{P} Indicates only a portion of the books were included.
^{K} Indicates manuscript also includes a commentary.
^{S} Indicates lost portions of manuscript replaced via supplement of a later hand.
^{abs} (abschrift) Indicates manuscript is copy.
[ ] Brackets around Gregory-Aland number indicate the manuscript belongs to an already numbered manuscript, was found to not be a continuous text manuscript, was found to be written in modern Greek versus Koine Greek, was proved a forgery, or has been destroyed.

== Minuscules 1001-1100 ==
#	Date	Contents	Pages	Institution and refs.	City, State	Country	Images
1001	13th	Gospels	272	Iviron Monastery, 33	Mount Athos	Greece	INTF
1002	14th	Gospels	219	Iviron Monastery, 51	Mount Athos	Greece	
1003	15th	Gospels, Acts, General Epistles, Pauline Epistles	305	Iviron Monastery, 52	Mount Athos	Greece	INTF
1004	13th	Gospels	191	Iviron Monastery, 334	Mount Athos	Greece	INTF, CSNTM
1005	14th	Gospels	227	Iviron Monastery, 55	Mount Athos	Greece	INTF, CSNTM
1005	14th	Gospels	227	Iviron Monastery, 55	Mount Athos	Greece	Elpenor
1006	11th	Gospels, Revelation	226	Iviron Monastery, 56	Mount Athos	Greece	INTF, CSNTM
1006	11th	Gospels, Revelation	226	Iviron Monastery, 56	Mount Athos	Greece	Elpenor
1007	12th	Gospels	254	Iviron Monastery, 59	Mount Athos	Greece	INTF, CSNTM
1008	13th	Gospels	145	Iviron Monastery, 61	Mount Athos	Greece	INTF, CSNTM
1009	13th	Gospels	230	Iviron Monastery, 63	Mount Athos	Greece	INTF, CSNTM
1010	12th	Gospels	187	Iviron Monastery, 66	Mount Athos	Greece	INTF, CSNTM
1011	1263	Gospels	151	Iviron Monastery, 67	Mount Athos	Greece	INTF, CSNTM
1012	11th	Gospels	239	Iviron Monastery, 68	Mount Athos	Greece	INTF, CSNTM
1013	11th/12th	Gospels	297	Iviron Monastery, 69	Mount Athos	Greece	INTF, CSNTM
1014	11th	Gospels	289	Iviron Monastery, 72	Mount Athos	Greece	INTF, CSNTM
1015	13th	Gospels	644	Iviron Monastery, 75	Mount Athos	Greece	INTF
1016 + [1150]	13th	Luke 1:1-10:42 (Nicetas Catena)	410	National Library, Taphu 466	Athens	Greece	INTF
1016 + [1150]	13th	Luke 11:1-24:53 (Nicetas Catena)	409	Iviron Monastery, 371	Mount Athos	Greece	INTF
1017	1433	Gospels	292	Iviron Monastery, 548	Mount Athos	Greece	INTF
1018	15th	Gospels	224	Iviron Monastery, 549	Mount Athos	Greece	INTF
1019	16th	Gospels	176	Iviron Monastery, 550	Mount Athos	Greece	INTF
1020	14th	Gospels	278	Iviron Monastery, 562	Mount Athos	Greece	INTF
1021	13th	Theophylact Commentary on the Gospels	372	Iviron Monastery, 599	Mount Athos	Greece	INTF, CSNTM
1022	14th	Acts, Pauline epistles, General Epistles	360	Walters Art Museum, Ms. W. 533	Baltimore, MD	USA	WAM
1023	1338	Gospels	271	Iviron Monastery, 608	Mount Athos	Greece	INTF, CSNTM
1024	15th	Gospels	232	Iviron Monastery, 610	Mount Athos	Greece	INTF
1025	14th	Gospels	277	Iviron Monastery, 636	Mount Athos	Greece	INTF
1026	15th	Gospels	170	Iviron Monastery, 641	Mount Athos	Greece	INTF
1027	1492	John of Constantinople Commentary on Matthew†, Mark†, Luke†	449	Iviron Monastery, 647	Mount Athos	Greece	INTF, CSNTM
1028	11th	Matthew†	79	Iviron Monastery, 217	Mount Athos	Greece	INTF, CSNTM
1029	14th	Theophylact Commentary on the Gospels	318	Iviron Monastery, 671	Mount Athos	Greece	INTF
1030	1518	Gospels	160	Iviron Monastery, 342	Mount Athos	Greece	INTF, CSNTM
1031	13th	Luke^{P}†, John^{P}†	53	Iviron Monastery, 719	Mount Athos	Greece	INTF
1032	14th	Gospels †	267	Karakallou Monastery, 19	Mount Athos	Greece	INTF
1032	14th	Gospels †	267	Karakallou Monastery, 19	Mount Athos	Greece	Elpenor
1033	14th	Gospels	212	Karakallou Monastery, 20	Mount Athos	Greece	MAR
1034	13th	Gospels	323	Karakallou Monastery, 31	Mount Athos	Greece	MAR
1034	13th	Gospels	323	Karakallou Monastery, 31	Mount Athos	Greece	Elpenor
1035	13th	Gospels	317	Karakallou Monastery, 34	Mount Athos	Greece	INTF
1036	14th	Gospels	165	Karakallou Monastery, 35	Mount Athos	Greece	INTF
1037	14th	Gospels	306	Karakallou Monastery, 36	Mount Athos	Greece	MAR
1038	14th	Gospels	209	Karakallou Monastery, 37	Mount Athos	Greece	MAR
1039	14th	Gospels	282	Karakallou Monastery, 111	Mount Athos	Greece	INTF
1040	14th	Gospels†, Acts†, General Epistles†, Pauline Epistles†	340	Karakallou Monastery, 121	Mount Athos	Greece	INTF
1041	1293	Matthew and Mark†	142	Karakallou Monastery, 128	Mount Athos	Greece	MAR
1042	14th	Gospels†	322	Karakallou Monastery, 198	Mount Athos	Greece	INTF
1043	14th	Theophylact Commentary on Matthew, John†	81	Konstamonitou Monastery, 1	Mount Athos	Greece	INTF
1044	17th	Gospels	178	Konstamonitou Monastery, 61	Mount Athos	Greece	INTF
1045	11th	Matthew, Mark, Luke	162	Konstamonitou Monastery, 105	Mount Athos	Greece	INTF
1046	12th	Gospels	141	Koutloumousiou Monastery, 67	Mount Athos	Greece	INTF
1047	13th	Gospels †	185	Koutloumousiou Monastery, 68	Mount Athos	Greece	INTF
1048	13th	Gospels	267	Koutloumousiou Monastery, 69	Mount Athos	Greece	INTF
1049	11th	Gospels	203	National Museum of Fine Arts, NMB 1961	Stockholm	Sweden	
1050	1268	Gospels	232	Koutloumousiou Monastery, 71	Mount Athos	Greece	INTF
1051	12th	Gospels	291	Owner unknown, formerly: Koutloumousiou Monastery, 72	Mount Athos	Greece	
1052	13th	Gospels †	267	Koutloumousiou Monastery, 73	Mount Athos	Greece	INTF
1053	13th	Gospels †	218	Koutloumousiou Monastery, 74	Mount Athos	Greece	INTF
1054	11th	Gospels †	351	Koutloumousiou Monastery, 75	Mount Athos	Greece	INTF
1055	10th	Gospels †	190	Koutloumousiou Monastery, 76	Mount Athos	Greece	INTF
1056	11th	Gospels	353	Koutloumousiou Monastery, 77	Mount Athos	Greece	INTF
1056	11th	Gospels	2	Victoria and Albert Museum	London	UK	INTF
1056	11th	Gospels	1	Princeton University Art Museum, 36-11	Princeton, NJ	USA	INTF
1057	13th	Gospels	201	Koutloumousiou Monastery, 78	Mount Athos	Greece	INTF
1058	1145	Gospels, Acts, General Epistles, Pauline Epistles	290	Koutloumousiou Monastery, 90a	Mount Athos	Greece	INTF
1059	15th	Gospels	204	Koutloumousiou Monastery, 278	Mount Athos	Greece	INTF
1060	15th	Gospels	167	Koutloumousiou Monastery, 281	Mount Athos	Greece	INTF
1061	1362	Gospels	258	Koutloumousiou Monastery, 283	Mount Athos	Greece	INTF
1061	1362	Gospels	258	Koutloumousiou Monastery, 283	Mount Athos	Greece	Elpenor
1062	14th	Gospels	269	Koutloumousiou Monastery, 284, fol. 1-269	Mount Athos	Greece	INTF
1063	1674	Gospels	143	Koutloumousiou Monastery, 285	Mount Athos	Greece	INTF
1064	18th	Gospels†, Revelation†	174	Koutloumousiou Monastery, 286	Mount Athos	Greece	INTF
1065	1576	Gospels	199	Koutloumousiou Monastery, 287	Mount Athos	Greece	INTF
1066	10th	Acts†, General Epistles†	145	Koutloumousiou Monastery, 288	Mount Athos	Greece	INTF
1067	14th	Acts^{P}, General Epistles^{P}, Pauline Epistles^{P}	55	Koutloumousiou Monastery, 289	Mount Athos	Greece	INTF
1068	17th	Gospels	200	Koutloumousiou Monastery, 290	Mount Athos	Greece	INTF
1069	13th	Acts, General Epistles, Pauline Epistles	179	Koutloumousiou Monastery, 291	Mount Athos	Greece	INTF
1070	13th	Acts, General Epistles, Pauline Epistles	228	Koutloumousiou Monastery, 293	Mount Athos	Greece	INTF
1071	12th	Gospels	181	Great Lavra Monastery, A' 104	Mount Athos	Greece	INTF, CSNTM
1072	13th	New Testament	411	Great Lavra Monastery, G' 80	Mount Athos	Greece	INTF
1073	10th/11th	Gospels^{S}, Acts	334	Great Lavra Monastery, A' 51	Mount Athos	Greece	INTF, CSNTM
1074	11th	Gospels	201	Great Lavra Monastery, A' 1	Mount Athos	Greece	INTF, CSNTM
1075	14th	New Testament	348	Great Lavra Monastery, L' 195	Mount Athos	Greece	INTF
1076	10th	Gospels	282	Great Lavra Monastery, A' 12	Mount Athos	Greece	INTF, CSNTM
1077	10th	Gospels	264	Great Lavra Monastery, A' 11	Mount Athos	Greece	INTF, CSNTM
1078	10th	Gospels	192	Great Lavra Monastery, A' 16	Mount Athos	Greece	INTF, CSNTM
1079	10th	Gospels	274	Great Lavra Monastery, A' 23	Mount Athos	Greece	INTF, CSNTM
1080	14th	Gospels	411	Great Lavra Monastery, A' 15	Mount Athos	Greece	INTF, CSNTM
1081	12th	Gospels	309	Xeropotamou Monastery, 103	Mount Athos	Greece	MAR
1082	14th	Gospels	284	Xeropotamou Monastery, 105	Mount Athos	Greece	INTF
1083	13th	Gospels	277	Xeropotamou Monastery, 107	Mount Athos	Greece	INTF
1084	14th	Gospels	309	Xeropotamou Monastery, 108	Mount Athos	Greece	INTF
1085	13th	Gospels†	550	Xeropotamou Monastery, 115	Mount Athos	Greece	INTF
1085	13th	Gospels†	550	Xeropotamou Monastery, 115	Mount Athos	Greece	Elpenor
1086	1648	Gospels	304	Xeropotamou Monastery, 123	Mount Athos	Greece	INTF
1087	13th	Gospels	159	Xeropotamou Monastery, 200	Mount Athos	Greece	INTF
1088	16th	Gospels	327	Xeropotamou Monastery, 205	Mount Athos	Greece	INTF
1089	1329	Gospels	201	Xeropotamou Monastery, 221	Mount Athos	Greece	INTF
1090	11th	Gospels	209	Xeropotamou Monastery, 396	Mount Athos	Greece	INTF
1091	12th	Gospels	189	St. Panteleimon Monastery, 25	Mount Athos	Greece	INTF
1092	14th	Gospels	250	St. Panteleimon Monastery, 26	Mount Athos	Greece	INTF
1093	1302	Gospels	190	St. Panteleimon Monastery, 28	Mount Athos	Greece	INTF
1094	13th	New Testament †	272	St. Panteleimon Monastery, 29	Mount Athos	Greece	INTF
1095	14th	Gospels	286	Agiou Pavlou monastery, 4	Mount Athos	Greece	INTF
1096	13th	Gospels	151	Agiou Pavlou monastery, 5	Mount Athos	Greece	INTF
1097	12th	Gospels †	279	Church of Protaton, 41	Mount Athos	Greece	MAR
1098	13th	Luke^{P}, John^{P}	180	Konstamonitou Monastery, 106	Mount Athos	Greece	
1099	14th	Acts, General Epistles, Pauline epistles	229	Dionysiou Monastery, 68	Mount Athos	Greece	INTF
1100	1376	Acts†, General Epistles†, Pauline epistles†	244	Dionysiou Monastery, 75	Mount Athos	Greece	INTF, CSNTM

[top]

== See also ==
- List of New Testament papyri
- List of New Testament uncials
- List of New Testament minuscules (1–1000)
- List of New Testament minuscules (1001–2000)
- List of New Testament minuscules (2001–)
- List of New Testament minuscules ordered by Location/Institution
- List of New Testament lectionaries

== Bibliography ==
- Aland, Kurt; M. Welte; B. Köster; K. Junack (1994). Kurzgefasste Liste der griechischen Handschriften des Neues Testaments. Berlin, New York: Walter de Gruyter. p. 95. ISBN 3-11-011986-2.
- "Liste Handschriften". Münster: Institute for New Testament Textual Research.
