= 2017 in poetry =

Nationality words link to articles with information on the nation's poetry or literature (for instance, Irish or France).

== Events ==
- May 23 – English poet Tony Walsh reads his 2013 poem "This is the place" to the crowds gathered in Albert Square, Manchester for a public vigil following this week's Manchester Arena bombing.
- June 23 – English-resident writer Ben Okri publishes his poem "Grenfell Tower, June 2017" in the Financial Times following this month's Grenfell Tower fire in London.

== Anniversaries ==
- March 1 – Centenary of the birth of the American poet Robert Lowell.

== Selection of works published in English ==
=== Australia ===
- Michael Farrell, I Love Poetry
- Alan Wearne, These Things Are Real
- Fiona Wright, Domestic Interior

=== Canada ===
- Billy-Ray Belcourt, This Wound Is a World
- Lorna Crozier, What the Soul Doesn't Want
- Nora Gould, Selah
- Aisha Sasha John, I have to live
- Benjamin Hertwig, Slow War
- Donato Mancini, Same Diff
- Julia McCarthy, All the Names Between
- Joshua Whitehead, Full-Metal Indigiqueer

=== New Zealand ===
- Airini Beautrais, Flow: Whanganui River Poems, Victoria University Press
- Kate Camp, The Internet of Things, Victoria University Press
- Paula Green, New York Pocket Book, Seraph Press

==== Poets in Best New Zealand Poems ====
These poets wrote the 25 poems selected for Best New Zealand Poems 2016 (guest editor was Jenny Bornholdt), published this year:

- Nick Ascroft
- Tusiata Avia
- Airini Beautrais
- Hera Lindsay Bird
- James Brown
- Rachel Bush
- John Dennison
- Ish Doney
- Lynley Edmeades
- Rata Gordon
- Bernadette Hall
- Scott Hamilton
- Adrienne Jansen
- Andrew Johnston
- Anna Livesey
- Bill Manhire
- Leslie McKay
- Bill Nelson
- Claire Orchard
- Vincent O’Sullivan
- Kerrin P. Sharpe
- Marty Smith
- Oscar Upperton
- Tim Upperton
- Ashleigh Young

=== United Kingdom ===
==== England ====
- Megan Beech, You Sad Feminist
- Emily Berry, Stranger, Baby
- Kayo Chingonyi, Kumukanda
- Helen Dunmore (d. June 5), Inside the Wave
- Michael Longley, Angel Hill (Northern Irish poet published in England)
- Robert Macfarlane, The Lost Words: A Spell Book (illustrated by Jackie Morris)
- Hollie McNish, Plum
- Sinéad Morrissey, On Balance (Northern Irish poet published in England)
- Richard Osmond, Useful Verses

=== United States ===
Alphabetical listing by author name

- Clark Coolidge, Selected Poems: 1962-1985, Station Hill Press
- Airea D. Matthews, Simulacra, Yale University Press
- Shara McCallum, Madwoman, Alice James Books
- Morgan Parker, There are More Beautiful Things than Beyoncé, Tin House Books

== Awards and honors by country ==
- See also: List of poetry awards

Awards announced this year:

=== International ===
- Struga Poetry Evenings Golden Wreath Laureate:

=== Australia awards and honors ===
- C. J. Dennis Prize for Poetry:
- Kenneth Slessor Prize for Poetry:

=== Canada awards and honors ===
- Archibald Lampman Award: Stephen Brockwell, All of Us Reticent, Here, Together
- Atlantic Poetry Prize: Jennifer Houle, The Back Channels
- 2017 Governor General's Awards: Richard Harrison, On Not Losing My Father's Ashes in the Flood (English), Louise Dupré, La Main hantée (French)
- Griffin Poetry Prize:
  - Canada: Jordan Abel, Injun
  - International: Alice Oswald, Falling Awake
  - Lifetime Recognition Award (presented by the Griffin trustees): Frank Bidart
- Latner Writers' Trust Poetry Prize: Louise Bernice Halfe
- Gerald Lampert Award: Ingrid Ruthig, This Being
- Pat Lowther Award: Sue Sinclair, Heaven's Thieves
- Prix Alain-Grandbois: Marie-Célie Agnant, Femmes des terres brûlées
- Raymond Souster Award: Louise Bernice Halfe, Burning in this Midnight Dream
- Dorothy Livesay Poetry Prize: Adèle Barclay, If I Were in a Cage I'd Reach Out for You
- Prix Émile-Nelligan: François Guerrette, Constellation des grands brûlés

=== France awards and honors ===
- Prix Goncourt de la Poésie:

=== New Zealand awards and honors ===
- Prime Minister's Awards for Literary Achievement:
  - Fiction: Witi Tame Ihimaera-Smiler
  - Nonfiction: Peter Simpson
  - Poetry: Paula Green
- Montana New Zealand Book Awards (poetry category):

=== United Kingdom awards and honors ===
- Cholmondeley Award: Caroline Bergvall, Sasha Dugdale, Philip Gross, Paula Meehan
- Costa Award (formerly "Whitbread Awards") for poetry:
  - Shortlist: Kayo Chingonyi, Kumukanda; Helen Dunmore (d. June 5), Inside the Wave (also overall Book of the Year winner); Sinéad Morrissey, On Balance; Richard Osmond, Useful Verses
- English Association's Fellows' Poetry Prizes:
- Eric Gregory Award (for a collection of poems by a poet under the age of 30):
- Forward Poetry Prize:
  - Best Collection:
    - Shortlist:
  - Best First Collection:
    - Shortlist:
  - Best Poem:
    - Shortlist:
- Jerwood Aldeburgh First Collection Prize for poetry:
  - Shortlist:
- Manchester Poetry Prize:
- National Poet of Wales:
- National Poetry Competition 2017:
- Queen's Gold Medal for Poetry: Paul Muldoon
- T. S. Eliot Prize (United Kingdom and Ireland):
  - Shortlist (announced in November 2017): 2017 Short List
- The Times / Stephen Spender Prize for Poetry Translation:

=== United States awards and honors ===
- Arab American Book Award (The George Ellenbogen Poetry Award):
  - Honorable Mentions:
- Agnes Lynch Starrett Poetry Prize:
- Anisfield-Wolf Book Award:
- Best Translated Book Award (BTBA):
- Beatrice Hawley Award from Alice James Books:
- Bollingen Prize: to Jean Valentine
- Dwarf Stars Award: LeRoy Gorman for "aster than the speed of lightf"
- Elgin Award:
  - Jeannine Hall Gailey for Field Guide to the End of the World (book)
  - Neil Aitken for Leviathan (chapbook)
- Jackson Poetry Prize: to Patricia Spears Jones
  - Judges: Henri Cole, Kwame Dawes, and Mary Szybist
- Lambda Literary Award:
  - Gay Poetry:
  - Lesbian Poetry:
- Lenore Marshall Poetry Prize:
- Los Angeles Times Book Prize:
  - Finalists:
- National Book Award for Poetry (NBA):
  - NBA Finalists:
  - NBA Longlist:
  - NBA Judges:
- National Book Critics Circle Award for Poetry:
- The New Criterion Poetry Prize:
- Pulitzer Prize for Poetry (United States): to Tyehimba Jess for Olio
  - Finalists: XX by Campbell McGrath; Collected Poems: 1950-2012, by Adrienne Rich
- Wallace Stevens Award:
- Whiting Awards:
- PEN Award for Poetry in Translation:
- PEN Center USA 2017 Poetry Award:
- PEN/Voelcker Award for Poetry: (Judges: )
- Raiziss/de Palchi Translation Award:
- Rhysling Award:
  - Theodora Goss for Rose Child (Long)
  - Marge Simon for George Tecumseh Sherman's Ghosts (Short)
- Ruth Lilly Poetry Prize:
- Kingsley Tufts Poetry Award: Vievee Francis for Forest Primeval
- Kate Tufts Discovery Award: Phillip B. Williams for Thief in the Interior
- Walt Whitman Prize – – Judge:
- Yale Younger Series: Duy Doan for We Play a Game (Judge: Carl Phillips)

==== From the Poetry Society of America ====
- Frost Medal: to Susan Howe
- Shelley Memorial Award: to Gillian Conoley
- Writer Magazine/Emily Dickinson Award:
- Lyric Poetry Award:
- Alice Fay Di Castagnola Award:
- Louise Louis/Emily F. Bourne Student Poetry Award:
- George Bogin Memorial Award:
- Robert H. Winner Memorial Award:
- Cecil Hemley Memorial Award:
- Norma Farber First Book Award:
- Lucille Medwick Memorial Award:
- William Carlos Williams Award: (Judge: )
  - Finalists for WCW Award:

== Deaths ==
=== January – June ===
Birth years link to the corresponding "[year] in poetry" article:

- January 2 – John Berger, 90, English novelist, painter and art critic, and poet (b. 1926)
- January 25 – Harry Mathews, 86, American novelist and poet (b. 1930)
- February 5 – Thomas Lux, 70, American poet and teacher (b. 1946)
- February 8 – Tom Raworth, 78, British poet, visual artist, publisher, and teacher (b. 1938)
- March 10 – Mari Evans, 93, American poet. (b. 1923)
- March 16 – Wojciech Młynarski, 75, Polish poet, singer and songwriter (born 1941)
- March 17 – Derek Walcott, 87, Saint Lucian poet and playwright, Nobel Laureate in 1992 (b. 1930)
- March 22 – Joanne Kyger, 82, American poet who had ties to the poets of Black Mountain, the San Francisco Renaissance, and the Beat Generation, (b. 1934)
- April 1 – Yevgeny Yevtushenko, Russian poet, 84 (b. 1933)
- May 24 – Denis Johnson, American poet (The Incognito Lounge), novelist (Tree of Smoke), and short story writer (Jesus' Son), 67 (b. 1947).
- June 5 – Helen Dunmore, English poet, novelist and children's writer, 64 (born 1952)
- June 8 - Shinichiro Hagihara, Japanese tanka poet

=== July – December ===
- November 15 – Michelle Boisseau, 62, American poet (b. 1955)

== See also ==
- Poetry
- List of years in poetry
- List of poetry awards
