= Talking to the Dead =

Talking to the Dead may refer to:

- Talking to the Dead (album), by Rosemary's Babies
- Talking to the Dead (TV series)
- "Talking to the Dead" (New Tricks), a 2004 television episode
- Talking to the Dead, the first episode of Penn & Teller: Bullshit!
- Talking to the Dead, a 1993 short story collection by Sylvia Watanabe
- Talking to the Dead (novel), a 1996 novel by Helen Dunmore
- Talking to the Dead, a 2007 poetry collection by Elaine Feinstein
- Talking to the Dead, a 2011 book by Rosemary Ellen Guiley

== See also ==
- Séance, an attempt to communicate with spirits
