= Minuscule 1356 =

11th-century Greek minuscule manuscript of the New Testament

- New Testament manuscript
- Text: Gospels
- Date: 11th century
- Script: Greek
- Now at: Walters Art Museum
- Size: 34.5 cm by 24.5 cm
- Type: Byzantine text-type
- Category: V
- Note: marginalia

Minuscule 1356 (in the Gregory-Aland numbering), ε1087 (von Soden), is an 11th-century Greek minuscule manuscript of the New Testament on parchment. The manuscript has complex contents.

== Description ==
The codex contains the text of the four Gospels, on 303 parchment leaves (size 34.5 cm by 24.5 cm). The Gospels are placed in the order: Matthew, Luke, Mark and John. The same order has Minuscule 392 and 498.

The text is written in two columns per page, 22 lines per page. The large initial letters are in red. The manuscripts is ornamented. It contains miniatures of the four Apostles.

The text is divided according to the κεφαλαια (chapters), whose numbers are given at the margin, and their τιτλοι (titles) at the top of the pages. There is also another division according to the smaller Ammonian Sections (in Mark 241 sections, the last numbered section in 16:20), whose numbers are given at the margin with references to the Eusebian Canons (written below Ammonian Section numbers). It contains many notes made by later hand.

It contains the Epistula ad Carpianum at the beginning, Eusebian Canon tables, Prolegomena, tables of the κεφαλαια (tables of contents) before each Gospel. It contains subscriptions at the end of each Gospel with numbers of verses and numbers of στιχοι. According to Hermann von Soden it contains also lectionary markings (for church readings) at the margin and pictures.

== Text ==
The Greek text of the codex is a representative of the Byzantine text-type. Hermann von Soden classified it to the textual family K^{x}. Kurt Aland placed it in Category V.

According to the Claremont Profile Method it represents the textual cluster M106 in Luke 1 and Luke 20, but it is very weak member of this cluster in Luke 1. In Luke 10 no profile was made.

The Pericope Adulterae (John 7:53-8:11) is placed at the end of the Gospel of John.

== History ==
Gregory dated the manuscript to the 12 or 13th century, other palaeographers dated it to the 10th or 11th century. Currently the manuscript is dated by the INTF to the 11th century.

The manuscript was added to the list of New Testament manuscripts by Gregory (1356^{e}). Gregory saw it in 1906. The manuscript was first described by Athanasios Papadopoulos-Kerameus in 1897. It was examined and described by Kenneth Willis Clark in 1937.

Formerly the manuscript was housed in Jerusalem (Anastaseos 7). Then it was brought to United States. Currently the manuscript is housed at the Walters Art Museum (Ms. W. 532), in Baltimore.

== See also ==
- List of New Testament minuscules (1001–2000)
- Biblical manuscript
- Textual criticism
- Minuscule 831
- Minuscule 1076
