= The Siege (Dunmore novel) =

2001 historical novel by Helen Dunmore

- First edition (with quote from Antony Beevor)
- Author: Helen Dunmore
- Language: English
- Genre: Historical fiction
- Publisher: Viking
- Publication date: June 2001
- Publication place: United Kingdom
- Media type: Print (hardback & paperback)
- Pages: 293
- ISBN: 0-670-89718-3
- Followed by: The Betrayal

The Siege is a 2001 historical novel by English writer Helen Dunmore. It is set in Leningrad just before and during the Siege of Leningrad by German forces in World War II. The book was shortlisted for the Orange Prize in 2002 and for the 2001 Whitbread Prize.

The Siege is the first of a two-book series. The second, The Betrayal was published in 2010 and is also set in Leningrad, but later in 1952.

== Synopsis ==
Anna is a nursery-school assistant who lives in a dacha outside Leningrad with her father Mikhail and her young brother Kolya. Germany invades the Soviet Union in June 1941 and approaches Leningrad. Anna's family, and thousands of others, flee to the safety of the city. Mikhail joins the People's Volunteers to fight the advancing Germans, while Anna and thousands of other women dig anti-tank traps on the city's outskirts. By September the German army overruns Leningrad's outer defences and encircle the city, cutting off its food supplies.

With winter approaching and strict food rationing, life becomes a struggle for the city's inhabitants. Andrei, a medical student from the hospital, brings a wounded Mikhail home to Anna's apartment. Frequent visits by Andrei to care for her father brings them close and he moves in with her and Kolya. The winter of 1941–42 is brutal and they struggle with freezing temperatures and the threat of starvation. Limited food supplies arrive via the ice road over the frozen Lake Ladoga, but they are nowhere near sufficient to feed the city of over three million people. Mikhail never recovers from his injuries and dies. Anna and Andrei cannot bury him because they are too weak.

By May 1942 the German siege of Leningrad is still in place, but with the spring thaw, more supply routes open up to the city bringing in vital food and supplies. Rationing eases and while the city's survivors are still hungry, they are no longer starving. Anna, Andrei and Kolya have survived, and though they are still weak from malnutrition, they enjoy the outdoors in the sunshine. The nursery-school has re-opened and Anna is busy again. They bury Anna's father alongside thousands of others. Half of Leningrad's population died that winter.

== Reception ==
In The New York Times, Janice P. Nimura described The Siege as an "epic" and said that the language used was "elegantly, starkly beautiful". She wrote that Dunmore does not resort to sentimentality, yet still conveys "a fierce note of humanism". Nimura felt that the book is "quieter and more powerful" than her previous historical novel, A Spell of Winter, and added, "There is no need here to manufacture fear. History is frightening enough."

John Mullan, in The Guardian, focused on the importance of the basic need of sustenance to stay alive in the early days of the siege, and described the novel as an "agonizing read". He said that at its heart the book is about "the realism of the senses", particularly that of taste, and how they slowly shut down as cold and hunger set in. Mullan wrote, "It is a kind of insensate blankness in the minds of the novel's characters."

In another review in The Guardian, Isobel Montgomery found The Siege to be "delicately evocative and immensely readable", yet "in some primary way indigestible." She felt that when it comes to writing about Leningrad and the blockade, Dunmore has "borrowed rather than truly inhabited the history". Montgomery wrote that while the book's characters are well crafted and believable, they tend to "fall into expected patterns" when dealing with "real places and events". Montgomery concluded that while Leningrad's history is a rich source of material to write about, "it is questionable whether The Siege is equal to that depth, or ever probes beyond its obvious paths."

The Guardian ranked The Siege No. 92 in its list of 100 Best Books of the 21st century.

== Works cited ==
- Dunmore, Helen (2002) [2001]. The Siege (e-book ed.). Penguin Books. ISBN 978-0-141-92497-7.
