= Tetralogy (disambiguation) =

A tetralogy is a set of four dramatic or literary works.

Tetralogy may also refer to:

- Ingo tetralogy, a series of children's novels by author Helen Dunmore.
- Ware Tetralogy, a series of science fiction novels by author Rudy Rucker
- Tetralogy (album), an album by trombonist Paul Rutherford
- Tetralogy of Fallot, a congenital heart defect
