= The Deep (Dunmore novel) =

2007 novel by Helen Dunmore

- Author: Helen Dunmore
- Language: English
- Series: Ingo tetralogy
- Genre: Children's Novel
- Publisher: HarperCollins Children's Books
- Publication date: 1 May 2007
- Publication place: United Kingdom
- Media type: Print (hardcover)
- Pages: 336 pp
- ISBN: 0-00-720491-4
- OCLC: 81452773
- Preceded by: The Tide Knot
- Followed by: The Crossing of Ingo

The Deep is a 2007 children's novel by English writer Helen Dunmore. As the third book of the Ingo tetralogy, it is preceded by Ingo (2005) and The Tide Knot (2006) followed by The Crossing of Ingo (2008).

== Plot summary ==
A devastating flood has torn through the worlds of Air and Ingo, and now, deep in the ocean, a monster is stirring. Mer legend says that only those with dual blood—half Mer, half human—can overcome the Kraken that stirs in The Deep.

Sapphire returns to the Deep with the assistance of a whale to face a creature, accompanied by her brother Conor and her Mer friend Faro. Those with pure Mer blood cannot enter the Deep.

Sapphire has moved back into the cottage by the cove, and is visiting Ingo all the time. When she is summoned to an assembly of the Mer she learns that the Kraken, a creature with the power to destroy their world, has awakened. Sapphire makes a deal with the Mer: if she and Conor help put the Kraken back to sleep their father will have the choice to leave Ingo. Ervys, a spokesperson (self-proclaimed leader, which the Mer do not have, as it causes problems) for the Mer, is outraged by this deal but gives his approval so the Mer will be safe. Sapphire, Conor and Faro (Faro should not be able to go to The Deep, but in Saldowr's mirror, he sees that he is not pure Mer, but part Human) go into the Deep with the help of the whale (that saves Sapphire from the Deep in The Tide Knot) to find the Kraken, and put him to sleep. It is not revealed what the Kraken really is, but it is clearly a shapeshifter. After a battle of minds, Sapphire manages to get the Kraken to sleep, and with Conor and Faro she goes back to the Mer to tell them the good news. Ervys is still furious especially when Faro asks Sapphire to make the crossing of Ingo with him. She agrees, but only on the condition that Conor may go too. Faro counters by insisting that his sister will also go. Although Sapphire does not want Elvira and Conor together, she agrees.

When Sapphire and Conor return home they are horrified when their mother and her boyfriend Roger tell them they are all moving to Australia for three months. After talking with her friend Rainbow and Granny Carne Sapphire tells Conor she does not want to leave, and they tell their mother and Roger that they won't be going. Jennie and Roger reluctantly decide to go without them.

The final chapter ends with Faro and Sapphire making Deublek, or friendship bracelets out of their hair.

== Reception ==
Booklist reviewer Anne O'Malley praised the author's "fine writing", while Ruth Bamford found the book "easy to read and beautifully written". In a positive review, The Horn Book Magazine's Anita L. Burkham wrote, "Sapphire's picturesque life on the coast of Cornwall and the enchanting and perilous world underwater are depicted with equal depth and resonance in Dunmore's commanding prose."

The Sunday Times's Nicolette Jones liked the book's "sensual, descriptive prose that evokes the watery kingdom with conviction" and said the "characters are clear-cut and written with exuberance". The book was reviewed by Magpies, School Librarian, and Voice of Youth Advocates.
