= The Tide Knot =

2006 novel by Helen Dunmore

- Author: Helen Dunmore
- Language: English
- Genre: Children's Novel
- Publisher: HarperCollins Children's Books
- Publication date: 2 May 2006
- Publication place: United Kingdom
- Media type: Print (hardcover)
- Pages: 336 pp
- ISBN: 0-00-720489-2
- OCLC: 63395497
- Preceded by: Ingo
- Followed by: The Deep

The Tide Knot is a children's novel by English writer Helen Dunmore, published in 2006 and the second of the Ingo tetralogy (preceded by Ingo and followed by The Deep and The Crossing of Ingo). It won the Nestlé Children's Book Prize Silver Award and was longlisted for the Carnegie Medal.

== Plot ==
Sapphire, Conor, and their mother have moved to St Pirans with Roger, leaving behind their cottage by the sea, where their dad disappeared two years ago. Conor has adapted to this new life, but Sapphire cannot. She is withdrawn and restless, and her only relief is the underwater world of Ingo. She goes there more frequently, even without Conor, who has given up going, and prefers his life in the air.

A new couple are living in their old house. The woman on crutches has the look of Ingo on her face but does not know of the world beneath the sea. The Lady- Gloria asks a lot of questions and they talk a lot. The lady would like to see Sapphire again so they can go to the cove.

One evening Sapphire takes her beloved dog Sadie for a walk along the sea, but the call of Ingo is too strong, so she leaves Sadie up on the pavement and dives in. Faro is there. She only stays a minute but when she goes back to Sadie her dog seems shaken and ill.

Sapphire's mother says not to worry: the dog will be fine. Sapphire skips school and takes her dog to see Granny Carne, a magical old lady. She phones home from Granny Carne's and tells her mother she's staying over and won't be back till morning. That night, Sapphire hears her dads voice and follows it to a deep pond. Sapphire sees her dad but in mer. He tells her that the tide knot is loose, but he can't stay long and leaves shortly after. The next day her dog is healed but Sapphire is in trouble with her mother.

Soon after, Conor and Sapphire go back to Ingo to find out more about her father. They swim in a rogue current. Whilst Faro rescues Conor, Sapphire is carried into the deep. She wakes up in blackness, but a whale helps her back to Ingo. There Sapphire and Conor see in a mirror-like thing a mer woman with a mer baby. The woman smiles at someone in the corner of the mirror – their father smiling lovingly at the woman and the baby.

Feeling replaced and sad, they are about to leave when they learn of the tide knot, a stone that controls the tides that is becoming loose. Shortly, after they return, the tide knot loosens and nearly the entire town floods. As the houses are swallowed up by the flood water, Sapphire's mother is ill. Sapphire, her mother and her friend Rainbow go up to the attic. Sapphire jumps out of the window into the sea where she meets Conor and Faro. Sapphire is slammed against a wall and her leg begins to bleed. Conor calls Elvira, a healer. Elvira heals Sapphire and together the four help Saldowr, the wisest of the mer and the keeper of the tide knot, to put the broken pieces back together to restore the tide knot. Saldowr is weak but they manage to do it with Conor's power of reading the stone. The flood slowly recedes.

Conor and Sapphire return to the rescue centre where they are re-united with their mother. They end happily with Sapphire and her dog together.

== Reception ==
The Tide Knot received reviews from Booklist and Kirkus Reviews.

The novel won the silver award for the 2006 Nestlé Children's Book Prize for children ages 9–11, and was longlisted for the 2007 Carnegie Medal.
