= Uncial 054 =

- New Testament manuscript
- Name: Codex Barberini
- Text: Gospel of John
- Date: 8th century
- Script: Greek
- Found: Barberini 17th
- Now at: Vatican Library
- Size: 29 x 18.5 cm
- Type: Byzantine text-type
- Category: V

Uncial 054 (in the Gregory-Aland numbering), ε 59 (Soden), also known as Codex Barberini, is a Greek uncial manuscript of the New Testament, dated paleographically to the 8th century.

== Description ==
The codex contains part of the Gospel of John (16:3-19:41), with a commentary on 6 parchment leaves (29 cm by 18.5 cm). It is written in one column per page, 36 lines per page, in about 27 letters in line. The letters are small, the parchment is thick, the ink is brown. It contains lectionary markings at the margin (for liturgical service).

The text is divided according to the Ammonian Sections, whose numbers are given in the margin of the text, but without references to the Eusebian Canons.

It belongs to the same manuscript to which minuscule codex 392 belongs (folios 7-391).

The Greek text of this codex is a representative of the Byzantine text-type, with some non-Byzantine readings. Aland, with some hesitation, placed it in Category V.

== History ==
Currently it is dated by the INTF to the 8th century.

It was found in the 17th century by Cardinal Francesco Barberini (hence name of the codex). It was examined by Scholz. The text of the codex was published by Tischendorf in 1846 (Monumenta sacra).

The codex is now located in the Vatican Library (Barberini Gr. 521, fol. 1-6).

== See also ==
- List of New Testament uncials
- Textual criticism
