= Ingo tetralogy =

Children's book series by Helen Dunmore

The Ingo tetralogy is a series of four children's novels, set in Cornwall, by British author Helen Dunmore. The four books are, in chronological order, Ingo, The Tide Knot, The Deep and The Crossing of Ingo. The first book was nominated for the 2008 Booktrust Teenage Prize.

There are 4 books in this series, written by Helen Dunmore.

== Books ==
=== Ingo ===
Ingo was published 5 September 2005. It was generally well received by critics.

In the novel, Sapphire is faced with her father's (Matthew Trewhella, who is coincidentally related to the Matthew Trewhella associated with the Zennor mermaid) sudden disappearance when he left Sapphire's mother after an argument. All they found was his boat, the Peggy Gordan, capsized and with nothing in it. Many people had different theories about how her father disappeared, how he had run away with another woman, faked his own death or had died. Nevertheless, they had the funeral anyway, where Sapphire and Conor make a pact to never stop looking for their father.

A year later Sapphire follows Conor down to the cove after he has been missing for nearly a day. There she meets Faro, one of the mer, he is prideful and patriotic to his people and invites her to Ingo, an underwater world where the mysterious mer people dwell. At first she has to keep a hold of his hand to breathe, but after a while she can do it by herself. Time runs differently in Ingo and when she finally resurfaces she realizes she has been gone for two days when she sees Conor waiting up for her on the cliff having slept there for the night. Her mother was away so she didn't notice that Sapphire was missing, but after that disappearance Conor is against everything to do with Ingo.

Time goes by and Sapphire is affected by Ingo more and more; craving salt, hearing her name called by the sea and finding it hard to breathe once she resurfaces from the water. The only thing that can stop her from her yearning from Ingo is Granny Carne (a wizened old woman whom the village folk go to with their troubles). From Granny Carne that both Sapphire and Conor learn of their Mer blood.

By this time Sapphire's mother has acquired a boyfriend: Roger. Roger plans on taking a dive at the Bawns which is the sacred resting place of the dead in Ingo: Limina. Ingo will do everything to protect it. Sapphire and Conor go on a rescue mission to save Roger and Gray (Roger's diving partner) from the bull seals who protect Limina. Conor hears Limina's song, the song that is supposed to be heard when one is dying. Conor repeats it to the bull seals and they stop attacking Roger and Gray. Then Conor and Sapphire haul Roger and Gray into the boat with the help of Faro and Elvira, Conor's mer friend, and wait for them to recover.

=== The Tide Knot ===
The Tide Knot was published 2 May 2006. It received reviews from Booklist and Kirkus Reviews. The novel won the silver award for the 2006 Nestlé Children's Book Prize for children ages 9–11, and was longlisted for the 2007 Carnegie Medal.

In the novel, Sapphire now lives in St Pirans with her mother, Conor and Roger. Conor adapts easily to the new city life whilst Sapphire is becoming more withdrawn and turning to Ingo. One evening she walks Sadie down to the beach and leaves her, going into Ingo alone to meet Faro. When she comes back she finds Sadie in a terrible state and skips school the next day to take him to Granny Carne to see if Granny Carne can do anything for him. She stays overnight. While she is staying at Granny Carne's house she hears her name whispered in the language of Ingo. She follows it and finds her father, now one of the mer, in a river who had traveled all the way just to warn her that the tide knot is loose.

Conor and Sapphire travel with Faro to meet his mentor, Saldowr. There Sapphire is whisked away from Faro and Conor by a rogue current into the deep with no knowledge with which way is up and which way is down. She is then brought back to lighter waters by a whale. There she meets up with Conor and Saldowr, but she cannot meet up with Faro because he is severely injured and rests in Saldowr's cave, a place where only the mer can entre. Conor inquires after his father and they learn that his father is married and has a child. Just before they leave they learn of the Tide Knot, which has become loose, and shortly after they arrive home it loosens completely; unleashing a terrible tidal wave that floods the town.

She finds her mother and they, with Rainbow (Sapphire's somewhat strange friend) hide away in the attic. When they are all asleep Sapphire jumps out of the window and finds Faro with Conor. The currents under the flooded town are strong, and Sapphire gets slammed against a wall. They call Elvira, a healer. Once Sapphire is healed, they swim to Saldowr, who looks old and weak. The tide knot is undone and something else has broken out of its cage, and shattered the pieces. Sapphire, Conor, Elvira and Faro all find and put together the knot, sealing the Tide Knot back into its place.

Sapphire and Conor go home to find it in tatters. They get to move back to their village and move back into their old house.

=== The Deep ===
The Deep was published 1 May 2007. It received a review from Booklist.

The novel follows the devastation of the Tide Knot. The Kraken awakens and it is said that only half mer and half humans can overcome the Kraken; a terrible monster who can only be put back to sleep if one boy and one girl be sacrificed for him.

Faro invites Sapphire to a mer assembly with Conor. Once there Conor and Sapphire make a deal that they will overcome the kraken if their father can have the choice to leave Ingo because they believe their father is there against his will. Evrys, the mer's spokesperson, is irritated with their proposal but agrees because Conor and Sapphire are the only ones who can save the mer.

Faro (because he's not all mer), Sapphire and Conor descend into the deep with the help of the whale. They face the Kraken who's a shape shifter and have a battle of wits. Sapphire finally puts him back to sleep using the rowan berries which Granny Carne had given her before she went down to face the kraken. They all go back to tell the mer the good news. Faro asks Sapphire to make the crossing of Ingo, a trip around the whole globe which the mer make when they come of age, with him. She agrees and asks if Conor can join them which Faro agrees with. Evrys is furious because it was only a mer tradition. Faro says that Elvira will come too and Sapphire is a little uneasy with Conor and Elvira together.

=== The Crossing of Ingo ===
The Crossing of Ingo was published 5 May 2008. It received reviews from the Liverpool Echo and The Times, and was longlisted for the 2008 Booktrust Teenage Prize.

In the novel, Sapphire and Conor accept the call to the crossing of Ingo. They meet up with Faro who tells them that Evrys is adamant that they don't accept the call and that he has many followers among the mer who will cause trouble and stop them from making the crossing whether they’re killed or not . The future of air and Ingo depend on Sapphire's and Conor's success.

Sapphire's mother and Roger are in Australia for 3 months leaving them home alone with Rainbow and her brother checking up on them every so often. With their parents in Australia Conor and Sapphire have just enough time to make the crossing.

They hear the call a couple of weeks after their parents leave and know what it is and know they must answer. One day, when they come back home after an outing they find seagulls nesting on their roof they believe the seagulls are sent by Evrys. Later, the seagulls attack Sadie, Sapphire's dog. Sapphire takes the dog to Granny Carne who heals him and promises to look after him while they’re in Ingo.

They join up with Faro after a little trouble getting past the cove which Evrys and his followers had turned into a Porth Cas keeping them out. The three then go to the assembly chambers and hide from the Evrys followers till they are either accepted or rejected to make the crossing by the mer. They are all accepted, but when Sapphire and Conor went up their father kept silent in rejection. They meet again with Faro and Elvira outside deciding on the best plan of action so they would not be stopped by Evrys' followers.

They are attacked by Évrys's sharks and saved by dolphins. Conor, Elvira, Sapphire and Faro decide to head North instead of South (the mer's traditional route).

Conor and Sapphire meet their father who explains his rejection as he wanted them to be safe. He tries to come with them but when denied he wishes them luck.

So they head South taking the currents until they’re under the ice of the north where they separate; Conor with Elvira and Sapphire with Faro. Sapphire meets her Atka, a strange mer like creature who dwells on the ice. Her Atka wants to touch her but she doesn't let her because she has a bad feeling about what her Atka will do to her. Sapphire and Faro finally meet up with Conor and Elvira they head South again as they travel around the world. Elvira grows desperate to go back to the North and Sapphire thinks it's something to do with the Atka. Sapphire convinces Elvira to stay with them until the end of the journey. Elvira agrees.

They meet a strange group of mer who have short hair and keep to kelp forests. They’ve never seen humans with mer in them before nor have they seen Faro's type of mer before. After the brief strange encounter they keep on going.

Sapphire calls dolphins to take them part of the way of the journey. They stop briefly where Sapphire meets her friend the Whale's daughter who has had a baby. They take the flight of the dolphins all the way back to the lost islands (islands buried underwater with huge settlements still standing). They’re attacked by Evrys and his followers. Sapphire's father comes and joins them and is killed in battle. Sapphire and Conor make the complete circle and see their father returned to Limina. They all head home.

== Characters ==
- Sapphire Trewhella: Known as 'Sapphy', the narrator of the books, a young girl with a temper and a connection to the sea. She has long hair, which is similar to the colour of Faro's. She has a Labrador puppy named Sadie and a lovely singing voice. Granny Carne has told her that she is in more danger than Conor of being pulled into Ingo, and although Faro has hinted at it, she refuses to believe that she may become Mer. She always wears the deublek that Faro made her.
- Conor Trewhella: Sapphire's older brother, who has a levelheaded and calm approach to problems to balance Sapphy's hot-tempered one. Since he and Elvira may or may not be in love, Sapphire worries that he may abandon the human world completely and become Mer, as their father did. Although he does not sing often, it is revealed that he also has a strong singing voice. At the beginning of the series he appears to have difficulty going between Ingo and the Earth, and that he has a stronger connection to Earth. At the end of the Deep, Sapphire is terrified to learn that he has started to swim as if he has a tail. It is also revealed that he can talk to land animals, while Sapphire cannot.
- Faro: A Mer boy who is the first to show Sapphy the world of Ingo. He is described as having dark hair, brown eyes, perfectly white teeth, and suntanned skin. He is offended when Sapphire calls him a mermaid ("do you go to school with a lot of nice maids?"). Sapphire compares his tail to that of a seal, however on the covers of the novels it looks as if he has a seal's tail with a whale's fins. He is intensely proud of being Mer, however he later learns that he also has human blood in him. He always hints (or hopes) that Sapphire may become Mer, and while he calls her his sister, it is unknown whether he feels a romantic or brotherly love towards her. He is also Saldowr's apprentice and protects him with his heart and soul. Always wears a matching deublek to Sapphire's. He likes to tease, and calls Sapphire "Little Sister".
- Elvira: A mer girl that Conor has a crush on, and Faro's sister. She is said to have curly black hair, and is beautiful. Elvira is a healer in training.
- Mathew Trewhella: Father of Conor and Sapphire. Disappeared at sea when Sapphy was ten and Conor was twelve. He has since remarried, and is now a full Mer with a young son.
- Jennie Trewhella: Sapphire and Conor's mother. Has a fear of the sea and worries about her children getting so close to it. She is in a relationship with Roger.
- Granny Carne: A wise old woman full of Earth magic who makes sure Sapphire and Conor don't get so engrossed in Ingo they forget the Air. Saldowr is her Mer counterpart in role.
- Saldowr: The Ingo equivalent to Granny Carne. Believes Ingo and Air need to live peacefully side by side. He is Faro's mentor and guardian of the tide knot.
- Roger: Jennie's new boyfriend. A diver, originally from Australia. Disliked by Sapphire at first, but she grows to realise and accept that he is a good person and good for her mother.
- Sadie: Sapphire's golden retriever which she receives in the second book. In the fourth book Sadie is Sapphire's only link to 'air'.
- Rainbow: Sapphire's strange friend who she meets in the second book.
- Evrys: A cruel, arrogant leader who tries to take control of the mer.
