= Thomas Rodd =

Thomas Rodd (1763–1822) was an English bookseller, antiquarian and Hispanist; Rodd purchased some Greek manuscripts for the British Museum (e.g. codices: Minuscule 272, Minuscule 498).

He translated some old ballads into English: Ancient Ballads from the Civil Wars of Granada and the Twelve Peers of France (London, 1801). He also translated part 1 of a Spanish historical novel by Gines Perez de Hita as The Civil Wars of Granada (London, 1803). Then he published an adaptation of the Historia Caroli Magni: History of Charles the Great and Orlando, ascribed to Archbishop Turpin; translated from the Latin in Spanheim’s Lives of ecclesiastical writers: together with English metrical versions of the most celebrated ancient Spanish ballads relating to the twelve peers of France mentioned in Don Quixote (London: Printed for T. Rodd and T. Boosey, 1812); Rodd translated Damián López de Tortajada, Los doce pares de Francia (Twelve Peers of France).
