= Minuscule 830 =

- New Testament manuscript
- Text: Gospels †
- Date: 13th century
- Script: Greek
- Now at: Biblioteca della Badia
- Size: 23 cm by 17 cm
- Type: Byzantine text-type
- Category: V
- Note: —

Minuscule 830 (in the Gregory-Aland numbering), ε310 (von Soden), is a 13th-century Greek minuscule manuscript of the New Testament on parchment.

== Description ==
The codex contains the text of the four Gospels, on 222 parchment leaves (size 23 cm by 17 cm), with some lacunae. It lacks texts of Matthew 10:15-25:3; Mark 14:28-16:20; John 18:39-21:25. The text of Matthew 4:3-5:5 was supplied by a later hand. The text is written in one column per page, 26 lines per page.

The text is divided according to the κεφαλαια (chapters), and according to the smaller Ammonian Sections. The numbers of the κεφαλαια are given at the margin, and their τιτλοι (titles) at the top of the pages. The numbers of the Ammonian Sections are given with a references to the Eusebian Canons (written under Ammonian Sections) at the margin.

It contains Prolegomena, the tables of the κεφαλαια (table of contents) precede each Gospel.

== Text ==
The Greek text of the codex is a representative of the Byzantine text-type. Hermann von Soden classified it to the textual family K^{x}. Kurt Aland placed it in Category V. According to Gregory it could be related to the textual family f^{13}.

According to the Claremont Profile Method it represents the textual family K^{x} in Luke 1 and Luke 20. In Luke 10 it represents textual cluster M27.

== History ==
C. R. Gregory and F. H. A. Scrivener dated the manuscript to the 13th century. Currently the manuscript is dated by the INTF to the 13th century.

The name of scribe was Arsenios. The manuscript once belonged to Simeon, a monk. It was examined and described by Antonio Rocci in 1882. It was added to the list of New Testament manuscripts by Scrivener (628) and Gregory (830^{e}). Gregory saw it in 1886.

Currently the manuscript is housed at the Biblioteca della Badia (A' α. 8), in Grottaferrata.

== See also ==
- List of New Testament minuscules
- Biblical manuscript
- Textual criticism
- Minuscule 831
