= Mourning Ruby =

2003 novel by Helen Dunmore

- First edition
- Author: Helen Dunmore
- Publisher: Viking Books
- Publication date: 2003
- Pages: 309
- ISBN: 0-670-91449-5

Mourning Ruby is the eighth novel by Helen Dunmore.

== Plot introduction ==
Rebecca was abandoned by her mother in a shoebox in the backyard of an Italian restaurant when she was two years old. She is adopted by foster parents and thirty years later marries Adam, a consultant neonatologist dealing with premature babies. She gives birth to Ruby and starts a new life for herself and her small family. But a tragedy suddenly upsets the calm order of her life and changes its course forever. The novel traces the harrowing life of Rebecca with several interesting temporal juxtapositions and flashbacks that add to its complexity.

== Plot summary ==
Prologue

The story opens with Rebecca and Ruby walking along the coast road from St Just to Zennor in Cornwall. This is during the time of a visit to Cornwall with Adam to visit his relative’s grave.

Part One – Shoebox Story

Rebecca recounts the discovery of herself as a foundling by Lucia, after she is abandoned by her young mother outside an Italian restaurant. This is at a time when she is working for Mr Damiano, a mysterious ex-circus owner who has set up a chain of boutique hotels that Rebecca helps to manage. On a flight back to England, one of the plane’s engines fails and it is forced to return to New York. It is whilst standing on the tarmac that Rebecca decides to hand in her notice, having lost all zest for her work. Rebecca’s story goes back to the time when she was sharing a flat with Joe, an intellectual who is writing a book about Nadezhda Alliluyeva, the thirty-one-year-old wife of Stalin who committed suicide in 1932. He befriends Adam through a shared interest in chess and he and Rebecca fall in love and then marry. Joe decides to move to Moscow to further his research and lives with Olya, and Rebecca and Adam decide to visit him with Ruby. He tells them about Joseph Stalin’s character and the wave of fear that gripped Russia during his dictatorship. On their return to England, they decide to visit Adam’s grandmother’s grave at Barnoon Cemetery in Cornwall and Rebecca is happy that Ruby will have ancestors that she herself can never have.

It is on their return to London on a warm August evening that tragedy strikes when Ruby is run down by a motorist. Rebecca cannot reconcile herself to her daughter’s loss and the intensity of her grief leads to their eventual separation. It is at this time that Rebecca’s shattered life is restored through her work for Mr Damiano, who tells her his life story as the son of poor trapeze artists. Joe, meanwhile, is working on his second novel – about the time of Stalin’s retreat to his dacha when Hitler invaded Russia. After talking to an Afghan war veteran, he decides to abandon the task and goes to Vancouver Island to write a novel. Rebecca leaves London and, on a visit to St Ives, starts working as a waitress in a local café. Here, she is visited by Joe who gives her a copy of his story.

Part Two – Boomdiara

This part is a narrative of Joe’s novel which describes the life of Florence, who works in Madame Blanche’s brothel to support her young daughter, Claire. It is here that she meets Will, a World War One air force pilot, with whom she falls in love. Joe writes to Rebecca that Florence’s character is based in part on her own.

Part Three – Flight

In this part the stories of Rebecca and Adam and Florence and Will become intertwined. Adam visits Rebecca in her boarding house and they become reunited and return to Ruby who is buried in the same grave as her great grandmother. Will’s plane is shot up in a fire fight with a German Albatros and he has to cut his engine to prevent his plane going down as a flamer.

== Historical and personal references ==
In the novel, Joe is fascinated by the Russian poet Osip Mandelstam and his relationship with Stalin. He is one of Dunmore's favorite poets and is cited as defining poetry as "an aeroplane in full flight giving birth to another aeroplane". On 2 August 1938, Mandelstam was sentenced to five years in correction camps. The official cause of his death in a camp is an unspecified illness. As the author herself says about Russia: "I didn't choose Russia but Russia chose me. I had been fascinated from an early age by the culture, the language, the literature and the history to the place."

And about her novel: "Mourning Ruby is not a flat landscape: it is more like a box with pictures painted on every face. And each face is also a door which opens, I hope, to take the reader deep into the book."

== External sources ==
- The Independent, Living dolls and lost children, 17 October 2003.
- Bookreporter.com, review of Mourning Ruby
