= The Greatcoat =

2012 novel by Helen Dunmore

- First edition
- Author: Helen Dunmore
- Language: English
- Publisher: Arrow Books
- Publication date: 2 February 2012
- Publication place: England
- Media type: Print
- Pages: 208
- ISBN: 0-099564-93-9

The Greatcoat is a 2012 ghost novel by English writer Helen Dunmore, This imprint is a partnership between Arrow Books and Hammer Film Productions.

== Background ==
Dunmore writes in the Afterword:

When I received an email from Hammer asking if I would consider writing a ghost or horror novella...I had never attempted anything longer. Ghosts fascinated me and stir my imagination in a way that horror does not, and soon ideas begin to develop... Suddenly it came to me that the story would begin with my father's RAF greatcoat...As a small child in the 1950s I remember a particular blend of stoicism, optimism and weariness. There was a determinism that life would be better, after all the sacrifices after the war. But in almost every family there were losses, deaths, injuries and traumas which were not talked about much, if at all. It is this silence that I wanted to write about in The Greatcoat. Silence about the past does not mean that the past has died down... We may hide from the past, but it will always find us.

== Plot ==
Set in 1952 in a small town in the East Riding of Yorkshire near an abandoned RAF airbase, it concerns a newly-wed doctor's wife, Isabel Carey. They live in cold, cramped rooms below their sinister landlady whose footsteps above them pace constantly. Isabel finds a greatcoat in a cupboard and finds comfort in it, as her husband is often out on call looking after ill patients. Then a young RAF pilot Alec, taps on her window, Isabel seems to know him and they begin an affair, moving between reality and the nearby WW2 airfield. Alec pilots a Lancaster bomber called K-Katie, then Isabel falls pregnant...

== Reception ==
Katy Guest in The Independent writes "This novel adds an extra layer of unreality to fiction, and calls for a reader who is really willing to suspend disbelief. In that sense, it is a perfect ghost story, that will reward Hammer horror readers as well as open-minded Dunmore fans. This ghostly, literary war story could be the start of a beautiful friendship.

Sarah Moss in The Guardian explains that 'Dunmore has a sharp eye for the hairline cracks in a new marriage, for what is not said as passion begins to dwindle. We all know that young men die in war, and that they are brave and skilled and also frightened, and that women's lives are distorted by these deaths. Dunmore's gift is to use a finely drawn domestic setting to show the great events of European history on a human scale. She doesn't need "horror" to spook her readers - our past is bad enough.'

Alison Flood praises the novel in The Sunday Times: 'Dunmore is on fine form here, wielding her skill at bringing history to life in the small, dismal details of the post-war period, and showing off her talents as a poet in her mesmerising depiction of a possession: "Isabel's hair crisped at the roots with terror." Spines are delicately, deliciously chilled when she reveals just who is doing the possessing -- ghost stories don't have to be long or gruesome, to be thoroughly scary. Let's hope that Jeanette Winterson and Melvin Burgess, both also signed up for Hammer novellas, can pull off something as classy as Dunmore's opening salvo.'
