= Love of Fat Men =

Book by Helen Dunmore

- First edition
- Author: Helen Dunmore
- Language: English
- Publisher: Viking Press
- Publication date: 1997

Love of Fat Men is the first collection of short stories published by English author Helen Dunmore in 1997 by Viking Press.

== Stories ==
- "Love of Fat Men" (Stand 33/1, 1991) - Ulli's male friend Lucci often visits her, lying on her bed, sometimes plaiting her hair. She knows that she is not his type. One weekend they go to a party in the countryside.
- "Batteries" (...And a Happy New Year, ed. Campell, Hallett, Palmer and Woolsey, The Women's Press, 1993) - It's Christmas and Kay's father Eric has now produced batteries for her new Game Boy as they play together. Meanwhile, Maudie and her mother set off ice skating in the bay.
- "Short Days, Long Nights" (London Magazine, vol 29, 11 & 12, 1990) - In Finland a woman wakes up to find a man in her bed, as she unsuccessfully tries to remember what happened the previous evening, is he dead?
- "The Bridge Painter" - An artist has painted the Severn Bridge many times, and now the Second Severn Crossing. Today he is painting the Great Belt Bridge in Denmark. He looks back about his curious placing of a 'watchman' near bridges...
- "Spring Wedding" (New Writing 4, ed. A. S. Byatt and Alan Hollinghurst, Vintage, 1991) - Ulli has spent the day in bed at her boyfriend Dorma's house as his parents are away for the weekend.
- "Annina" (Caught in a Story, ed. Caroline Heaton and Christine Park, Vintage, 1992) - A mother talks about her tiny child Annina who was only an inch and a half when she was born. The mother kept Annina hidden from everyone except her son Blaise. Annina eventually leaves home to try and find others like her.
- "The Ice Bear" (A Bridport Harvest, 1990) - Ulli is on a ferry departing from Stockholm as she is returning home to Finland after a long holiday in Europe. On board she meets a man planning a mission in northern Finland. Some of her fathers colleagues on the deck then offer her a drink of schnapps.
- "The Orang-utans and the Angry Woman" (Iron Women, ed. Kitty Fitzgerald, Iron Press, 1990) - Sheena is at the zoo as she watches a large woman telling off her young daughter. Later the crowds gather at the Orang-utans cage as a little monkey is climbing up the bars.
- "Paivi" - Ulli helps her heavily pregnant friend Paivi in the ladies' toilet. Together they had gone out for a meal in Helsinki including Matti's boyfriend whose wife has left him. Paivi decides to go home as she is upset.
- "The Thief" - Sam is pregnant as she collects for items in the shops with lots of sales, ready for her baby to come. She is a good thief and has already got a good selection of babygros...
- "Ullikins" (Irish Tatler, Dec. 1994) - Ulli is Christmas shopping in a department store, thinking back to her childhood with her older brothers in a sledge. They have now married and have children of their own.
- "A Grand Day" (BBC Radio 4, July 1994) - After the First Communion a 44-year-old catholic priest thinks back over his ten years in the parish. Then Clare Cullen appears in the church as she tells him about 'her most embarrassing moment', as he tries to counsel her.
- "Family Meeting - eight-year-old Ulli arranges a meeting with her parents about what they do or don't like about their family. Ulli now an adult talks her mother who is feeling ill.
- "North Sea Crossing" - Carl and his father are having breakfast in a ferry surrounded by thick fog, as his father says that the engines have been set to reverse. The ferry has collided with a yacht as a Norwegian father and son are rescued.
- "A Question of Latitude" - Ulli is seated at an outside restaurant with her friends, eking out their money as she looks at the other customers. Ulli's friend Maria has had her bra stolen from the communal laundry room, as Ulli helps her. Ulli then looks forward to having a job as a tour guide.
- "Your Body Next to Mine" - Josephine is on holiday with her boyfriend in Austria, as she relaxes on the sunbathing deck. An older couple invite her to share their food with her, as she feels unable to refuse. Her boyfriend Edward arrives as he too is offered food.
- "Smell of Horses" (Writing Women, 8/2 & 3) - Ulli and her friends are in a large bathroom in a house owned by one of their aunts. The girls unashamedly enjoy the facilities..
- "Cliffs" - In Holland the cliffs are being eroded at the edge of a village. Tom Marl's house was washed away as he climbed up and down the cliff.
- "Girls on Ice" (Writing Women, 10/2) - Ulli and Edith skate on the frozen Baltic, further than they meant to. They turn round and attempt to make it back to the shore.

== Reception ==
Reviews are mixed:

- Julia Flynn from Sunday Telegraph explains "This book is swizz. Men of a certain weight will pounce on it, hoping for moral support...they will be disappointed. Male obesity gets a mention on page one, but it is page 107 before Helen Dunmore warms to her theme...And that's it. The rest of the book deals with women conspicuous for their thinness. Dunmore's publishers have simply, ahem, plumped for the most enticingly titled of the short stories contained in the book. That caveat apart, the book can be warmly recommended...these stories show the full scope of her talent." Flynn concludes that "Readers of every sex and weight will find things here to enjoy."
- Susanna Rustin writing in The Financial Times is unimpressed: "I was disappointed by this first collection of short stories. As a title, Love of Fat Men was a curious choice, since maternity and pregnancy are the recurring subjects. Dunmore writes well of the intensity and ambivalence of relationships between children and parents. Ice and snow provide much of the scenery, with several, linked stories set in Scandinavia; but despite these links, Love of Fat Men lacks a plot. The book's final image is that of a photograph, and perhaps it is as interesting snapshots that these stories are best regarded."
- Grace Ingoldby of The Daily Telegraph is also negative: "The style is self-important and serious - as if humour has not been invented yet - and there is a sense of a commission completed for its own sake, without backbone or any reference to itself."
- Desmond Christy from The Guardian is more positive: "Helen Dunmore is well known as a poet and a novelist. What does she bring to this, her first collection of short stories? There is more poetry than plot. Not much happens but what Dunmore shows us of life is honest, visceral, greasy, calorific - strong on appetites, desires and their accompanying frustrations. Even the endings and resolutions we hanker after are denied us, as if we would be gorging ourselves on cream cakes when we should stick to the high-fibre of reality. And Fat Men? Perhaps they aren't going to melt away."
- Tobias Hill is also positive in The Observer, "This is Helen Dunmore's first collection of short stories, and represents a new departure for an established poet and novelist...Dunmore's short stories are heavy on shortness, light on story, with much of the immediacy of the author's best poetry...the best part of these stories is their poetry. Dunmore uses her lyrical strength to describe the northern settings and their psychological effect on her characters."
- Claire Allfree and Christopher Hart in The Daily Telegraph write "Although ostensibly about nothing, these stories extract a hidden grace from simple details. Their themes might be the old ones of nostalgia for lost love and lost youth, but Dunmore's knack of suspending single moments of exhilaration and regret beyond the closing line results in a collection of stories that, like favourite poems are a pleasure to return to again and again.
