= Minuscule 831 =

- New Testament manuscript
- Text: Gospels †
- Date: 11th century
- Script: Greek
- Now at: Biblioteca della Badia
- Size: 19 cm by 13.5 cm
- Type: Byzantine text-type
- Category: V
- Note: —

Minuscule 831 (in the Gregory-Aland numbering), ε117 (von Soden), is an 11th-century Greek minuscule manuscript of the New Testament on parchment. The manuscript is lacunose.

== Description ==
The codex contains the text of the Gospel of Luke (19:25-25:53) and Gospel of John, on 69 parchment leaves (size 19 cm by 13.5 cm). The text is written in one column per page, 23 lines per page. The original codex contained text of the four Gospels.

The text is divided according to the κεφαλαια (chapters), and according to the smaller Ammonian Sections. The numbers of the κεφαλαια are given at the left margin, but there are not τιτλοι (titles) at the top of the pages. The numbers of the Ammonian Sections are given at the margin, but there are no references to the Eusebian Canons.

It contains the table of the κεφαλαια (table of contents) before Gospel of John, lectionary markings at the margin (for church reading), incipits, and subscriptions at the end of each Gospels.

== Text ==
The Greek text of the codex is a representative of the Byzantine text-type. Hermann von Soden classified it to the textual family K^{x}. Kurt Aland placed it in Category V.

According to the Claremont Profile Method it represents the textual family K^{x} in Luke 20. In Luke 1 and Luke 10 the manuscript is defective, and textual profile in these chapters is not possible.

The Pericope Adulterae (John 7:53-8:11) is placed at the end of the Gospel of John.

== History ==
C. R. Gregory dated the manuscript to the 11th century, Scrivener to the 12th century. Currently the manuscript is dated by the INTF to the 11th century.

The manuscript was examined and described by Antonio Rocci in 1882. It was added to the list of New Testament manuscripts by Scrivener (629) and Gregory (831^{e}). Gregory saw it in 1886.

Currently the manuscript is housed at the Biblioteca della Badia (A' α. 17), in Grottaferrata.

== See also ==
- List of New Testament minuscules
- Biblical manuscript
- Textual criticism
- Minuscule 830
- Minuscule 1356
