= Ingo (novel) =

2005 novel by Helen Dunmore

- Author: Helen Dunmore
- Cover artist: Getty Images
- Language: English
- Series: Ingo
- Subject: Fantasy life in the sea (Ingo)
- Genre: Children's Novel
- Publisher: HarperCollins
- Publication date: 5 September 2005
- Publication place: United Kingdom
- Media type: Print (hardcover)
- Pages: 328 pp
- ISBN: 0-00-720487-6
- OCLC: 63134578
- Followed by: The Tide Knot

Ingo is a children's novel by English writer Helen Dunmore, published in 2005 and the first of the Ingo pentalogy, followed by The Tide Knot (2006), The Deep (2007), The Crossing of Ingo (2008), and Chronicles of Ingo: Stormswept (2012).

== Plot summary ==
Sapphire is inside St. Senara's church, Cornwall, with her father Mathew Trewhella. He shows her the carved Zennor Mermaid chair and tells her the tale of the Mermaid of Zennor, in which a Mer falls in love with a human man who swims away with her, becoming Mer. He reveals the man's name is Mathew Trewhella, but claims his identical name is a coincidence. Later, on Midsummer Night, Mathew sings Peggy Gordon while gazing at the sea. The song references "Ingo", a realm "far across the briny sea".

For the next three nights, Mathew goes out sailing, returning with wet clothes. On the third night, he does not return. Many locals presume he has drowned or run off with another woman, but Sapphire and her brother Conor secretly promise to continue searching for him.

About a year later, Conor also disappears. Fearing that the same thing that happened to her father has happened to Conor, Sapphire sets out to look for him. She finds him speaking to a mysterious girl named Elvira in the water at the nearby cove, and waits until the girl suddenly disappears. When asked about the girl, Conor behaves as if she were never there, and is shocked to discover that hours have passed since he went for a "quick" swim.

The next day, Conor leaves again for the cove after their mother has left for work. Searching for him at the cove, Sapphire hears a beautiful voice singing a familiar song that her father had sung to her in the past. She calls out for her father and the singing stops. Suddenly she notices a boy perched on a rock. At first she thinks he is wearing a wetsuit pulled down to the waist, but later realises that he actually has a seal's tail instead of legs.

She nearly falls into the sea but the Mer boy, Faro, helps her keep her balance. When she calls him a "mermaid", he gets very scornful of humans, saying that him being a mermaid is "anatomically impossible" as he is, firstly, male and secondly, "all that scaly-tails and hair-combing mermaid and merman stuff comes from humans".

He takes her through the Skin (the surface) and into the world of Ingo which is extremely painful at the beginning for a human, and you have to forget about Air to be able to survive. She also finds out that it works the other way for the Mer: it hurts them when they go into the Air, and if they stay too long, they will die. After much time, Sapphire leaves Ingo only to realize that she has been there all day long instead of a few hours.

As time goes by, Sapphire is affected more and more by Ingo, craving salt and the call of the sea. Ingo calls to Sapphire more strongly than it does to Conor. Her brother, worried Sapphire will "disappear," takes her to the wise Granny Carne, who imparts her knowledge about Sapphire and Connor's Mer heritage. Granny Carne has earth power and can communicate with owls and bees, maybe even other animals.

Roger, a diver and a new boyfriend of Sapphire's mother, plans to go diving near the Bawns. Sapphire learns that this is where the Mer go to die and Ingo is deeply hostile to anyone who goes there, and that all of Ingo is prepared to defend what is held there. She also remembers that her father told her and Conor to never ever go near them and that it was dangerous.

Sapphire and Conor do their best to save Roger and his diving buddy, Gray, from the fierce seal guardians that protect that area. Conor is able to hear the seals' song that they sing to the dying Mer, so he sings their song which makes them calm down.

At first, Faro and Elvira (Faro's sister) do not help, but then realize how brave Sapphire and Conor are, so they help them. Sapphire and Conor, with Faro and Elvira's help, get Roger and Gray back into the boat and cover them with foil blankets. Then, that night as Roger is sleeping on the couch, he wakes up screaming from a nightmare, and tells Sapphire's mother that he was being thrown by underwater bulls. This makes Sapphire realize that the memory of the incident still resides in Roger's mind, just below the surface.

In the last scene, Sapphire works in her father's garden. Her neighbor's dog, Sadie, is lying beside her. Suddenly, the air goes still and she hears her father's voice saying, "Myrgh Kerenza", Mer for "Dear Daughter". Sapphire realises that she is now certain that her father is alive and calling to her.

== Reception ==
Ingo received starred reviews from Booklist and Publishers Weekly. Kirkus Reviews also reviewed the novel.
