= Ice Cream (Dunmore book) =

Book by Helen Dunmore

- First edition
- Author: Helen Dunmore
- Cover artist: Peer Lindgreen
- Language: English
- Publisher: Viking Press (2000, UK); Grove Press (2003, US)
- Publication place: United Kingdom
- Pages: 224
- ISBN: 978-0-670-88771-2

Ice Cream is the second collection of short stories written by English author Helen Dunmore and published in 2000 by Viking Press and in the United States by Grove Press in 2003.

== Stories ==
- "My Polish Teacher's Tie" - Half-Polish school caterer Carla Carter hears that the headmaster of her school is asking for penfriends for Polish teachers to improve their written English, for a future teacher exchange. Carla starts correspondence with Stefan, when he later arrives she thinks he believes her to be a teacher. Carla then reveals that she is just a caterer...
- "Lilac" - A mother has had a nervous breakdown so her husband sends her thirteen-year-old daughter Chris to stay in Sweden with her cousins, Agnes and Tommy. Chris then finds Tommy kissing his friend Henrik under the lilac bushes.
- "You Stayed Awake With Me" - The narrator, suffering from an unnamed disease returns to her family's seaside cottage with her childhood friend Janet. Then the narrator asks Janet about her sleeping with the narrators father when Janet was only fifteen.
- "The Fag" - The driver is travelling on the motorway through Devon where she is given a cigarette from her passenger.
- "Leonardo, Michelangelo, Superstork" - Two pregnant neighbours are suffering under the sweltering heat. Natural conception is now illegal, all women must be fitted with a 'Rubicon' to block natural sperms and unauthorized babies are killed. State-sanctioned cloning is only allowed but comes at a cost. The two neighbours have opposite situations.
- "The Lighthouse Keeper's Wife - A man's wife has been ill for some time, he returns home to find that she has just died.
- "Ice Cream" - On her birthday, Clara has the urge to eat ice-cream. Her personal trainer Elise warns her only have a double espresso. As a child Clara loved ice cream but with Elise's help she managed to curb her appetites and become a supermodel. But at the end Clara swallows vanilla ice cream.
- "Be Vigilant, Rejoice, Eat Plenty" - A parking meter appears to be offering advice to a woman as she heads to meet her divorced husband at a coffee shop.
- "The Clear and Rolling Water" - Jamie Robertson and Laura Foster lived on each side of the stream, their families owning the land on either side. They played together by the stream and travelled together to school. Laura's father renovated some cottages but found that he was unable to make them pay. The Robertsons offered to buy more of his Fosters land but bad blood arose between the fathers. Then Laura had an accident and Jamie ran to get help, but then Laura's father brandished a shotgun.
- "Living Out" Ulli lives alone in a Scandinavian city where it is bitterly cold. She walks by a river into the city unfazed by men who sometimes approach her. Where she attends a service in a Lutheran cathedral.
- "Mason's Mini-break" - Following a West Yorkshire award ceremony a pompous Booker-winning author goes for a walk the following morning and meets an artist at a river. He tells her that he is famous but she has not heard of him. He returns to his room where his wife shows him Charlotte Bronte souvenirs that she has bought from Haworth.
- "Salmon" - On holiday in Scotland, Paul skips stones on a sea loch but he wants to see wild salmon. Janet, the daughter's owner of Holiday cottage where Paul is staying, tells Paul where the salmon can be found.
- "The Icon Room" - Ulli chats with a man in a café, where he invites her to his two rooms in the house where he lives. One of the rooms is filled with icons which he has collected.
- "Coosing - Jordan and Rose share a bottle of wine and then kiss. John Hendra sees them together and abuses his wife. John then tells Blaise about Rose, in response Blaise attacks John. Rose then tells Blaise that he should not have attacked John.
- "The Kiwi-fruit Arbour" - On a car journey in France sixteen-year-old Ulli is pregnant, as she attempts to rationalise the language of her pregnancy and cope with her morning sickness.
- "Emily's Ring" - Emily's ring is now too small and it hangs round her neck on a silver chain. She gives her ring to Margaret to try on, as Emily struggles to control the children under her care on the beach as they plunge into the sea. But then she can no longer see Margaret.
- "Swimming into the Millennium" - Her sister has given her a three-month trial to a gym. Frances is not enamoured by the gym but has realised that the adjoining swimming pool is included. She buys a swimming costume and starts swimming. Two youths then help her and encourage her to Swim for the millennium.
- "Lisette" - The narrator is told about her grandfather who visited a Jewish family in Paris before WWII. The father Daniel was a doctor and his wife Julie was heavily pregnant. Their baby Lisette was born but she was unwell and the family were unable to leave Paris when the Germans invaded. Lucie died in Auschwitz, Lisette was never found.

== Reception ==
Views are mixed:

- Justine Jordan in The Guardian is unimpressed: "Sadly, in Ice Cream, her second short-story collection, many of the narrators really do dwindle into insubstantiality. Dunmore is mouth-wateringly good on food, and brilliant on nature, but her prose overwrites her structure...the blending of character and consistency of much of the descriptive tone make the stories blur into vagueness."
- Sarah Ferguson from The New York Times is a bit more positive: "Set primarily in her native England, Dunmore's carefully observed stories demonstrate her ear for language and her eye for the telling moment; at times, though, these brief works can seem not so much concise as disappointingly slight...Dunmore deftly uses narrative turning points to throw her characters into sharp relief...resonant language helps compensate for the unevenness of the stories, some of which aren't much more than vignettes. And they suggest that Dunmore may be more comfortable—as, say, in novels like The Siege and A Spell of Winter - when she allows her inventive imagery to flourish within a longer narrative.'
- Kirkus Reviews also praises the collection as it: 'sly digs at society's failings alternate with roundhouse swats while beauty and mystery hover nearby' and concludes with 'It doesn’t always happen, but whenever the commonplace and the sublime pair here, the result is absorbing.'
- Lucy Hughes-Hallett in the Sunday Times is also positive: 'Dunmore's prose, with only small variations to accommodate the differences of her various narrators, is direct and clear. She uses short sentences, transparent narrative structures, reliable narrators. The satisfactions she offers are the limited, straightforward ones of agreeable things finely described. There are disagreeable things in these stories as well - violent men, bereavement, chronic illness - but they are shadowy. Dunmore writes far better about a finely darned linen sheet than she does about the corpse it covers. Only in two stories about a Finnish woman, Ulli, is there a sense of there being more to get than what you see, but what it is remains unresolved - not so much withheld as left out. This is a volume not of hidden depths but of obvious pleasures.'
- Amanda Craig in The Times writes 'Ice Cream is the perfect Helen Dunmore title. With its blend of tantalising chilliness and smooth sensuality it encapsulates the essence of her appeal. Reading Dunmore is such an immediately delightful experience that her artful blending of the real and the surreal may not at once be evident. Here are stories of every flavour, some very unexpected.' and ends with 'Underlying these stories, as beneath Dunmore's novels, is a deep disquiet about the way our society works. It is the Ulli in her that makes her more than a celebrant of the senses, but it is easy to miss this because of the sheer pleasure of reading her prose. Her protagonists are survivors who skate on ice, knowing that at any moment it could crack and let them down into the dark. It is this touch that makes the head ring, long after the cream has slipped down the throat.
