= The Betrayal (Dunmore novel) =

2010 historical novel by Helen Dunmore

- First edition cover
- Author: Helen Dunmore
- Language: English
- Genre: Historical fiction
- Publisher: Fig Tree / Penguin Books
- Publication date: April 2010
- Publication place: United Kingdom
- Media type: Print (hardback & paperback)
- Pages: 330
- ISBN: 978-1905490592
- Preceded by: The Siege

The Betrayal is a 2010 historical novel by English writer Helen Dunmore. It is set in Leningrad in 1952, ten years after the Siege of Leningrad, and takes place during political repression in the Soviet Union and the plot against doctors in the Stalin era. The book was longlisted for the 2010 Man Booker Prize, and shortlisted for the 2011 Commonwealth Writer's Prize and the Orwell Prize.

The Betrayal is the second of a two-book series. The first, The Siege was published in 2001 and is set in Leningrad during the siege.

== Synopsis ==
Anna, Andrei and Kolya have survived the siege of Leningrad. Anna and Andrei marry and live in the city where she is a nursery-school teacher and he is a paediatrician at the local hospital. It is 1952 and they live in Joseph Stalin's repressive regime where it is prudent not to draw attention to yourself.

Andrei unwittingly takes on the case of a young boy, Gorya, who has a cancerous tumour in his leg. The child is the son of Volkov, a Commissar of State Security, and while Andrei knows the dangers if things go wrong, he is determined to give the boy the best possible care. Andrei tells Volkov the only course of action to prevent the cancer spreading is to amputate Gorya's leg. Volkov is unhappy with this decision, particularly because Brodskaya, the surgeon who will perform the operation, is Jewish. Andrei insists that she is an excellent surgeon and Volkov reluctantly agrees to the amputation. The operation is successful, and after intensive physiotherapy, Gorya is discharged.

Several months later Gorya returns. The cancer was not contained and has spread to his lungs. Volkov accuses Andrei of butchering Gorya for no reason and of being part of a conspiracy by doctors to murder Soviet leaders. Andrei is arrested and taken to Lubyanka prison in Moscow. Anna tries to elicit help from some of Andrei's colleagues, but they all shun her for fear of being implicated themselves. She sends Andrei money, but has no way of knowing whether it gets through to him. Andrei is subjected to brutal interrogation, which includes prolonged sleep deprivation. After several weeks he is interviewed by Volkov, who tells Andrei that Brodskaya was also arrested, but "suffered a heart attack". He promises to spare Andrei if he signs a document admitting "insufficient vigilance". Andrei signs the "confession" and is exiled to Siberia for 10 years.

When news arrives that Stalin has died, an uneasy calm descends over the country. The Doctor's plot is ruled to have been a fabrication, and all sentenced doctors are freed. Andrei slowly makes his way back home, while Anna wonders if she will see him again.

== Reception ==
In a review in BookBrowse, Sarah Sacha Dollacker called The Betrayal "[a] powerful novel" with "expertly drawn" characters, convincing dialogue and believable conflicts. Unlike some historical fiction that places the emphasis on setting rather than characters, Dollacker opined that Dunmore uses her characters to "paint" the setting for her. British poet Carol Rumens wrote in The Independent that Dunmore's dialogue is "powerful" and "subtle", and connects the book's two adversaries, Volkov and Andrei "in a way that shocks, surprises and moves us". She praised the author's depiction of children, adding that Gorya "is hauntingly portrayed".

Reviewing The Betrayal in The Guardian, Susanna Rustin described the novel as "an absorbing and thoughtful tale of good people in hard times". She praised the author's "meticulous" research into Soviet bureaucracy, hospitals and Leningrad at the time. Rustin remarked that while The Betrayal "falls far short" of other historical works, like Pat Barker's Regeneration trilogy, Dunmore's "intelligence and gift for narrative" makes her books something to look forward to. Jane Shilling wrote in The Telegraph that The Betrayal is a "lovely, thoughtful novel". She said the book's "impalpable apprehension", Andrei's conflict between his doctor's instinct to heal and his "panic-stricken desire" to protect his family, "is chillingly described". But Shilling felt that once apprehension turns to horror, Dunmore's "power to disturb weaken[s]". What happens to Andrei "has become so familiar that it is hard to find original ways to write about it".

== Works cited ==
- Dunmore, Helen (2010). The Betrayal (e-book ed.). Fig Tree / Penguin Books. ISBN 978-0-141-94603-0.
