= Zennor in Darkness =

1993 novel by Helen Dunmore

- First edition
- Author: Helen Dunmore
- Language: English
- Publisher: Viking Press
- Publication date: 1993
- Publication place: United Kingdom
- Media type: Print
- Awards: McKitterick Prize
- ISBN: 0-670-84695-3

Zennor in Darkness was the debut novel from English author Helen Dunmore, published in 1993. It won the 1994 McKitterick Prize which is awarded for debut novels for writers over 40. Until that point, Dunmore was primarily a poet though she had published short stories and books for children. As a result of winning the prize, Penguin offered her a two-book deal and fiction became her focus.

== Plot introduction ==
The book is set in and around Zennor in Cornwall in 1917 during the First World War and concerns Clare Coyne, a young artist, and her relationship with her beloved cousin John, who spends a few days home on leave from the trenches. Also prominent is the author D. H. Lawrence and his German wife Frieda who have fled from London to an isolated farmhouse nearby and befriend Clare. But all is not well as John is suffering from shell-shock, and Frieda is suspected by the authorities of signalling to passing U-boats.

== Inspiration ==
Asked about the appearance of D. H. Lawrence in the novel, Dunmore explained "Their story needed to be told. We know the bare bones of what happened – but what was it like for him and Frieda in this landscape? The details intrigued me: Lawrence creating a garden, growing things like salsify, getting in tons of manure. He knew how to do practical things – the ironing, the washing – and his combination of day-to-day good sense and the life of the mind fascinated me. I felt there were some interesting things about that particular period and about what turned him against England."

== Reception ==
Elaine Feinstein writing in The Independent concludes "Zennor In Darkness is the first novel, and far from flawless; Helen Dunmore moves too readily from one person's consciousness to another, and at first the present tense seems awkward, even pretentious. Nevertheless, we believe in Clare's foxy-faced intelligence, talent, and passion, and it is something of a triumph that the dense pleasures of landscape and texture never overpower our involvement in her story.

== Adaptation ==
BBC Radio 4 produced in 2021 a 10-episode radio drama based on the book, narrated by Louise Brealey.
