= Inside the Wave =

2017 poetry collection by Helen Dunmore

- Author: Helen Dunmore
- Subject: Death
- Genre: Poetry
- Published: 2017
- Publisher: Bloodaxe Books
- Media type: Paperback
- Pages: 70
- Awards: Costa Poetry Award, Costa Book of the Year Award 2017
- ISBN: 978-1-78037-358-4 (Paperback)
- Preceded by: The Malarkey

Inside the Wave is Helen Dunmore's last poetry collection, about impending death, published shortly before her death. In the 2017 Costa Book Awards it won the Poetry Award and the Book of the Year Award.

== Book ==
Helen Dunmore (1952–2017) published Inside the Wave, her final work, on 27 April 2017, just over a month before her death. The poems reflect on her coming death and her diagnosis with cancer. In the 2017 Costa Book Awards, the book won the Costa Poetry Award and overall Book of the Year Award, only the second time these have been given posthumously.

The collection contains 48 poems, including 5 "Versions from Catullus", a Roman poet, and three poems that relate to Homer's Odyssey, the eponymous "Inside the Wave", describing Odysseus back home from his travels, "Odysseus to Elpenor" and "My Daughter as Penelope".

The last poem in the collection, "Hold out your arms", is addressed to death, personified as a mother. It was written 10 days before her death, and was added to the collection for the second impression of the book, published in June 2017. It begins:

Death, hold out your arms for me
Embrace me
Give me your motherly caress
Through all this suffering
You have not forgotten me.

The poet Moniza Alvi stated that she had found it easy to decide to give the Costa poetry award to Dunmore's book, saying that the poems "can connect us with each other, at a deeper level", offering sharp and uncomfortable truths which were however "life-affirming and beautiful". The award's judges, noting that the book examined "the borderline between the living and the dead" called the collection "an astonishing set of poems – a final, great achievement."

The collection was featured on BBC Radio 4's A Good Read in November 2020.
