= A Spell of Winter =

1995 gothic novel by Helen Dunmore

- First edition
- Author: Helen Dunmore
- Language: English
- Genre: Gothic novel
- Publisher: Viking
- Publication date: March 1995
- Publication place: United Kingdom
- Media type: Print (hardback & paperback)
- Pages: 313
- ISBN: 0-670-86269-X

A Spell of Winter is a 1995 literary gothic novel by Helen Dunmore, set in England, around the time of World War I. The novel was the first recipient of the Orange Prize for Fiction in 1996.

== Plot summary ==
Cathy and her older brother Rob grow up without their parents on an estate in rural England in the early 20th century. Their mother had abandoned them for a better life in southern Europe, and their father was committed to a sanatorium. They live with their grandfather and are brought up by one of the servants, Kate. Their governess is Miss Gallagher, but the siblings hate her. Cathy and Rob have little contact with the outside world, and as they get older, they grow closer. An older, wealthy neighbour Mr Bullivant befriends Cathy, but she is more interested in her brother.

Cathy and Rob's contact becomes more intimate and eventually sexual. Miss Gallagher finds out about their liaison and threatens to expose them to their grandfather. Kate notices that Cathy is pregnant and assumes the father is Mr. Bullivant. Cathy wants the pregnancy terminated before anyone else notices, and Kate arranges an illegal abortion for her. Cathy is depressed about losing her baby, but tells no one, not even Rob. To prevent Miss Gallagher finding out, Cathy leads her deep into the nearby woods, ostensibly to show her some wild flowers. Cathy, knowing she will not find her way back home on her own, frightens her with ghost stories, then abandons her. The next day Miss Gallagher is found dead of a suspected heart attack. Cathy is overcome with guilt and withdraws. She and her brother drift apart.

Rob and Kate become close and they leave for a new life in Canada. The Great War starts and all the local boys of age depart to fight in France. Mr. Bullivant serves on a hospital ship. Rob returns from Canada, without Kate, but leaves soon after for France. Cathy later receives news that her brother is missing, presumed dead. After the War, Mr. Bullivant returns and persuades Cathy to travel with him to France to see her mother. Cathy has no interest in her, but agrees to go. In Brittany she finds and reunites with her mother.

== Reception ==
In a review in The Washington Post, American writer and academic Nicholas Delbanco described A Spell of Winter as "an erotic pastoral". He said it is "heady Gothic stuff" reminiscent of Brontë's Wuthering Heights. A less experienced author may have turned this into a "romantic melodrama", but Delbanco stated that Dunmore's "authoritative telling" has produced a "haunt[ing]" tale.

A reviewer at Publishers Weekly called the novel "a finely crafted, if disturbing, literary page-turner". Some readers may find the book's "intensity and darkness", which hovers between "gripping and overwrought", a little "heavy-handed", but the reviewer was impressed by Dunmore's "keen, close writing" and "artful use of metaphor". They felt that the book was worthy of the Orange Prize.

Writing in The New York Times, Louisa Kamps was a little more critical of the novel. She did not find Cathy "very credible, or likable", and felt that she lacks empathy. Attempts by Dunmore to make Cathy a "modern update" of Brontë's Catherine Earnshaw turns A Spell of Winter into "a string of salacious, increasingly overwritten adventures straight out of the pulp-fiction files". The siblings' "incestuous intimacy" in particular stands out as an example of one of these sagas. Kamps noted that once the War starts, Cathy shows signs of "something akin to sympathy for others", but added that it is too late "to believe, or care, that the clouds in Cathy's life are suddenly parting."

== Works cited ==
- Dunmore, Helen (2007) [1995]. A Spell of Winter (e-book ed.). Penguin Books. ISBN 978-0-14193-341-2.
