= Talking to the Dead (novel) =

1996 novel by Helen Dunmore

- First edition
- Author: Helen Dunmore
- Cover artist: Three Friends by Peter Kuhfeld
- Language: English
- Genre: novel
- Publisher: Viking Books (UK); Little, Brown (US)
- Publication date: 1996
- Publication place: United Kingdom
- Media type: Print
- Pages: 213
- ISBN: 0-67-087002-1

Talking of the Dead was the fourth novel published in 1996 by British author Helen Dunmore, a "chilling tie of sibling rivalry and sudden infant death", and has been described as one of the best novels in the 1990s. It was her first novel to be published in the United States.

== Plot ==
Nina, an uninhibited London-based photographer, is visiting her sister Isabel in Sussex. It is the hottest summer on record as Isabel struggles with her new-born baby Antony following a hysterectomy. Supporting Isabel is Susan, a neighbouring nanny and Isabel's gay friend Edward. Nina also has a fling with Isabel's husband Richard.

In St Ives, Cornwall twenty-five years ago tragedy struck the sisters when their brother Colin died of sudden infant death syndrome, from which their mother never recovered. Isabel gradually descends into madness as Nina worries that that history may repeat itself...

== Reception ==
- Carol Kino writing in the New York Times praises Dunmore "In the hands of another writer, these elements - murder, adultery, repressed memory, familial love - might well have become a fevered, one-note drama, rendered steamier by taking place during Britain's hottest summer in 200 years. What makes Ms. Dunmore's story so gripping and complex is her ability to convey many different layers of experience at once. Throughout, her language is dense with imagery and metaphor, as compacted as poetry. Yet it reads simply, and every scene, past and present, is grounded in straightforward, completely natural action...In this way the story metamorphoses from a simple mystery into a moral whodunit. Does guilt lie in desire or in action? Can a single act change from wicked to kind, depending on who witnesses it? Poor Nina moves with a sense of destiny toward the novel's pleasurably inconclusive conclusion. And we experience an extra shudder of delight as we realize the lifelike nature of what we have read: a tale told by an uncertain narrator, whose only absolute is death.
- In Kirkus Reviews, Talking to the Dead "combines the suspense of a Hitchcock thriller with a captivating family drama...Nina struggles to remember what really happened during their childhood as time runs out for Antony and as the webs of family intrigue tighten around her" a novel that is "sophisticated, sensual and frightening and remarkably visual."
- According to Booklist, "Dunmore is a deeply sensuous writer: heat and shimmer, food and water, texture and scent are beautifully realised."
