= Minuscule 498 =

- New Testament manuscript
- Text: New Testament †
- Date: 14th-century
- Script: Greek
- Found: 1848
- Now at: British Library
- Size: 26.7 cm by 19 cm
- Type: Byzantine text-type
- Category: V
- Hand: very minute writing

Minuscule 498 is a Greek minuscule manuscript of the New Testament, on parchment. It is labelled by the siglum 498 in the Gregory-Aland numbering of New Testament manuscripts, and δ 402 in the von Soden numbering of New Testament manuscripts. Using the study of comparative writings styles (palaeography), it has been assigned to the 14th-century. Biblical scholar Frederick H. A. Scrivener labelled it by the number 584. The manuscript has several gaps.

== Description ==
The manuscript is a codex (precursor to the modern book format), containing the text of the whole New Testament on 186 parchment leaves (size 26.7 cm by 19 cm) with some missing portions:

- Matthew 1:1-2:12
- Mark 5:2-6:10
- Acts 1:1-5:2
- James 1:1-5:4
- Jude 1:1-25
- Romans 1:1-4:9
- 2 Thess 2:14-3:18
- 1 Timothy 1:1-13; 6:19-21
- 2 Timothy 1:1-2:19

The text is written in one column per page, 35 lines per page, in a very small hand. The text of the Gospels is divided according to he Ammonian Sections, whose numbers are given in the margin, with references to the Eusebian Canons (both early divisions of the New Testament into sections). It contains a prolegomena written in a later hand, the Eusebian Canon tables, and the Euthalian Apparatus. In Acts it contains titles (known as τιτλοι / titloi) and lectionary markings in the margin. There is a prolegomena to every epistle.

The order of books is as follows:

- Gospels
- Acts
- Catholic epistles
- Pauline epistles
- Apocalypse

The order of Gospels follows a particular order: Matthew, Luke, Mark, John. This order is also seen in Minuscule 392.

== Text ==
The Greek text of the codex is considered to be a representative of the Byzantine text-type. Biblical scholar Kurt Aland placed it in Category V of his New Testament manuscript classification system. Category V manuscripts are described as having "a purely or predominantly Byzantine text." According to the Claremont Profile Method (a specific analysis of textual data), it represents the textual group M 1386 in Luke 1, Luke 10, and as a weak member of this group in Luke 20.

== History ==
The manuscript was written by a copyist named Gerasimus. It was bought in 1848 by Thomas Rodd. The manuscript was added to the list of New Testament manuscripts by Scrivener. It was examined by Bloomfield. Scrivener thoroughly examined and collated its text. Biblical scholar Herman C. Hoskier collated text of the Apocalypse.

It is dated by the INTF to the 14th-century. It is currently housed at the British Library (shelf number Add MS 17469) in London.

== See also ==
- List of New Testament minuscules
- Biblical manuscript
- Textual criticism
