= Minuscule 1078 =

- New Testament manuscript
- Text: Gospels
- Date: 10th century
- Script: Greek
- Now at: Great Lavra
- Size: 19 cm by 14 cm
- Type: Byzantine text-type
- Category: V
- Note: commentary

Minuscule 1078 (in the Gregory-Aland numbering), A^{159} (von Soden), is a 10th-century Greek minuscule manuscript of the New Testament on parchment. It was adapted for liturgical use. The manuscript is not lacunose.

== Description ==
The codex contains the text of the four Gospels, on 282 parchment leaves (size 19 cm by 14 cm). The text is written in one column per page, 23-25 lines per page. It contains a commentary and lectionary markings at the margin (for liturgical use).

== Text ==
The Greek text of the codex is a representative of the Byzantine text-type. Hermann von Soden classified it to the textual family A^{b}. Kurt Aland placed it in Category V.

According to the Claremont Profile Method it represents the textual family K^{x} in Luke 1, Luke 10, and Luke 20.

It lacks text of Matthew 16:2b–3. The Pericope Adulterae (John 7:53-8:11) is placed at the end of the Gospel of John. The pericope has an additional scholion at the margin: ευρηται και ετερα εν αν αρχαιος αντιγραφοις απερ συνειδομεν γραψαι προς τω τελει του αυτου ευαγγελιστου α εστιν ταδε. The same scholion has codex 1076 (with two differences - το for τω and ευαγγελιου for ευαγγελιστου).

== History ==
Caspar René Gregory dated the manuscript to the 10th century. Currently the manuscript is dated by the INTF to the 10th century.

The manuscript was added to the list of New Testament manuscripts by C. R. Gregory (1078^{e}). Gregory saw it in 1886.

Currently the manuscript is housed at the Great Lavra (A' 16), in Athos.

== See also ==
- List of New Testament minuscules (1001–2000)
- Biblical manuscript
- Textual criticism
