= Minuscule 1076 =

- New Testament manuscript
- Text: Gospels
- Date: 10th century
- Script: Greek
- Now at: Great Lavra
- Size: 16.2 cm by 12.5 cm
- Type: Byzantine text-type
- Category: V
- Note: —

Minuscule 1076 (in the Gregory-Aland numbering), ε1140 (von Soden), is a 10th-century Greek minuscule manuscript of the New Testament on parchment. The manuscript does not contain gaps.

== Description ==
The codex contains a complete text of the four Gospels, on 282 parchment leaves (size 16.2 cm by 12.5 cm). The text is written in one column per page, 22 lines per page. The texts of Matthew 18:9-19:11; Mark 13:3-17; John 12:21-35 were supplied by later hand on paper.

The manuscript is ornamented and contains pictures.

== Text ==
The Greek text of the codex is a representative of the Byzantine text-type. Hermann von Soden classified it to the textual family K^{x}. Kurt Aland placed it in Category V.

According to the Claremont Profile Method it represents the textual family K^{x} in Luke 10 and Luke 20. In Luke 1 it has mixture of the Byzantine families. It creates textual pair with minuscule 1417.

It lacks text of Matthew 16:2b–3 (signs of the times). It contains the Pericope Adulterae (John 7:53-8:11) is placed at the end of the Gospel of John. The pericope has additional scholion, questioned authenticity of the pericope, at the margin: ευρηται και ετερα εν αν αρχαιος αντιγραφοις απερ συνειδομεν γραψαι προς το τελει του αυτου ευαγγελιου α εστιν ταδε. The same scholion has codex 1078.

== History ==
Gregory dated the manuscript to the 10th century. Currently the manuscript is dated by the INTF to the 10th century.

The manuscript was added to the list of New Testament manuscripts by Gregory (1076^{e}). Gregory saw it in 1886.

Currently the manuscript is housed at the Great Lavra (A' 12), in Athos.

== See also ==
- List of New Testament minuscules (1001–2000)
- Minuscule 1356
- Biblical manuscript
- Textual criticism
