= Elpenor =

Greek mythological figure in the Odyssey

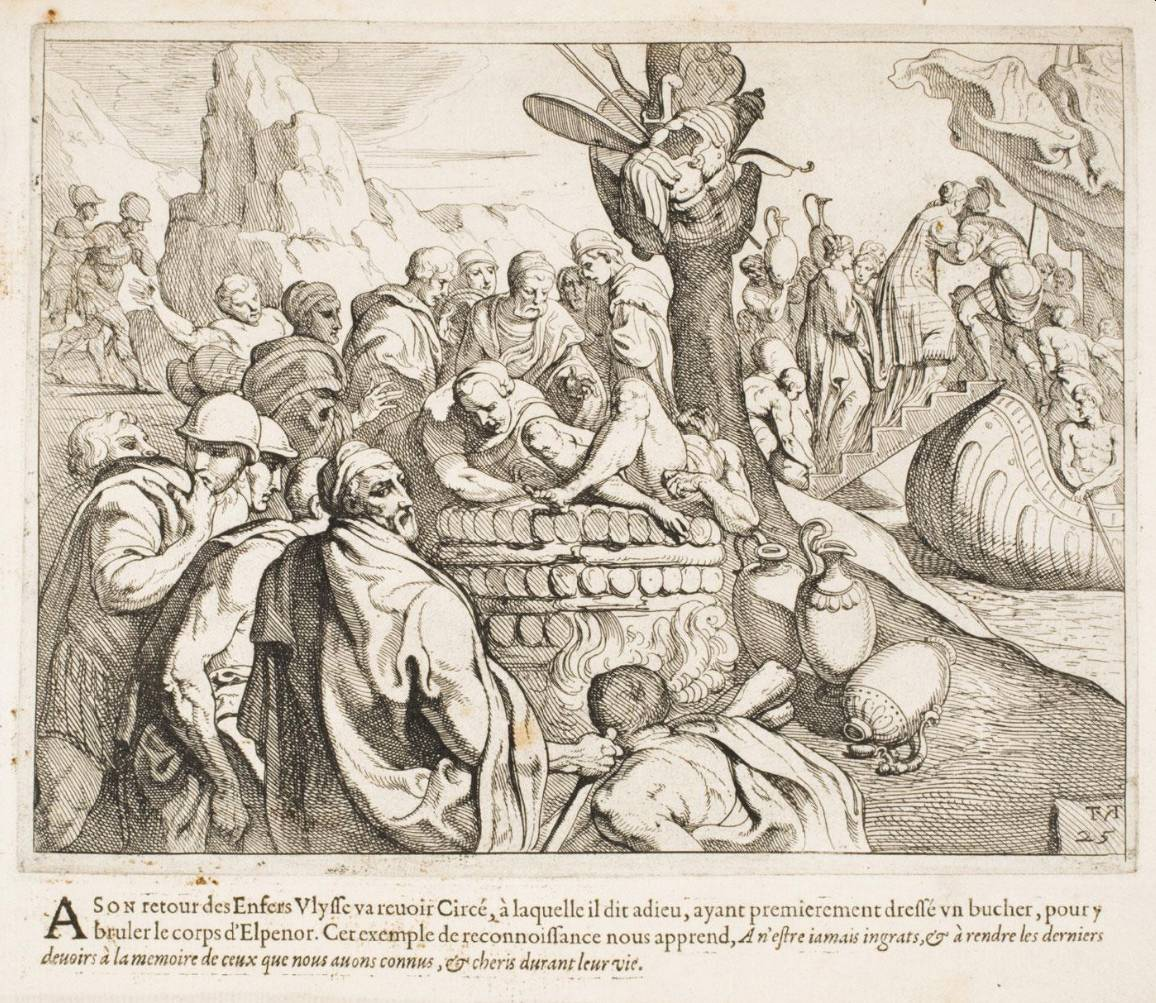
Odysseus cremating the body of Elpenor (Theodoor van Thulden, c. 1630)

Elpenor (/ɛlˈpiːnər/; Ancient Greek: Ἐλπήνωρ) was the youngest comrade of Odysseus in Greek mythology. While on the island of Circe, he became drunk and decided to spend the night on the roof. In the morning he fell and broke his neck, dying quickly.

== Mythology ==
Elpenor was not especially notable for his intelligence or strength, but he survived the Trojan War, and appears in the Odyssey. He is the youngest man to survive the Laestrygonians. While Odysseus was staying on Aeaea, Circe's island, Elpenor became drunk and climbed onto the roof of Circe's palace to sleep. The next morning, waking upon hearing his comrades making preparations to travel to Hades, he forgot he was on the roof and fell, breaking his neck and dying. Odysseus and his men apparently noticed his absence, but they were too busy to look for him. When Odysseus arrived in Hades, Elpenor was the first shade to meet him, and pleaded with him to return to Aeaea and give his body a proper cremation and burial. After finishing his task in the underworld, Odysseus returned to Aeaea and cremated Elpenor's body, then buried his ashes with his armour and marked the grave with an oar of his ship.

Classicist Michael C. J. Putnam, discussing the Aeneid, suggests that perhaps Elpenor in earlier versions of the Odyssey may have been the pilot for Odysseus.

Separate from the Odyssey, the Latin account of Dictys Cretensis mentions a member of Odysseus' crew named Alphenor, who tries to carry off the daughter of Polyphemus, Arene, but fails and incurs his wrath.

== Later historic uses ==
The story of Elpenor was the model for the story of Palinurus in Virgil's Aeneid. In the Aeneid, Palinurus, one of Aeneas' men, falls overboard and ends up swimming to an island nearby. He is killed on the island by the natives that live there. Later on in the story, Aeneas travels to the underworld where he sees Palinurus. There, Palinurus pleads with Aeneas to give him a proper burial.

Biblical scholar Dennis MacDonald compares the story of Elpenor to Plato's Myth of Er, and also suggests that Luke may have adapted Elpenor's tale for the story of Eutychus in the New Testament.

== Modern uses ==
The character of Patrick "Paddy" Dignam, whose funeral is the focus of Episode 6 ("Hades") of Ulysses by James Joyce, is a modern counterpart to Elpenor. This chapter of Ulysses is a main inspiration for the film Bye Bye Braverman.

Elpenor is the subject of the short novel Elpénor by Jean Giraudoux, published in 1919, which retells some of the stories of the Odyssey in humorous fashion.

Derek Mahon suggests Elpenor (but does not name him specifically) in his poem "Lives". Mahon talks of a decaying oar, planted in a beach, thinking of Ithaca. Ezra Pound references Elpenor in his poem Hugh Selwyn Mauberley by having the eponymous poet's grave marked by an oar, with an epitaph that recalls Elpenor's. Pound also makes use of Elpenor in the first of his Cantos: "But first Elpenor came, our friend Elpenor / Unburied, cast on the wide earth, / Limbs that we left in the house of Circe, / Unwept, unwrapped in sepulchre, since toils urged other."

Archibald MacLeish wrote a poem about Elpenor, first published in 1933 (actually a revision/reordering of earlier material) and republished in many collections afterwards. Giorgos Seferis, author of "Sensual Elpenor", seems to have felt an affinity with the character, a dislocated man like himself. Takis Sinopoulos also wrote a poem called "Elpenor". Helen Dunmore included a poem "Odysseus to Elpenor" in her collection Inside the Wave (2017).
