= Minuscule 392 =

- New Testament manuscript
- Text: Gospels
- Date: 12th century
- Script: Greek
- Now at: Vatican Library
- Size: 29.1 cm by 23.2 cm
- Type: Byzantine text-type
- Category: V
- Note: marginalia

Minuscule 392 (in the Gregory-Aland numbering), Θ^{ε23} (Soden), is a Greek minuscule manuscript of the New Testament, on parchment. Paleographically it has been assigned to the 12th century. It has marginalia.

== Description ==
The codex contains the text of the four Gospels on 385 parchment leaves (29.1 cm by 23.2 cm). It is written in one column per page, in 36 lines per page. It contains the commentary of Theophylact.

It is a minuscule portion of the same codex to which belongs uncial codex 054 (first six pages).

The text is divided according to the κεφαλαια (chapters), whose numbers are given at the margin, and their τιτλοι (titles) at the top of the pages.

The order of the Gospels is an unusual: Matthew, Luke, Mark, John (as in codex 498).

== Text ==
The Greek text of the codex is a representative of the Byzantine text-type. Aland placed it in Category V.

According to the Claremont Profile Method it represents mixed Byzantine text in Luke 1 and textual family K^{x} in Luke 10 and Luke 20.

== History ==
The manuscript was added to the list of New Testament manuscripts by Scholz (1794–1852). C. R. Gregory saw it in 1886.

The manuscript is currently housed at the Vatican Library (Barberini gr. 521, fol. 7-391) in Rome.

== See also ==
- List of New Testament minuscules
- Biblical manuscript
- Textual criticism
