= The Crossing of Ingo =

2008 novel by Helen Dunmore

- Author: Helen Dunmore
- Language: English
- Series: Ingo series
- Genre: Children's fantasy
- Publisher: HarperCollins Children's Books
- Publication date: 5 May 2008
- Publication place: United Kingdom
- Media type: Print (hardback)
- Pages: 320
- ISBN: 978-0-00-727025-5
- OCLC: 191890445
- Preceded by: The Deep
- Followed by: Stormswept

The Crossing of Ingo is a children's fantasy novel by Helen Dunmore, first published in 2008. It is the fourth and final volume in the Ingo tetralogy.

It was longlisted for the 2008 Booktrust Teenage Prize.

== Plot summary ==
Sapphire and Conor have been called to make the dangerous Crossing of Ingo, a journey to the bottom of the world, and it has been prophesied that if they complete it then Ingo and Air will start to heal. They have their Mer friends, Faro and Elvira, to help them, but their old enemy, Ervys, is determined to make sure they don't succeed. They have many adventures going around the world and Sapphire finds new abilities.

== Reception ==
The book has received positive reception from the Liverpool Echo and The Times, the latter of which described it as "a dramatic climax" to the series and picked it for a summer reading selection for 2008.
