= Helen Dunmore =

British writer (1952–2017)

Helen Dunmore FRSL
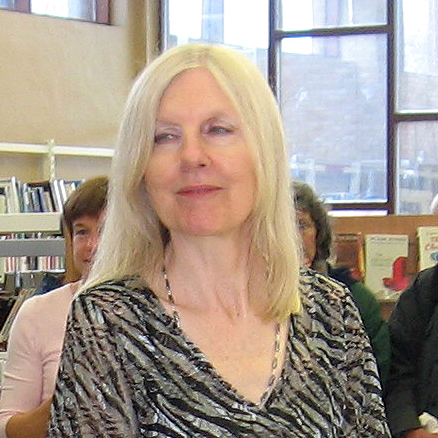
- Dunmore in 2008
- Born: 12 December 1952; Beverley, Yorkshire, England
- Died: 5 June 2017 (aged 64); Bristol, England
- Education: University of York
- Occupations: Poet, novelist, children's writer
- Spouse: Francis Charnley (m. 1980)
- Children: Patrick; Tess; Ollie (stepson)
- Writing career
- Notable awards: McKitterick Prize 1994 Zennor in Darkness; Orange Prize 1996 A Spell of Winter; National Poetry Competition 2009 "The Malarky"; Costa Book Awards 2017 Inside the Wave
- Website: www.helendunmore.com

Helen Dunmore FRSL (12 December 1952 – 5 June 2017) was a British poet, novelist, and short story and children's writer.

Her best known works include the novels Zennor in Darkness, A Spell of Winter and The Siege, and her last book of poetry Inside the Wave. She won the inaugural Orange Prize for Fiction, the National Poetry Competition, and posthumously the Costa Book Award.

== Biography ==
Dunmore was born in Beverley, Yorkshire, in 1952, the second of four children of Betty (née Smith) and Maurice Dunmore. She attended Sutton High School, London and Nottingham Girls' High School, then direct grant grammar schools.

She studied English at the University of York, and lived in Finland for two years (1973–75) and worked as a teacher. She lived after that in Bristol. Dunmore was a Fellow of the Royal Society of Literature (FRSL). Some of Dunmore's children's books are included in reading schemes for use in schools.

In March 2017, she published her last novel, Birdcage Walk, as well as an article about mortality for The Guardian written after she was diagnosed with terminal cancer. She died on 5 June 2017. Her final poetry collection Inside the Wave, published in April 2017 shortly before her death, posthumously won the Poetry and overall Book of the Year awards in the 2017 Costa Book Awards.

== Personal life ==
Dunmore's husband Frank Charnley, whom she married in 1980, is a lawyer. Dunmore had a son, daughter and stepson, and three grandchildren at the time of her death.

== Awards and honours ==
- 1987: Poetry Book Society Choice, The Raw Garden
- 1994: McKitterick Prize, Zennor in Darkness
- 1996: Orange Prize (inaugural winner), A Spell of Winter
- 1990: Cardiff International Poetry Prize
- 1997: T. S. Eliot Prize, shortlist, Bestiary
- 2010: Man Booker Prize, longlist, The Betrayal
- 2010: National Poetry Competition winner, "The Malarkey"
- 2015: Walter Scott Prize, shortlist, The Lie
- 2017 (posthumously): Costa Book Awards Poetry and Book of the Year Awards, Inside the Wave

== Bibliography ==
=== Novels ===
- Zennor in Darkness (1993, McKitterick Prize 1994)
- Burning Bright (1994)
- A Spell of Winter (1995, Orange Prize 1996)
- Talking to the Dead (1996)
- Your Blue-Eyed Boy (1998)
- With your Crooked Heart (1999)
- The Siege (2001, shortlisted for the Whitbread Novel of the Year Award and the Orange Prize 2002)
- Mourning Ruby (2003)
- House of Orphans (2006)
- Counting the Stars (2008)
- The Betrayal (2010, longlisted for the Man Booker prize)
- The Greatcoat (2012) (ISBN 978-0-09-956493-5)
- The Lie (2014)
- Exposure (2016) (ISBN 978-0-09-195394-2)

An "Exclusive edition for independent bookshops" (ISBN 978-1-78633-000-0) includes a 14-page essay "On Reading"

- Birdcage Walk (2017, longlisted for the Walter Scott Prize 2018)

=== Short story collections ===
- Love of Fat Men (1997)
- Ice Cream (2000)
- Rose, 1944 (2005)
- Girl, Balancing and Other Stories (2018)

=== Young adult books ===
- Zillah and Me!
  - The Lilac Tree (first published as Zillah and Me) (2004)
  - The Seal Cove (first published as The Zillah Rebellion) (2004)
  - The Silver Bead (2004)
- The Ingo Chronicles
  - Ingo (2005)
  - The Tide Knot (2006)
  - The Deep (2007)
  - The Crossing of Ingo (2008)
  - Stormswept (2012)

=== Children's books ===
- Going to Egypt (1992)
- In the Money (1995)
- Go Fox (1996)
- Fatal Error (1996)
- Amina's Blanket (1996)
- Allie's Apples (1997)
- Bestiary (1997)
- Clyde's Leopard (1998)
- Great-Grandma's Dancing Dress (1998)
- Brother Brother, Sister Sister (1999)
- Allie's Rabbit (1999)
- Allie's Away (2000)
- Aliens Don't Eat Bacon Sandwiches (2000)
- The Ugly Duckling (2001)
- Tara's Tree House (2003)
- The Ferry Birds (2010)
- The Islanders (2011)
- The Lonely Sea Dragon (2013)

=== Poetry collections ===
- The Apple Fall (Bloodaxe Books, 1983)
- The Sea Skater (Bloodaxe Books, 1986)
- The Raw Garden (Bloodaxe Books, 1988)
- Short Days, Long Nights: New & Selected Poems (Bloodaxe Books, 1991)
- Recovering a Body (Bloodaxe Books, 1994)
- Secrets (The Bodley Head, 1994) [children's poetry title]
- Bestiary (Bloodaxe Books, 1997)
- Out of the Blue: Poems 1975–2001 (Bloodaxe Books, 2001)
- Snollygoster and Other Poems (Scholastic Press, 2001) [children's poetry title]
- Glad of these times (Bloodaxe Books, 2007)
- The Malarkey (Bloodaxe Books, 2012)
- Inside the Wave (Bloodaxe Books, 2017)
