= List of World Heritage Sites in Greece =

Location of UNESCO World Heritage Sites within Greece. Blue dots show the Minoan Palatial Centres.

The United Nations Educational, Scientific and Cultural Organization (UNESCO) designates World Heritage Sites of outstanding universal value to cultural or natural heritage which have been nominated by countries which are signatories to the UNESCO World Heritage Convention, established in 1972. Cultural heritage consists of monuments (such as architectural works, monumental sculptures, or inscriptions), groups of buildings, and sites (including archaeological sites). Natural features (consisting of physical and biological formations), geological and physiographical formations (including habitats of threatened species of animals and plants), and natural sites which are important from the point of view of science, conservation or natural beauty, are defined as natural heritage. Greece ratified the convention on 17 July 1981, making its natural and cultural sites eligible for inclusion on the list.

Greece has 21 properties in Greece inscribed on the World Heritage List, 18 of which are cultural sites and three (Meteora, Mount Athos, and Mount Olympus) are mixed, listed for both their natural and cultural significance. The first site added to the list was the Temple of Apollo Epicurius at Bassae, in 1986. The next two sites listed were the Archeological site of Delphi and the Acropolis of Athens, in the following year. Five sites were added in 1988, two in 1989 and 1990 each, one in 1992, one in 1996, two in 1999, and one in 2007. The most recent site added was the wider area of Mount Olympus, in 2026. In addition, there are 11 sites on the tentative list, all of which were nominated in 2014.

== World Heritage Sites ==
UNESCO lists sites under ten criteria; each entry must meet at least one of the criteria. Criteria i through vi are cultural, and vii through x are natural.

World Heritage Sites
Site	Image	Location (region)	Year listed	UNESCO data	Description
Temple of Apollo Epicurius at Bassae	Temple columns and some scaffolds	Peloponnese	1986	392; i, ii, iii (cultural)	The temple, dedicated to Apollo Epicurius, was built in the 5th century BCE in the mountains of Arcadia. It is considered by UNESCO to be one of the best preserved monuments of classical antiquity. It is the earliest monument that features all three classical orders, Doric, Ionic, and Corinthian. After falling out of use, the temple was forgotten for nearly 1700 years. It was rediscovered in the 18th century, attracting the attention of scholars and artists.
Archeological site of Delphi	Free standing columns	Central Greece	1987	393; i, ii, iii, iv, vi (cultural)	Delphi, located at the foot of Mount Parnassus, was the site of the Temple of Apollo, a Panhellenic sanctuary, and in Greek view the "navel of the world" (the Omphalos). Pythia, the oracle, resided in the temple, receiving pilgrims from all Greece. In the 6th century BCE, Delphi was seen as the religious centre and symbol of unity of the ancient Greek world.
Acropolis, Athens	Look at the Acropolis hill from a distance, Parthenon visible	Attica	1987	404; i, ii, iii, iv, vi (cultural)	The Acropolis of Athens stands on a steep hill above the city. Originally a fortification, it gradually developed into a religious sanctuary, associated with the cult of the goddess Athena. In the 5th century BCE, following their victory over the Persians, the Athenians under Pericles constructed a large number of monuments including the Parthenon, the Erechtheion, the Propylaia, and the Temple of Athena Nike. The monuments in the Acropolis have prominently inspired the Neoclassical architecture.
Mount Athos	Monastery overlooking the sea	Mount Athos	1988	454; i, ii, iv, v, vi, vii (mixed)	Situated on a narrow peninsula, Mount Athos has been governed as an autonomous entity since Byzantine times. An Orthodox spiritual centre since the 10th century, it is home to about 20 active monasteries. Mount Athos has exerted lasting influence on the development of religious architecture and monumental painting.
Meteora	Rock formations and a monastery building	Thessaly	1988	455; i, ii, iv, v, vii (mixed)	Meteora is a rock formation of sandstone peaks, hosting 24 Orthodox monasteries. Many of them were built on the almost inaccessible peaks during the revival of the eremeric ideal in the 15th century. The monasteries are decorated by 16th century frescoes, which represent a key stage in the development of post-Byzantine painting.
Paleochristian and Byzantine monuments of Thessaloniki	Church of Hagios Demetrios from distance	Central Macedonia	1988	456; i, ii, iv (cultural)	Thessalonika was one of the first bases for the spread of Christianity. This site comprises several churches (including the Church of Hosios David and Hagios Demetrios (pictured)), constructed from the 4th to the 15th century, city walls from the early Byzantine period, and the Rotunda, commissioned in the 4th century by the Roman Emperor Galerius and later converted into a church.
Sanctuary of Asklepios at Epidaurus	Free standing columns	Peloponnese	1988	491; i, ii, iii, iv, vi (cultural)	The cult of Asklepios, the god of medicine, developed in the city-state of Epidaurus at the latest in the 6th century BCE. The principal monuments at the site include the Temple of Asclepius, the Tholos, and the Theatre, which is considered to be the finest ancient Greek theatre. The sanctuary is important in the history of medicine, marking the transition from the belief in divine healing to the science of medicine.
Medieval City of Rhodes	Inside the main courtyard of the Palace of the Grand-Master of the Knights of Rhodes	South Aegean	1988	493; ii, iv, v (cultural)	The island of Rhodes was occupied by the Order of St John of Jerusalem (Knights Hospitaller) from 1309 to 1523, who transformed the city of Rhodes into a stronghold and surrounded it with a 4 kilometres (2.5 mi) wall. The fortifications were built upon the existing Byzantine ones. The Upper town features several buildings from the Gothic period, including the Palace of the Grand Masters, the Great Hospital, and the Street of the Knights. When the Ottomans took the island, they converted most churches to mosques. Reconstruction took place during the Italian occupation in the early 20th century.
Archeological site of Mystras	Ruins, photo from above	Peloponnese	1989	511; ii, iii, iv (cultural)	The town of Mystras developed around the fortress erected in 1249 under the Prince of Achaia, William of Villehardouin, on the slopes of Mount Taygetus. In 1262, it was surrendered to the Byzantines and saw a great prosperity during the Palaeologan Renaissance era. It was later taken first by the Ottomans and then by the Venetians. After 1834, the inhabitants started leaving Mystras for the modern town of Sparta, and Mytras became a ruin.
Archeological site of Olympia	Free standing columns	West Greece	1989	517; i, ii, iii, iv, vi (cultural)	In the 10th century BCE, Olympia became a centre for the worship of Zeus. It was a Panhellenic sanctuary and the location of the ancient Olympic Games, beginning in 776 BCE. In addition to numerous temples and sanctuaries, it contains the remains of several sporting structures, such as its stadium.
Delos	Free standing columns	South Aegean	1990	530; ii, iii, iv, vi (cultural)	The birthplace of Apollo and Artemis according to Greek mythology, the sacred island of Delos was one of the most important Panhellenic sanctuaries during the Archaic and Classical periods. The sanctuary of Apollo on Delos attracted pilgrims from all over Greece, making Delos a prosperous trading port. It fell into decline after 69 BCE.
Monasteries of Daphni, Hosios Loukas and Nea Moni of Chios	Inner courtyard of Hosious Loukas	Central Greece, Attica, North Aegean	1990	537; i, iv (cultural)	These three monasteries, although located in different parts of Greece, are representative examples of the middle period of Byzantine religious architecture and they share the same aesthetic characteristics. All three churches share an octagonal plan; Nea Moni has a plain octagon while the two have the central space surrounded with a series of bays. The monasteries were decorated with marble works and mosaics in the 11th and 12th centuries. The Monastery of Hosios Loukas is pictured.
Pythagoreion and Heraion of Samos	A free standing column and ruins around	North Aegean	1992	595; ii, iii (cultural)	The island of Samos has a strategic position in the Aegean islands near Asia Minor. It was a strong nautical and commercial power, reaching its peak in the 6th century BCE. The site consists of the fortified ancient city (Pythagoreion) and the ancient Temple of Hera (Heraion). Samos is linked with important philosophers and mathematicians of the ancient world, including Pythagoras, Epicurus, and Aristarchus of Samos.
Archaeological Site of Aigai (modern name Vergina)	Facade of Philip 2 of Macedon tomb in Vergina, Greece. The door is made of marble and the order is doric.	Central Macedonia	1996	780; i, iii (cultural)	The ancient city of Aigai was the first capital of the Kingdom of Macedon. In addition to the monumental palace, lavishly decorated with mosaics and painted stuccoes, the site contains a burial ground with more than 300 tumuli, some of which date back to the 11th century BCE. One of the tumuli has been identified as that of Philip II of Macedon, father of Alexander the Great.
Archaeological site of Mycenae and Tiryns	The Lion Gate at Mycenae. Two lions on the portal.	Peloponnese	1999	941; i, ii, iii, iv, vi (cultural)	Mycenae and Tiryns were two of the most important cities of Mycenean Greece, which flourished between the 15th and 12th centuries BCE. The cities were palace economies with monumental architecture, such as the Lion Gate and Treasury of Atreus. The Linear B tablets are the first testimonies of the Greek language. Both cities are linked to the Homeric epics Iliad and Odyssey, which have influenced the European literature and arts ever since.
The Historic Centre (Chorá) with the Monastery of Saint-John the Theologian and the Cave of the Apocalypse on the Island of Pátmos	Monastery in dark stone, white houses below	South Aegean	1999	942; iii, iv, vi (cultural)	The Monastery of Saint-John the Theologian is dedicated to St John, who wrote both his Gospel and the Apocalypse on the island of Pátmos, according to Christian tradition. It was founded in the late 10th century and it has been a place of pilgrimage and Greek Orthodox learning ever since. The old settlement of Chorá, associated with the monastery, contains many religious and secular buildings.
Old Town of Corfu	View of Corfu from above, a fort in the background	Ionian Islands	2007	978; iv (cultural)	The roots of the Old Town of Corfu, on the eponymous island, date back to the 8th century BCE. Located at the entrance to the Adriatic Sea, the town was important in view of the defence of the maritime interests of the Republic of Venice against the Ottoman Empire. The Venetian engineers constructed three forts in the town. The Old Town buildings are mostly from the Venetian period and from the 19th century, when the island was a part of the British protectorate.
Archaeological Site of Philippi	Greek theatre, photo taken from the stands	Eastern Macedonia and Thrace	2016	1517; iii, iv (cultural)	Philippi was founded in 356 BCE by Philip II of Macedon. The city was a stop on the Via Egnatia and the site of the Battle of Philippi in 42 BCE. The Romans reshaped it into a "small Rome", adding public buildings including a Forum to Hellenistic ones. Following the visit of the Apostle Paul in 49–50 CE, the city became an early centre of the Christian faith, as demonstrated by the remains of Christian basilicas and an octagonal church.
Zagori Cultural Landscape	A stone bridge across dry stream	Epirus	2023	1695; v (cultural)	The cultural landscape along the Voidomatis river in the Pindus mountains comprises 45 stone-built villages. The villages are connected by a network of cobblestone paths and stone bridges (example pictured) to bridge the difficult terrain.
Minoan Palatial Centres	Throne room, frescoes on the walls depicting mythical animals	Crete	2025	1733; ii, iii, iv, vi (cultural)	The site covers six of the most important palatial centres (Knossos, Phaestos, Malia, Zakros, Zominthos and Kydonia) of the Minoan civilization, which was a major Bronze Age power. The Minoans were exercising an enormous influence on cultures of the East Mediterranean and feature in a series of ancient myths, including those of Daedalus and Icaros and of the Labyrinth. The Throne room at Knossos is pictured.
The wider area of Mount Olympus	Mountain peak, forest in front	Thessaly, Central Macedonia	2026	1719; vi, x (mixed)	Mount Olympus, the home of the Olympian gods, is the highest mountain in Greece, at 2,918 metres (9,573 ft). Many places of worship have been constructed on the mountain slopes, including the Chapel of the Prophet Elias at one of the peaks. The area is important in view of its mountain flora and fauna.

== Tentative list ==
In addition to the sites inscribed on the World Heritage list, member states can maintain a list of tentative sites that they may consider for nomination. Nominations for the World Heritage list are only accepted if the site has previously been listed on the tentative list. Greece has 11 sites on its tentative list.

Tentative sites
Site	Image	Location (region)	Year listed	UNESCO criteria	Description
Late Medieval Bastioned Fortifications in Greece	Castle wall overlooking a port	9 locations	2014	ii, iv, v (cultural)	The fortification system changed with the advent of gunpowder and thus more destructive means of warfare. Nine sites that are listed in this nomination represent examples of fortresses with bastions. They were built in the areas that often passed from the Venetian to Ottoman and other hands. The Old Town of Corfu is already a World Heritage Site. The fortress at Methoni is pictured.
National Park of Dadia – Lefkimi – Souflion	Three vultures, blurry image because of camera zoom	Eastern Macedonia and Thrace	2014	x (natural)	This forest area in the Rhodope Mountains is home to many birds of prey, including three out of four European vultures: Egyptian vulture, Griffon vulture, and Cinereous vulture. It is also located at the important bird migration route for birds of the Western Palaearctic.
Ancient Lavrion	Remains of a washing table at the mines	Attica	2014	ii, iv (cultural)	Mining activities in the Lavrion area have been recorded since the 4th millennium BCE and continued well into the 20th century. During the Classical period, the silver from the mines helped to fund the construction projects in Athens and to build the navy. The site covers the remains of the mines and the associated industry, as well as sites in the ancient settlement of Thoricus and the Temple of Poseidon in Sounion.
Petrified Forest of Lesvos	Parts of three petrified tree trunks	North Aegean	2014	vi, vii, viii, x (mixed)	The island of Lesbos was home to a mixed sub-tropical forest during the Early Miocene (18.5 million years ago, in the Burdigalian period). Due to volcanic eruptions that covered the area, plant remains have been preserved as fossils. The area was explored by the philosophers Aristotle and Theophrastus, who then wrote a series of influential texts on ecology, biology, geology, and mineralogy.
Archaeological site of Ancient Messene	Park with ruins of a temple	Peloponnese	2014	i, iii, vi (cultural)	Messene is located in a fertile valley near the mountain Ithome. The first temples and shrines on the site date back to the 9th and 8th centuries BCE, while the city of Ancient Messene was founded in 369 BCE by the Theban general Epaminondas. The site is well-preserved as it has not been destroyed or covered by later settlements.
Archaeological site of Nikopolis	Roman brick and stone ruins	Epirus	2014	ii, iv, vi (cultural)	The city of Nikopolis was founded by Augustus following the Battle of Actium in 31 BCE in the nearby area. It was a typical Roman colony city in Greek territory and was occupied until the 13th century. It was also an early centre of Christianity. Remains of monuments and public buildings have been preserved, as well as parts of a 50-kilometre (31 mi) long aqueduct.
The area of the Prespa Lakes: Megali and Mikri Prespa which includes Byzantines and post – Byzantine monuments	Lake with surrounding tree-covered hills	Western Macedonia	2014	ii, iv, vii, ix, x (mixed)	The area around the Prespa Lakes is rich in flora and fauna due to the habitat diversity, including wetlands, deciduous forests, and alpine meadows. The lakes are home to the largest breeding colony of Dalmatian pelicans, as well as several endemic plant and fish species. Many churches were built in the area in Byzantine and post-Byzantine times. Small Prespa Lake is pictured.
Gorge of Samaria National Park	Tourists walking through a gorge	Crete	2014	vii, viii, ix, x (natural)	The Samaria gorge is one of the gorges in the Lefka Ori mountains in western Crete. The area offers diverse habitats, from mountains reaching above 2,000 metres (6,600 ft) to the coast, as well as several deep caves. These ecosystems are home to the Cretan goat and several endemic species, including the bearded vulture, Cretan wildcat, and the Mediterranean monk seal.
Fortress of Spinalonga	Fortress wall facing the sea	Crete	2014	i, ii, iv, vi (cultural)	Spinalonga is a rocky islet off the northeastern coast of Crete. During the Venetian period, a fortress was built to protect the natural port of Elounda. The islet was taken by the Ottomans in the 18th century and it served as a leper colony in the first half of the 20th century.
Ancient Towers of the Aegean Sea	White circular tower made of marble	North Aegean, South Aegean	2014	iii, iv (cultural)	This nomination comprises ten towers, built on the Aegean Islands and on the mainland, mostly in the 4th and 3rd centuries BCE. They were built in non-urban areas and served defensive purposes, sometimes as a part of wider fortification systems, as well as watchtowers and lighthouses. The White Tower at Serifos is pictured.
Ancient Greek Theatres	Greek theatre in Delos, ruins	15 sites	2014	i, ii, iii, iv, v, vi (cultural)	This nomination lists 15 Greek theatres in different regions of Greece. Theatres were an indispensable element of urban centres from the Classical period onwards, attaining their full architectural form in the 4th century BCE. Some of the theatres in the nomination are parts of the existing World Heritage Sites: the Theatre of Epidaurus, the Theatre of Delphi, and the Theatre of Delos (pictured).

== See also ==
- List of Intangible Cultural Heritage elements in Greece
- Tourism in Greece
