= Minuscule 279 =

- New Testament manuscript
- Text: Gospels
- Date: 12th century
- Script: Greek
- Now at: Bibliothèque nationale de France
- Size: 17.4 cm by 13.7 cm
- Type: Byzantine text-type
- Category: none
- Note: full marginalia

Minuscule 279 (in the Gregory-Aland numbering), ε 293 (Soden), is a Greek minuscule manuscript of the New Testament, on parchment. Palaeographically it has been assigned to the 12th century. It has full marginalia.

== Description ==
The codex contains a complete text of the four Gospels on 250 parchment leaves (17.4 cm by 13.7 cm). The text is written in one column per page, in 23-26 lines per page.

The text is divided according to the κεφαλαια (chapters), whose numbers are given at the margin, and their τιτλοι (titles of chapters) at the top of the pages. There is also a division according to the Ammonian Sections (in Mark 241 Sections, the last in 16:20), with references to the Eusebian Canons (written below Ammonian Section numbers).

It contains the Eusebian tables at the beginning, tables of the κεφαλαια (tables of contents) before each Gospel, lectionary markings at the margin (for liturgical reading), synaxaria, and pictures.

The manuscripts has subscription:

το παρον τετραβαγγελον εκομισθει εκ της πατμω βιβλιοθηκης, παρ' εμου ιωσηφ γεωργειρηνη ταπεινου αρχιεπισκοπου σαμου και επεδωθει τω ευσεβεστατω και κραταιω βασιλει λοδοβικω τω μεγα εν ετουσ χυ αχος μαρτιου κε.

The same subscription appears in the codex 294.

== Text ==
The Greek text of the codex is a representative of the Byzantine text-type. Kurt Aland the Greek text of the codex did not place in any Category. According to the Claremont Profile Method it represents textual family K^{x} in Luke 1, in Luke 20 it has a mixture of the Byzantine text-families. In Luke 10 no profile was made.

== History ==
This manuscript together with codex 294 were brought from Patmos and given to Louis XIV in 1686 by Joseph Georgeirenus, Archbishop of Samos. It was added to the list of New Testament manuscripts by Scholz (1794-1852). It was examined and described by Paulin Martin. C. R. Gregory saw the manuscript in 1885.

The manuscript is currently housed at the Bibliothèque nationale de France (Gr. 86) at Paris.

== See also ==
- List of New Testament minuscules
- Biblical manuscript
- Textual criticism
