= Phora (Greece) =

Coordinates: 37°19′04″N 26°32′57″E

Phora (Ancient Greek: Φῶρα) was a town of ancient Greece on Patmos.

Its site is located on Patmos.
