= Minuscule 294 =

- New Testament manuscript
- Text: Gospels †
- Date: 1391
- Script: Greek
- Found: 1676
- Now at: Bibliothèque nationale de France
- Size: 11.5 cm by 8.8 cm
- Type: Byzantine text-type
- Category: none
- Note: marginalia

Minuscule 294 (in the Gregory-Aland numbering), ε 367 (Soden), is a Greek minuscule manuscript of the New Testament, on parchment, dated by a colophon to the year 1391 (or 1291 – Scrivener, Gregory). It has marginalia.

== Description ==
The codex contains the text of the four Gospels on 238 parchment leaves (11.5 cm by 8.8 cm), with some lacunae (Matthew 1:18-11:14). The text is written in one column per page, in 19-24 lines per page.

The text is divided according to the κεφαλαια (chapters), whose numbers are given at the margin, and the τιτλοι (titles of chapters) at the top of the pages. There is also a division according to the Ammonian Sections (in Mark 234, the last in 16:9), with references to the Eusebian Canons (written below Ammonian Section numbers).

It contains Prolegomena, lectionary markings at the margin for liturgical reading, and pictures.

The manuscripts have the subscription:

το παρον τετραβαγγελον εκομισθει εκ της πατμω βιβλιοθηκης, παρ' εμου ιωσηφ γεωργειρηνη ταπεινου αρχιεπισκοπου σαμου και επεδωθει τω ευσεβεστατω και κραταιω βασιλει λοδοβικω τω μεγα εν ετουσ χυ αχος μαρτιου κε.

The same subscription appears in codex 279.

== Text ==
The Greek text of the codex is a representative of the Byzantine text-type. Hermann von Soden classified it to the textual family K^{x}. Kurt Aland the Greek text of the codex did not place in any Category. According to the Claremont Profile Method, it represents the textual family K^{x} in Luke 1, Luke 10, and Luke 20. In the first part of Luke 20, it represents Π^{a}.

== History ==
The manuscript was written by Peter, a monk, in Jerusalem. Georgirene brought it in 1676 from Patmos to Paris and gave it to Louis XIV.

It was added to the list of New Testament manuscripts by Scholz (1794–1852). It was examined and described by Paulin Martin. C. R. Gregory saw it in 1885.

The manuscript is currently housed at the Bibliothèque Nationale de France (Gr. 118) at Paris.

== See also ==
- List of New Testament minuscules
- Biblical manuscript
- Textual criticism
