= Amphilochios (Makris) of Patmos =

Greek Orthodox monk and priest (1889-1970)

Saint Amphilochios Makris of Patmos

Starets
- Born: Athanasios Makris; December 13, 1889; Patmos, Greece
- Died: April 16, 1970 (aged 80); Patmos, Greece
- Venerated in: Eastern Orthodox Church
- Canonized: 29 August 2018 by the Ecumenical Patriarchate of Constantinople
- Feast: 16 April

Amphilochios Makris (Greek: Αμφιλόχιος Μακρής, 13 December 1889 – 16 April 1970) was a Greek Orthodox hieromonk, missionary, and teacher from the island of Patmos, Greece. He was greatly revered in Greece for his wisdom and experience as a starets (elder).

He was canonized on 29 August 2018 by the Holy Synod of the Ecumenical Patriarchate and his feast day is 16 April.

== Life and Works ==
Amphilochios was born Athanasios Makris in 1889 to a large, devout family from Patmos. The small island is where John of Patmos is believed to have authored the Book of Revelation.

At the age of seventeen, Athanasios obtained his parents' blessing to become a novice at the Monastery of St. John the Theologian, where he was given the name Amphilochios. He was tonsured to the Great Schema just seven years later and ordained to the diaconate in 1919. Shortly after, he was ordained to the priesthood and began serving as a confessor throughout the Italian-occupied islands of the Dodecanese. He was known for his love which he extended to all. He once said: “I was born to love people. It doesn't concern me if he is a Turk, black, or white. I see in the face of each person the image of God. And for this image of God I am willing to sacrifice everything.”

He resisted Italy's attempts at expansionism with great zeal in order to preserve the Orthodox Church and Greek identity. Upon being made abbot of the Monastery of Saint John in 1935, he built a knitting workshop as a guise under which children were taught Greek. When Italian occupying forces discovered this in 1937, Amphilochios was exiled to Athens. He spent the next two years travelling throughout the mainland of Greece, eventually settling in Crete and becoming the spiritual father of the land. He was allowed to return to Patmos in 1939 and lived out the rest of his days there in peace, assisting the nuns of Patmos and establishing an orphanage, as well as several charitable institutions. He received a forewarning of his repose at Pascha in 1968 and was given two years to prepare himself and his spiritual children for his departure.

When he reposed in 1970, onlookers noted that his face was filled with a remarkable beauty and peace.
