= Christodoulos of Patmos =

Byzantine monk (died 1093)

Saint Christodoulos (died on 16 March 1093) was a Byzantine monk who founded the Monastery of Saint John the Theologian on the island of Patmos in 1088.

== Life ==
Before c. 1050, Christodoulos undertook a pilgrimage from Asia Minor to the Holy Land, where he entered the Mar Saba Monastery, starting his monastic life. Following his return to Asia Minor, he pursued the monastic life in a number of locations, notably on Mount Olympus (Bithynia), at the monastery of Paul the Younger on Mount Latrus, and on the island of Kos. In time, he and his companions resolved to leave Kos for the uninhabited island of Patmos, whose relative isolation—owing in part to a harbour unsuitable for regular shipping—commended it as a place of withdrawal. Their decision was further influenced by the tradition that Patmos was the site at which John the Apostle composed the Book of Revelation. At Christodoulos' request, the emperor Alexios I Komnenos authorised the undertaking and granted permission for the establishment of a monastery in April 1088. The Monastery of Saint John the Theologian was accordingly founded on a site where a chapel dedicated to St John already stood, traditionally believed to occupy the location of a former pagan sanctuary of the goddess Artemis. Internal disputes among the monks, together with incursions by Turkish forces, eventually compelled Christodoulos to leave Patmos. He withdrew to the island of Euboea, where he died on 16 March 1093.

== Monastic rule ==
Christodoulos completed his monastic rule (Hypotyposis) in May 1091, drawing upon the principles of monastic life observed at the Mar Saba Monastery.

== Bibliography ==
- Boxall, Ian (2013). Patmos in the Reception History of the Apocalypse. Oxford Theology and Religion Monographs. Oxford University Press. ISBN 978-0-19-967420-6.
- Hamilton, Bernard; Jotischky, Andrew (2020). Latin and Greek Monasticism in the Crusader States. Cambridge University Press. ISBN 978-1-1390-1623-0.
