= List of Intangible Cultural Heritage elements in Greece =

The United Nations Educational, Scientific and Cultural Organisation (UNESCO) intangible cultural heritage elements are the non-physical traditions and practices performed by a people. As part of a country's cultural heritage, they include celebrations, festivals, performances, oral traditions, music, and the making of handicrafts. The "intangible cultural heritage" is defined by the Convention for the Safeguarding of Intangible Cultural Heritage, drafted in 2003 and took effect in 2006. Inscription of new heritage elements on the UNESCO Intangible Cultural Heritage Lists is determined by the Intergovernmental Committee for the Safeguarding of Intangible Cultural Heritage, an organisation established by the convention.

Greece ratified the convention on 3 January 2007.

== Intangible Cultural Heritage of Humanity ==
+ Transnational element

=== Representative List ===
Name	Image	Year	No.	Description
Mediterranean diet + (Note: Shared with Croatia, Cyprus, Italy, Morocco, Portugal, and Spain.)		2013	00884	The Mediterranean diet is the traditional food and methods of preparation used by the people of the Mediterranean basin, as well as everything related to it.
Know-how of cultivating mastic on the island of Chios		2014	00993	Mastic is a resin obtained from the mastic tree (Pistacia lentiscus). It is also known as tears of Chios, being traditionally produced on the island Chios, and, like other natural resins, is produced in "tears" or droplets.
Tinian marble craftsmanship		2015	01103	Marble craftsmanship on the island of Tinos.
Momoeria, New Year's celebration in eight villages of Kozani area, West Macedonia, Greece		2016	01184	New Year's celebration in Kozani area (Western Macedonia).
Rebetiko		2017	01291	Rebetiko can be described as the urban popular song of the Greeks, especially the poorest, from the late 19th century to the 1950s, and served as the basis for further developments in popular Greek music.
Art of dry stone construction, knowledge and techniques + (Note: Shared with Croatia, Cyprus, France, Italy, Slovenia, Spain, Switzerland, Andorra, Austria, Belgium, Ireland, and Luxembourg.)		2018	02106	Dry stone is a building method by which structures are constructed from stones without any mortar to bind them together.
Byzantine chant + (Note: Shared with Cyprus.)		2019	01508	The Byzantine chant in the Eastern Orthodox liturgy dates back to the Byzantine Empire.
August 15 (Dekapentavgoustos) festivities in two Highland Communities of Northern Greece: Tranos Choros (Grand Dance) in Vlasti and Syrrako Festival		2022	01726	August 15 festivities: Grand Dance in Vlasti and Festival in Syrrako.
Transhumance, the seasonal droving of livestock + (Note: Shared with Albania, Andorra, Austria, Croatia, France, Italy, Luxembourg, Romania, and Spain.)		2023	01964	Transhumance is a type of pastoralism or nomadism, a seasonal movement of livestock between fixed summer and winter pastures.
Messosporitissa Festivity (All-holy Mother of God of the Mid-Sowing Season Festivity), Feast of Our Lady at the Ancient Ruins		2024	02101	

=== Good Safeguarding Practices ===
Name	Year	No.	Description
Polyphonic Caravan, researching, safeguarding and promoting the Epirus polyphonic song	2020	01611	The Polyphonic Caravan is a project to research, safeguard and promote the Epirus polyphonic song.

== See also ==
- List of World Heritage Sites in Greece
