= Cave of the Apocalypse =

UNESCO World Heritage Site
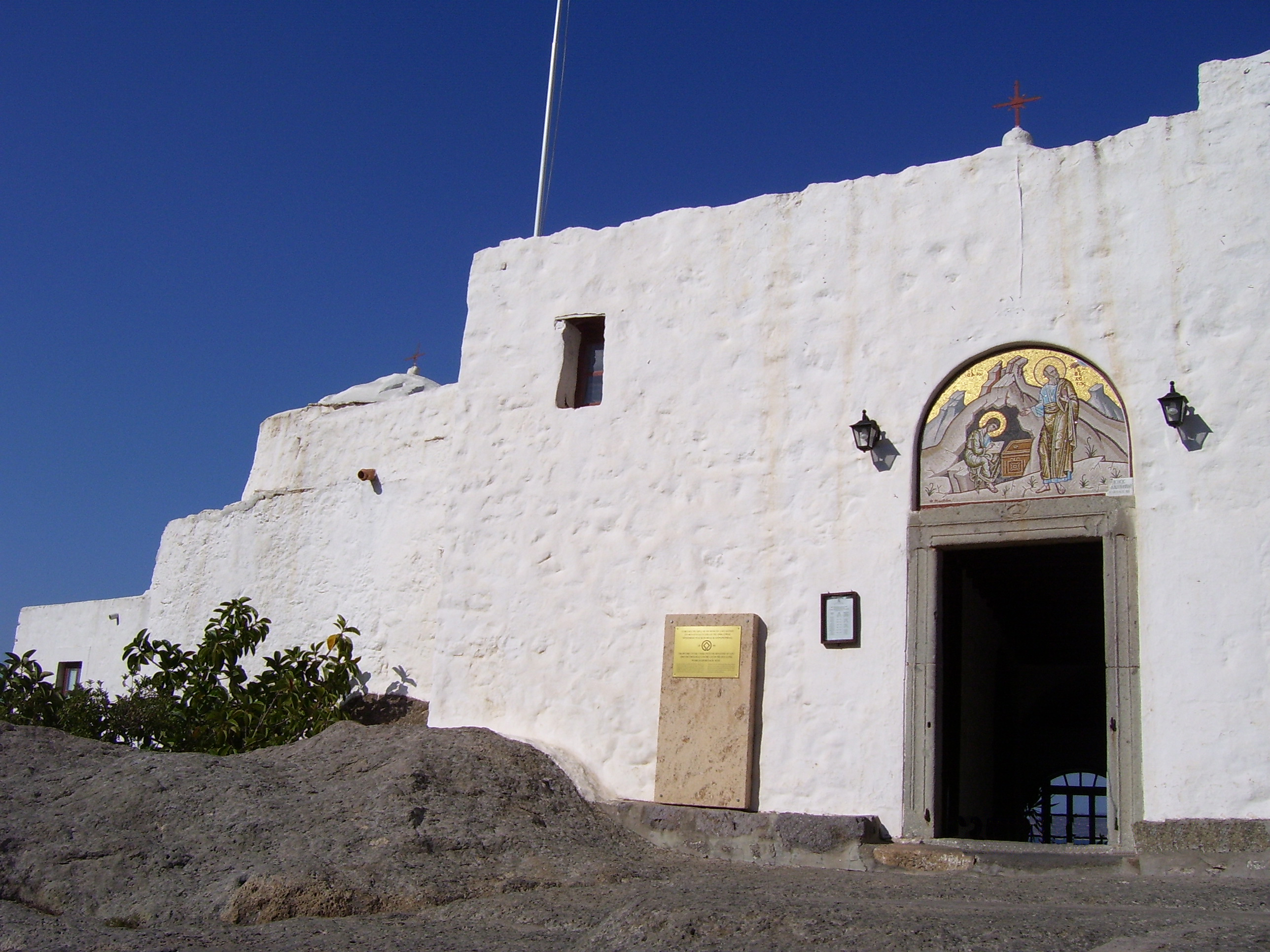
- The entrance to the Apocalypse complex

- Location within Greece
- Location: Patmos, Greece
- Part of: The Historic Centre (Chorá) with the Monastery of Saint-John the Theologian and the Cave of the Apocalypse on the Island of Pátmos
- Criteria: Cultural: (iii)(iv)(vi)
- Reference: 942
- Inscription: 1999 (23rd Session)
- Coordinates: 37°18′51.91″N 26°32′40.80″E

The Cave of the Apocalypse (Greek: Σπήλαιο Αποκάλυψης, pronounced [sp'ileo.apok'alipsis]) is located approximately halfway up the mountain on the Aegean island of Patmos, along the road between the villages of Chóra and Skala. This grotto marks the spot where St. John of Patmos received his visions that he recorded in the Book of Revelation. It became a location of Christian pilgrimage and is recognized as a Greek Orthodox Church to this day. In 1999, UNESCO declared the cave a joint World Heritage Site (together with the Monastery of Saint John the Theologian that lies at the highest point on the island), as one of the most sacred sites of Christianity.

== History ==
=== St. John of Patmos ===
St. John of Patmos (also known as John the Revelator, John the Divine, or John the Theologian) was a member of Jesus Christ's inner circle (The Twelve Disciples). The Roman Empire deemed the early Christians a strange cult and were recognized as troublesome individuals and potential issues for the Empire. During the 1st century under the Roman rule of Domitian, several followers of Christ were persecuted and exiled to the island Patmos. Banishment during this time period was a common punishment for crimes such as practicing magic and/or astrology. To the Roman Empire, prophecy was an identical offense whether Pagan, Christian, or Jewish, as the Romans viewed it as a threat to their power. For this reason, St. John of Patmos, among countless others, were sent to Patmos to serve out their prison sentence under the harsh conditions of the small and rocky island.

On this island, St. John received visions of the final days of Earth, witnessing destruction of the old Earth and the creation of the new Earth as the Holy City of Jerusalem came down from heaven. The cave became a place of refuge for him, and his faithful disciple and scribe Prochorus who had also been exiled. It has been told in Christian tradition that the rock inside the cave was shredded, and through three thin openings, symbolizing the Holy Trinity, he heard a loud voice in his head instructing him to write down what he saw in a book and send it to the seven churches. The location on the island in which he received and recorded these visions became known as the Cave of the Apocalypse to signify the event of the end of the world, and he compiled his writings into what became known as the Book of Revelation in the bible.

=== The Monastery of St. John the Theologian ===
The Monastery of St. John the Theologian (also known as the Monastery of St. John the Divine) is a Greek Orthodox monastery dedicated to St. John of Patmos. It was founded in 1088 and is located at the highest point of the island. In 1088, the Byzantine Emperor, Alexios Komnenos, gave the island of Patmos as a gift to the soldier and priest, John Christodoulos. The majority of the monastery was built by Christodoulos himself within the next three years. The monastery itself dominates the island which led to the colonization of the town below that came to be called Chóra. The monastery is characterized as a polygonal castle with towers and crenellations, the battlements of a castle, with a collection of manuscripts, liturgical art and objects, and icons within.

The monastery's exterior was heavily fortified due to the threat of piracy and possible attacks by the Seljuk Turks during the time period. The primary elements of the monastery were originally designed and built in the late 10th century. The most notable parts of the monastery included the Katholikon, which was the main church, the Chapel of Panagia, and the refectory, a room used for communal meals. The castle itself is lined with white walls of monastic cells on the north and west sides of the courtyard, and the southern portion of the building is formed by a two-story arcade called the Tzafara. This section of the monastery rebuilt in dressed stone in 1698, and finally, the east side of the castle is formed by the Katholikon. The monastery was eventually declared a World Heritage Site by UNESCO in 1999.

=== The Chóra of Patmos ===
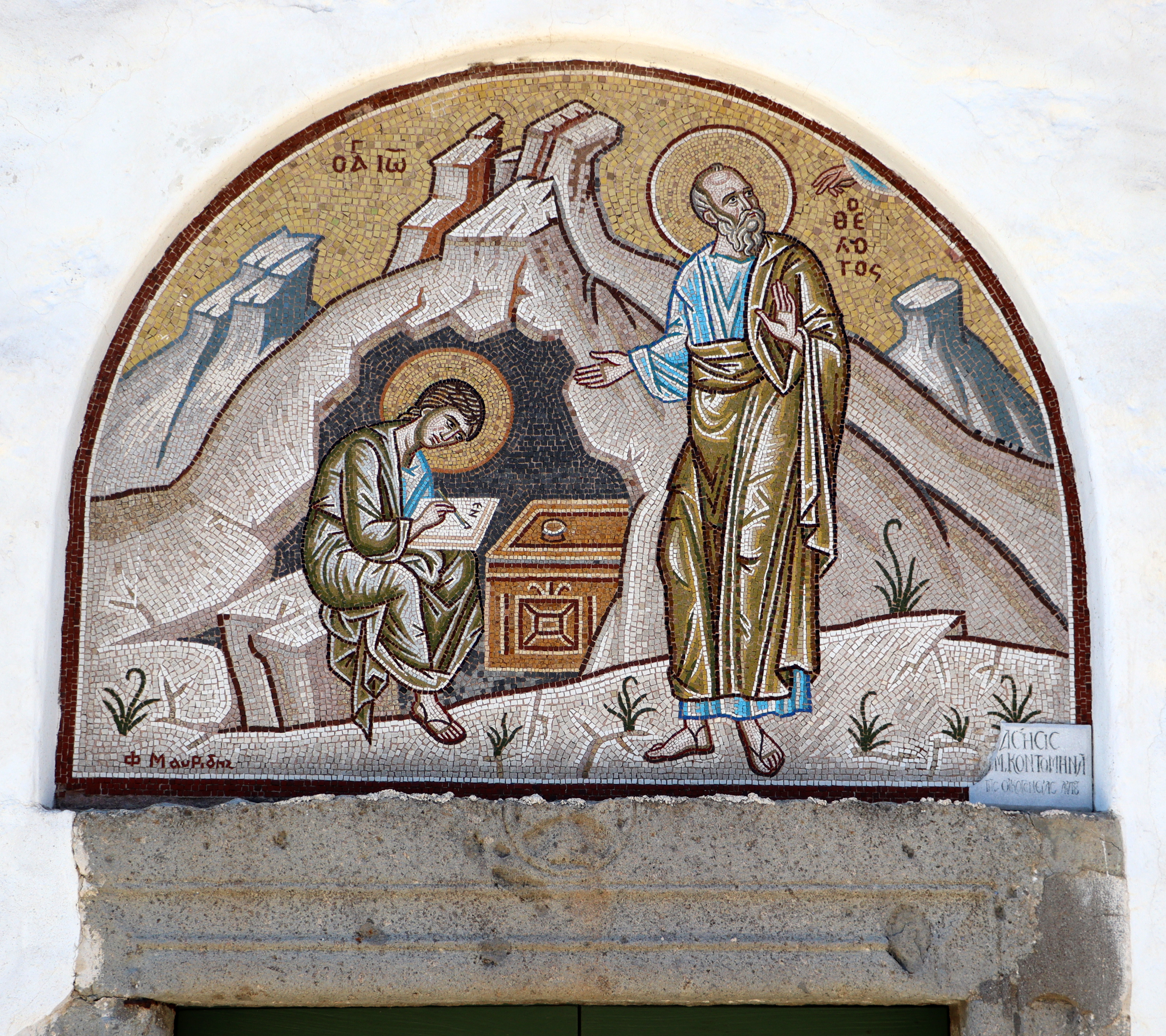
Mosaic above the entrance to the Cave of the Apocalypse, depicting, according to the text near the top of the mosaic, "Ὁ Ἅγιος Ιωάννης ο Θεολόγος" ("Saint John the Theologian") and his disciple Prochoros, who transfers John's visions into writing

The settlement of Chóra is the main town of Patmos located 4 kilometers from Skala, the only commercial port on the island, and is located at the highest point of the island surrounding the monastery of St. John of Patmos. It has continued to evolve since the 11th century, when a vast number of people began to settle here, and is one of very few settlements in Greece that has done so uninterrupted since the 12th century. The town has served as the main governor and regulator of the social life of the islanders since its colonization. The building of the monastery dedicated to St. John of Patmos shifted the island to a significant place of pilgrimage leading people to build and settle in the area below. In the 13th century, the town begun expanding, and by the 15th century it became a popular destination for refugees from Constantinople. This led to refugees from Crete seeking Chóra as a location to settle down as well.

By the 16th and 17th centuries the island became a trading center under Ottoman rule, and the success as a trading center was reflected by the exquisite houses in Chóra. The town was characterized by white-washed houses, the homes of the fine merchants, small plazas, and narrow streets. Many religious and secular are associated with the town of Chóra as the town contains several small churches, mainly built in the 17th and 18th centuries which incorporate a vast amount of sacred paintings, icons, and other church furnishings. It is one of the few areas in the world where religious ceremonies dating back to the early times of Christianity are still being practiced.

The only method in which the town can be reached is through a driveway that runs across the entire island. There is a clear definition between the urban and surrounding rural area, with the monastery of St. John of Patmos being the center of the town. The structure of the city is highly compact with very narrow streets and walkways, and the houses are along the inclined streets of the island giving them an uneven look. However, in the world today, the historic settlement faces the abandonment of its inhabitants due to great interest in transforming the town in order to make it a location for mass tourism.

=== Christian religion ===
From the earliest known times of Jesus Christ, there were passages in the Gospels that make it evident that Jesus himself believed that the apocalypse was to occur at some point in time. He pointed out to his disciples that there would be signs such as war and conflict when the world was on the verge of coming to an end. This idea of the apocalypse was serious for the early church when Jesus Christ died as they were left in panic of his final words. However, when he rose again on the third day, the apocalyptic portions of the text became discouraged as Christians believed their savior had returned. After St. John of Patmos was sent to the island to serve his prison sentence and received his visions of the apocalypse, he sent his writings to the churches which caused the fear and possibility of the apocalypse to return in Christian religion. This change in Christian theology is now associated with the cave of the apocalypse as it is the origin of St. John's visions and the location of the theological change.

== Interior features ==
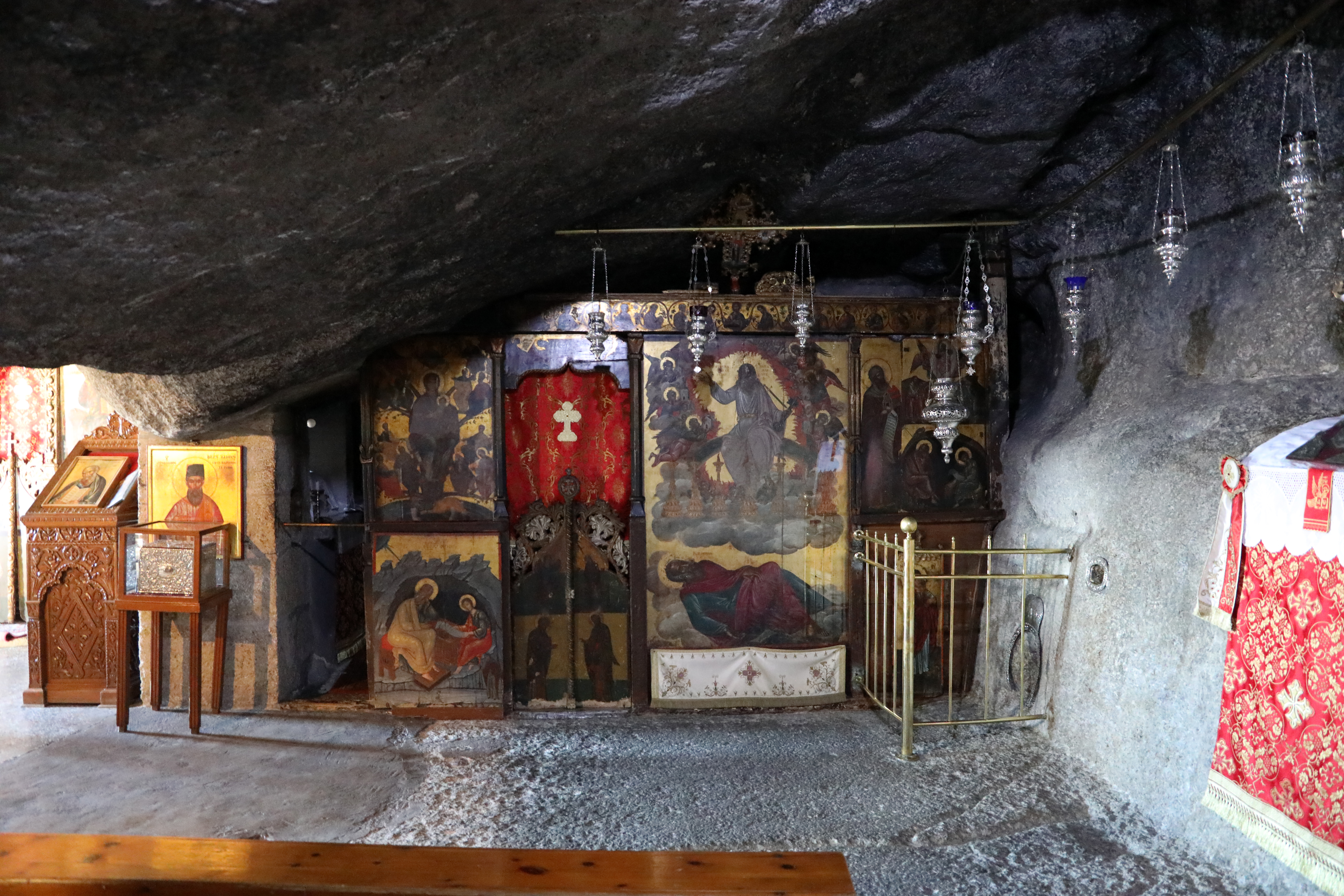
Interior of the church

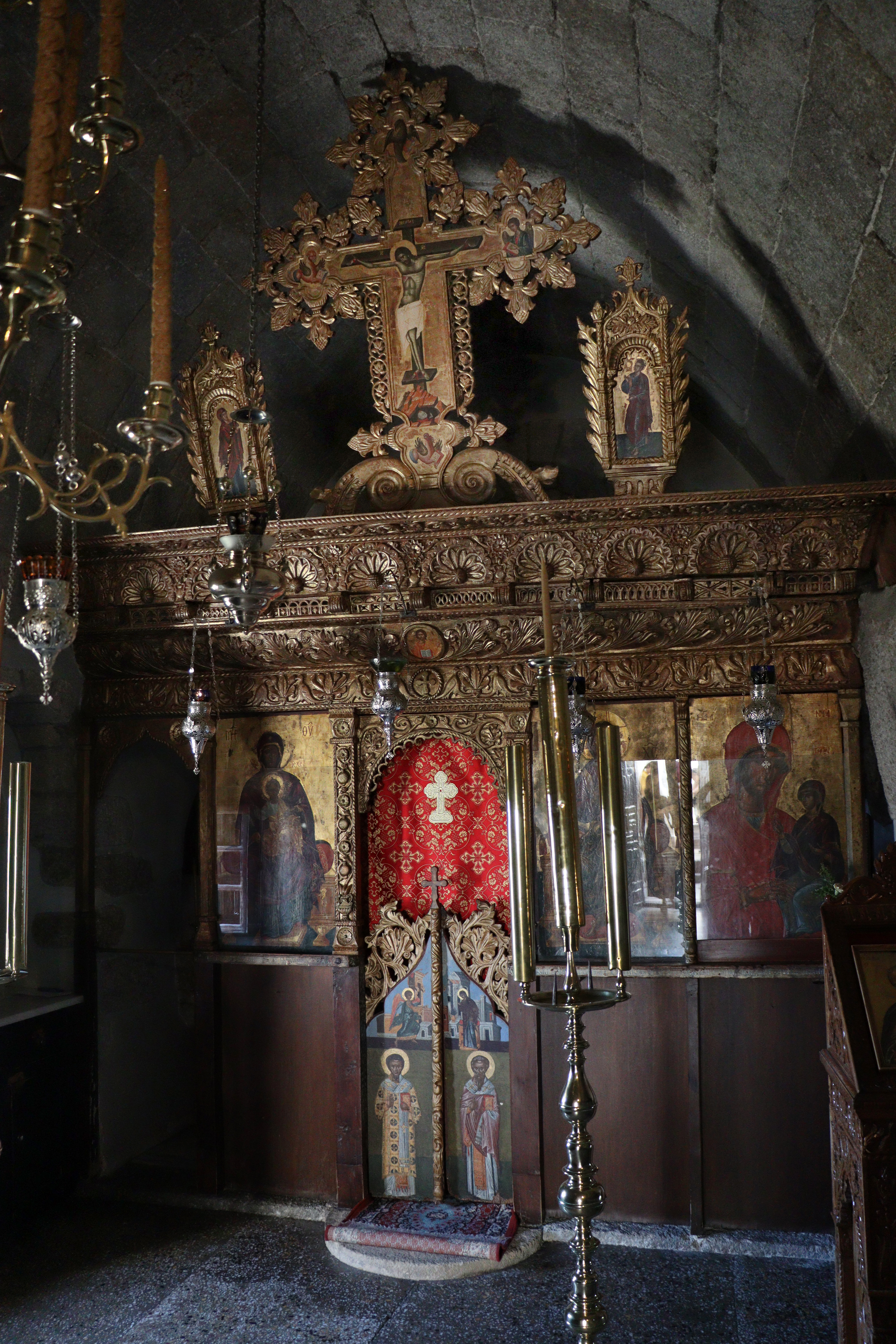
Main iconostases of the church

There are several portraits and sculptures on the interior walls of the cave dedicated to the apostle as the cave has become a place of worship and devoutness for pilgrims to experience where the Apocalypse was written. The recognition of the cave as Orthodox asserts a physical connection to St. John himself. Within the cave, there are a number of features that, during his time, St. John used for natural actions such as resting. Inside the cave wall, there is a hollow portion in one of the walls which is believed to be an area in which the elderly St. John would rest, with the wall itself having a place to grip to help him in raising himself up. These features also included a natural ledge in which the seer may have placed his scroll for the recording of his visions by his scribe. The interior features of the cave tell the story of St. John's time on the island and represent his legacy.

In modern times, the cave is considered a sacred area holding what is now a temple dedicated to St. John. It has become a popular tourist site where visitors have the opportunity to see where St. John recorded his visions. People may touch the three narrow openings in the rock which is believed to have allowed God's voice to get through to St. John, and they may also experience the rock in which he sat and the crevices in the wall he used to stand up. A lectern used by Prochorus himself as he aided St. John in his work, built at human height, is also accessible to visitors. It is now a place of silence and prayer available to the public.

== Geography ==
The island of Patmos is a small volcanic island located in the central area of the Aegean Sea, off the west coast of Turkey and Asia. It is one of the northernmost islands of the Dodecanese complex. The Cave of the Apocalypse is situated about midway up the mountain along a steep road that stems from Skala to Chóra and leads to a temple dedicated to Artemis. Around the cave's entrance was a chapel devoted to the mother of Alexios Komnenos called the Chapel of St. Anne.
