= Monastery of Saint John the Theologian =

Revelation monastery in Patmos, Greece

Monastery of Saint-John the Theologian Μονή του Αγίου Ιωάννου του Θεολόγου
UNESCO World Heritage Site
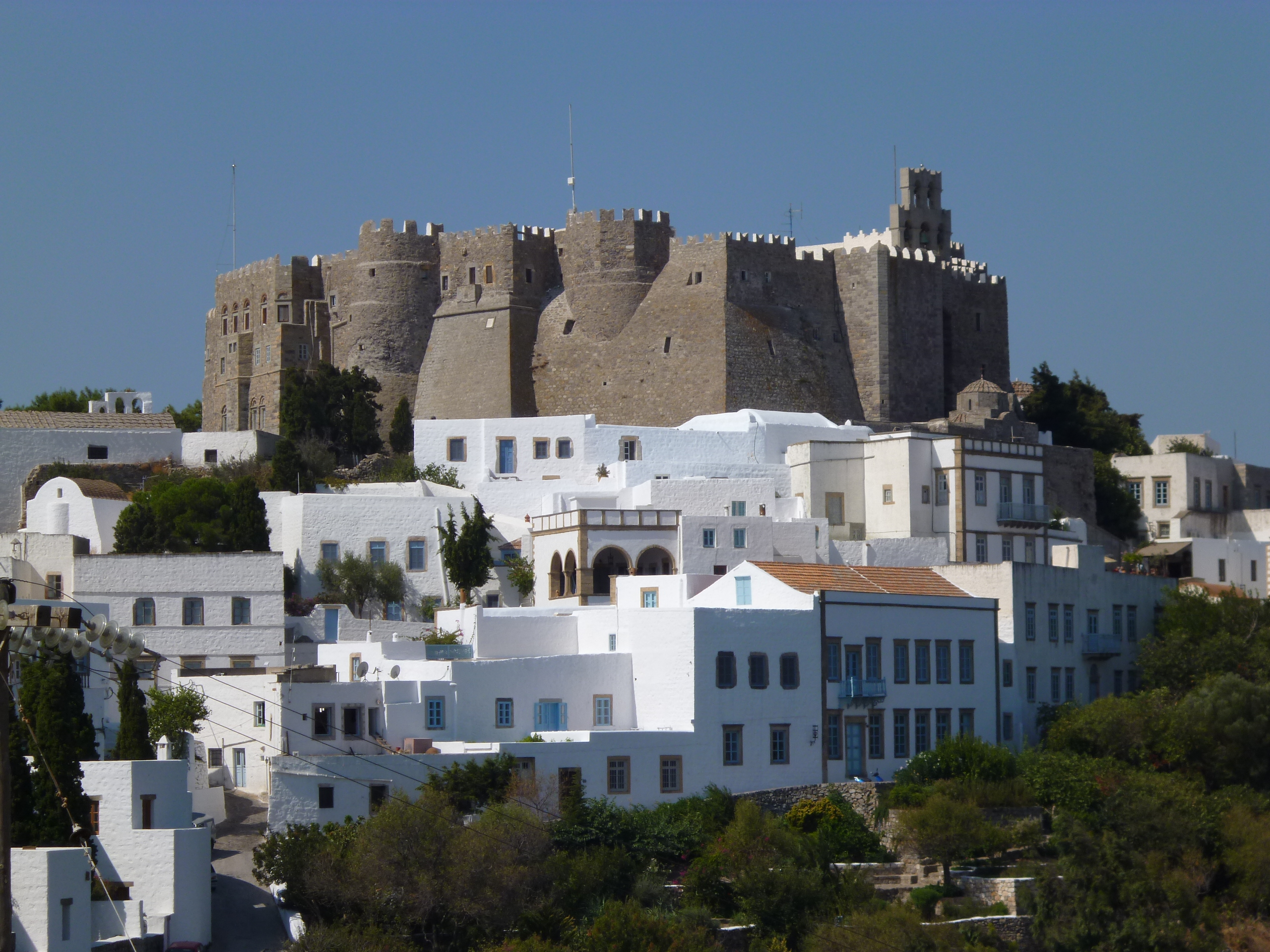
- Exterior view of the monastery walls

- Location within Greece
- Interactive map of Monastery of Saint-John the Theologian; Μονή του Αγίου Ιωάννου του Θεολόγου
- Location: Patmos, Greece
- Part of: The Historic Centre (Chorá) with the Monastery of Saint-John the Theologian and the Cave of the Apocalypse on the Island of Pátmos
- Criteria: Cultural: (iii)(iv)(vi)
- Reference: 942
- Inscription: 1999 (23rd Session)
- Coordinates: 37°18′33″N 26°32′53″E

The Monastery of Saint John the Theologian (Greek: Μονή του Αγίου Ιωάννου του Θεολόγου, romanized: Moní tou Agíou Ioánnou tou Theológou; also called Monastery of Saint John the Divine) is a Greek Orthodox monastery founded in 1088 in Chora on the island of Patmos. It is named after St John of Patmos, the author of the Christian Book of Revelation who, according to the text, lived on the island when visions of the apocalypse came to him. Since its founding, the monastery has been a pilgrimage site and a place of Greek Orthodox learning and worship. The monastery is unique in that it integrated from its founding the surrounding community of Chora, which was built around its fortifications. Religious ceremonies that date back to the early Christian period are still practiced within the monastery today. Because of its sacred significance, uninterrupted architectural evolution, and the exceptional preservation of early Christian customs, the monastery was declared a UNESCO World Heritage Site in 1999, along with the town of Chora and the nearby Cave of the Apocalypse.

== History ==
In 1088, Byzantine Emperor Alexios I Komnenos gave the island of Patmos to a monk, Christodoulos. The greater part of the monastery was completed by Christodoulos three years later. He heavily fortified the exterior because of the threats of piracy and Seljuk Turks. The oldest parts of the monastery are the Katholikón (main church) and the refectory, dating from the 11th century. The Katholikón has the typical shape of a Byzantine church, with a domed cross-in-square style. The floor is elaborately carved out of marble is opus sectile style, and has wall paintings and frescoes dating to the Middle Ages. A two-storied arcade on the south side of the monastery was built in 1698.

At least 330 manuscripts are housed in the library (267 on parchment), including 82 manuscripts of the New Testament. Minuscules: 1160–1181, 1385–1389, 1899, 1901, 1966, 2001–2002, 2080–2081, 2297, 2464–2468, 2639, 2758, 2504, 2639, and lectionaries.

As of 2012, 40 monks reside at the monastery. The monastery has, amongst its relics, the skull of Saint Thomas the Apostle.

== Gallery ==
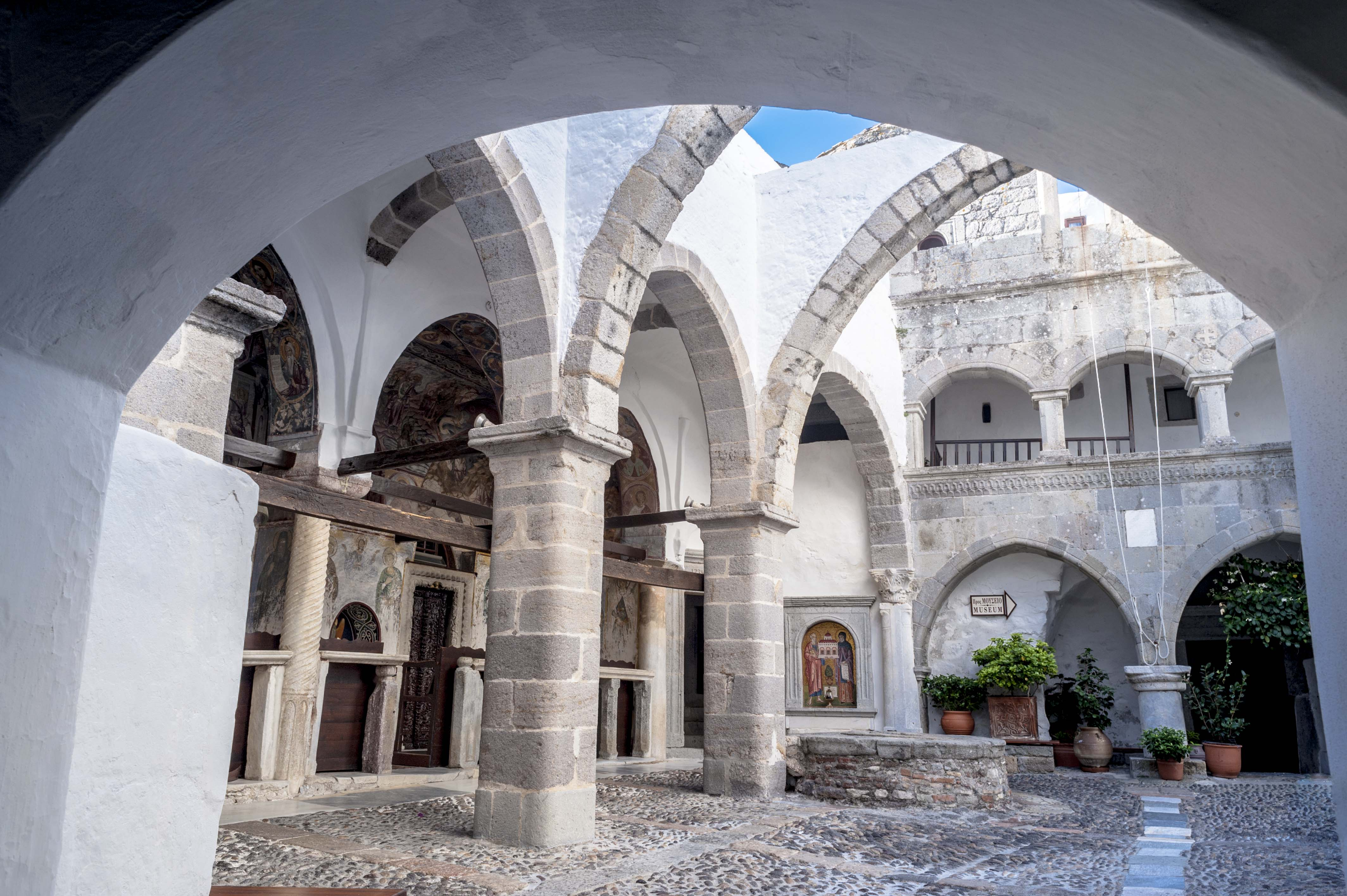
Interior of monastery

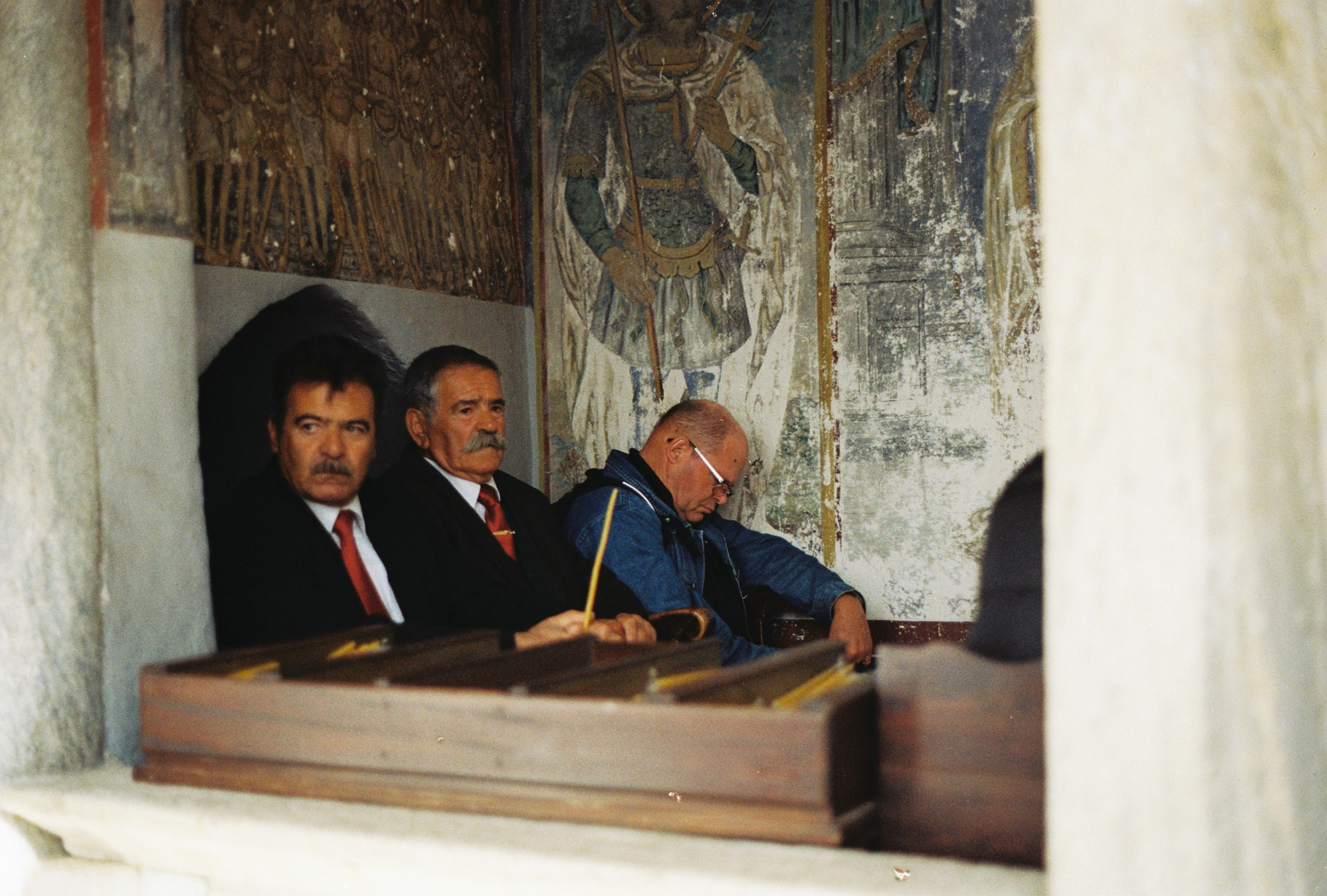
Men at Monastery of Saint John's during Easter Celebrations

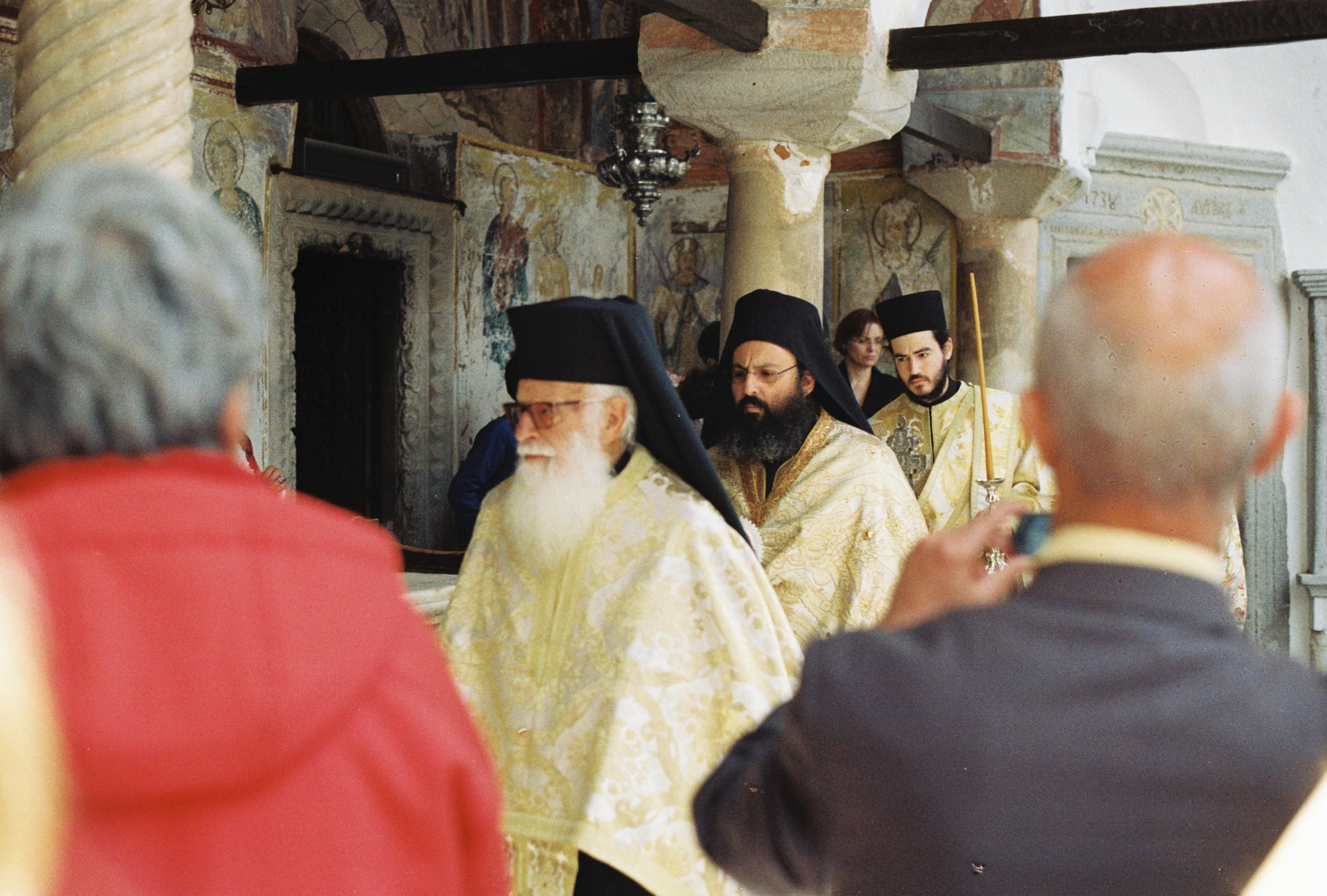
Orthodox Priests enter the Monastery of Saint Johns
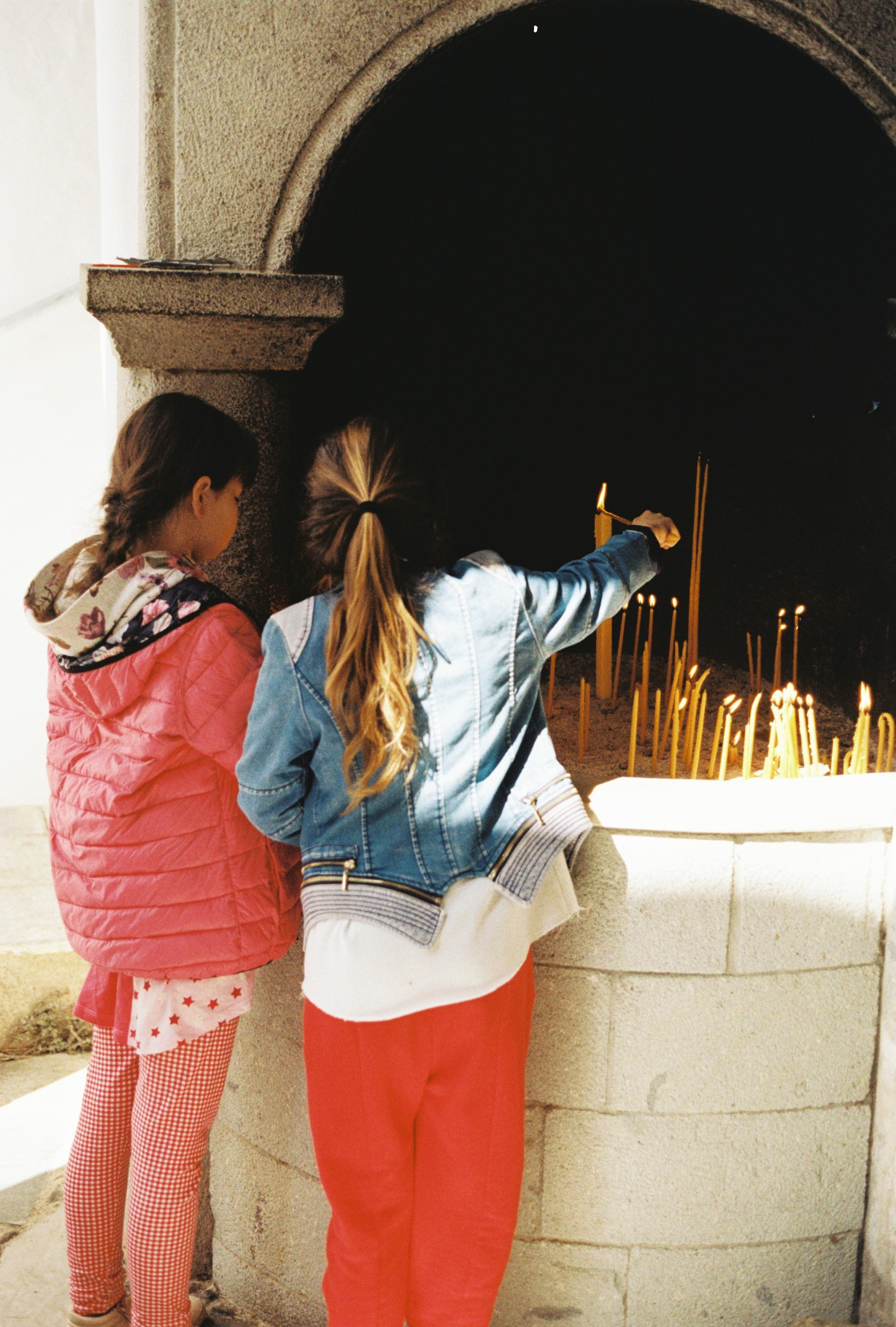
Girls lighting Candles at Monastery of Saint Johns

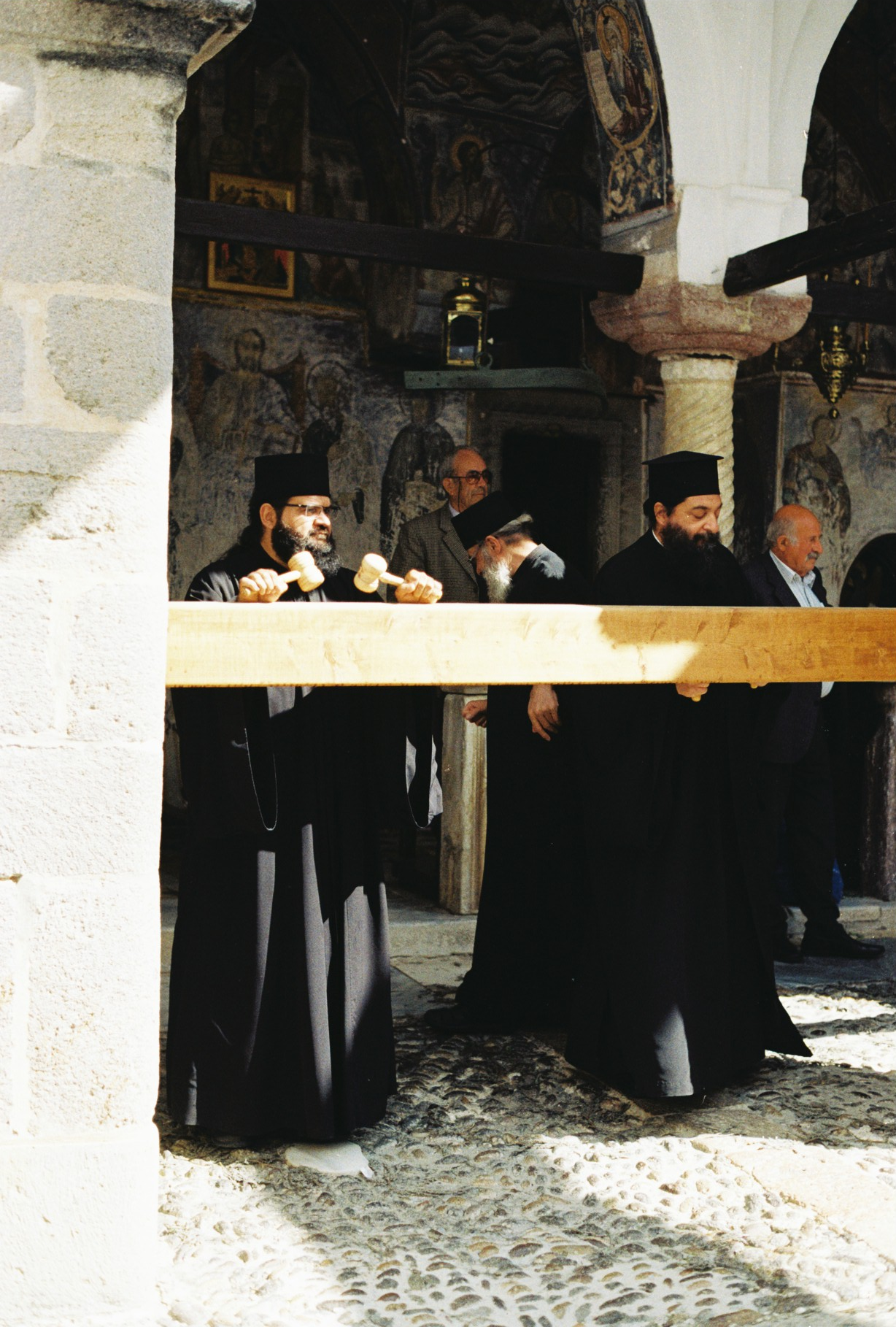
Greek orthodox Priests at Monastery of Saint John's

== See also ==
- Cave of the Apocalypse
- Codex Petropolitanus Purpureus
- Minuscule 2464
- Uncial 0150
- Uncial 0151
