= Patmos =

Greek island in the Aegean Sea

Patmos Πάτμος
- Municipality
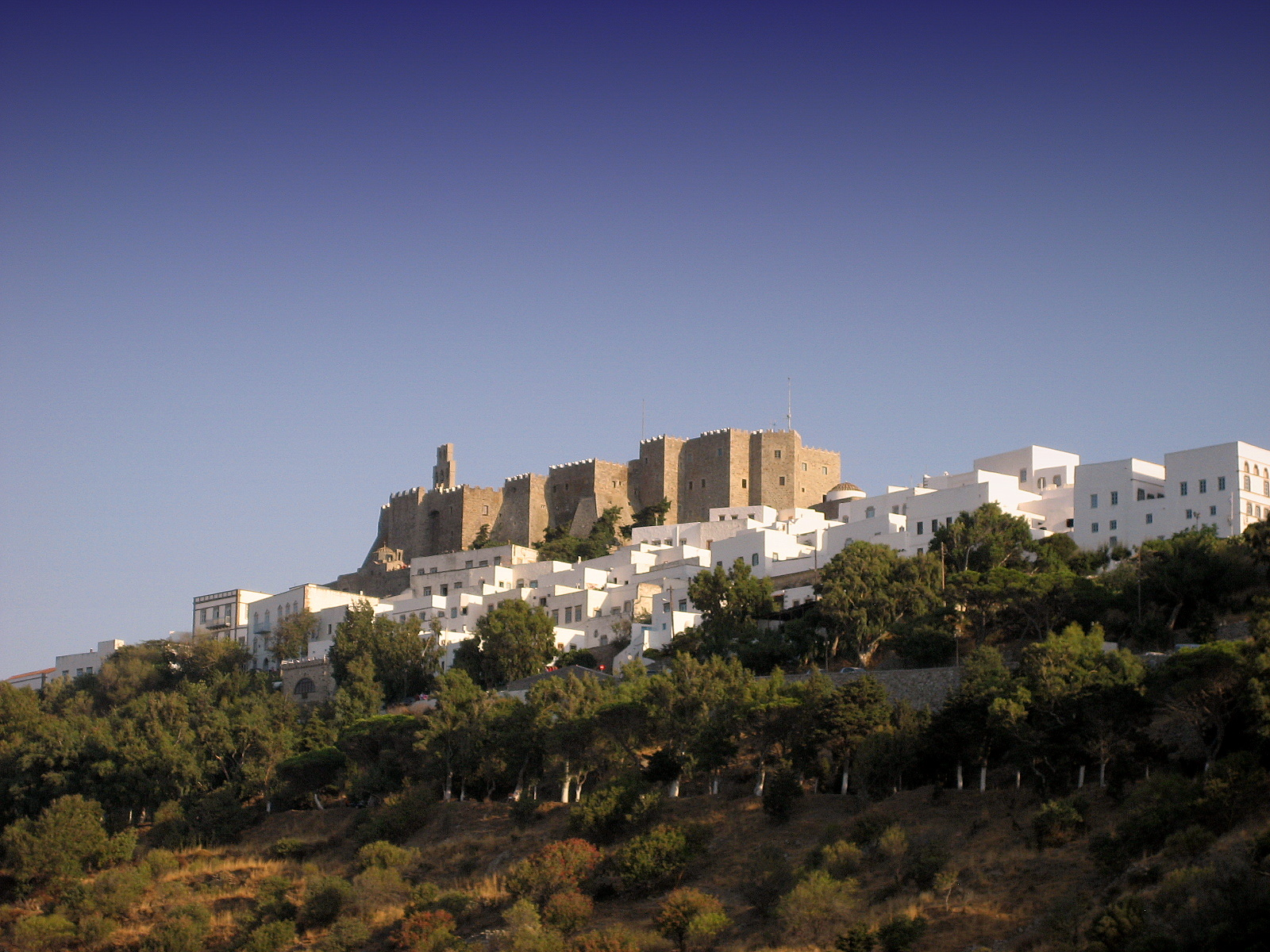
- Chora and the Castle of Patmos

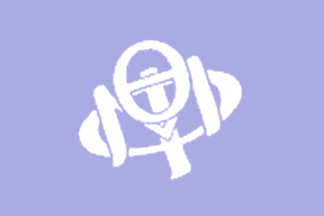
- Flag

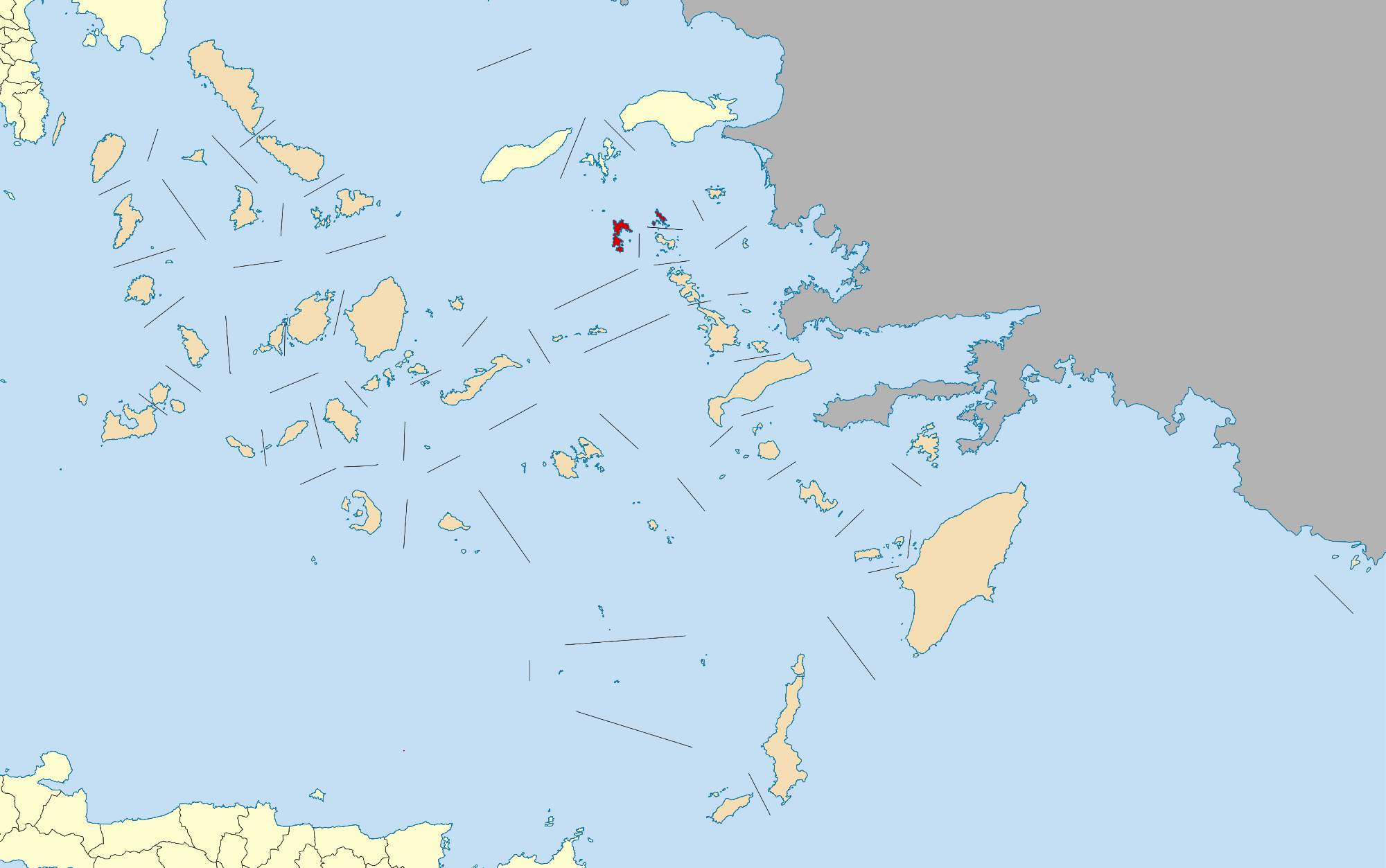

- Location within Greece
- Coordinates: 37°19.5′N 26°32.5′E
- Country: Greece
- Administrative region: South Aegean
- Regional unit: Kalymnos

Government
  - Mayor: Nikitas Tsampalakis (since 2023)

Area
  - Municipality: 45.0 km^{2} (17.4 sq mi)
- Highest elevation: 270 m (890 ft)
- Lowest elevation: 0 m (0 ft)

Population (2021)
  - Municipality: 3,283
  - Density: 73.0/km^{2} (189/sq mi)
- Time zone: UTC+2 (EET)
  - Summer (DST): UTC+3 (EEST)
- Postal code: 855 xx
- Area code: 22470
- Vehicle registration: KX, PO, PK
- Website: www.patmos.gr

Patmos (Greek: Πάτμος, pronounced [ˈpatmos]) is a Greek island in the Aegean Sea. It is famous as the place where, according to Christian belief, John of Patmos received the vision found in the Book of Revelation of the New Testament, and where the book was written.

One of the northernmost islands of the Dodecanese complex, Patmos has a population of 3,283 (2021) and an area of 34.05 km^{2} (13.15 sq mi). The highest point is Profitis Ilias, 269 metres (883 ft) above sea level. The municipality of Patmos, which includes the offshore islands of Arkoi (pop. 44), Marathos (pop. 5), and several uninhabited islets, has a population of 3,047 (2011 census) and a combined land area of 45.039 square kilometres (17.390 sq mi). It is part of the Kalymnos regional unit.

In 1999, the island's historic center, Chora, along with the Monastery of Saint John the Theologian and the Cave of the Apocalypse were declared World Heritage Sites by UNESCO because of their significance in Christianity and the preservation of ancient religious ceremonies on the island. The monastery was founded by Christodoulos Latrinos. Patmos is also home to the Patmian School, a notable Greek seminary.

== History ==
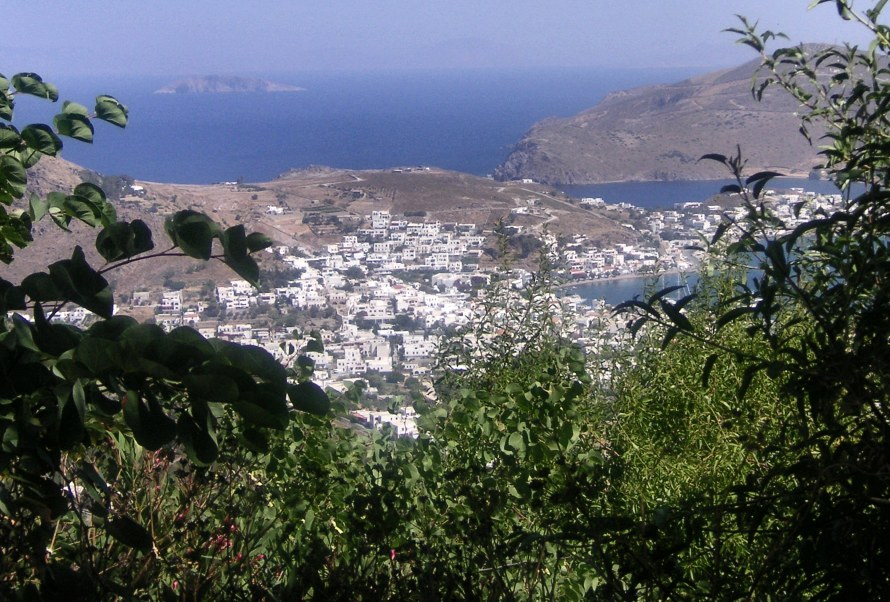
View of the port (Skala)

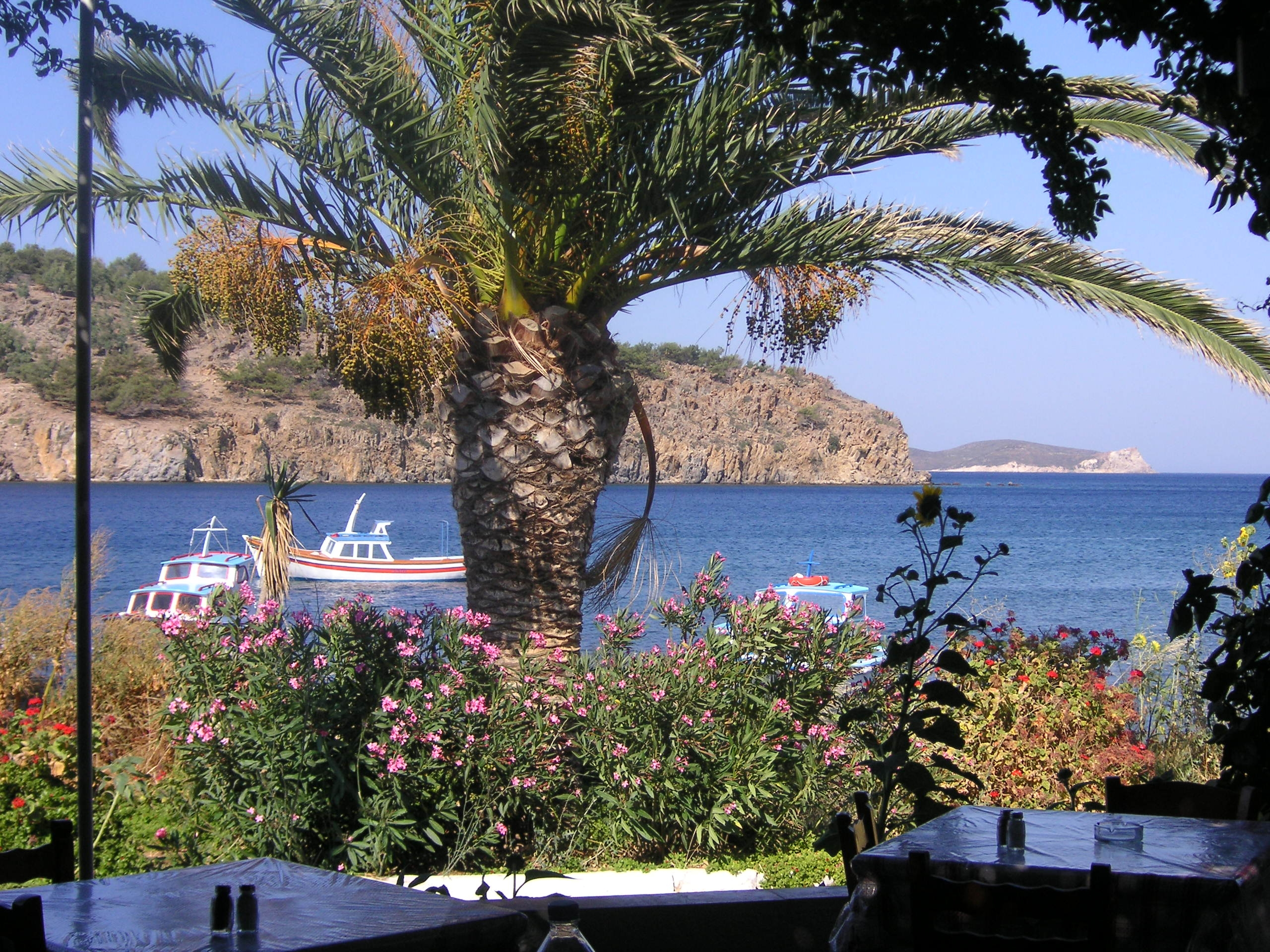
The beach of Meloi, within walking distance of Skala

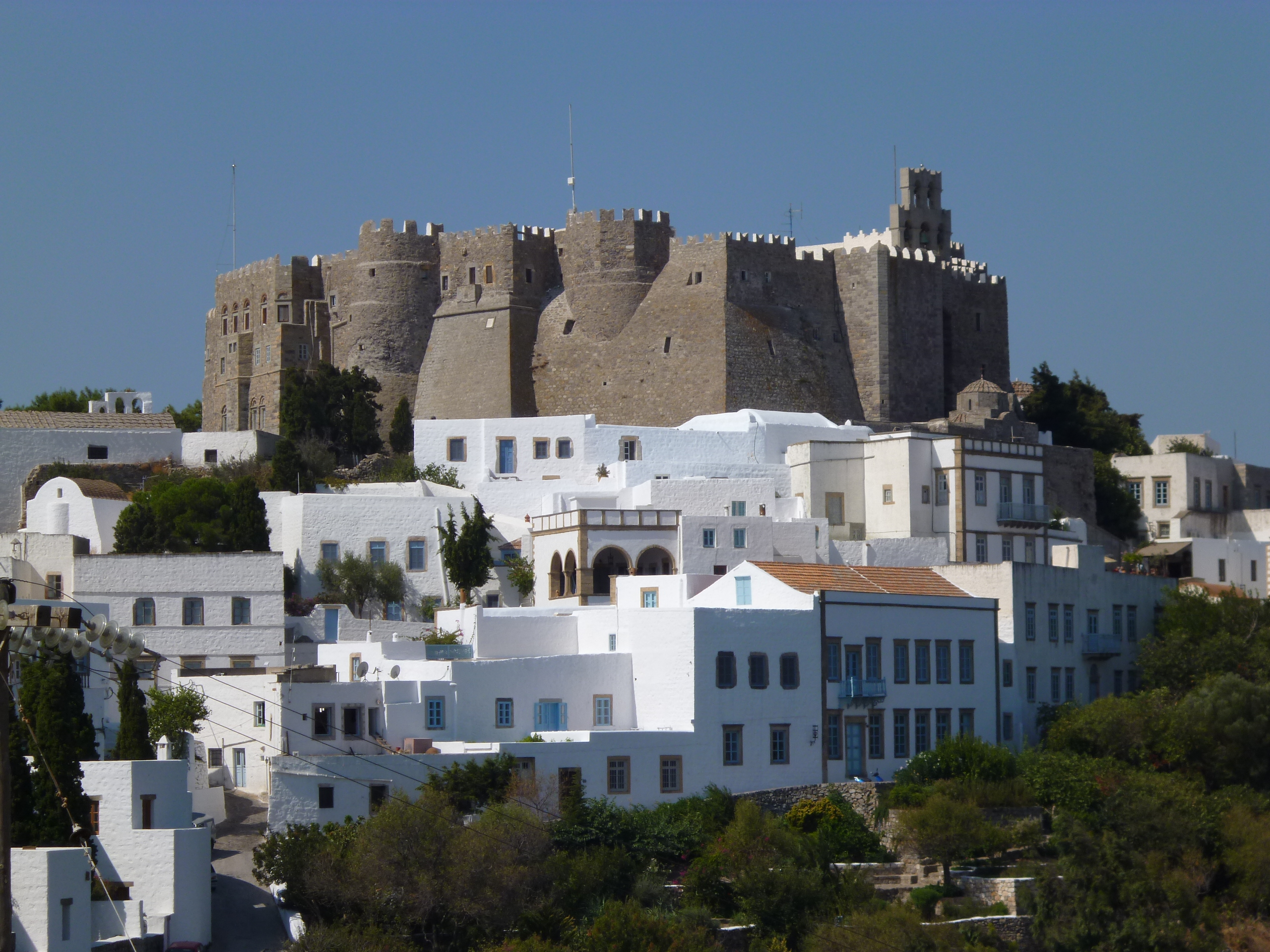
Monastery of Saint John the Theologian

=== The birth of Patmos according to Greek mythology ===
According to a legend in Greek mythology, the island's original name was "Letois", after the goddess and huntress of deer, Artemis, daughter of Leto. It was believed that Patmos came into existence thanks to her divine intervention.

Artemis frequently paid visits to Caria, the mainland across the shore from Patmos, where she had a shrine on Mount Latmus. There she met the moon goddess Selene, who cast her light on the ocean, revealing the sunken island of Patmos.

Selene was always trying to get Artemis to bring the sunken island to the surface and hence to life. Selene finally convinced Artemis, who then gained her brother Apollo's help to persuade Zeus to allow the island to rise from the sea.

Zeus agreed, and the island emerged from the water. The sun dried up the land and brought life to it. Gradually, inhabitants from the surrounding areas, including Mount Latmos, settled on the island and named it "Letois" in honour of Artemis.

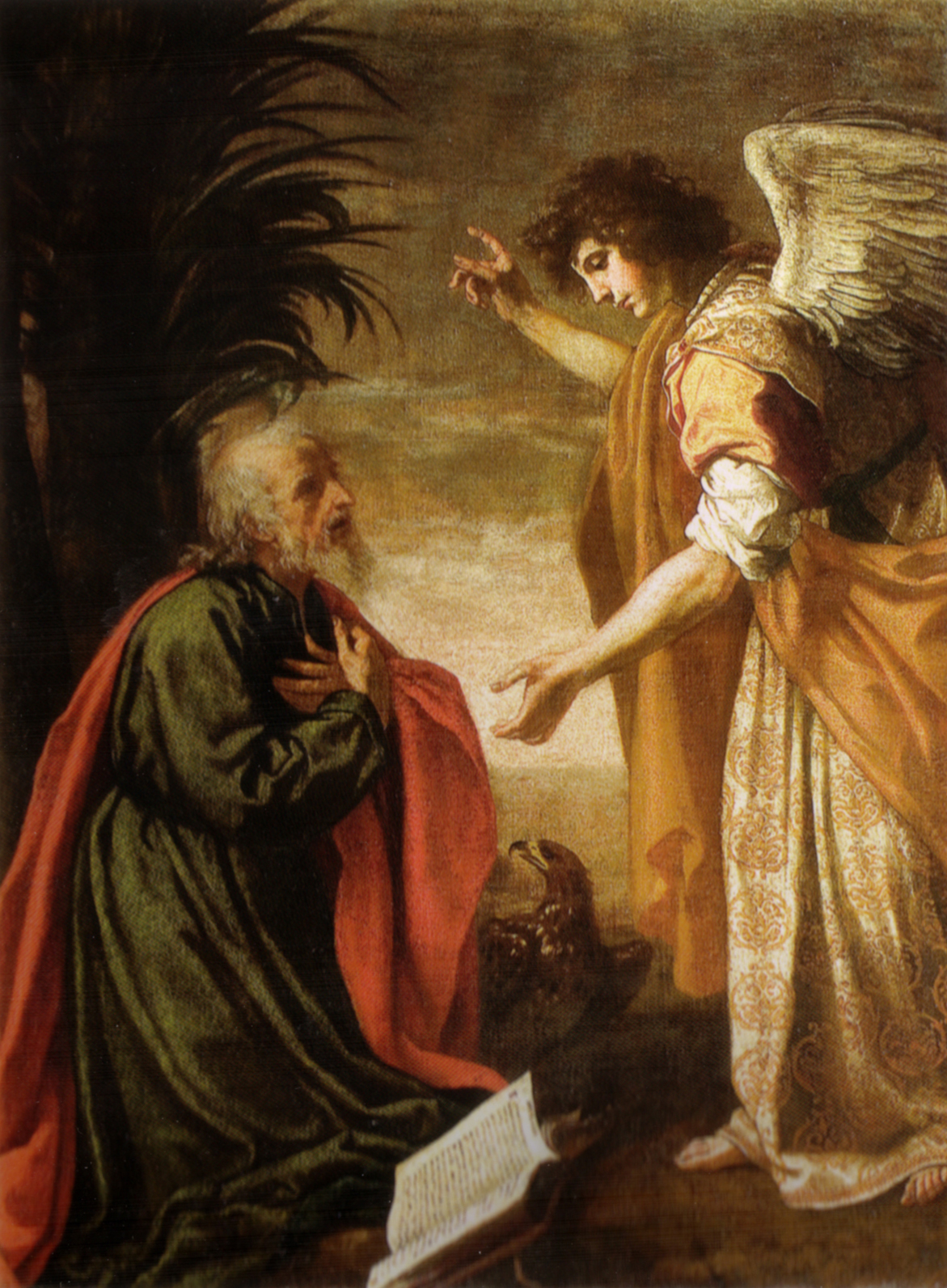
John the Apostle on Patmos, a 17th-century painting by Jacopo Vignali

=== History from the Classical period to the present ===
Patmos is seldom mentioned by ancient writers. Therefore, very little is known about the earliest inhabitants. In the Classical period, the Patmians prefer to identify themselves as Dorians descending from the families of Argos, Sparta and Epidaurus, further mingling with people of Ionian ancestry.

During the 3rd century BC, in the Hellenistic period, the settlement of Patmos acquired the form of an acropolis with an improved defence through a fortification wall and towers.

Patmos is mentioned in the Book of Revelation, the last book of the Christian Bible. The book's introduction states that its author, John, was on Patmos when he was given (and recorded) a vision from Jesus. Early Christian tradition identified this writer John of Patmos as John the Apostle. For this reason, Patmos is a destination for Christian pilgrimage. Visitors can see the cave where John is said to have received his Revelation (the Cave of the Apocalypse), and several monasteries on the island are dedicated to Saint John.

After the death of John of Patmos, possibly around 100 AD, a number of Early Christian basilicas were erected on Patmos. Among these was a Grand Royal Basilica in honour of Saint John, built c. 300–350 AD at the location where the Monastery of Saint John the Theologian stands today.

Early Christian life on Patmos, however, barely survived Muslim raids from the 7th to the 9th century. During this period, the Grand Basilica was destroyed. In 1088, the Byzantine Emperor Alexios I Komnenos gave Christodoulos Latrinos the complete authority over the island of Patmos, as well as the permission to build a monastery on the island. The construction of the monastery started in 1101.

Population was expanded by infusions of Byzantine immigrants fleeing the Fall of Constantinople in 1453, and Cretan immigrants fleeing the fall of Candia in 1669.

The island was controlled by the Ottoman Empire for many years, but it enjoyed certain privileges, mostly related to tax-free trade by the monastery as certified by Ottoman imperial documents held in the Library. Ottoman rule in Patmos ("Batnaz" in Ottoman Turkish) was initially interrupted by Venetian occupation during the Candian War between 1659 and 1669, then by Russian occupation during the Orlov Revolt between 1770 and 1774, and finally during the Greek War of Independence.

In 1912, in connection with the Italo-Turkish War, the Italians occupied all the islands of the Dodecanese (except Kastellorizo), including Patmos. The Italians remained there until 1943, when Nazi Germany took over the island.

In 1945, the Germans left and the island of Patmos remained autonomous until 1948, when, together with the rest of the Dodecanese Islands, it joined the independent Greece.

=== 21st century ===
In September 2008, the municipality of Patmos refused landing to a group of undocumented refugees from Afghanistan and Iraq when they were taken there for processing and care after a sea rescue. The administration refused them permission to land. Eventually they were sent to the island of Leros where they were processed and given humanitarian aid.

Forbes magazine, in 2009, named Patmos "Europe's most idyllic place to live", writing that "Patmos has evolved over the centuries but has not lost its air of quiet tranquility, which is one reason why people that know it return again and again".

== Geography ==
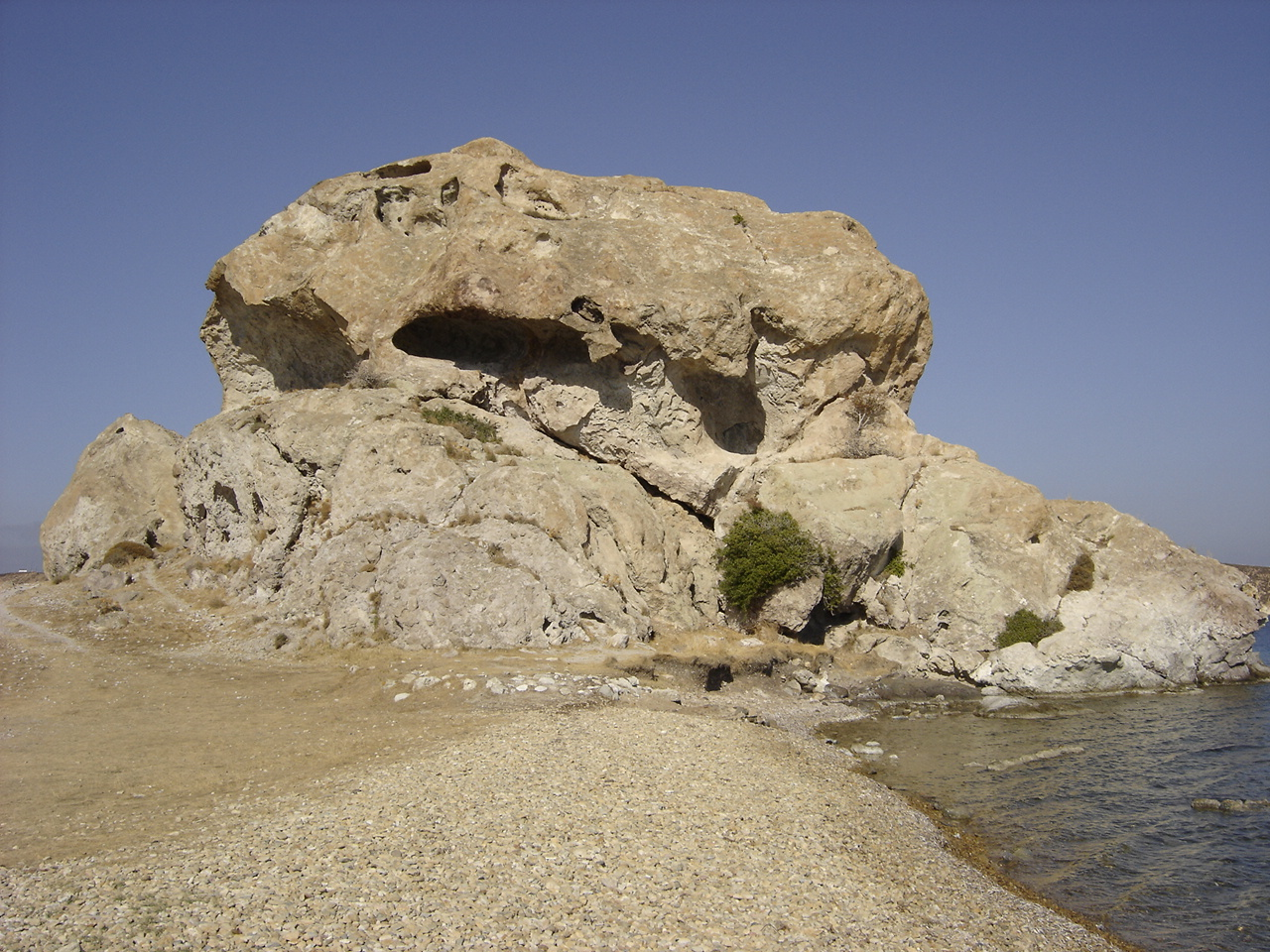
Kalikatsou Rock, Petra Beach

Patmos is situated off the west coast of Turkey and the continent of Asia. It is one of the northernmost islands of the Dodecanese complex. It is further west than its nearby neighboring islands.

It has an area of 34.05 km^{2} (13.15 sq mi). The highest point is Profitis Ilias, 269 metres (883 feet) above sea level.

Patmos' main communities are Chora (the capital city) and Skala, the only commercial port. Other settlements are Grikou and Kampos.

== Economy ==
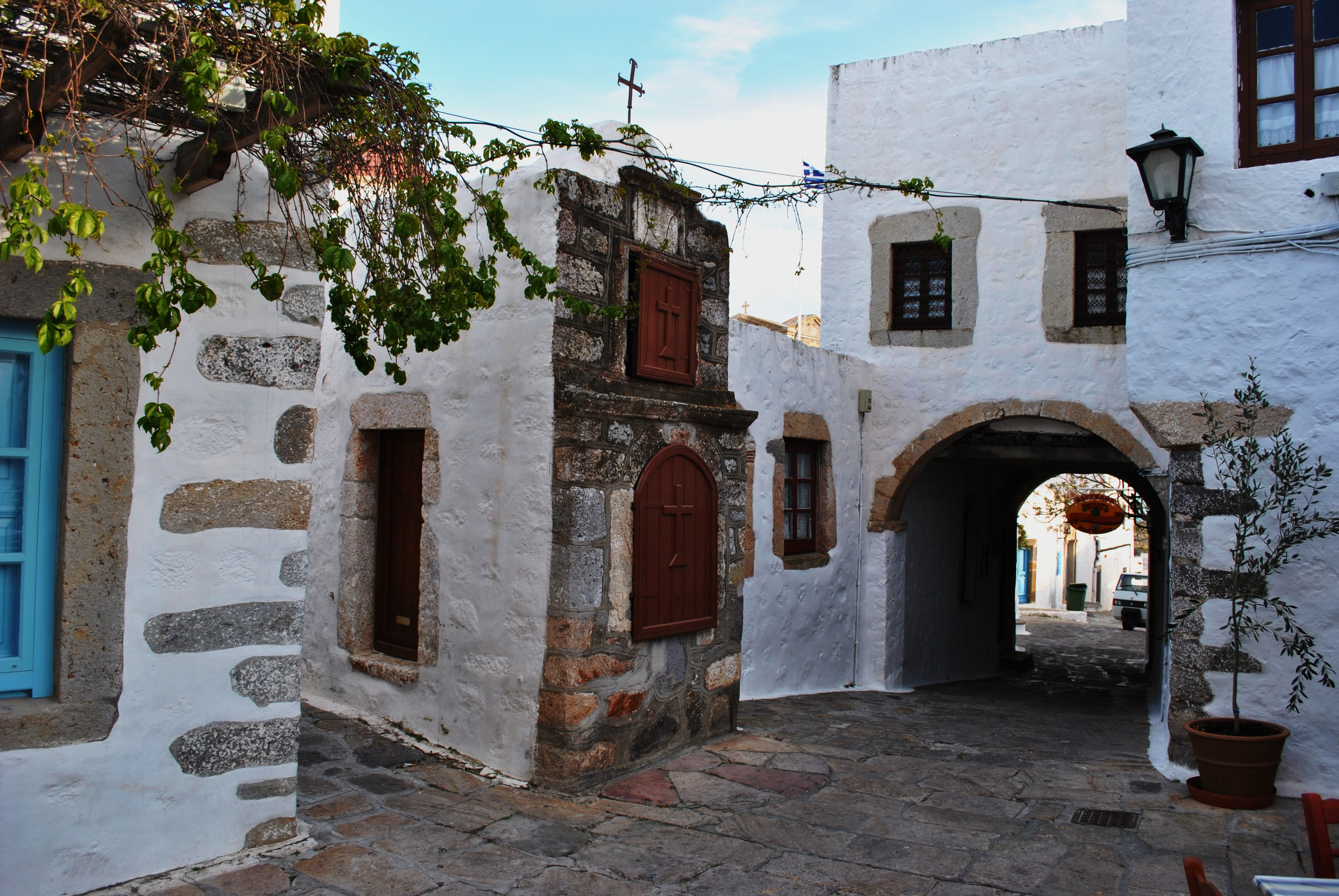
Street of Chora

=== Tourism ===
Patmos's economy is largely reliant on tourism during the summer months with Christian pilgrims frequently visiting due to the island's connection with the apostle John and the writing of the Book of Revelation.

The Monastery of Saint John and the Cave of the Apocalypse are among the sites most often visited by pilgrims. However, the beaches and quiet natural beauty have also led to an increase in tourists.

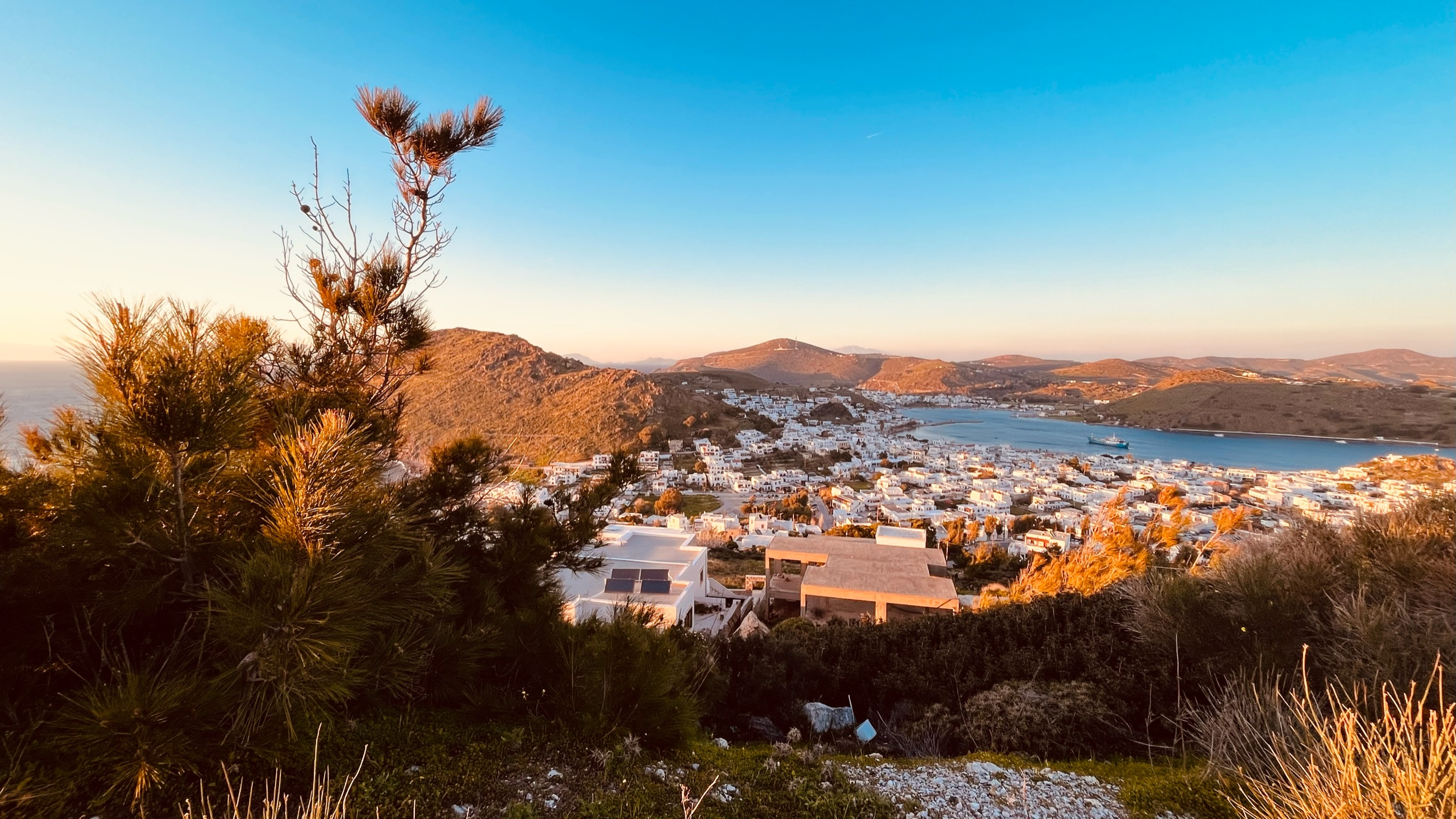
View from the Monastery of Saint John the Theologian

== Health ==
For emergencies, Patmos has a medical centre, with several medical doctors on the premises. When residents require hospitalization beyond first aid, they are airlifted out of the island by helicopter (in emergencies) to nearby hospitals or, if the weather permits, they are transported by ferry.

== Infrastructure ==
=== Ferry ===
The Island of Patmos has regular ferry services, which connect it to the following ports: Agathonissi Island, Mykonos Island, Paros Island, Piraeus (the main port of Athens), Pythagoreio and Karlovassi on Samos Island, Syros Island, Leros Island, Naxos Island, Arkoi, Lipsi Island, Symi Island and Rhodes Island.

== Notable people ==
- John of Patmos, author of the Book of Revelation
- Patriarch Jeremias III of Constantinople
- Patriarch Neophytus VI of Constantinople
- Patriarch Jacob of Alexandria
- Emmanuil Xanthos, founder of Filiki Eteria
- Teddy Millington-Drake, English artist
- Robert Lax, American poet
- Emmanuel Carrère, French novelist
- Laurence de Cambronne, French journalist
- Amphilochios (Makris) of Patmos, A 20th-century saint of the Eastern Orthodox Church

== International relations ==
=== Twin towns — Sister cities ===
Patmos is twinned with:

- Auderghem, Belgium
- Grottaferrata, Italy
- Glastonbury, United Kingdom

== See also ==
- Icaria – island to the northwest
- Patmos, Arkansas
